= Haitians in France =

Haitians in France and the French of Haitian descent Haïtiens en France et les Français d'origine Haïtienne
Total population
- Residents of France born in Haiti 62,448.

Regions with significant populations
- Paris

Languages
- French, Haitian Creole

Religion
- Roman Catholicism, Haitian Vodou

Related ethnic groups
- Blacks in France, French Haitian

Haitians in France consist of migrants from Haiti and their descendants living in France.

== Demographics ==
The 2017 Census recorded 62,448 Haitian-born people.

Year	Haitian-born population	Other data	Immigrants
1999		12,163	
2004	49,973		
2006		1,844	
2011	52,000		
2016	60 900		
2017	62 448		

== List of notable Haitians in France ==
=== Artists ===
- Edgar Degas, artist
- Edouard Duval-Carrié, painter and sculptor
- Philippe Dodard, graphic artist and painter
- Gérard Fombrun, sculptor

=== Athletes ===
- Ronald Agénor, professional tennis player
- Bryan Alceus, professional football player
- Gary Ambroise, professional football player
- Ernst Atis-Clotaire, professional football player
- Jean-Kévin Augustin, professional football player
- Hervé Bazile, professional football player
- Kervens Belfort, professional football player
- Jean-Ricner Bellegarde, professional football player
- Frantz Bertin, professional football player
- Davidson Charles, professional football player
- Rochel Chery, professional basketball player
- Yves Desmarets, professional football player
- Belony Dumas, professional football player
- Jean-Kévin Duverne, professional football player
- Wagneau Eloi, professional football player
- Gabriel Flambert, professional football player
- Herby Fortunat, professional football player
- Yassin Fortune, professional football player
- Romain Genevois, professional football player
- Marc Hérold Gracien, professional football player; was considered as the fastest player in France by beating Nicolas Anelka's record after a physical test at Clarefontaine (The National Institute of Soccer)
- Constantin Henriquez, first person of color to compete in the Olympic Games and by extension to win a gold medal; rugby union footballer
- Max Hilaire, professional football player
- Lecsinel Jean-François, professional football player
- Dominique Jean-Zéphirin, professional football player
- Jean-Dimmy Jéoboam, professional basketball player
- Georgi Joseph, professional basketball player
- Steeven Joseph-Monrose, professional football player
- Presnel Kimpembe, professional football player
- Kevin Lafrance, professional football player
- Alexandre Lippmann, fencer
- Jeff Louis, professional football player
- Mike Maignan, professional football player
- Jean-Eudes Maurice, professional football player
- Pierre Mercier, professional football player
- Rénald Metelus, professional football player
- Soni Mustivar, professional football player
- Wilner Nazaire, professional football player
- Alexis Nicolas, professional kickboxer
- Ralph Noncent, professional football player
- Windsor Noncent, professional football player
- Vladimir Pascal, professional football player
- Jean-Jacques Pierre, professional football player
- Listner Pierre-Louis, professional football player
- Johny Placide, professional football player
- Yves Pons, professional basketball player
- Dylan Saint-Louis, professional football player
- Abel Thermeus, professional football player
- William Vainqueur, professional football player
- Ronaël Pierre-Gabriel

=== Entertainment ===
- Jeanne Duval, actress
- Raoul Peck, filmmaker

=== Historical personalities ===
- Eugene Bullard, first African-American military pilot, whose ancestors where Haitian slaves who fled the Haitian Revolution.
- Charles Terres Weymann, racing pilot, who flew for Nieuport during World War I as a test pilot and was awarded the rank of Chevalier of the Legion of Honour.
- Jean-Baptiste Belley, former slave from Saint Domingue
- Joseph Philippe Lemercier Laroche, engineer and the only passenger of known African ancestry on the ill-fated voyage of the RMS Titanic.
- Michèle Bennett, ex-wife of former President for Life of Haiti, Jean-Claude Duvalier.
- Serge Gilles, exiled leader of the Fusion of Haitian Social Democrats political party of Haiti.

=== Literature ===
- Alexandre Dumas, writer (most notable for works such as The Three Musketeers)
- Alexandre Dumas, fils, writer and dramatist
- Félix Morisseau-Leroy, writer
- Gary Klang, poet and novelist
- Ida Faubert, writer
- Jacques Bins, comte de Saint-Victor, poet
- Jacques Roumain, writer, politician, and advocate of Marxism
- Jean-Baptiste Dureau de la Malle, writer and translator
- Jean-Baptiste Romane, poet and one poem, Vers à la France, he was awarded a gold medallion by the French government
- Jean Dominique, journalist
- Joel Dreyfuss, journalist, editor, and writer
- John James Audubon, ornithologist, naturalist, and painter
- Maggy de Coster, writer
- Paul Arcelin, writer
- Pierre Faubert, poet and playwright
- René Depestre, poet and former communist activist
- Roger Gaillard, historian and novelist
- Solon Ménos, author and politician
- Thomas Madiou, historian
- Victor Séjour, author

=== Medicine ===
- François Fournier de Pescay, first person of color to have practiced medicine and surgery in Europe.

=== Models ===
- Misty Jean, former Miss West Indies and singer

=== Music ===
- Célimène Daudet, pianist
- Alibi Montana, rapper
- Kery James, rapper and singer
- Michel Paul Guy de Chabanon, violinist, composer and writer
- Roi Heenok, rapper, producer and entrepreneur

=== Political figures ===
- Alexandre Pétion
- André Rigaud
- Dumarsais Estimé
- Franck Lavaud, military general and politician
- François-Ferdinand Christophe
- Jean-Baptiste Mills
- Jean-Claude Bajeux, political activist and professor of Caribbean literature
- Joseph Bunel
- Jules DeMun
- Léon Thébaud, lawyer and ambassador
- Lysius Salomon
- Michaëlle Jean
- Paul Arcelin, political activist
- Paul Lafargue, revolutionary Marxist socialist
- Philippe Kieffer, French officer and political personality, and a hero of the Free French Forces
- Thomas-Alexandre Dumas
- Toussaint Louverture

== See also ==
- French Haitians
- France–Haiti relations
- Haitian Canadians
- Haitian diaspora
- List of Haitians
- List of Haitian Americans
