= Liberal Party (Haiti) =

Political party in Haiti

Liberal Party Parti Liberal
- Haitian Creyole name: Pati Liberal
- Abbreviation: PL
- Founder: Jean-Pierre Boyer Bazelais; Edmond Paul
- Founded: February 19, 1870
- Ideology: Economic liberalism Technocracy; Multiracialism; Conservatism; Industrialisation; Isolationism; Protectionism; Civic nationalism Elitism
- Political position: Centre-right
- Slogan: "Government by the Most Competent"
- Main Opponent: National Party

The Liberal Party, (Parti Liberal; PL) founded on February 19, 1870, by Jean-Pierre Boyer Bazelais and Edmond Paul, was an economically liberal political party in Haiti that advocated for technocratic leadership, well embodied in its motto "Government by the Most Competent". Central to the party's ideology was the bourgeois belief that the small elite of Haiti were best suited to chart its future. Their main rival was the National Party. Both of these parties are considered as the nation's first modern and nationwide political parties.

The Liberals were a dominant force in the early 1870s, initially controlling the majority of seats in Haiti’s parliament under the presidency of Jean-Nicholas Nissage Saget. They were then sidelined during the succeeding presidency of Michel Domingue, with many prominent Liberals fleeing Haiti to Jamaica and beyond. In 1876, the Liberals mounted a successful invasion of Haiti to reclaim control, overthrowing President Domingue and installing Pierre Théoma Boisrond-Canal as head of a provisional government, who would later assume full presidential authority.

Throughout the late 1870s and into the 1880s, the Liberal Party splintered into rival factions, driven more by personal rivalries rather than ideological differences. One faction was led by Boisrond-Canal (Canalistes), while the other by one of the party's founders, Boyer-Bazelais (Bazelaisistes). Despite this fragmentation, the Liberals continued to resist National Party rule under Lysius Salomon, culminating into the Liberal Insurrection of 1883, during which Boyer-Bazelais was killed. From the presidency of Florvil Hyppolite onwards (1889–1896), the lines between the Liberals and Nationals became increasingly blurry and ultimately irrelevant.

Ultimately, there is no consensus among Haitian writers on whether or not the Liberal Party and the National Party truly survived the deaths of their respective leaders – Boyer-Bazelais in 1883 and Salomon in 1888. (Note: The exact date of the Liberal Party's dissolution remains unclear.)

== Ideology ==
The Liberals, also known as Constitutionalists, promoted economic liberalism and financial reform. They were staunch critics of military despotism, championing a civilian-led government, advocating for the reduction of military power and the establishment of a strong National Assembly to supersede executive authority.

Their motto, "Government by the Most Competent", best encapsulated their outlook, believing that the skilled and educated elite should govern the nation. Although this elitist and bourgeois viewpoint had always been present in Haitian society, the Liberal Party was the first to formally organize these beliefs. While their platform appealed to urban merchants, traders, and the affluent elite, it alienated those who desired popular representation and political inclusivity.

Rejecting divisive color-based politics, the Liberals aspired to a nationalism that transcended Haiti's racial divides. This was in stark contrast to their rivals, the National Party, which leveraged color politics to gain popular support from the majority Black Haitian population; their motto was "The greatest power for the greatest number." (Note: The exact phrasing of the motto varies. Other sources state it as "The greatest good for the greatest number.")

Although the Liberals were widely seen as representing the interests of the light-skinned Mulatto elite, prominent members such as Anténor Firmin and Edmond Paul were black. Firmin's critics snidely remarked that he was "a mulatto as light as a white."

== Background ==
Jean-Pierre Boyer's long regime saw color divisions intensify as the concentration of power and privileges among the Mulattos under him fostered resentment within Black Haitians, culminating into backlash which resulted in the rise of Faustin Soulouque, a Black military leader who declared himself emperor in 1849 and used his reign to consolidate power in favor of the Black majority. However, Soulouque's imperial ambitions collapsed in 1859, leading to his abdication, the reestablishment of a republican government under Fabre Geffrard, and the return of the Mulatto elite to political power. Whatever goodwill he gained through restoring the republic gradually dissipated in the repression of opposition that his regime later carried on.

In 1867, Fabre Geffrard's government was overthrown by Sylvian Salnave, a charismatic and initially popular figure. However, his reign soon emulated the autocratic tendecies of his predecessors, dissolving the National Assembly and nullifying the constitution. These dictatorial actions of his provoked widespread dissent across the nation. General Jean-Nicolas Nissage Saget led an insurgency in the north, while others too capitalized on the chaos; General Normil Dubois formed the Constitutional Army of the South and Michel Domingue became president of the Meridional State of the South around Les Cayes.

By 1868, Haiti had splintered into three: Salnave's government, Saget's northern republic, and the southern forces.

By 1869, with opposition forces moving in on the capital of Port-au-Prince, the defeat of Salnave was all but certain. In spectacular fashion, Salnave blew up the presidential palace as he fled the capital to the Dominican Republic. However, he was captured by Dominican frontier guards loyal to General José María Cabral, a supporter of Saget. On December 19, Salnave was turned over to Haitian authorities. He was tried on charges of incendiarism and murder and was executed on January 15, 1870.

The destruction of the presidential palace symbolized the end of conflict over the form of government (republic vs monarchy/empire). Out of the 1868–1869 crisis emerged a new political paradigm, one characterized by factional divides within a republican framework. By 1869, the ideological debate was no longer about what type of government Haiti should adopt but instead about how the republic should be governed. This era of party-based politics was marked by the polarization between the Black and Mulatto elites manifesting into two political parties: the predominantly Mulatto "Liberal Party" and the preponderantly Black "National Party". The both of them are considered as Haiti's first modern and nationwide political parties.

Michel-Roplh Troulliot argues that during this period, "Haiti came as close as it ever has to an effective parliamentary experience". Though it should not be mistaken that this was a period of calm. Civil wars and insurrections still persisted throughout this era.

== History ==
=== 1870–1874 ===
The Liberal Party was established on February 19, 1870, by Jean-Pierre Boyer Bazelais and Edmond Paul following the civil war in the 1860s. The party dominated politics in the early 1870s, controlling the majority of the seats in Haiti's parliament and implementing a reformist agenda under president Nissage Saget.

By 1873, President Saget was nearing the end of his term, and Michel Domingue, known for his brutal record during the civil war in the 1860s, emerged as his leading successor. Many within the Liberal Party viewed a potential Domingue presidency as a dangerous step towards despotism, and thus rallied behind Sénèque Momplaisir Pierre as a counter-candidate.

In the January 1873 legislative elections, Domingue's supporters in the National Party failed to secure a majority in the House of Deputies. The Liberals capitalized on this by electing Boyer-Bazelais as the president of the House with a decisive majority. This outraged the National Party and their leader, Septimus Rameau, leading them to withdraw from the house, creating a constitutional crisis by paralyzing legislative proceedings.

Despite the deadlock, the remaining members of the House elected Georges Brice, a Liberal, as the new president of the House. President Saget however refused to recognize the election, citing a constitutional requirement that two-thirds of the entire membership be present for such decisions to be considered valid.

By May 1874, the Liberals proposed extending President Saget's term beyond its expiration. Nevertheless, President Saget chose to step down as planned, handing over power to the Council of Secretaries of State. He was the first president to complete his term in office and not press for an extension.

The Council of Secretaries of State appointed Michel Domingue as the commander-in-chief of the Haitian army. Domingue and his advisers bypassed the established constitutional processes by calling for a constituent assembly on June 10 that would supersede the National Assembly and essentially rubber-stamp his presidency. Under coercion, the constituent assembly unanimously voted to name Domingue as president of the republic.

Although Domingue was president, real power laid with his nephew, Septimus Rameau, who served as vice president of the Council of Secretaries of State. The new government, as feared, pushed through constitutional changes to double the presidential term from four years to eight years and granted the president the right to dissolve both chambers of the National Assembly.

With the increasingly despotic rule of President Domingue, many Liberals chose to flee Haiti, seeking refuge in Kingston (Jamaica) and St. Thomas (then part of the Danish West Indies).

=== 1875–1879 ===
During Agriculture Day festivities in 1875, Domingue's forces seized on the opportunity to eliminate the remaining leadership of the Liberal Party still in Haiti – Monplaisir Pierre, Georges Brice, and Boisrond Canal. Georges Brice was murdered in a surprise attack while Boisrond-Canal managed to escape with his family to Kingston.

In 1876, exiled Liberals in Jamaica and St. Thomas organized an invasion of Jacmel that killed many, including the founder of the National Party, Rameau. The Liberal Party successfully overthrew President Domingue and installed Pierre Théoma Boisrond-Canal as president of a provisional government.

Throughout the remainder of the 1870s, the Liberal Party became increasingly divided, splitting into two factions driven more by personal rivalries rather than ideological difference. One faction was led by Boisrond-Canal (Canalistes), while the other by one of the party's founders, Boyer-Bazelais (Bazelaisistes). President Canal, a Liberal early on, began supporting the National Party, effectively betraying his own party. During legislative elections, President Canal attempted to prevent a potential Bazelais presidency by instructing the military to back National candidates. Hannibal Price, a Liberal deputy, wrote "Canal preferred to betray the party who had been his friends sooner than to see his rival succeed to the Presidency."

This power struggle culminated into violence as rival politicians clashed in the streets of Port-au-Prince. Government forces, deeply divided, turned against one another; the National Guard, supportive of the Liberals, fought against the army, which was still loyal to the government. Government troops deployed a cannon and attacked Boyer-Bazelais' house. Civil disorder in Port-au-Prince inspired uprisings across the north, northwest, and Artibonite regions. By late July 1879, President Canal was overthrown and Bazelais was ultimately forced into exile in Jamaica. A provisional government, led by General Joseph Lamothe, was formed to maintain order. Lamothe's government was hostile to the Liberal Party, barring its leaders from elections. Heriston Hérissé was the most prominent candidate within the provisional regime. In response, the Nationals of Lysius Salomon decided to topple the Lamothe-Hérissé regime, culminating in General Richelieu Duperval's coup on October 3, which installed a new provisional government.

On October 23, the National Assembly unanimously elected General Louis Étienne Félicité Lysius Salomon, the National candidate, president for a seven-year term.

=== 1879–1888 ===
Under President Salomon, the Nationals were in power for nearly a decade, from 1879 to 1888. Though their rule was marred by violent attempts to unseat them, the most notable being the failed 1883 Liberal uprising which began in Miragoâne and was led by Boyer Bazelais. The uprising came about following the passage of Salomon's controversial 1883 land reform law.

Over a hundred Liberal partisans, led by Boyer-Bazelais, captured Miragoâne, a port town and Liberal stronghold. The victory emboldened the insurgents, who spread their movement throughout the southern peninsula, including in Jérémie and Jacmel. By September, the insurrection had reached the nation's capital. The insurgents however failed to gain ground in Port-au-Prince. Under pressure from foreign powers concerned of the uprising threatening their business interests, President Salomon quickly reestablished order in the capital. Thereafter, the movement lost momentum and its leader, Boyer-Bazelais, died in Miragoâne in October 1883.

=== 1888–1896 ===
President Salomon's term was set to end on May 15, 1887. To keep him in power, the National Assembly amended the constitution, which had previously barred him from serving another term. On June 30, 1886, President Salomon was reelected once more for a seven-year term. Significant discontent proceeded this act of politicking, with many believing this was a step towards a presidency-for-life.

On August 4, 1888, General Seide Thélémanque, who commanded the northern provinces near Cap-Haïtien, publicly declared that he would no longer recognize Salomon’s authority and formed the separatist République Septentrionale. Under pressure, Salomon resigned, leading to the formation of a provisional government led by former president Boisrond-Canal to maintain order.

On September 17, constituents were elected to decide Haiti's new president. Nearly a month later on October 14, they selected François Légitime as the new president of Haiti. Following General Thélémaque's untimely death, Florvil Hyppolite succeeded him as the new leader of the separatist government in Cap-Haïtien.

By 1889, Florvil Hyppolite led a successful uprising against Légitime and managed to reunify Haiti ushering in an era of relative peace. Though Hyppolite fought with the backing of the Nationals, he declared himself a Liberal by the time he assumed the presidency, making the divisions increasingly blurry. Hyppolite declared a policy of impartial governance, pledging to avoid favoritism and ensure no group received undue advantage. Despite this, President Hyppolite exiled many National opposition figures while reintegrating prominent Liberal leaders (Edmond Paul and Anténor Firmin) into government roles.

There is considerable disagreement among Haitian writers on whether or not the Liberal Party and the National Party truly survived the deaths of their respective leaders – Boyer-Bazelais in 1883 and Salomon in 1888.

=== 1900s ===
By the 20th-century, new political forces emerged, including the Firminism movement, named after Anténor Firmin. This movement emerged during the political vacuum following the resignation of President Tirésias Simon Sam, the successor to President Hyppolite. As the elections to elect a new president approached, Firmin and General Pierre Nord Alexis emerged as the primary contenders. Those supporting Firmin were called the "Firministes" while those who supported Alexis were called the "Nordistes".

Advocating for economic reform, the reduction of military influence in politics, the broader inclusion of civilian participation in governance, and a third-way that transcended the traditional Liberal and National divide, Firminism quickly gained momentum.

Between June and December 1902, Haiti was engulfed in civil war between these two factions. However, Firmin’s movement lacked the necessary military strength to succeed and it was ultimately crushed. Firmin was forced into exile once more and General Alexis was declared president of Haiti on December 17, 1902. Subsequent Firminist uprisings in 1908 also ended in defeat, and the long-awaited Firminist revolution never materialized.

== Bibliography ==
- Stieber, Chelsea (2020). Haiti's Paper War: Post-Independence Writing, Civil War, and the Making of the Republic, 1804–1954. NYU Press. pp. 201–227. ISBN 978-1479802135.
- Byrd, Brandon; Stieber, Chelsea. Haiti for the Haitians: by Louis-Joseph Janvier.
- Zacaïr, Philippe. "Haiti On His Mind: Antonio Maceo And Caribbeanness". Caribbean Studies.
- Smith, Matthew (2014). Liberty, Fraternity, Exile: Haiti and Jamaica after Emancipation. UNC Press Books. ISBN 978-1469617985.
- Windsor Bellegarde; Justin Lherisson (1906). Manuel d'Histoire D'Haiti: Conforme Aux Programmes Officiels a l'Usage des Ecoles de la Republique. OCLC 2183938.
- Bethell, Leslie. The Cambridge History of Latin America. Cambridge University Press. pp. 311–312.
- Logan, Rayford. Haiti and the Dominican Republic. p. 109.
- Nicholls, David (1979). From Dessalines to Duvalier: Race, Colour and National Independence in Haiti. pp. 106–141.
- Dayan, Joan. "A Few Stories about Haiti, or, Stigma Revisited". Research in African Literatures: 169. JSTOR 3821351.
