= France–Haiti relations =

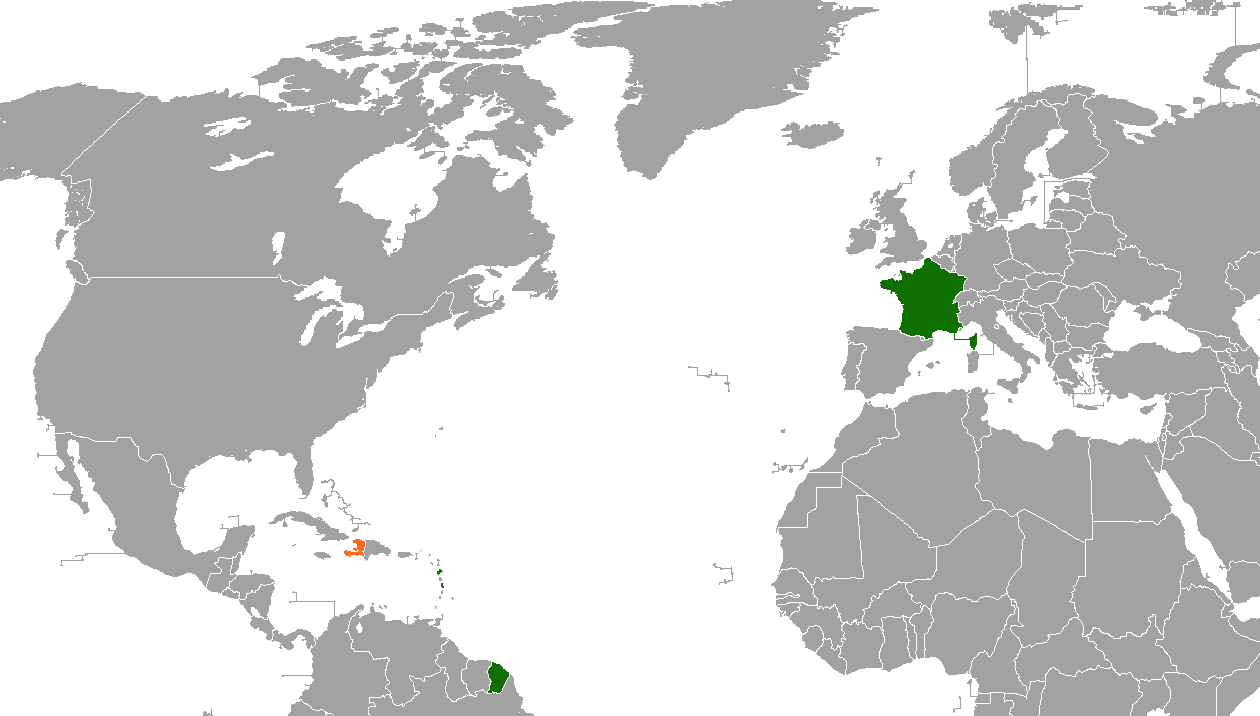

- France: Haiti

Diplomatic mission
- Embassy of France in Haiti: Embassy of the Republic of Haiti in France

Envoy
- Ambassador Antoine Michon: Ambassador Louino Volcy

France–Haiti relations (French: Relations Entre la République Française et la République d'Haïti; Haitian Creole: Relasyon Repiblik Fransèz-Repiblik d Ayiti) are foreign relations between France and Haiti. Both nations are members of the Organisation internationale de la Francophonie, United Nations, and the World Trade Organization.

== History ==
The first French to arrive to Haiti were pirates who began to use the island of Tortuga (northern Haiti) in 1625 as a base and settlement for raids against Spanish ships. In 1663, French settlers founded a colony in Léogâne, on the western portion of Hispaniola. After the Nine Years' War in 1697, the Spanish Empire ceded the western portion of Hispaniola with the signing of the Treaty of Ryswick that same year. France named the colony Saint-Domingue. The colony was France's most productive and richest colony, and was made to grow primarily tobacco, indigo, sugar, cotton, and cacao. France used the labor of slaves from Africa, as a result of the near extinction of the Taíno people.

=== Independence ===
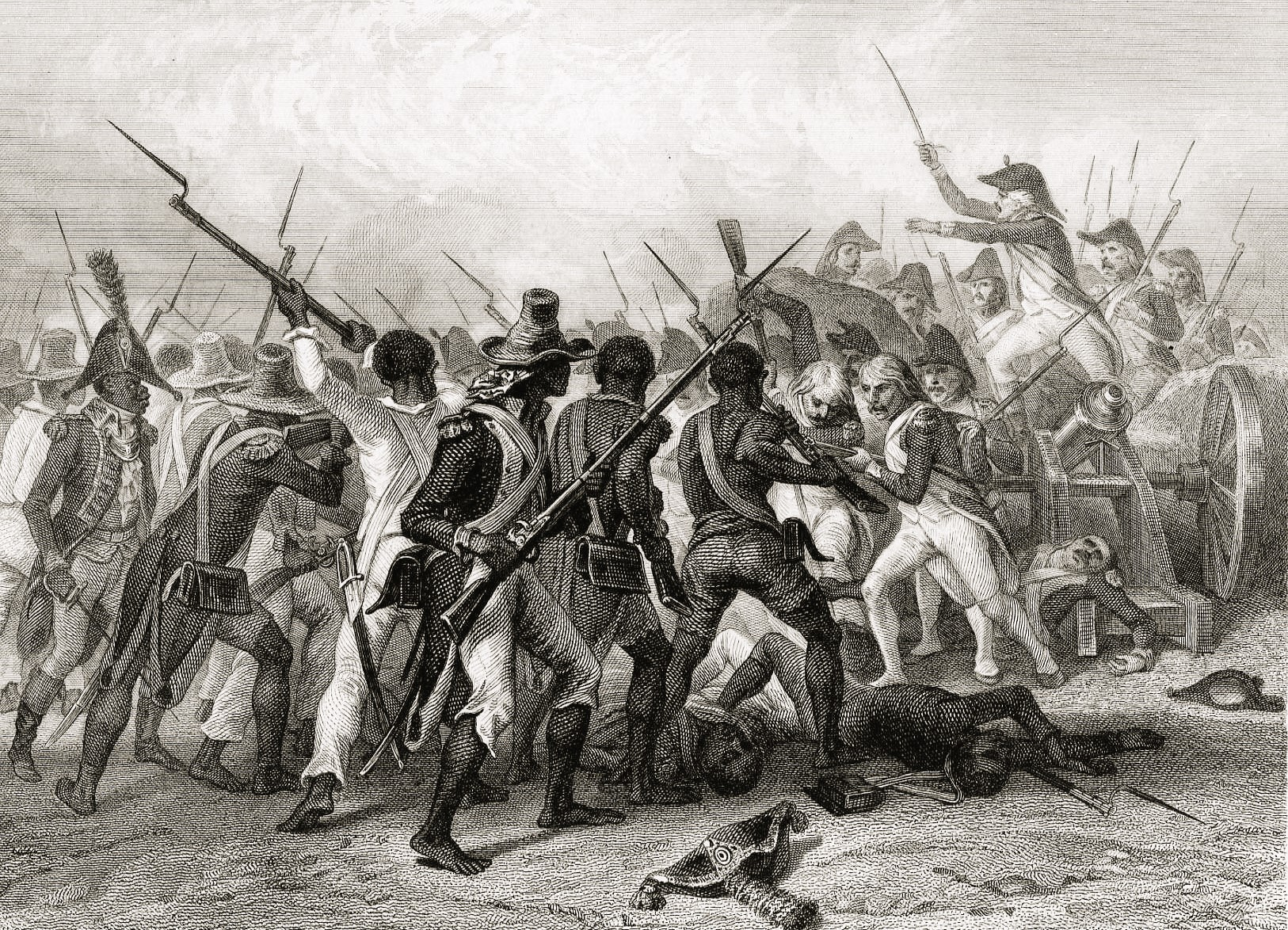
1839 illustration of the 1802 Battle of Crête-à-Pierrot

From 1789 to 1799, France underwent a revolution. The revolution in France had great implications in Haiti. In August 1791, slaves in the northern region of Haiti staged a revolt which would be known as the Haitian Revolution. In 1793, France sent as an envoy Léger-Félicité Sonthonax to maintain control and stabilize the colony from the revolution. In February 1793, Haitian leader Toussaint Louverture joined Spanish forces in fighting the French. In October 1793, Sonthonax emancipated the slaves in all of Haiti. In May 1794, Louverture left the Spanish army after they refused to free their slaves in the eastern part of Hispaniola.

In 1801, Louverture defeated the Spanish in Santo Domingo and emancipated the slaves of the territory. In 1802, General Napoleon Bonaparte sent 40,000 French and Polish troops to Hispaniola. Soon afterwards, Napoleon's brother-in-law General Charles Leclerc asked to meet Louverture to discuss terms. It was a deception and Louverture was seized and deported to France where he died in April 1803. After the death of Louverture, Jean-Jacques Dessalines stood as leader of the independence struggle and continued battling French forces. After the Battle of Vertières in November 1803, France abandoned all hope of retaining control over the colony. On 1 January 1804, Dessalines declared independence for Saint-Domingue and renamed the new nation 'Haiti'.

=== Post-independence ===
Despite the loss to the revolutionaries, interest in regaining Haiti did not dissipate immediately, even after the Bourbon Restoration overthrew Napoleon. The Bourbon dynasty retained the restoration of slavery in French colonies. In 1814 King Louis XVIII, who had helped overthrow Napoléon earlier that year, sent three commissioners to Haiti to assess the willingness of the country’s rulers to surrender. The offer was rejected outright by Henri Christophe, who ruled northern Haiti and remained suspicious to France's restoration of slavery. Alexandre Pétion, who ruled southern Haiti, sought to negotiate payment of an indemnity akin to the 1803 Louisiana Purchase (even proposing the same payment of US$15 million) in return for diplomatic recognition. The French government rejected the offer, with Louis XVIII disparaging the offer as negotiation with "runaway slaves".

France officially acknowledged Haitian independence in 1824.

In 1825, French King Charles X demanded Haiti reimburse and compensate France for the loss of money and trade from Haiti's independence. France threatened to invade Haiti and sent 12 war ships to the island nation. On 17 April 1825 an agreement was made between the two nations. France renounced all attempts to re-conquer Haiti and recognized Haiti as an independent nation after Haiti agreed to pay France 150 million gold francs in indemnity to the former colonists within five years. In November 1825, the first French consul presented his credentials to President Jean-Pierre Boyer. On 12 February 1838, a 'Treaty of Peace and Friendship' was signed between both nations.

Since the establishment of diplomatic relations between, both nations have signed several agreements and treaties, such as an agreement on commerce (1958); treaty on trade (1959); agreement on air transportation between both nations (1965); agreement on cultural, scientific and technical cooperation (1972); convention on the protection of investments (1973); cooperation on tourism (2007) and an agreement on joint research and of professional training (2015).

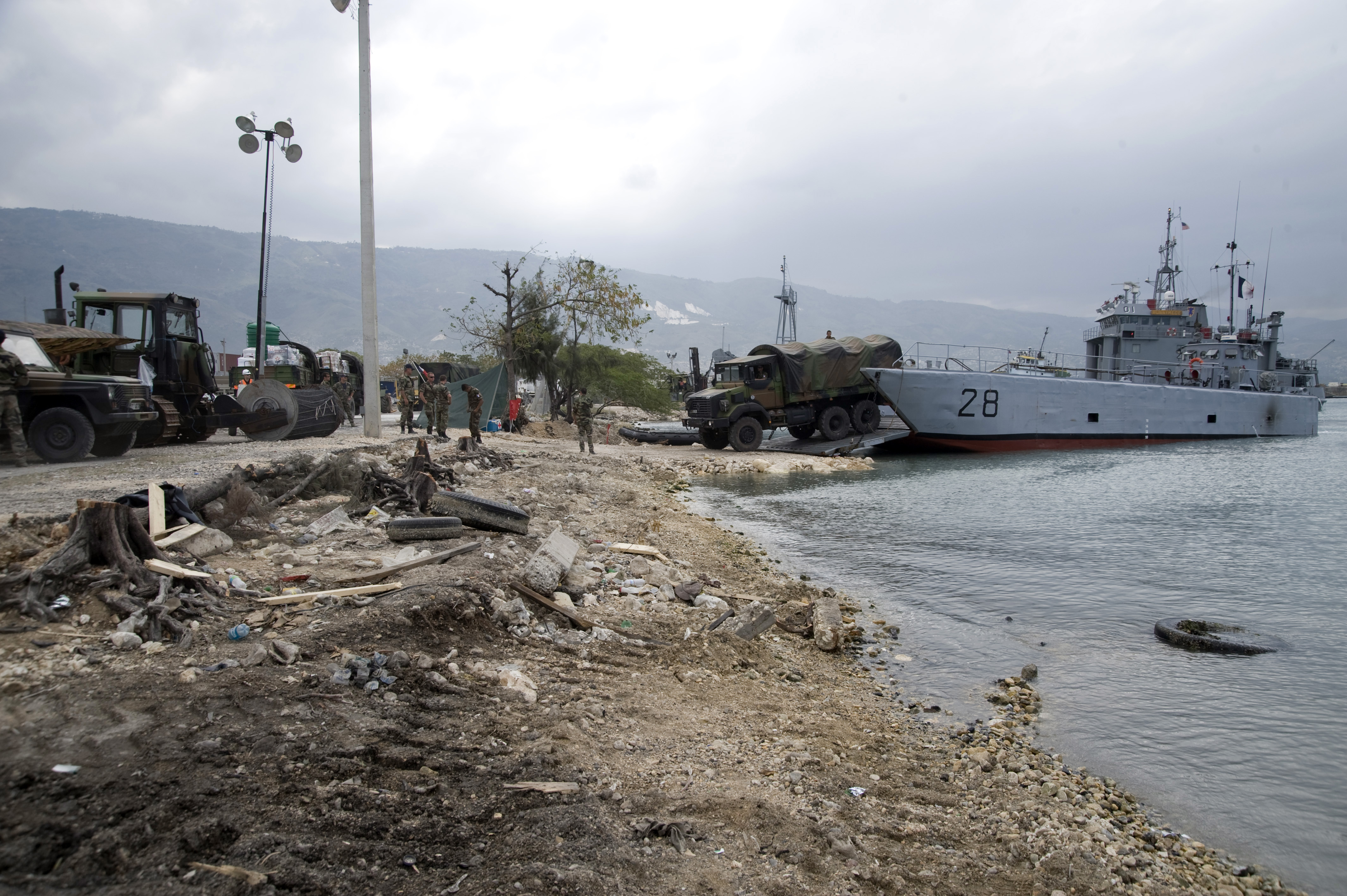
French military unloading equipment and aid onto a beach in Haiti, 2010

Since independence, France continued to play an important role in Haitian affairs. Several Haitian Presidents ousted from power sought refuge in France, such as Presidents Jean-Pierre Boyer, Lysius Salomon, Franck Lavaud and Jean-Claude Duvalier. In December 1993, France asked the United Nations to tighten sanctions on Haiti after the removal of President Jean-Bertrand Aristide from power by the military in September 1991.

In February 2010, French President Nicolas Sarkozy paid a visit to Haiti, the first by a French President. During his visit, President Sarkozy promised Haiti €230 million EUR in aid after the island nation suffered its worst earthquake in its history. President Sarkozy also announced the cancellation of €56 million EUR debt owed by Haiti to France. In May 2015, French President François Hollande paid an official visit to Haiti and promised $145 million USD in development projects within the island nation.

== Trade ==
In 2017, trade between both France and Haiti totaled €69 million EUR. France's main exports to Haiti include: manufactured products, clothing, mechanical equipment, dairy products, and medicines. Haiti's main exports to France include: fruits and vegetables, beverage plants (cocoa and coffee), distilled alcoholic beverages (rum), ready meals, and spice plants. All imports from Haiti to France are duty-free and quota-free, with the exception of armaments, as part of the Everything but Arms initiative of the European Union.

== Defense and security ==
=== Law enforcement ===
France actively supports the Haitian National Police with training, technical assistance, and equipment. Through the French Embassy, the HPN has received drones, laptops, light and armored vehicles, weapons, night vision equipment, personal protection equipment, among other things. France's elite police unit RAID trained what is now known as the Tactical Anti-Gang Unit (Unité Tactique Anti-Gang), and other units like GIPNH (Groupe d'Intervention de la Police National d'Haiti), BLTS (Brigade de Lutte contre le Trafique de Stupéfiants), BLVV (Brigade de Lutte contre le Vol de Vehicules) etc. The most recent session saw 4 RAID members deployed to Haiti to train 55 agents across multiple Haitian police units, as well as 9 instructors. Training covered tactical shooting drills and realistic simulations. 4 tons of equipment and materials were delivered as part of this session.

=== Military ===
In April 2024, on in interview on Haitian news outlet Metropole, The ambassador of France to Haiti, Fabrice Mauriès, stated that France was open to military cooperation with Haiti and that discussions were had with the Haitian government to form servicemembers in their bases in the Antilles. On 25 August, outgoing French ambassador Fabrice Mauriès stated that France has always supported the Haitian Armed Forces and confirmed that starting September 2024, members of the armed forces would start travelling to Martinique for training with the French Forces to the Antilles. On 18 September 2024, Defense Minister Berthier Antoine, newly appointed French Ambassador Antoine Michon, and Lieutenant colonel Pierre Laoufi of the French Forces in the Antilles would announce that 50 members of the FAD'H would be traveling to Martinique for continuing formation with the French Armed Forces to the Antilles (FAA), part of the operational military partnership named "SABRE Haiti".

The first contingent of 25 soldier traveled to Martinique, from 3rd to the 17th of November 2024, where they trained with the 33rd Marine Infantry Regiment (33e RIMa) of the French Army, that covered familiarization with the FAMAS and mastering individual weaponry, open-area combat, shooting, obstacle course, urban combat techniques, vehicle search and combat first aid. Ambassador Michon, declared the military cooperation between the two nations going into 2025. An official note from the Haitian ministry a meeting between Haitian defense minister Jean-Michel Moïse and the French Ambassador stated that a new technical arrangement would be signed by the Ministries of Defense of both countries to train a new enlisted class starting February 2025.

The second cohort of 25 servicemen would travel to Martinique in February 2025. They returned to the country accompanied by the commander of the FAA, French Navy Admiral Nicolas Lambropoulos, who met with Defense Minister Moise, Lieutenant General Guerrier, and the Ambassador Michon to discuss the fight against Transnational organized crime, Narco-trafficking, and France's continued support to the Haitian Armed Forces and the Defense Ministry. The Haitian Ambassador to France, M. Louino Volcy, held a work meeting with the Directorate-General for international relations and strategy (Direction générale des relations internationales et de la stratégie, DGRIS) to strengthen bilateral defense cooperation.

On April 10, 2025, the French Senate adopted a resolution in favor of restoring security in Haiti. French Minister of Foreign Affairs Jean-Noël Barrot would announce that France will reinforce its support to the Armed Forces of Haiti. A third group of 30 Haitian Army soldiers travelled to Martinique on July 21 2025 for training.

== Resident diplomatic missions ==
- France has an embassy in Port-au-Prince.
- Haiti has an embassy in Paris and consulates-general in Cayenne, French Guiana and in Pointe-à-Pitre, Guadeloupe .
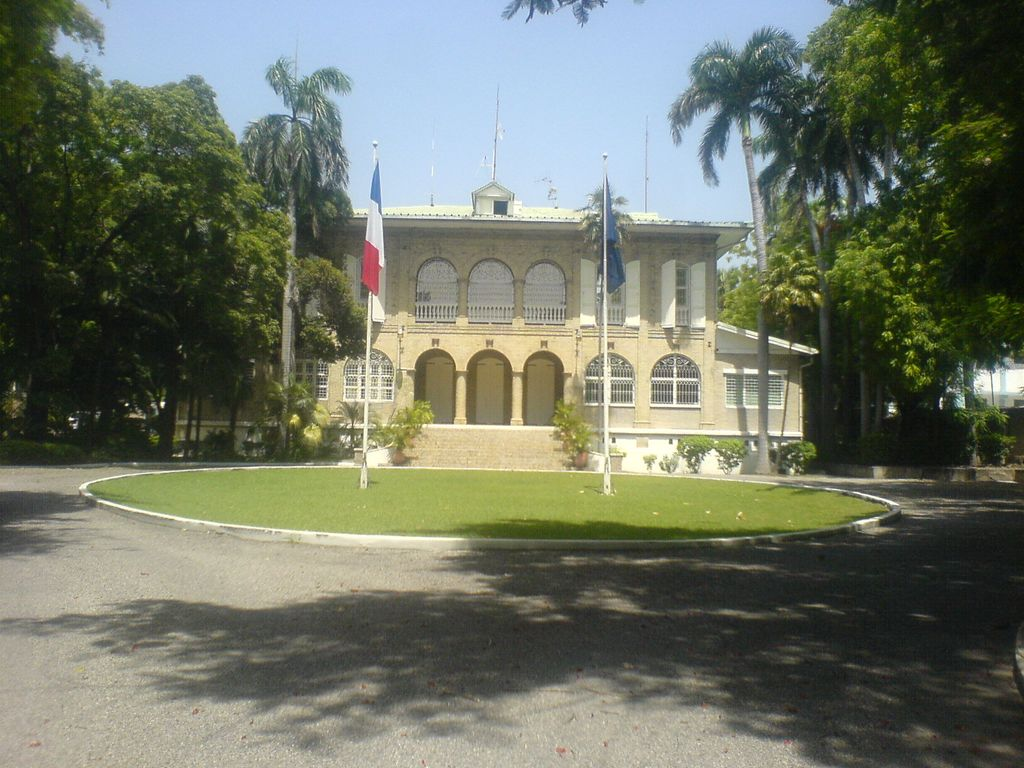
Embassy of France in Port-au-Prince

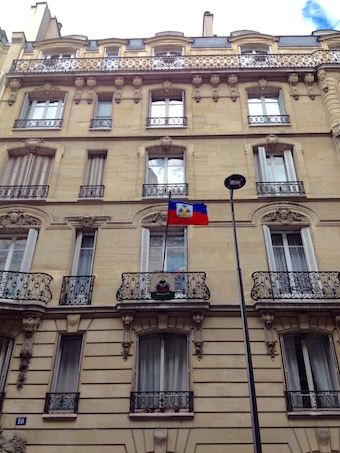
Embassy of Haiti in Paris

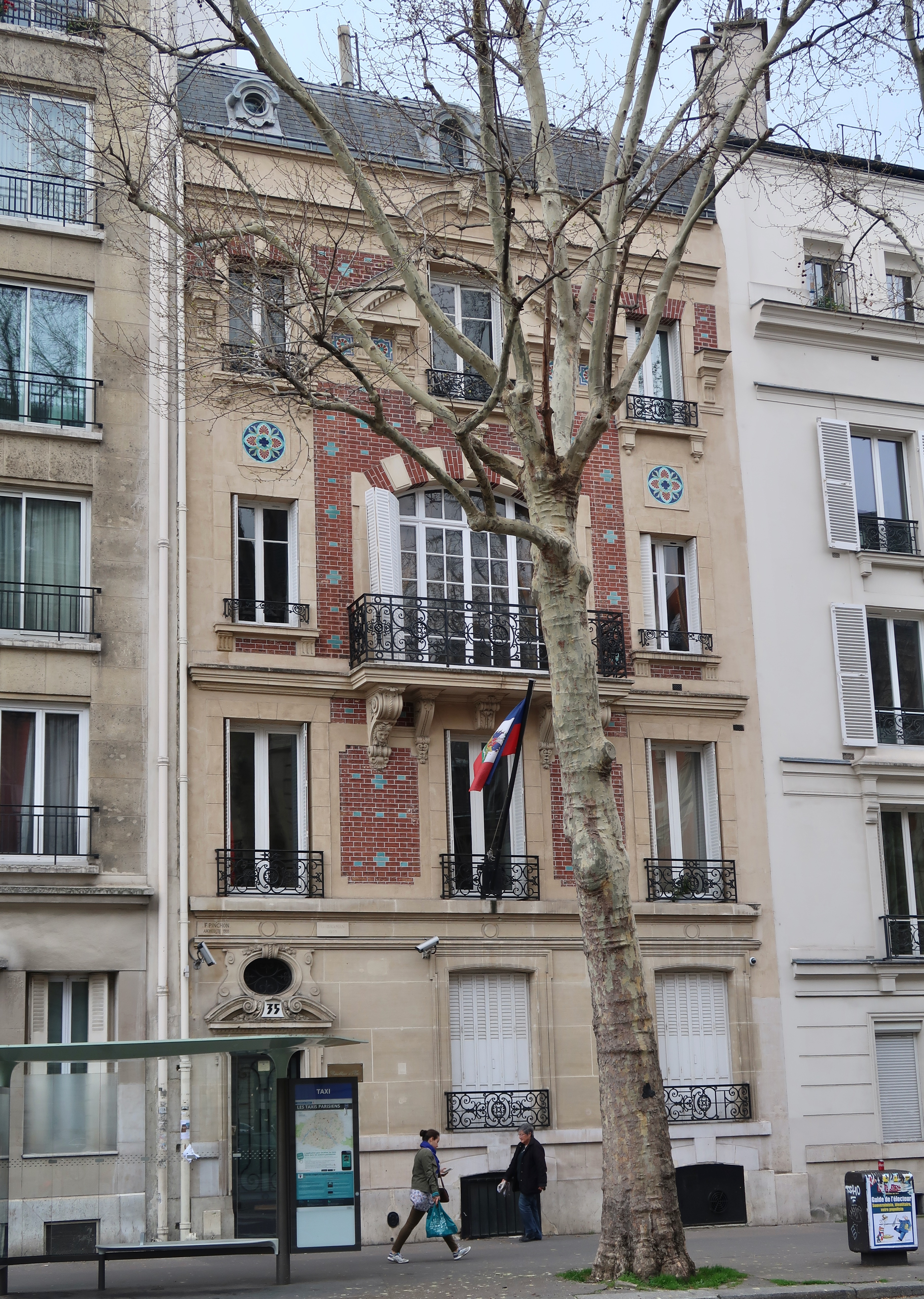
Consulate-General of Haiti in Paris

== See also ==
- Foreign relations of France
- Foreign relations of Haiti
- French Haitians
- Haitians in France
- Haiti indemnity controversy
