= Môle Saint-Nicolas affair =

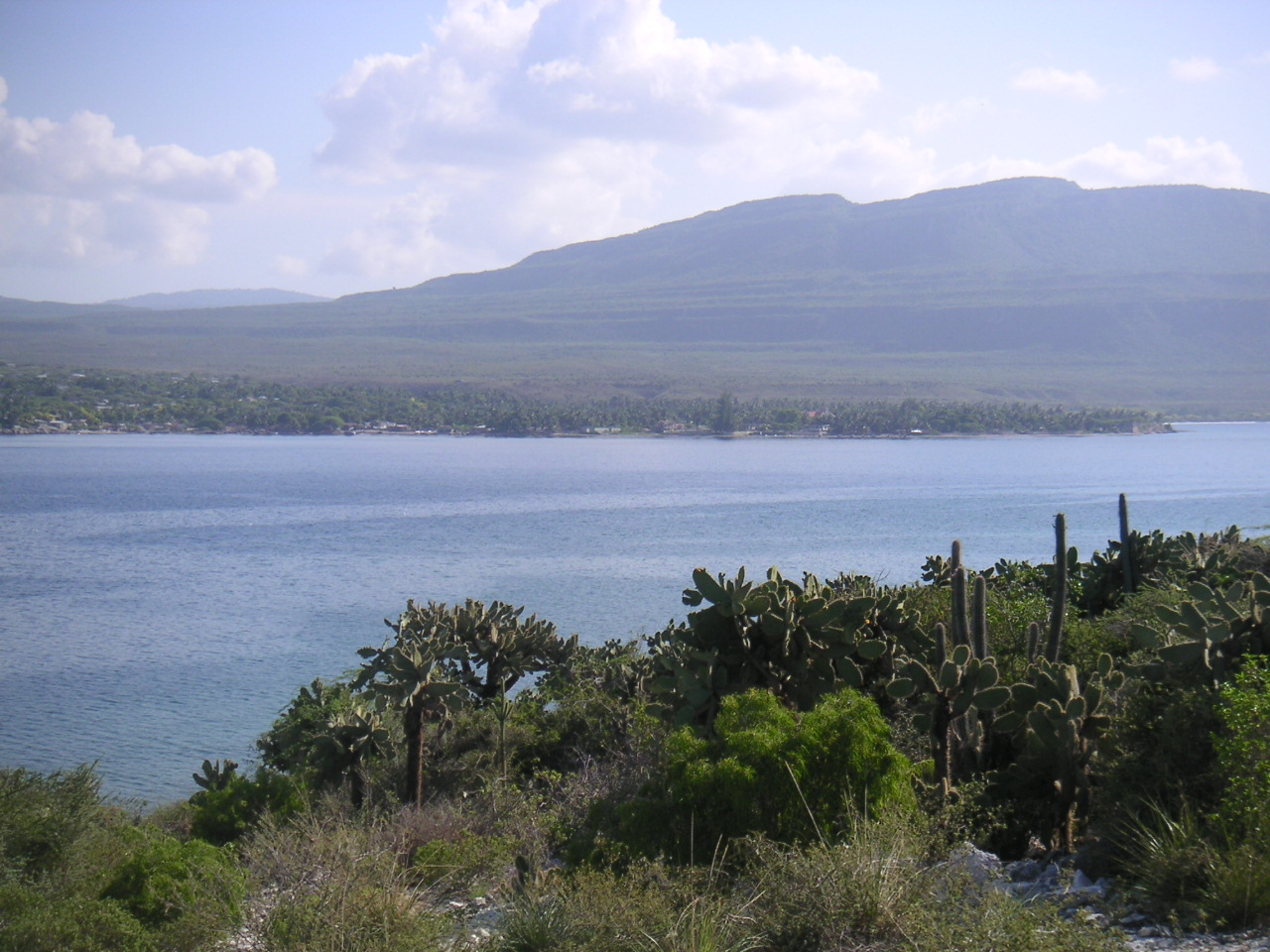
The town of Môle Saint-Nicolas c. 2007

The Môle Saint-Nicolas affair was an 1891 diplomatic incident between Haiti and the United States when in an act of gunboat diplomacy, President of the United States Benjamin Harrison ordered Rear-Admiral Bancroft Gherardi to persuade the cession or lease of Môle Saint-Nicolas to the United States in order to establish a naval base for the United States Navy. Following a prolonged request for Gherardi's diplomatic credentials and increased public pressure, Haiti refused the request of the United States.

== Background ==
The United States had been interested in controlling Haiti in the decades following the Haitian Revolution, when the Caribbean nation won its independence from France. As a way "to secure a U.S. defensive and economic stake in the West Indies", according to the United States Department of State, President Andrew Johnson of the United States began the pursuit of the annexing Hispaniola, including Haiti, in 1868.

=== Hyppolite revolt ===
Haitian general Florvil Hyppolite led a revolt against President of Haiti François Denys Légitime in August 1889. According to The New York Times, General Hyppolite reportedly promised the United States that he would allow the construction of a base for the United States Navy in exchange for assistance with his revolt, though the report says that Môle Saint-Nicolas was never specified as a location. President Légitime would eventually resign and Hyppolite assumed the presidency of Haiti. Shortly after Hyppolite assumed the presidency of Haiti in October 1889, President of the United States Benjamin Harrison, acting under the advice of Secretary of State James G. Blaine, commissioned Rear-Admiral Bancroft Gherardi to negotiate for the acquisition of Môle Saint-Nicolas with the aim of establishing a naval coaling station there.

==== Clyde concession ====
The New York Times wrote of a supposed "Clyde concession" that occurred in late-1889 into 1890:

[Gherardi] was instructed to use his influence and employ his knowledge of Haitian affairs to further the scheme for a line of steamers under the American flag between New York and Boston and Haitian ports, and to pay the owners of this line substantial yearly subsidy.

The Clyde Steamship Company was reportedly the steamer line destined to benefit from the deal, which would force the Haitian government to pay US$50,000 annually for services in a contract lasting ninety nine years. The New York Times stated that the relationship between the Clyde Steamship Company and United States government had "long been a mystery", suggesting that it was possible the company was acting on Secretary Blaine's behalf since a steamer line would not benefit the United States, noting that the "famous harbor once in possession of an American firm, how easy it would be for it to pass into the hands of the Navy Department". The Clyde concession failed and resulted with more direct demands by the United States to acquire the harbor.

== Events ==
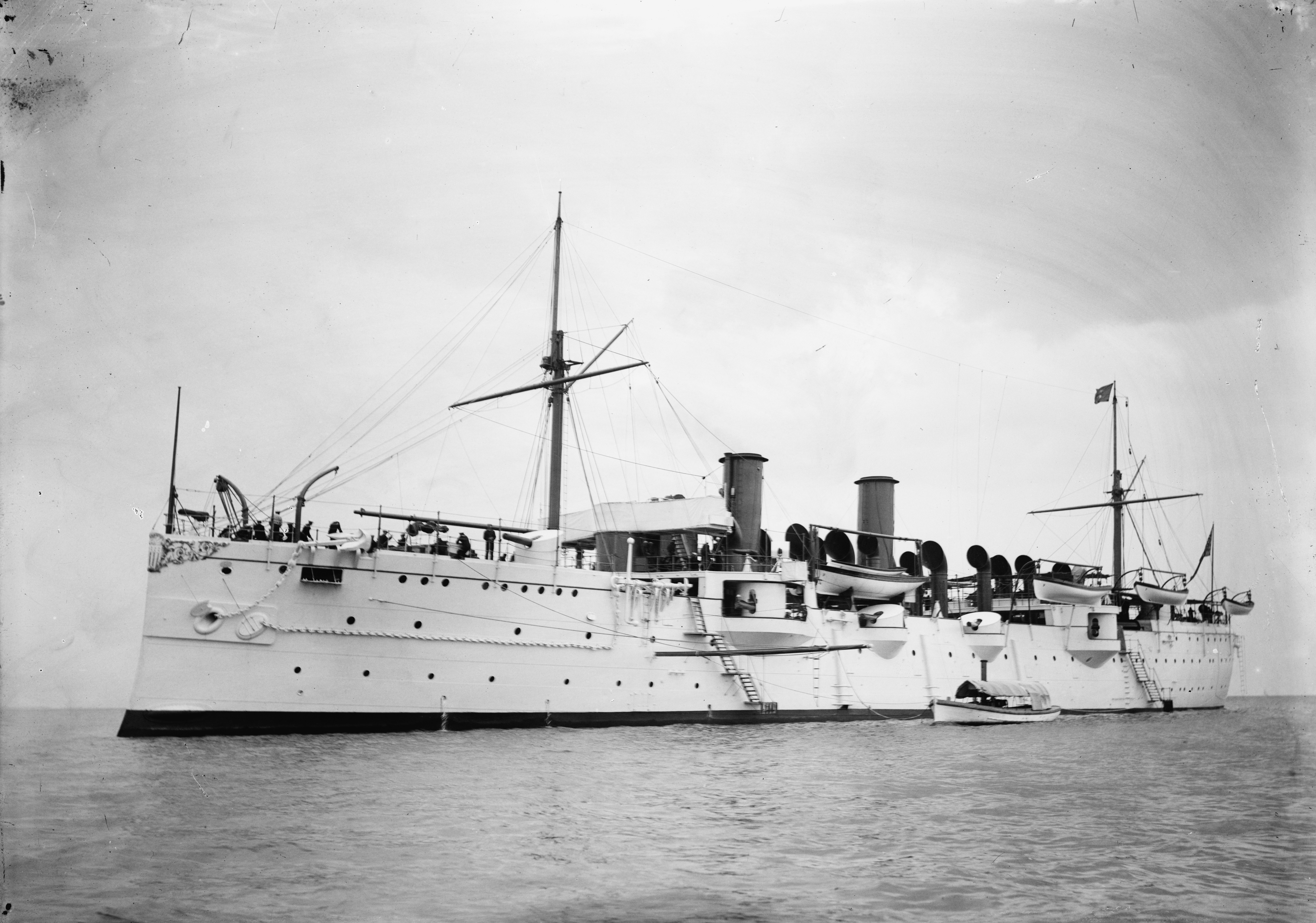
The USS Philadelphia, flagship of the White Squadron tasked with obtaining Môle Saint-Nicolas from Haiti

The USS Philadelphia commanded by rear-Admiral Gherardi arrived in Port-au-Prince in January 1891. Gherardi addressed his demand for Môle Saint-Nicolas to the Haitian Government; his letter contained the additional demand that "[s]o long as the United States may be the lessee of the Môle Saint-Nicolas, the Government of Haiti will not lease or otherwise dispose of any port or harbor or other territory in its dominions, or grant any special privileges or rights of use therein to any other Power, State, or Government." The rear-admiral presented his orders from Secretary Blaine, though Anténor Firmin, then Haitian Secretary of State for Exterior Relations, requested Gherardi's diplomatic credentials since Frederick Douglass, who was at that time United States Minister at Port-au-Prince.

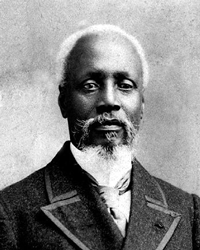
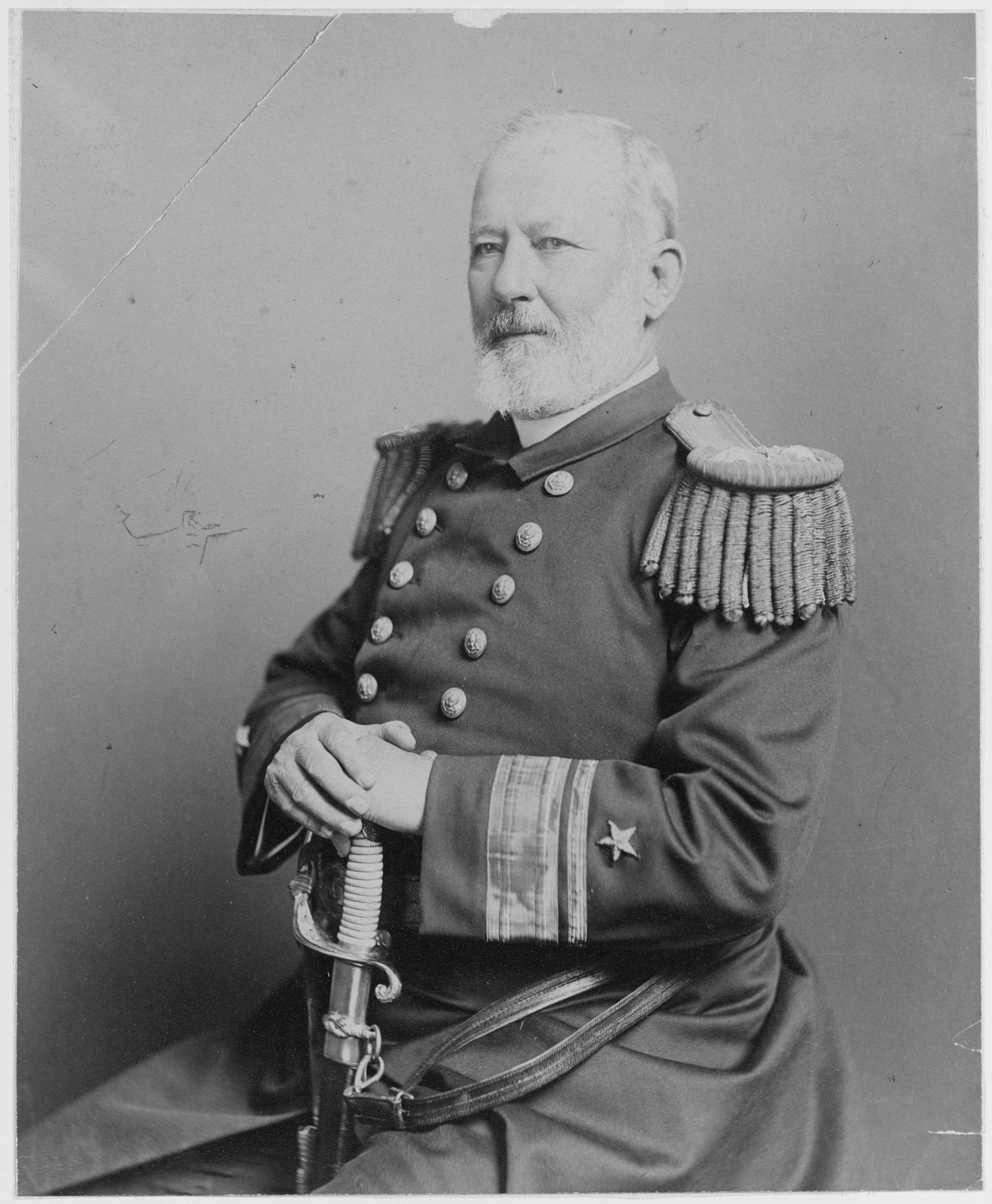
Anténor Firmin (left) and Bancroft Gherardi (right)

Gherardi was then forced to write to Washington D.C. for his credentials on 20 February 1891; having been confident of a swift victory, Gherardi had not attempted to secure the cooperation of Douglass. Secretary Blaine replied to Gherardi saying that his documentation would arrive by the steamship Atlas on 4 March 1891, though when the rear-admiral arrived in Gonaïves, his credentials had not arrived.

In an act of gunboat diplomacy, the White Squadron, which included the USS Dolphin, USS Galena and USS Kearsarge joining the USS Philadelphia for a total of over 100 guns and 2,000 men, was dispatched from Key West to Port-au-Prince on 15 April 1891 with the apparent intention to intimidate the Haitians. By the time Secretary Blaine's letter appointing Gherardi his special Commissioner reached Port-au-Prince, the American squadron had long been in Haiti's waters. The array of force had been counterproductive, provoking loud public protest against the Americans. The New York Times would later write that the Haitians "semi-barbaric minds saw in it a threat of violence". Under these circumstances, President Hyppolite was compelled to stand firm against the Americans. Firmin refused the deal on the grounds that the Constitution of Haiti forbade alienation of any portion of the nation's territory.

== Aftermath ==
These writers, such as [Frederick Douglass] ... , assume to consider Haiti as a responsible member of the family of nations. The world knows what she is and the world is rarely altogether wrong. ... It is absurd to talk of the law to a nation which has no respect for law or its precedents, and the sooner the people of that island are given to understand this the better it will be for all concerned. The United States has exercised rare forbearance and leniency to Haiti. She can afford to, but there is a limit, and Haiti has almost reached it.

— The New York Times

Harrison and Blaine were not discouraged by their failed attempt to acquire Môle Saint-Nicolas. Still bent upon acquiring a naval station in the West Indies, they applied in 1892 to the Dominican Republic. John S. Durham, who had replaced Douglass as Minister at Port-au-Prince and Chargé d'Affaires at Santo Domingo, was instructed to lease Samana Bay for a term of 99 years at a cost of $250,000. The deal ultimately was not consummated.

The New York Times defended rear-admiral Bancroft Gherardi from fallout of the incident, saying that any criticism of the naval officer was "malicious". The newspaper instead blaming Frederick Douglass for the incident and describing him as " pitiable ... for a man of his reputation and position, and is one that no amount of explanation and no number of articles in the North American Review can smooth away". Upon returning to the United States in 1891, Gherardi said in an interview with The New York Times that in a short time Haiti would experience further instability, suggesting that future governments in Haiti would abide by the demands of the United States. Twenty five years after the incident, the United States invaded and occupied Haiti for nineteen years.

== See also ==
- Big Stick ideology
- Imperialism
- Lüders affair
