= Moustapha Keita =

French footballer (born 1980)

Moustapha Keita (born 11 May 1980) is a French former professional footballer who played as a defender or midfielder on the professional level for French Ligue 2 club Brest during the 2005–06 season.

== Career ==
Keita was born in Clichy-la-Garenne, France. He began playing youth football with Fontenay-aux-Roses and Racing Club de Lens. At age 19, he signed his first professional contract with Italian side Cagliari Calcio. He spent three years with the club, including a loan spell in Serie C2 with Vis Pesaro dal 1898. Keita returned to France where he played amateur football for Racing Club de France until 2005. He made his only appearance in professional football with Stade Brestois 29 during the 2005–06 Ligue 2 season.

After he retired from playing, Keita became a football manager. He has led amateur sides, including Monfort and VS Fertois.
