= Adolphe Dureau de la Malle =

French geographer, naturalist, historian and artist

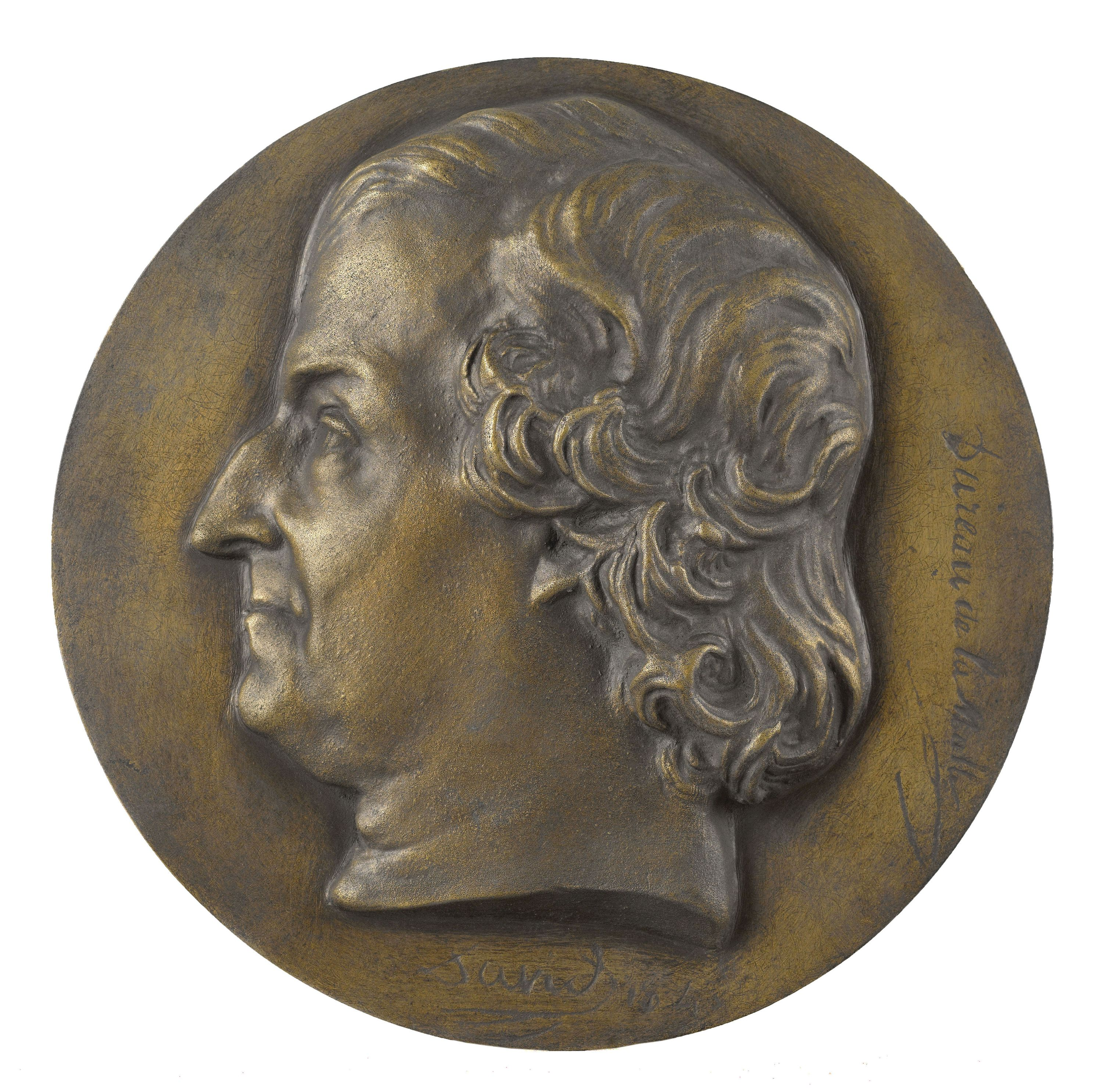

Adolphe Jules César Auguste Dureau de la Malle (3 March 1777 – 17 May 1857) was a French geographer, naturalist, historian and artist. He was the son of the scholar and translator Jean-Baptiste Dureau de la Malle and mother from Saint-Domingue.

Dureau de la Malle published a number of works on the economy and topography of the classic countries, i.e. Italy and Carthage at the time of the Roman Empire:

- On the population in ancient Italy (De la Population de l'Italie ancienne) (1825)
- On agriculture, administration and units of measurement of the Romans (De l'Agriculture, de l'Administration, des Poids et Mesures des Romains) (1827–1828)
- On the topography of Carthage (De la Topographie de Carthage) (1835).

As a naturalist, he published on the origins of the cereal crops.

- De l'Origine et de la patrie des Céréales (1819 et 1826)

and, his most significant work, on vegetation succession.

- Mémoire sur l'alternance ou sur ce problème: la succession alternative dans la reproduction des espèces végétales vivant en société, est-elle une loi générale de la nature. Annales des sciences naturelles, 15 (1825): 353–381. Rendered in English: Memoir on alternation or on alternative succession in the reproduction of plant species living in a community – is it a general law of nature?

Here he present results of his observations in clear-cut forests. He was the first to use the term succession (prior to Steenstrups use) about an ecological phenomenon and probably the first to use the term community (ecology) (societé) for an assemblage of (plant) individuals of different species (prior to Karl Möbius).
