= Monpoint Jeune =

Haitian politician (1830–1905)

Provisional President of Haiti
- In office 23 August 1889 – 17 October 1889
- Preceded by: François Denys Légitime
- Succeeded by: Florvil Hyppolite

Borno Monpoint, better known as Monpoint Jeune (French pronunciation: [mɔ̃pwɛ̃ ʒœn]), served as president of Haiti from 23 August to 17 October 1889.

As general, he put down a revolt in March 1878 against president Pierre Théoma Boisrond-Canal.

After President François Denys Légitime, he was designated on the 23 August 1889 as president of the provisional government and interim president of Haiti.

On 17 October 1889, he was replaced as president by the minister of Agriculture, Florvil Hyppolite.

== See also ==
- List of heads of state of Haiti
