= Clichy, Hauts-de-Seine =

Clichy
- Commune
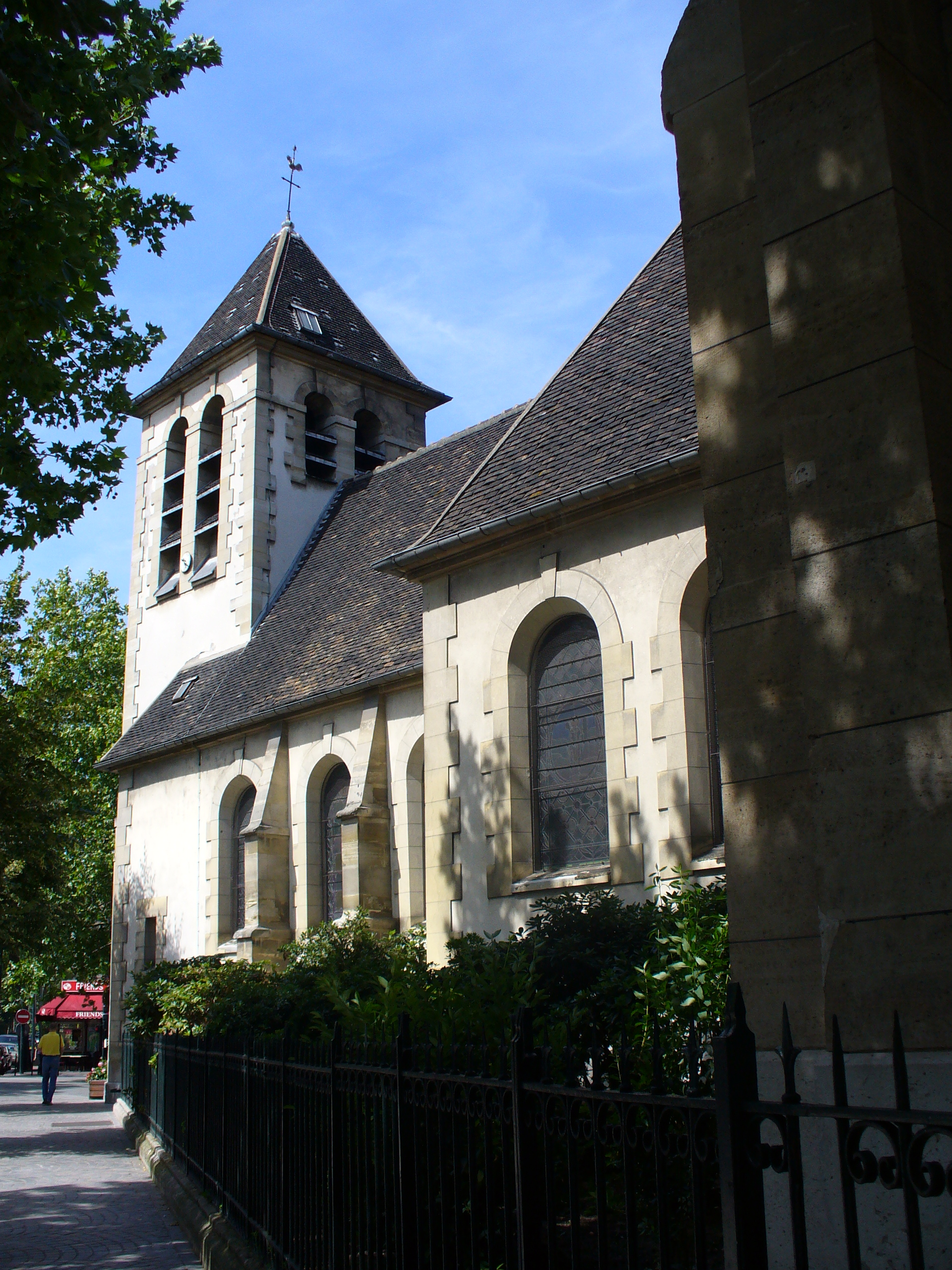
- The church of Saint-Vincent-de-Paul, in Clichy

- Coat of arms

- Location of Clichy
- Location within France Location within Île-de-France (region)
- Coordinates: 48°54′16″N 2°18′23″E
- Country: France
- Region: Île-de-France
- Department: Hauts-de-Seine
- Arrondissement: Nanterre
- Canton: Clichy
- Intercommunality: Grand Paris

Government
  - Mayor (2026–32): Rémi Muzeau
- Area^{1}: 3.08 km^{2} (1.19 sq mi)
- Population (2023): 64,410
  - Density: 20,900/km^{2} (54,200/sq mi)
- Time zone: UTC+01:00 (CET)
  - Summer (DST): UTC+02:00 (CEST)
- INSEE/Postal code: 92024 /92110
- ^{1} French Land Register data, which excludes lakes, ponds, glaciers > 1 km^{2} (0.386 sq mi or 247 acres) and river estuaries.

Clichy (/kliːˈʃiː/ klee-SHEE, French: [kliʃi]; sometimes unofficially Clichy-la-Garenne [kliʃi la ɡaʁɛn]) is a commune in the northwestern suburbs of Paris, France. It is located on the Seine, 6.4 km (4.0 mi) from the centre of Paris.

Located in Clichy are the headquarters of the L'Oréal Group, the world's largest company in cosmetics and beauty; Bic, one of the biggest pen producers in the world; Monoprix, a major French retail chain; as well as Sony France, a large electronics and media company.

== Name ==
The name Clichy was recorded for the first time in the 6th century as Clippiacum, later corrupted into Clichiacum, meaning "estate of Cleppius", a Gallo-Roman landowner.

In the 13th century, the plain of Clichy was used as a garenne ("warren" in English), i.e. a hunting park and game preserve for the exclusive use of the king or a lord. Clichy became known as Clichy-la-Garenne ("Clichy the Warren" or preserve).

Between 1793 and 1795, during the French Revolution, Clichy-la-Garenne was renamed Clichy-la-Patriote (meaning "Clichy the Patriot"), perhaps because the word garenne reminded people of the feudal privileges that the new government abolished in 1789.

After the Revolution, the French administration officially recorded the name of the commune only as Clichy, dropping the "la-Garenne". This is the term in use in the 21st century. But, in many instances the municipality of Clichy refers to the commune traditionally as Clichy-la-Garenne, although this has not been the official name for more than 200 years.

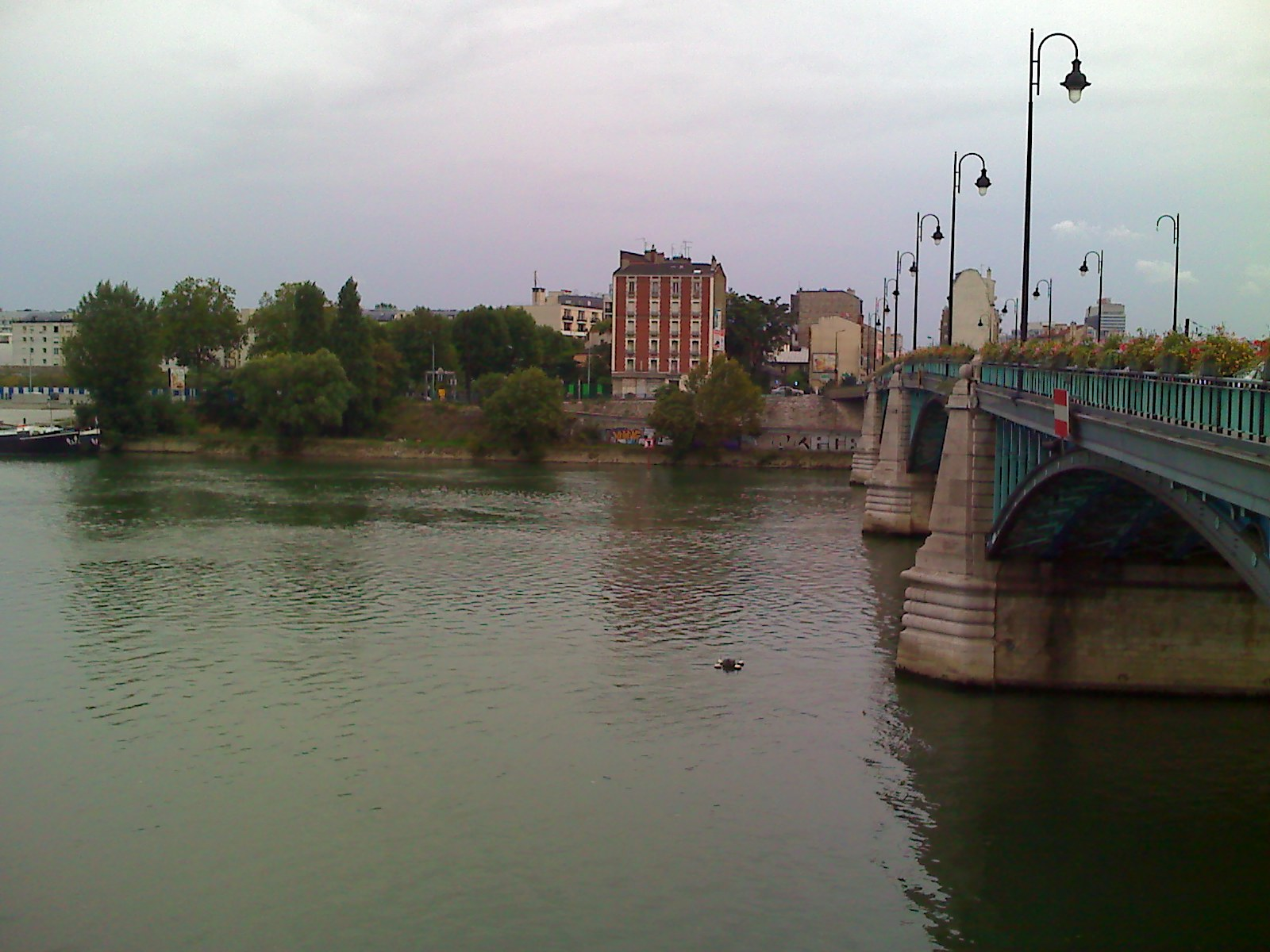
The wharf and bridge of Clichy.

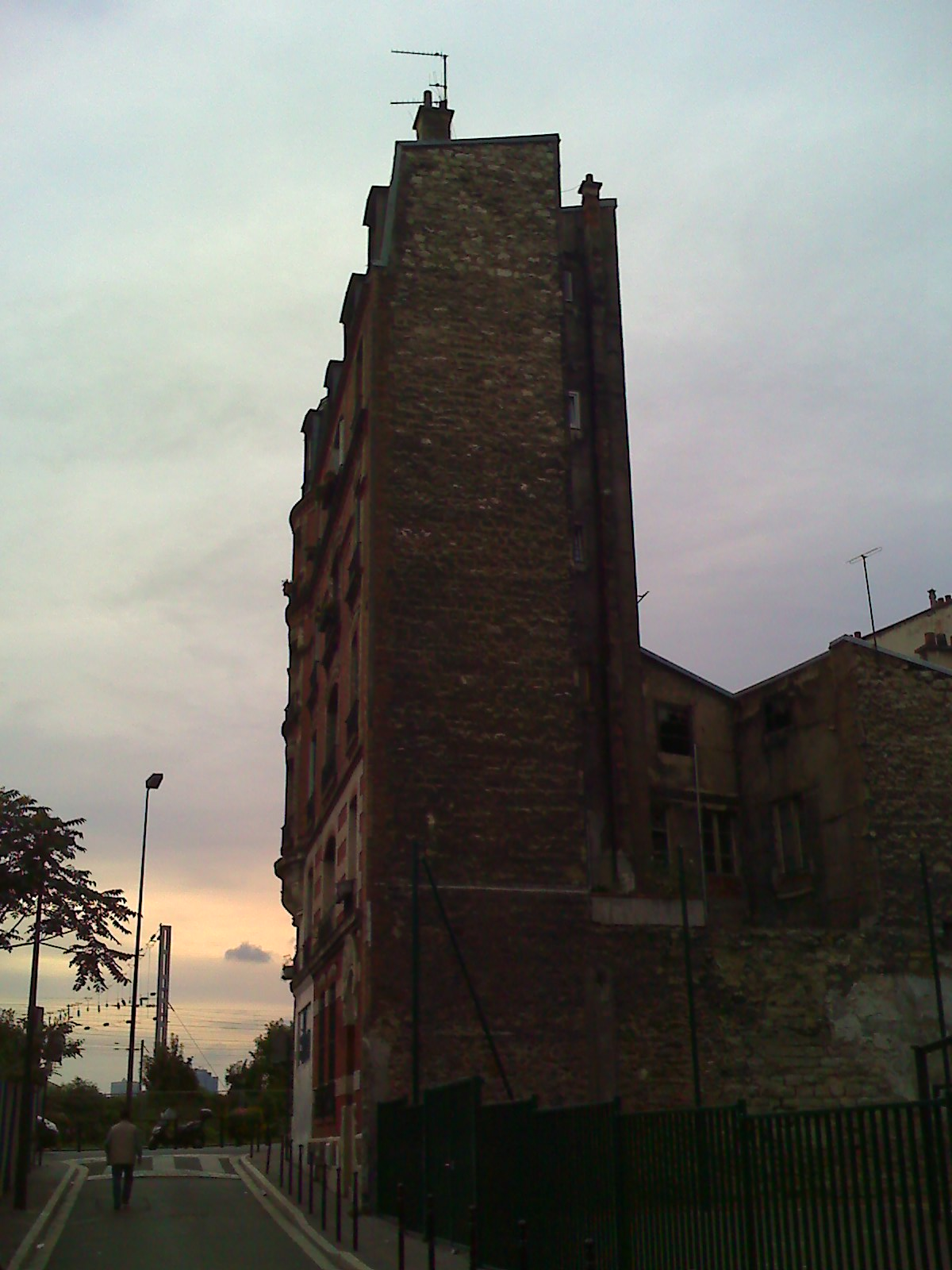
Passage Berthier.

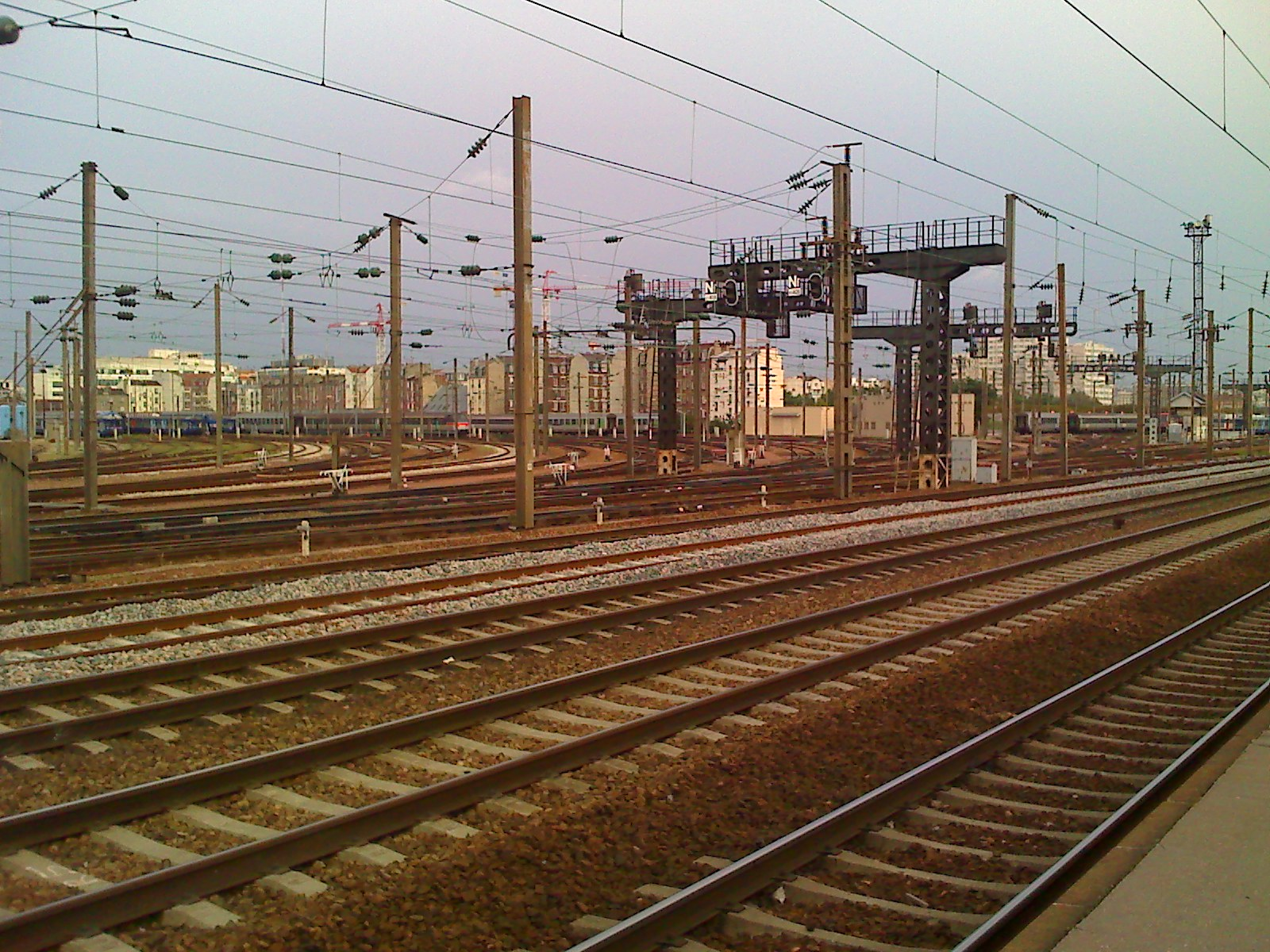
Railway station.

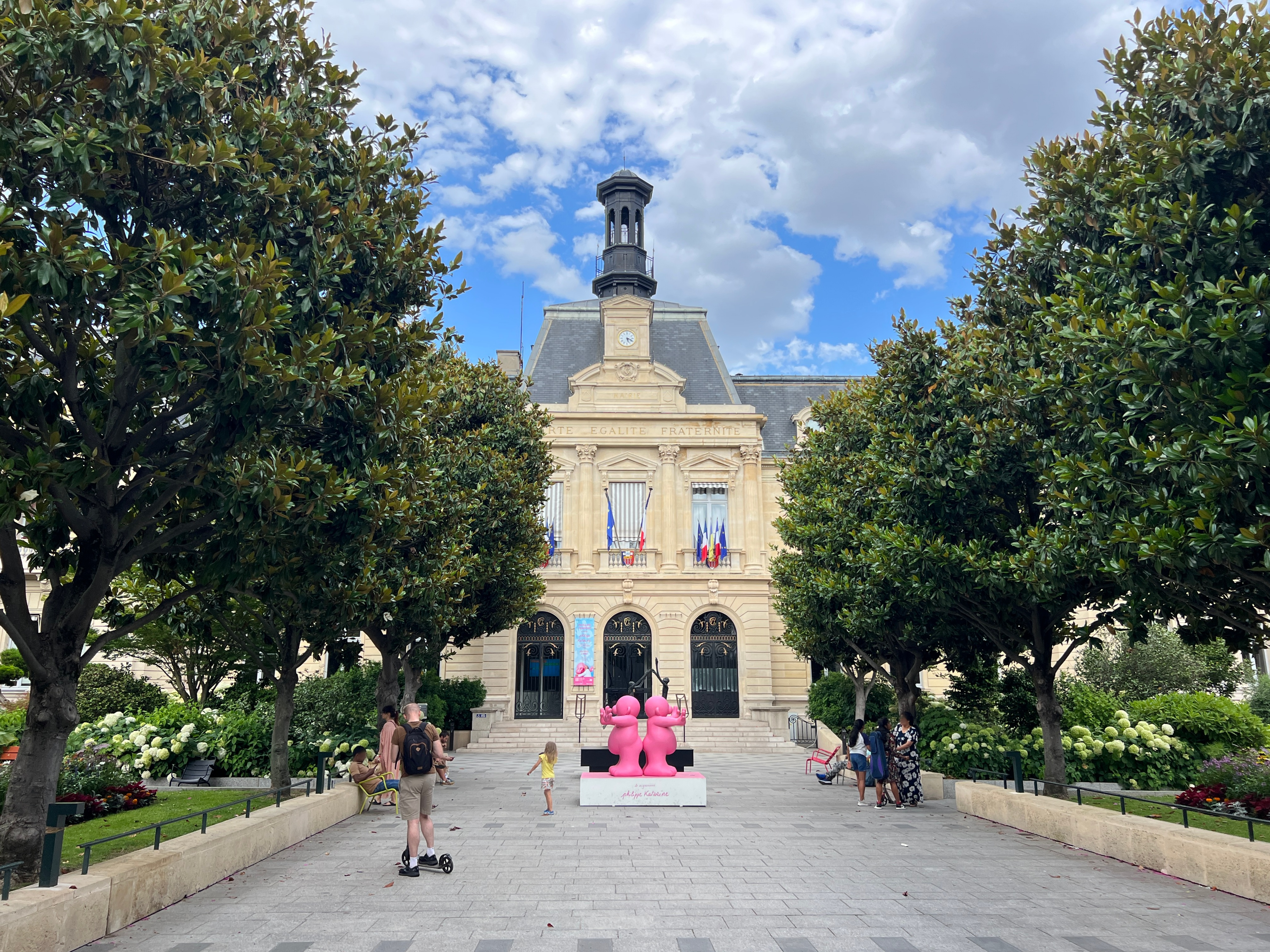
The Hôtel de Ville

== History ==
Clichy was the capital of the Merovingians during the rule of Dagobert I.

Its church was built in the 17th century under the direction of St Vincent de Paul, who had previously been curé of Clichy.

In 1830, part of the territory of Clichy was detached and became the commune of Batignolles-Monceau. On 1 January 1860, the city of Paris annexed neighboring communes, taking most of Batignolles-Monceau, which now forms the major part of the 17th arrondissement of Paris. A small part of the territory of Batignolles-Monceau was returned to Clichy.

On 11 January 1867, part of the territory of Clichy was detached and merged with a part of the territory of Neuilly-sur-Seine to create the commune of Levallois-Perret.

The Hôtel de Ville was completed in 1878.

== Population ==
The population data in the table and graph below refer to the commune of Clichy proper, in its geography at the given years. The commune of Clichy ceded the commune of Batignolles-Monceau in 1830, and reabsorbed part of it in 1859. In 1866 it ceded part of its territory to the new commune of Levallois-Perret.

Historical population

Year	Pop.	±% p.a.
1793	1,360	—
1800	1,606	+2.40%
1806	1,279	−3.72%
1821	3,018	+5.89%
1831	3,097	+0.26%
1836	3,605	+3.08%
1841	4,157	+2.89%
1846	5,911	+7.29%
1851	6,433	+1.71%
1856	12,270	+13.79%
1861	17,473	+7.33%
1866	13,666	−4.80%
1872	14,599	+1.11%
1876	17,354	+4.42%
1881	24,320	+6.98%
1886	26,741	+1.92%
1891	30,698	+2.80%
1896	33,895	+2.00%
1901	39,521	+3.12%

Year	Pop.	±% p.a.
1906	41,787	+1.12%
1911	46,676	+2.24%
1921	50,165	+0.72%
1926	50,427	+0.10%
1931	55,692	+2.01%
1936	56,475	+0.28%
1946	53,029	−0.63%
1954	55,591	+0.59%
1962	56,316	+0.16%
1968	52,477	−1.17%
1975	47,764	−1.34%
1982	46,895	−0.26%
1990	48,030	+0.30%
1999	50,179	+0.49%
2007	58,646	+1.97%
2012	59,240	+0.20%
2017	61,070	+0.61%
2023	64,410	+0.89%

Source: EHESS and INSEE (1968-2023)

=== Immigration ===
Place of birth of residents of Clichy in 1999
Born in metropolitan France	Born outside metropolitan France			
70.9%	29.1%			
70.9%	Born in overseas France	Born in foreign countries with French citizenship at birth^{1}	EU-15 immigrants^{2}	Non-EU-15 immigrants
70.9%	2.4%	2.6%	4.1%	20.0%
^{1} This group is made up largely of former French settlers, such as pieds-noirs in Northwest Africa, followed by former colonial citizens who had French citizenship at birth (such as was often the case for the native elite in French colonies), as well as to a lesser extent foreign-born children of French expatriates. A foreign country is understood as a country not part of France in 1999, so a person born for example in 1950 in Algeria, when Algeria was an integral part of France, is nonetheless listed as a person born in a foreign country in French statistics.^{2} An immigrant is a person born in a foreign country not having French citizenship at birth. An immigrant may have acquired French citizenship since moving to France, but is still considered an immigrant in French statistics. On the other hand, persons born in France with foreign citizenship (the children of immigrants) are not listed as immigrants.

== Administration ==
The canton covers a part of the commune; the other is in the northern part of Levallois-Perret.

== International relations ==
Clichy is twinned with:

- Heidenheim an der Brenz, Baden-Württemberg, Germany, since 1959
- Sankt Pölten, Lower Austria, Austria, since 1968
- Santo Tirso, District of Porto, Portugal, since 1991
- Rubí, Catalonia, Spain, since 2005
- (England) Southwark, London, United Kingdom since 2005
- (Wales) Merthyr Tydfil, Mid Glamorgan, United Kingdom Since 1981

== Economy ==
L'Oréal Group has its head office in the Centre Eugène Schueller in Clichy.

In addition, Monoprix has its head office in Clichy. Société Bic has its head office in Clichy.

At one time Fnac had its head office in Clichy. In 2008 the head office moved to Ivry-sur-Seine.

Amazon has its French Head Office in Clichy.

== Transport ==
Clichy is served by Mairie de Clichy station on Paris Métro Line 13.

It is also served by Clichy–Levallois station on the Transilien Paris-Saint-Lazare suburban rail line.

== Education ==
The commune has 22 primary schools, three junior high schools, and two senior high schools. The junior highs include:

- Collège Jean Jaurès
- Collège Jean Macé
- Collège Vincent Van Gogh

The senior high schools are:

- Lycée Newton
- Lycée René Auffray

== Notable persons ==
- Olivier Messiaen, French composer, died here.
- Henry Miller, American author, lived with Alfred Perlès at 4 avenue Anatole France from 1932 to 1934.
- Jean-Luc Rougé, 1975 world Judo champion
- Feta Ahamada, athlete
- Audrey Bruneau, handball player
- Carlos (singer), singer
- Rochel Chery, basketball player
- Claude Dielna, footballer
- Vincent Doukantie, footballer
- Karichma Ekoh, handball player
- Gwladys Épangue, taekwondo athlete
- Jeremy Helan, footballer
- Julian Jeanvier, footballer
- Moustapha Keita, footballer
- Aïssatou Kouyaté, handball player
- Souleymane M'Baye, boxer
- Windsor Noncent, footballer
- Steed Tchicamboud, basketball player
- Brice Tutu, footballer
- Jacques Mesrine, French criminal, known as the French Robin Hood
- Thomas Piketty, economist
- Jeanine Claes, artist, dancer, choreographer and dance teacher
- Moussa Sissako, footballer
- Abdoulaye Sissako, footballer
- Riyad Mahrez, footballer

== See also ==
- Communes of the Hauts-de-Seine department
