= Canton of Clichy =

Administrative division of Hauts-de-Seine, France

Coordinates: 48.90°N 2.31°E

The canton of Clichy is an administrative division of the Hauts-de-Seine department, in northern France. Its borders were not modified at the French canton reorganisation which came into effect in March 2015. Its seat is in Clichy.

It consists of the following communes:

1. Clichy
