= Mauves-sur-Huisne =

- Commune
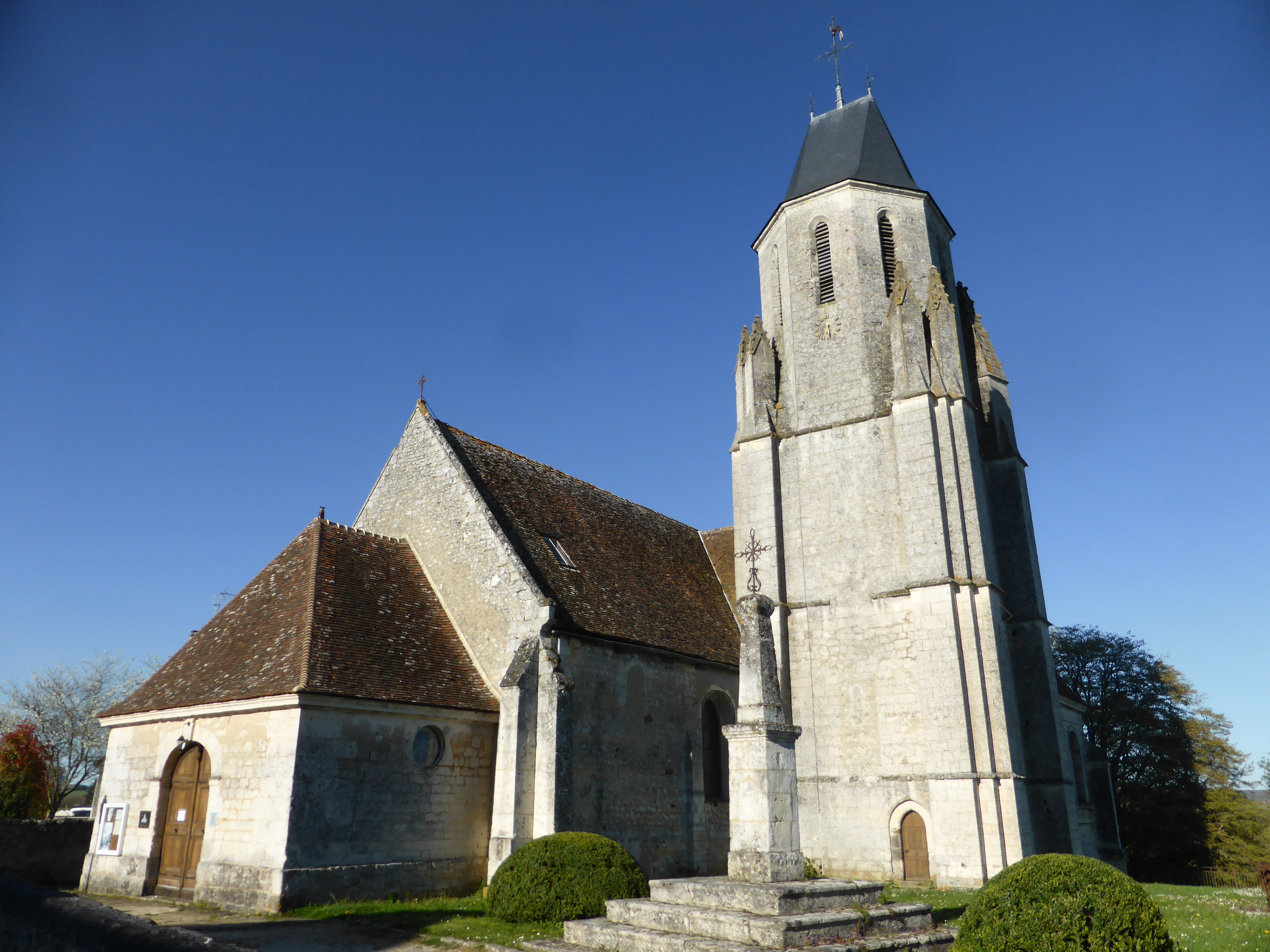
- The church in Mauves-sur-Huisne
- Location of Mauves-sur-Huisne
- Location within France Location within Normandy
- Coordinates: 48°27′00″N 0°37′16″E
- Country: France
- Region: Normandy
- Department: Orne
- Arrondissement: Mortagne-au-Perche
- Canton: Mortagne-au-Perche
- Intercommunality: Pays de Mortagne au Perche

Government
  - Mayor (2020–2026): Jean-Pierre Rocton
- Area^{1}: 14.26 km^{2} (5.51 sq mi)
- Elevation: 152 m (499 ft)
- Highest elevation: 262 m (860 ft)
- Lowest elevation: 132 m (433 ft)
- Population (2023): 533
  - Density: 37.4/km^{2} (96.8/sq mi)
- Time zone: UTC+01:00 (CET)
  - Summer (DST): UTC+02:00 (CEST)
- INSEE/Postal code: 61255 /61400
- ^{1} French Land Register data, which excludes lakes, ponds, glaciers > 1 km^{2} (0.386 sq mi or 247 acres) and river estuaries.

Mauves-sur-Huisne (French pronunciation: [mov syʁ ɥin], literally Mauves on Huisne) is a commune in the Orne department in north-western France.

== Geography ==
Mauves-sur-Huisne is made up of the following collection of villages and hamlets, Mauves-sur-Huisne, Le Moulin de Mauves, La Boisardière and La Blanchardière.

The commune, along with another 70 communes, shares part of a 47,681 hectare, Natura 2000 conservation area, called the Forêts et étangs du Perche.

The river Huisne flows through the commune. In addition La Chippe and Le Chêne Galon are another two watercourses that traverses through the commune.

== Points of interest ==
=== National heritage sites ===
The Commune has two buildings and areas listed as a Monument historique.

- Bridge in Mauves-sur-Huisne the bridge was built between 1610–11, it was registered as a monument in 1939.
- Saint-Pierre Church a thirteenth century church, registered as a Monument historique in 1975.

== Notable people ==
- Jean-Baptiste Dureau de la Malle - (1742 - 1807) a Saint Dominican writer of French literature and translator, who died here.

== See also ==
- Communes of the Orne department
