= Hôtel de Ville, Clichy =

Town hall in Clichy, Hauts-de-Seine, France

Hôtel de Ville
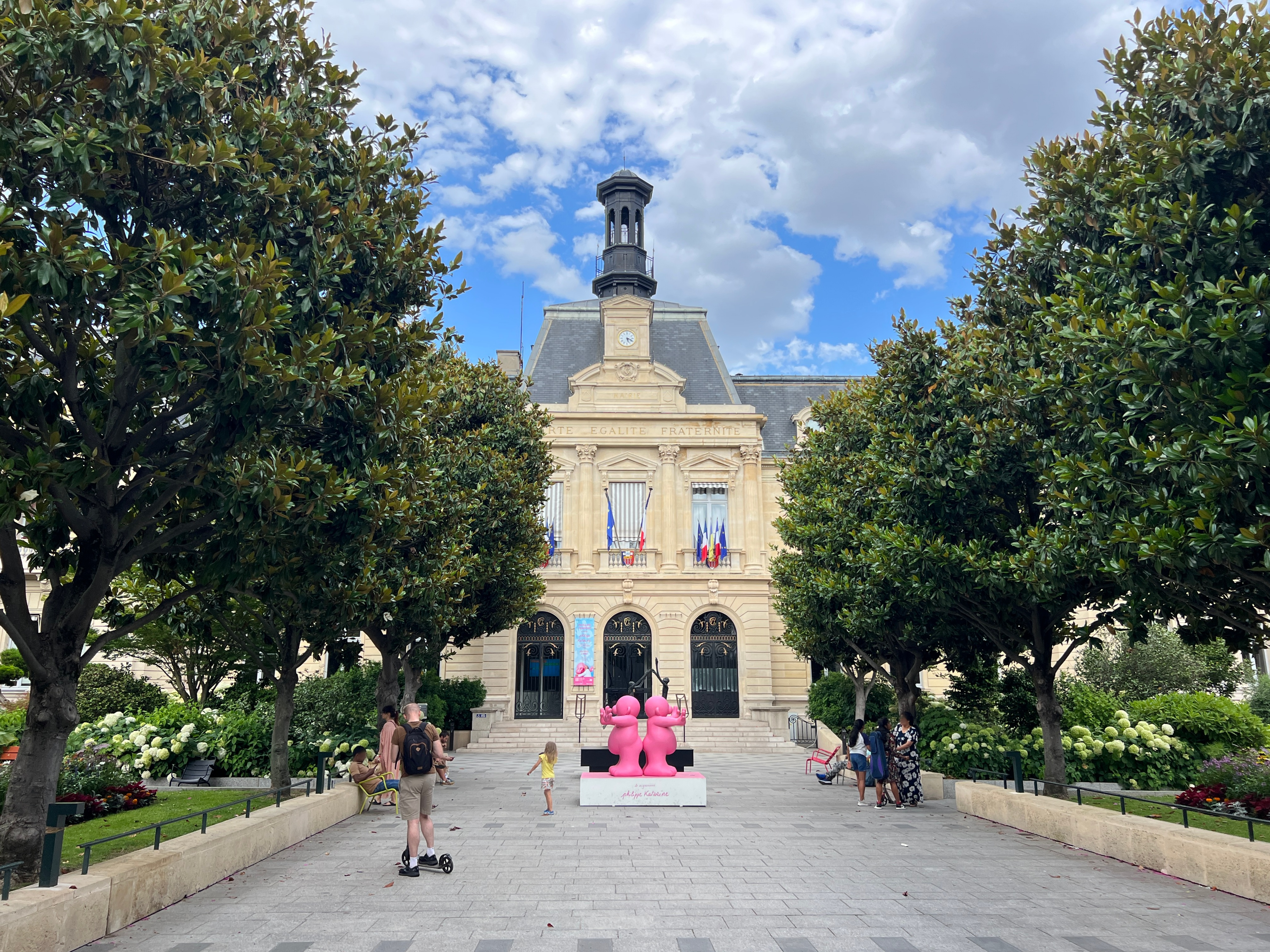
- The main frontage of the Hôtel de Ville in July 2023
- Interactive map of the Hôtel de Ville area

General information
- Type: City hall
- Architectural style: Neoclassical style
- Location: Clichy, France
- Coordinates: 48.9028°N 2.3049°E
- Completed: 1878

Design and construction
- Architect: Jules Depoix

The Hôtel de Ville (French pronunciation: [otɛl də vil], City Hall) is a municipal building in Clichy, Hauts-de-Seine, in the northwestern suburbs of Paris, standing on Boulevard Jean-Jaurès. It has been included on the Inventaire général des monuments by the French Ministry of Culture since 1994.

== History ==
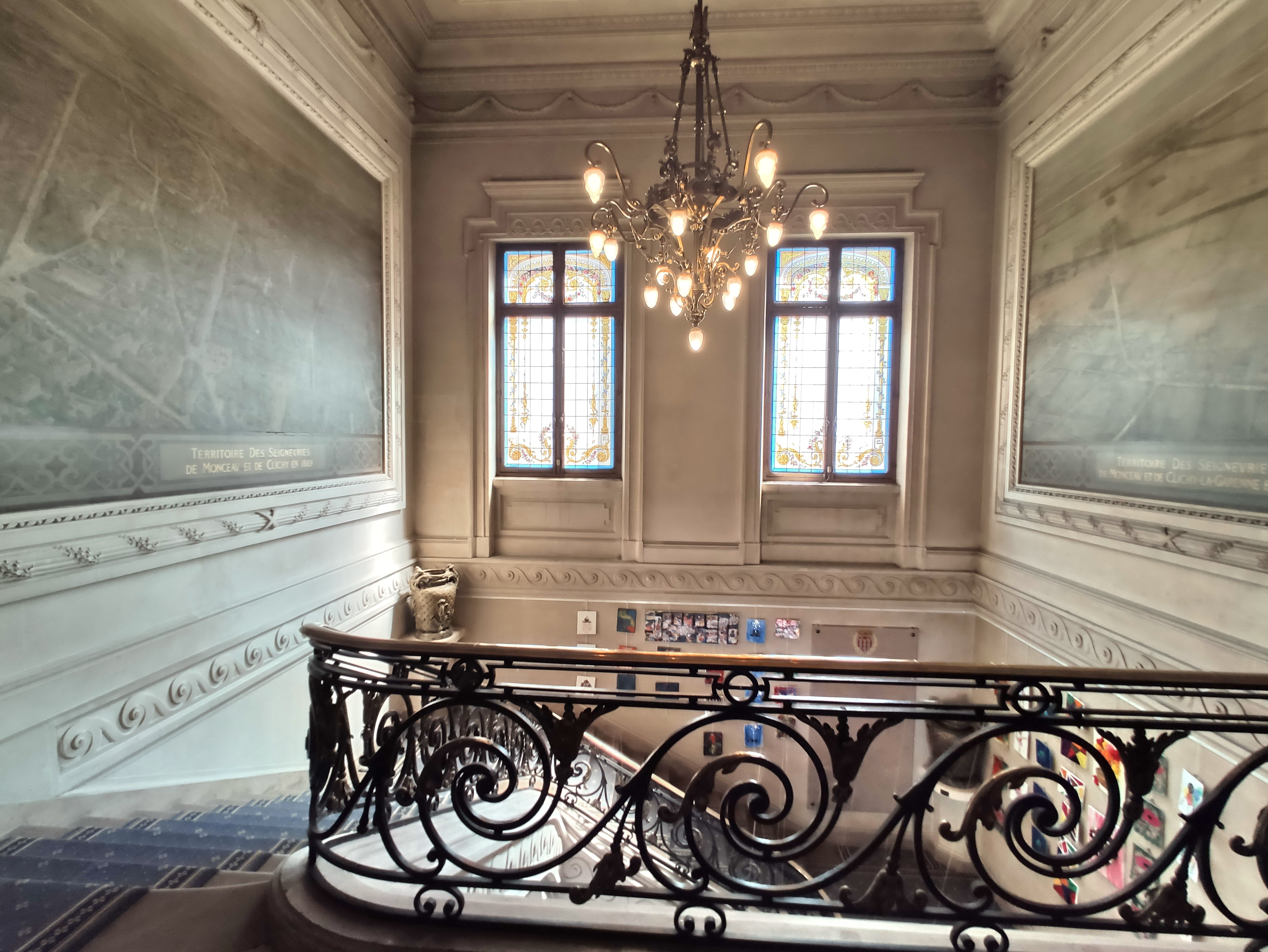
The main staircase

Following the French Revolution, the new town council initially met in a building known as the Maison Commune, the location of which is no longer known, but later relocated to a building on Rue du Landy, which had been designed by Paul-Eugène Lequeux and completed in 1836. In August 1870, in the context of the threat of the Franco-Prussian War, the council relocated to the relative safety of No. 38 Rue Saint-Pétersbourg in central Paris.

After the threat had subsided, the council led by the mayor, Aimé Monod, decided to commission a new town hall. The site they selected was on the east side of what is now Boulevard Jean-Jaurès. The building was designed by Jules Depoix in the neoclassical style, built in ashlar stone and was officially opened by the mayor, Jean-Louis Villeneuve, in February 1878.

The original design involved a symmetrical main frontage of nine bays facing onto Boulevard Jean-Jaurès. The central section of three bays, which was slightly projected forward, featured three round-headed openings with voussoirs and keystones. On the first floor, there were three French doors with triangular pediments and balustrades, flanked by Corinthian order columns supporting an entablature and a cornice. Above the central bay, there was an open pediment containing a clock supported by statues of reclining women created by the sculptor, Adolphe Pierre Leleux. Behind the clock, there was an octagonal lantern. The wings of three bays each were fenestrated by casement windows with voussoirs on the ground floor, by casement windows with cornices on the first floor, and by oculi at attic level. Internally, the principal rooms were the Salle des Mariages (wedding room) and the Salle du Conseil (council chamber). The paintings in the wedding room were created by Oscar Mathieu, while the fresco in the council chamber was the work of Eugène Béringuier.

In the early 20th century, the council led by the mayor, Anatole Laruelle, decided to extend the wings. The work, which was carried out to a design by Bertrand Sincholle, involved the creation of a large end-pavilions, with prominent semi-circular pediments. The enlarged town hall was officially opened by the President of France, Armand Fallières, in 1907.

In March 1937, after a large crowd of anti-fascist demonstrators assembled outside the town hall, the police opened fire on them, leaving six demonstrators dead and 300 injured. Some demonstrators fled inside the building to escape injury.

During the Paris insurrection of 19 August 1944, part the Second World War, the town hall was initially seized by unidentified young Frenchmen, before the Francs-Tireurs et Partisans and then the French Forces of the Interior took control. This was a week in advance of the official liberation of the town by the French 2nd Armoured Division, commanded by General Philippe Leclerc, on 25 August 1944.

In 1995, a car park which had previously stood in front of the town hall was landscaped to create a garden.
