= François Denys Légitime =

President of Haiti from 1888 to 1889

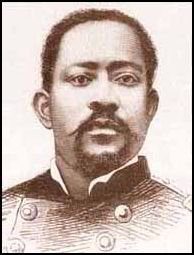

Member of the State Council representing Sud
- In office June 22, 1918 – June 5, 1919

14th President of Haiti
- In office December 16, 1888 – August 22, 1889
- Preceded by: Pierre Théoma Boisrond-Canal
- Succeeded by: Monpoint Jeune

Chief of the Executif Branch of Haiti
- In office October 16, 1888 – December 16, 1888
- Preceded by: Pierre Théoma Boisrond-Canal
- Succeeded by: Himself

Member of the Provisional Government of Haiti
- In office September 1, 1888 – October 16, 1888
- President: Pierre Théoma Boisrond-Canal

Minister of Foreign Affairs and Worship
- In office September 1, 1888 – December 16, 1888
- President: Pierre Théoma Boisrond-Canal
- Preceded by: Brutus Saint-Victor
- Succeeded by: Eugène Margron (Foreign Affairs); Massillon Lauture (Worship)

Minister of Agriculture, Interior, Education, Worship and Justice
- In office August 26, 1881 – December 31, 1881
- President: Lysius Salomon
- Preceded by: Himself (Agriculture and Interior); Charles Archin (Education, Worship and Justice)
- Succeeded by: François Manigat (Agriculture and Education); Edouard Pickombe (Interior); Thomas Madiou (Justice and Worship)

Minister of Agriculture, Finance, Commerce and Interior
- In office January 9, 1881 – August 26, 1881
- President: Lysius Salomon
- Preceded by: Himself (Agriculture, Finance and Commerce); Evarise Laroche (Interior)
- Succeeded by: Himself (Agriculture and Interior); Brutus Saint-Victor (Finance and Commerce)

Minister of Agriculture, Finance and Commerce
- In office December 9, 1880 – January 9, 1881
- President: Lysius Salomon
- Preceded by: Evariste Laroche
- Succeeded by: Himself

Personal details
- Born: François Déus Légitime; November 20, 1841 Jérémie, Haiti
- Died: July 29, 1935 (aged 93) Port-au-Prince
- Party: Liberal Party
- Spouse: Rose Marie Isaure Marion
- Occupation: Military general

François Denys Légitime (French pronunciation: [fʁɑ̃swa dəni leʒitim]; November 20, 1841 – July 29, 1935) was a Haitian general who served as President of Haiti from 1888 to 1889.

== Biography ==
Légitime was born in Jérémie, Haiti, on 20 November 1841 to Denys Légitime and Tinette Lespérance. Lespérance was a grandson of Modeste Testas. Légitime married Rose-Marie Isaure Marion and had nine children: Cuvier, Edmond, Angèle, Antoinette, Denis Jr., Léon, Clemence, Marie, and Agnès.

He served as adjutant general during the government of Fabre Geffrard, and as aide-de-camp during the government of Sylvain Salnave. He was Secretary of State of the Interior and then Secretary of State of the Interior and of Agriculture during the government of Lysius Salomon. During this administration, Légitime was accused of aspiring to the presidency, and moved to Kingston, Jamaica, for three years.

He returned to Haiti at the invitation of his followers, and on October 7, 1888, was elected president of the provisional government. General Seide Thelemaque denounced the election as fraudulent and attempted to make himself President, but he was killed in the battle which ensued. Légitime was elected President of Haiti on December 16, 1888, but resigned in 1889, owing to the opposition of General Florvil Hyppolite. He fled Haiti aboard the French cruiser Kerguélen in August 1889, initially traveling to New York City, where he took a passenger ship to France. He then retired to Jamaica. In 1896 President Tiresias Simon Sam granted a general amnesty, and Légitime returned to Haiti. He died on July 29, 1935 in Port-au-Prince.

He wrote La nation ou la race haïtienne (1888).

Political offices
Preceded by Pierre Théoma Boisrond-Canal	President of Haïti; 1888-1889	Succeeded by Monpoint Jeune
