= Florvil Hyppolite =

President of Haiti (1828–1896)

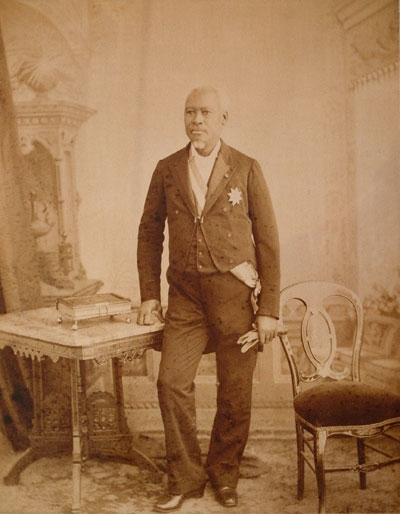

15th President of Haiti
- In office 17 October 1889 – 24 March 1896
- Preceded by: Monpoint Jeune (provisional)
- Succeeded by: Tirésias Simon Sam

Minister of Agriculture and Police
- In office 1 September 1888 – 5 October 1888
- President: Pierre Théoma Boisrond-Canal
- Preceded by: Morin Montasse
- Succeeded by: François Denys Légitime

Member of the Provisional Government of Haiti
- In office 24 August 1888 – 5 October 1888
- President: Pierre Théoma Boisrond-Canal

President of the Provisional Government of Haiti
- In office 3 October 1879 – 26 October 1879
- Preceded by: Joseph Lamothe
- Succeeded by: Lysius Salomon

Personal details
- Born: Louis Mondestin Florvil Hyppolite; 26 May 1828 Cap-Haïtien, Haiti
- Died: 24 March 1896 (aged 67) Port-au-Prince, Haiti
- Party: National Party

Louis Mondestin Florvil Hyppolite (French pronunciation: [lwi mɔ̃dɛstɛ̃ flɔʁvil ipɔlit]; 26 May 1828 – 24 March 1896) was a Haitian general and politician who served as the President of Haiti from 17 October 1889 to 24 March 1896.

He became President of Haiti following a struggle for succession in the aftermath of the overthrow of Lysius Salomon in 1888. His presidency was characterized by relative prosperity and a substantial public works program.

== Early life and career ==
Hyppolite was born in 1827 at Cap-Haïtien to a Haitian family of African descent. He was well educated and entered politics in the presidential campaign of Faustin Soulouque. During the revolution of 1865 he distinguished himself as a soldier. After the war he went back to local politics and did not figure in public life until the overthrow of President Lysius Salomon by General François Denys Légitime in 1888. He then was a leader under General Seïde Thélémaque in the northern part of the republic. In 1889 he headed a revolt against President Légitime.

== President of Haiti (1889–1896) ==
On 9 October 1889, Hyppolite was elected to a seven-year term as president of Haiti by the Constituent Assembly, which met at Gonaives. Hyppolite took the oath of office on the 17 October.

As soon as he assumed the presidency, he had to deal with the Môle Saint-Nicolas affair, a diplomatic incident in which the United States attempted to acquire Môle Saint-Nicolas through intimidation. The US dispatched a fleet to Port-au-Prince in a show of force, which provoked a protest throughout Haiti. President Hyppolite was forced to assume a firm anti-American stance particularly given that he was suspected of being in sympathy with the Americans. Anténor Firmin, then Haitian Secretary of State for Exterior Relations, refused to grant any territory to the Americans, citing the Constitution of Haiti, which forbade the alienation of any portion of the territory.

The Môle Saint-Nicolas affair once disposed of, Hyppolite's government had to come to an understanding with the French legation at Port-au-Prince concerning its recent practice of granting naturalizations on Haitian territory. Natives of Haiti who claimed to be of French descent would go to the legation and have themselves registered as French citizens. The Haitian Secretary of State of Foreign Relations undertook to put an end to this practice. After drawn-out negotiations, France at last yielded; it ordered its Minister at Port-au-Prince to cancel the names of all those who had not had the right to have them registered.

Former president François Denys Légitime, who had fled to Jamaica, instigated a number of uprisings against Hyppolite, which Hyppolite successfully repressed. To prevent future uprisings, he executed their leaders. It was his policy to exclude foreigners from the island as he claimed they stirred up insurrections.

Nonetheless, Hyppolite held friendly intercourse with all foreign powers. In 1892 the Vatican proved its good will toward the Republic of Haiti in accrediting a Delegate and Envoy Extraordinary to Port-au-Prince. Wanting to extend its commerce and make its products known abroad, Haiti took part in the Chicago Exposition, where it won many high prizes.

President Hyppolite devoted his earnest attention to the public works of the country. Wharves were built in several ports; large markets were erected in Port-au-Prince and Cap-Haitien. In several towns canals were constructed for the distribution of water to private houses. Telegraph lines connected the principal towns in the Republic at about the same time that the telephone was first introduced. The roads were kept in good repair; agriculture and commerce flourished. It now became possible for Haiti to redeem its internal debt, upon which it was paying interest at the rate of 18 per cent per annum; for this purpose a loan of 50,000,000 francs at 6 per cent per annum was floated in Paris in 1896. That was the last important act of Hyppolite's government.

== Death ==
By the time he was 67 years old, Hyppolite had not been in good health for some time. Nonetheless, he refused to rest as he had been advised to do. Against the advice of his doctor he decided to undertake a long journey to Jacmel to put down an uprising there. He started on 24 March 1896, at three o'clock in the morning, but before he even had time to leave Port-au-Prince he fell from his horse dead, in a "fit of apoplexy", at a short distance from the Executive Mansion. His funeral took place on the 26 March.

Because President Hyppolite's strong personality rather than his party kept his government in power, it was feared that his death would precipitate a revolution. However, the Council of Secretaries of State took charge of the affairs of the Government until the election of his successor. The new president, Tirésias Simon Sam, was elected to the vacancy on 1 April by the Senate and House of Representatives, and was installed without the feared revolution coming to pass.

Political offices
Preceded by Joseph Lamothe	President of the Provisional Government of Haiti; 1879	Succeeded by Lysius Salomon
Preceded by Morin Montasse	Minister of Agriculture and Police; 1888	Succeeded by François Denys Légitime
Preceded by Monpoint Jeune (Provisional)	President of Haiti; 1889–1896	Succeeded by Tirésias Simon Sam
