= Paul Arcelin =

Haitian Ambassador to the Dominican Republic

Haiti Ambassador to the Dominican Republic

Paul Arcelin is a Haitian who lived in Canada for many years in exile from the Duvalier dictatorship because of his political activities. He married a Canadian woman with whom he raised two children in Montréal.

In 1986, following Duvalier's departure, he was asked to be the Special Adviser to General William Regala and chief of staff of his cabinet. He was also the Haitian ambassador to the Dominican Republic during the Prosper Avril government.

Arcelin was also known for being particularly against Jean Bertrand-Aristide. Indeed, he played a key role in the 2004 Haitian rebellion with Guy Philippe. During the rebellion, he participated in some interviews that are available on Radio Canada.

Arcelin was a candidate for the office of president of Haiti. After the rebellion which led to the ouster of Aristide, Arcelin vowed to remain in Haiti to help restore the country.

== Education ==
Arcelin studied in Kingston, Jamaica, Caracas, Venezuela, and at Paris, France, where he presented his thesis: Integration Dominican Republic-Haiti at Sorbonne University. The thesis was praised by former Dominican president Juan Bosch. Arcelin also obtained a Master's degree in Administration at the University of Ottawa.

Arcelin went on to teach at Université du Québec à Montréal. He also taught at the following locations:

- Javeriana University, Bogotá, Colombia
- Marine Academy of War, Santo Domingo, Dominican Republic
- Taught history and French in a variety of schools in Quebec

== Activism ==
Together with Irving Davidson, he founded Haiti Recovery Inc., a non-governmental organization that has been recognized by the State Department in Washington D.C. Arcelin also co-founded OHUBARDO, Humanitarian Organization which works to assist Haitian workers in the “bateyes” (Sugar Cane Fields).

He has written for such well-known newspapers as El Nacional of Caracas, Venezuela, El Tiempo (Bogotá, Colombia) and US-based Haïti Observateur.

Paul Arcelin was a main independent candidate for the 2005 elections in Haiti for the Convergence Vers Reconstruction et L'industrialisation D'Haiti (CRIH) party, which he founded and coordinates. This is a coalition of different political parties, unions, community, associations, peasants movements, student groups, artists, professionals, church leaders, merchants, industrialists and a large segment of the Haitian diaspora.

== Bibliography ==
- Cercueil sous le bras
