= Windsor Noncent =

Haitian-French footballer (born 1984)

Personal information
- Full name: Windsor Noncent
- Date of birth: 12 June 1984 (age 42)
- Place of birth: Clichy-la-Garenne, France
- Position: Defender

Team information
- Current team: Don Bosco FC
- Number: 5

Youth career
- 1987–1994: Ecole Les Totems
- 1994–1997: Ecole Les Tilleuls
- 1997–2000: Collége Le Luzard
- 2000–2002: Sedan

Senior career*
Years	Team	Apps	(Gls)
2002–2004	Sedan B	13	(0)
2003–2004	Sedan	1	(1)
2005–2006	DJK TuS Hordel	11	(0)
2006	CSO Amnéville	4	(0)
2006–2007	Levallois SC	22	(0)
2007–2008	Vac-Ujbuda LTC	17	(0)
2008–	Don Bosco FC	77	(2)

International career
2007–2008	Haiti	8	(1)
- * Club domestic league appearances and goals

Windsor Noncent (born 12 June 1984) is a Haitian-French footballer, who currently plays for Don Bosco FC.

== Early life ==
Noncent attended 1987 at the Ecole Les Totems and joined 1994 in the Ecole Les Tilleuls. He learned between 1997 at the Ecole Les Tilleuls and joined in the same year in the Collége Le Luzard.

== Career ==
Noncent began his career by CS Sedan Ardennes and joined in summer 2005 to German club DJK TuS Hordel, who played a half year before sign for CSO Amnéville. After another six months left his club CSO Amnéville to sign for Levallois SC. He played in the 2006/2007 season 22 games for Levallois SC before signed in summer 2007 for Hungarian club Vác-Újbuda-Lágymányos TC from the 5. liga német.

== International career ==
He made his debut for Haiti in on 17 April 2007 friendly match against El Salvador, in which he immediately scored a goal. He was a squad member at the 2007 Gold Cup Finals. In February 2008, he played in the friendly series against Venezuela, which served as a warm-up for the 2010 FIFA World Cup qualification match against Nicaragua or the Netherlands Antilles.

== Personal life ==
Windsor's twin brother Ralph Noncent played currently for French club Drancy Jeanne d'Arc.
