= Ida Faubert =

Haitian writer (1882–1969)

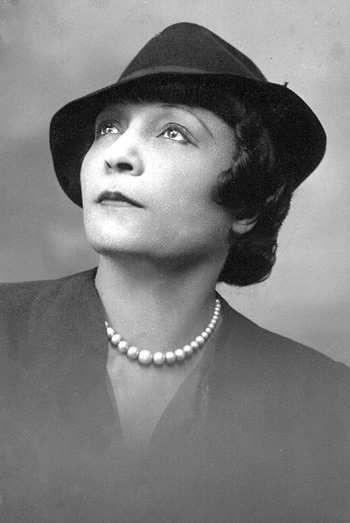
- Born: 14 February 1882; Port-au-Prince, Haiti
- Died: July 23, 1969 (aged 86–87); Joinville-le-Pont, Ile-de-France, France
- Occupation: Writer
- Parent(s): Lysius Salomon and Florentine Potiez

Ida Faubert (14 February 1882 – 23 July 1969) (Christian first name Gertrude Florentine Félicitée Ida) was a Haitian writer. She was a complex literary figure: bicultural, biracial, and privileged, she neither fitted easily into socially-prescribed categories for women of color in France or Haiti nor conformed to them. As a deft writer and socialite in both Port-au-Prince and Paris, she promoted and participated in the movements of Haitian writers and literature in Haiti and France.

== Biography ==
Ida Faubert was born on 14 February 1882, in Port-au-Prince, Haiti. She was the daughter of Haitian president Lysius Salomon and a French mother, Florentine Potiez. When Faubert was six years old, political events forced her father out of office and her family to expatriate to France. Her father's death followed that year. Ida Faubert, placed in the care of her mother's family, was sent to a convent boarding school like many elite girls of her time. She grew up in France’s Belle Époque, a period of flourishing arts in a stable Europe, and as a young woman entered Paris's artistic and cultural circles. An early romance met her family's disapproval for racial reasons. She went on to marry and quickly divorce Léonce Laraque. The couple had a daughter, Jacqueline, who died as an infant and to whom Faubert would dedicate elegiac poems.

In 1903, while in her early 20s, Faubert returned to Haiti, where she made an impression on members of Port-au-Prince’s cultural elite and privileged classes with her charm, verse, and lineage. The country’s elite class produced, through resources, venues, and social connections, the published writers of her day, and Faubert was well situated as an emerging poet in Haiti. Literary scholar Omise'eke Natasha Tinsley (2010) notes that for Haitian women writers then, there existed two distinct channels of circulation of texts: newly founded women’s literary circles, with their own literary reviews, and the male-dominated literary journals and movement La Géneration de la Ronde. Named after the journal La Ronde, this influential movement, of which Faubert was a part, flourished between 1898 and the 1920s. Literary scholars Raphaël Berrou and Pradel Pompilus (1975) note that its poets pursued and articulated the need for a universal lyric, one that would place Haitian literature in the perceived larger stream of Francophone, particularly French, letters. The movement's novelists and dramaturgs, they add, addressed in their work customs and concerns closer to home. Prominent poetic themes evident in the work of both men and women included love, melancholy, death, and religious and spiritual concerns.

Faubert's carefully wrought poems contained these leitmotifs, as well as a subtle style, and began to appear in Haitian journals in 1912. It is possible that she published earlier poems under a pen name, adopting a strategy not unusual for Haitian women writers of the time. Faubert was among the rare Haitian women writers whose work appeared under her own name in Haiti. Her male Géneration de la Ronde contemporaries included poets Etzer Vilaire, Georges Sylvain, Louis Borno, Seymour Pradel, Charles Moravia, and Léon Laleau.

Despite personal attainments and early literary success as she moved between Haiti and France in her 20s—in 1906 she had given birth to son Raoul and married his father André Faubert in Paris—she found the mores and strictures of Port-au-Prince’s high society stifling, according to biographer Madeleine Gardiner (1984). Her permanent return to France in 1914 occurred before the outbreak of World War I in Europe and a year prior to the 19-year US military occupation of Haiti that would shake deeply Haitian society and engender a profound anti-US, anticolonial reaction in many Haitian citizens and writers. The seeds of Haiti's indigenist movement, a nationalist affirmation that would place Haitian folklore, the Haitian countryside, and the Haitian peasant at the heart of Haitian literature and visual arts, found fertile ground in the American occupation. Haitian indigenism would inform, draw from, and overlap with the Harlem Renaissance and the Négritude movement launched in France. Jean Price-Mars, who articulated the concept of "indigenism", and Faubert would share a long friendship. Her short stories, published much later, would focus on Haiti and exhibit some indigenist values.

In 1914, Faubert separated from her husband and settled with her son in Paris. During the war she served as a volunteer in Parisian hospitals and tended to wounded soldiers returning from France's military frontlines. As a woman of letters she attended lectures and literary events; opened her own salon to receive artists and intellectuals; and frequented feminist and lesbian writers, many also situated in Paris’s bohemian Left Bank. Her circle of friends included Anna de Noailles, an influence for Faubert and prominent literary figure in pre-World War I France, and the prolific and popular novelist Colette. Underscoring Faubert's friends and acquaintances, Madeleine Gardiner suggests Faubert may have engaged in amorous relationships with women, particularly in the liberated climate of Europe's postwar années folles. Also known as the Roaring Twenties, this period was marked by sustained economic growth in major European and American cities, artistic and cultural dynamism, and growing female emancipation, especially for elite and white women. Natasha Tinsley (2010) reads a number of Faubert's poems as celebrations of women's sensuality, addressed to a lover or lovers whose gender is not specified, as well as astute negotiations of race and gender, with Faubert refusing the popular tropes assigned to women of color in the contemporary white European imagination.

In 1939, Faubert published her first book, a volume of poems titled Cœur des Îles. It consists of three parts. Poems of the first two sections vary in subject matter, with love, sensuous descriptions of nature, and apprehension and loss figuring prominently. A third section is dedicated to Faubert's lost daughter. Some poems are evocative and appeal to and overlay the separate senses in their expression, employing a symbolist poetics. In general, they lean toward an earlier European Romantic-era aesthetic, privileging strong emotion, as well as display Faubert's great attention to technique and form, an approach more closely associated with French poetry’s Parnassian movement. The poems are written in French rhymed verse and a formal style, with employment and mastery of fixed poetic forms such as sonnets, chansons, and rondels, which supports their deep lyricism.

In 1939, the year of the book's publication, Cœur des Îles was awarded the French Prix Jacques Normand de la Société des Gens de Lettres. The first version of Aimé Césaire's influential poetic text Cahier d'un retour au pays natal was published in the French journal Volonté as Germany's invasion of Poland signaled the onset of World War II. Faubert's son enlisted in the French military at the start of the war. With her daughter-in-law and grandson, Jean, safe in Sarthe, Faubert remained in Paris through the German occupation of 1940 to 1944. She continued to write poems and the short stories that would become the book Sous le soleil caraïbe, histoires d'Haïti et d'ailleurs.

In the decades following World War II, Faubert maintained contact with writers, friends, and colleagues in Haiti, welcoming Jean Price Mars, Léon Laleau, and poet and novelist Marie-Thérèse Colimon Hall, among many others, when they visited France. She quietly supported causes on behalf of the homeless and those wounded in the war. She was a devoted mother and grandmother, according to grandson Jean Faubert. Faubert's second book, Sous le soleil caraïbe, was published in 1959. Unlike her poems, which were situated in ambiguous geography, these stories are set in a fictionalized Haiti, one that contains names of towns and lieus similar to those of actual Haitian sites. The stories take place in varied time periods and are peopled with Haitian and foreign characters negotiating Haitian life in its multiplicity and clash of perspectives, cultures, race, class, and politics. Faubert illustrates human foibles, farces, and desires. The stories are marked by a clear, unadorned French prose and occasional use of Creole terms and expressions. They range in tone from humorous to chilling, with several treating the phenomenon of zombies and revenants. A number of Faubert's short stories, like her poems, exhibit a gothic quality.

Faubert died on 23 July 1969 in Joinville-le-Pont, Ile-de-France, France. She is considered one of Haiti's great women poets.

== Bibliography ==
- 1939: Cœur des Îles, preface by Jean Vignaud, edited by René Debresse, prix Jacques Normand 1939
- 1959: Histoires d'Haïti et d'ailleurs, "Sous le ciel Caraïbe" preface by Pierre Dominique
- 2005: Œuvres, edited by Mémoire d'encrier
