= Léon Thébaud =

Léon Robert Thébaud, a lawyer and ambassador, was born in Gonaïves, Haïti, on 5 June 1894 and died in Paris, France. He worked early on with his father in the import trade of building materials. Léon was appointed consul general in Marseille, France, on 13 October 1927. From 1932 to 1937 he was a counsellor at the legation in Paris, minister plenipotentiary in Paris and inspector of consulates of Haiti in Europe from 1937 to 1941. After four years there, Thébaud was transferred in 1941 to Rome, where he represented Haiti as an envoy extraordinary to the Vatican.

The occupation of Rome by the German armed forces in September 1943 forced him to step down from this post. He returned to Rome in 1947, and in 1954 once again became Haiti's minister plenipotentiary in France.^{1}

== Évian Conference ==
Léon Robert Thébaud attended the Évian Conference from 6 to 13 July 1938 in Évian-les-Bains, France, to discuss the issue of Jewish refugees escaping Nazi persecution. He attended representing the island nation of Haiti as the commercial attaché in Paris, with the rank of minister.

== Haitian history ==
As Haitian ambassador to France, Léon Thébaud put up a stone cross memorial for Toussaint Louverture on 29 August 1954 at Fort-de-Joux.
