= Rochel Chery =

French professional basketball player

Personal information
- Born: 27 November 1982 (age 42); Clichy-la-Garenne, France
- Listed height: 194 cm (6 ft 4 in)

Career information
- Playing career: 2002–2014
- Position: Shooting guard; Small forward
- Number: 7

Rochel Chery (born 27 November 1982) is a French professional basketball player who played for French LNB Pro A club Le Havre during the 2002–2004 seasons.

== Biography ==
Chery was born in Clichy-la-Garenne and is of Haitian descent.
