= Jean-Baptiste Dureau de la Malle =

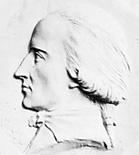
- Born: 27 July 1742; Ouanaminthe, Saint-Domingue (now Haiti)
- Died: 19 September 1807 (aged 64); Mauves-sur-Huisne, France
- Resting place: Mauves-sur-Huisne
- Occupations: Writer, translator

Jean-Baptiste Dureau de la Malle (27 November 1742, Ouanaminthe, Saint-Domingue – 19 September 1807 Mauves-sur-Huisne) was a French writer of French literature and translator. He was made a member of the "Corps législatif" in 1802 and was admitted into the Académie française in 1804.

== Biography ==
Jean-Bapiste was the son of Laurent Dureau de la Malle and Elisabeth Sauvage. He went to study in Paris and, freed from earning a living by his large fortune, devoted himself entirely to letters and made it his mission to meet the most distinguished French writers of the day. He was made a member of the "Corps législatif" in 1802 and of the Académie française in 1804. He married Elisabeth-Renée Maignon, who had also been born in Saint-Domingue, and their son was Adolphe Dureau de la Malle.

== Works ==
His first work, a translation of the De Beneficiis of Seneca the Younger, came in 1776. He followed it in 1793 with a translation of Tacitus – this made his reputation, was reprinted in 1808, 1816 and later, and was said by the Dictionnaire Bouillet to be the best translation of the works right up until the publication of that by Jean Louis Burnouf.

Dureau de la Malle's translation of Sallust appeared in 1808. His translation of Livy was incomplete on his death and was completed by his son and by François Noël and published posthumously in 15 volumes from 1810 to 1815.
