= Jean-Dimmy Jéoboam =

Haitian footballer (born 1986)

Personal information
- Date of birth: 23 September 1986 (age 40)
- Place of birth: Léogâne, Haiti
- Height: 1.80 m (5 ft 11 in)
- Position: Forward

Senior career*
Years	Team	Apps	(Gls)
2004–2006	Laval		
2006–2007	Paris	3	(0)
2008–2009	La Vitréenne	11	(0)
2009–2010	Fribourg		
2010–2011	Louhans-Cuiseaux	25	(0)
2012–2013	Aubervilliers		
- * Club domestic league appearances and goals

Jean-Dimmy Jéoboam (born 23 September 1986) is a Haitian former professional footballer who played as a forward. Following a short stint with Stade Lavallois in Ligue 2 he spent most of his career in the lower leagues of France.

== Career ==
In April 2009, Jéoboam played for the reserves of La Vitréenne in the French sixth tier.

In 2011, he played for CS Louhans-Cuiseaux in the fourth tier.

In July 2012, he joined FCM Aubervilliers, also in the fourth tier.

== Post-playing career ==
Following his retirement as a player, Jéoboam gained a UEFA B coaching licence and became a coach. He coached the under-20 side Racing Club de France Football.
