= Jean-Baptiste Romane =

Haitian poet and playwright

Jean-Baptiste Romane (1807 - 1858) was an early Haitian poet and playwright.

Romane is best known for his first work, the lyrical poem Hymne à l'Indépendance (Hymn to Independence). When France announced its official recognition of Haitian independence, Romane's poem was sung at the subsequent national celebration. His works were typically historic or patriotic; many celebrated the heroes of the Haitian Revolution. For one poem, Vers à la France, Romane was awarded a gold medallion by the French government.

== Selected works ==
=== Poems ===
- A l'Artibonite
- A l'Ozama
- Hymne à l'Indépendance (1825)
- Sur la Ville de Saint-Domingue

=== Plays ===
- La Mort de Christophe
