= Lysius Salomon =

13th President of Haiti from 1879 to 1888

Louis Etienne Lysius Salomon
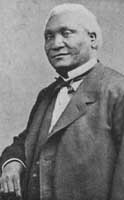

13th President of Haiti
- In office October 26, 1879 – August 10, 1888
- Preceded by: Pierre Théoma Boisrond-Canal
- Succeeded by: François Denys Légitime

Member of the Provisional Government of the Republic of Haiti
- In office October 3, 1879 – October 26, 1879

Minister of Finance, Commerce and Foreign Relations
- In office October 3, 1879 – November 19, 1879
- Preceded by: Joseph Lamothe
- Succeeded by: Charles Laforesterie

Minister of Finance, Commerce, Foreign Relations, Justice, Education and Worship
- In office February 14, 1851 – January 15, 1859
- President: Faustin I
- Preceded by: Himself (Finance, Commerce and Foreign Relations); Jean-Baptiste Francisque (Justice, Education and Worship)
- Succeeded by: Victorin Plésance (Finance and Commerce); André Jean-Simon (Foreign Relations and Education); Jean-François Acloque (Justice and Worship)

Minister of Finance, Commerce and Foreign Relations
- In office April 9, 1848 – February 14, 1851
- President: Faustin Soulouque (as president); Faustin I (as Emperor)
- Preceded by: Alexis Dupuy
- Succeeded by: Himself (Finance and Commerce); Louis Dufresne (Foreign Relations)

Personal details
- Born: June 30, 1815 Les Cayes, Haiti
- Died: October 19, 1888 (aged 73) Paris, France
- Party: National Party
- Spouse(s): 1) Thulcide Jean-Louis Nicolas; 2) Florentine Félicité Potiez
- Children: Ida Salomon Faubert

Louis Étienne Félicité Lysius Salomon (June 30, 1815 – October 19, 1888) was the president of Haiti from 1879 to 1888.

Salomon is best remembered for instituting Haiti's first postal system and for his lively enthusiasm for Haiti's modernization. His government founded the National Bank of Haiti. His government implemented a land reform that distributed state land to farmers and enabled foreigners to own land in Haiti.

His presidency was characterized by political instability and rebellions. Amid threats of being overthrown, he left Haiti for Paris in August 1888. He died in October 1888.

He was noted for being 6′6″ tall, and referred to having "physical proportions of a gladiator". His daughter Ida Faubert was a French poet.

== Early life ==
Salomon was born in 1815 in Les Cayes. His family was influential in the tiny black elite of the south. Prominent and educated, his family often clashed with the relatively more powerful mulatto elite of south Haiti. The Salomon family played an early role in the unrest that ultimately led to the overthrow of President Charles Rivière-Hérard, leading a brief uprising that was a precursor to the larger and more successful Piquet revolt. It was triggered by a disputed electoral assembly in the run-up to the adoption of the 1843 constitution. Salomon said that the local mulatto elites refused to accept that blacks had equal rights in the assemblies, that they "were revolted to see men with black skins.. come to vote concurrently with them." The Salomons raised a force of 800 rebels from local cultivators, but the rebellion was put down and the family went into exile in Jamaica.

As Faustin Soulouque came into power, Salomon returned along with other powerful black leaders to serve the new government. Salomon became the Minister of Finance under Faustin and began to monopolize export transactions in coffee and cotton, run foreign imports through state monopolies, and impose levies on capital. As a result, smuggling and piracy exploded during Soulouque's reign. After the fall of Soulouque, Salomon was exiled to Paris and London, where he read and traveled widely.

== Becoming president ==
On August 18, 1879, Salomon returned to Haiti and became president with huge support from the people. His rise to power was anticipated by General Richelieu Duperval, who carried out a coup d'état on the night of October 2–3 that deposed the provisional government of Lamothe-Hérissé. After the coup, another provisional government was installed, presided over by Florvil Hyppolite and composed of General Duperval, Seide Thélémaque, Tirésias Simon Sam and also Salomon, who was appointed as minister of finance and foreign affairs. On October 23, the National Assembly elected Salomon for a seven-year term. His presidential inauguration took place 3 days later, on October 26. His plan as president was to restart public education, fix Haiti's financial woes, restore agriculture productivity, improve the army, and to fix the public administration. Within four months, he established the National Bank of Haiti, and by 1880 he resumed debt payments to France. The 1880s saw a huge amount of effort by the Salomon administration to bring modernization to Haiti. He adhered to the International Postal Union and issued its first postage stamp. In October, he granted a British cable company the right to connect Port-au-Prince and Kingston, Jamaica, and by 1887 he negotiated to link Môle-Saint-Nicolas to Cuba. He restructured the medical school, imported teachers from France for the Lycées, and more. The Armed Forces of Haiti were reorganized to 16,000 and assigned to 34 infantry regiments and 4 artillery regiments. Salomon also reorganized the ranking distribution in the army, which only included privates and generals.

== Diplomatic relations ==
In May 1883, Salomon offered the United States the island of Tortuga in return for U.S. protection. In November, Salomon offered Môle Saint-Nicolas or Tortuga to the United States, but both offers were rejected.

== Conspiracies and rebellion ==
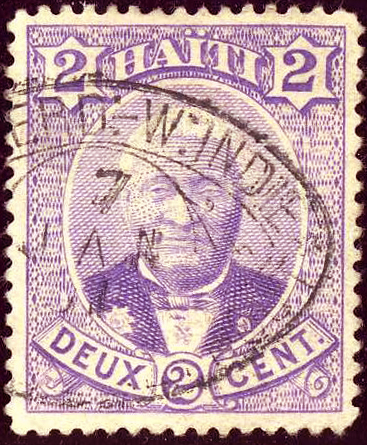
Salomon on an 1887 stamp

Within four months of Salomon's presidency, Haitian refugees from Kingston were in contact with the elite community in Port-au-Prince in order to stage a coup. When Salomon went to tour the south, general Nicolas headed to St. Marc to plan another coup, but was met with government soldiers. In 1883, exiled Haitian rebels from Jamaica and Cuba, including Jean-Pierre Boyer-Bazelais and Desormes, reached Haitian shores to start another coup against Salomon.

While Salomon fixed some of Haiti's problems, he also drained resources to pay Haiti's debt to France. During 1881–1882, an outbreak of smallpox spread throughout the country and consumed most of the finances in those years. In April 1883, the infamous Cacos from the north rebelled against Salomon and his administration, but were crushed by government troops mixed with former piquets.

From 1884 to the end of his presidency, Salomon faced numerous rebellions from the Cacos. By May, Cacos from the south rebelled in Jérémie, and in July Jacmel rebelled. In October, a huge outburst emerged between Salomon's government forces, the exiled rebels from Cuba and Jamaica, and Cacos from different cities from the south and north. Flames engulfed government records and buildings, and mass murder was being dealt to the elite class, foreigners, and merchants. This conflict was known as the "Bloody Week".

Following the rebellion, inflation grew, and a scandal called the "Affaire des Mandats" became known involving the national bank, a French director, a British chief accountant and the Haitian government.

== Resignation and death ==
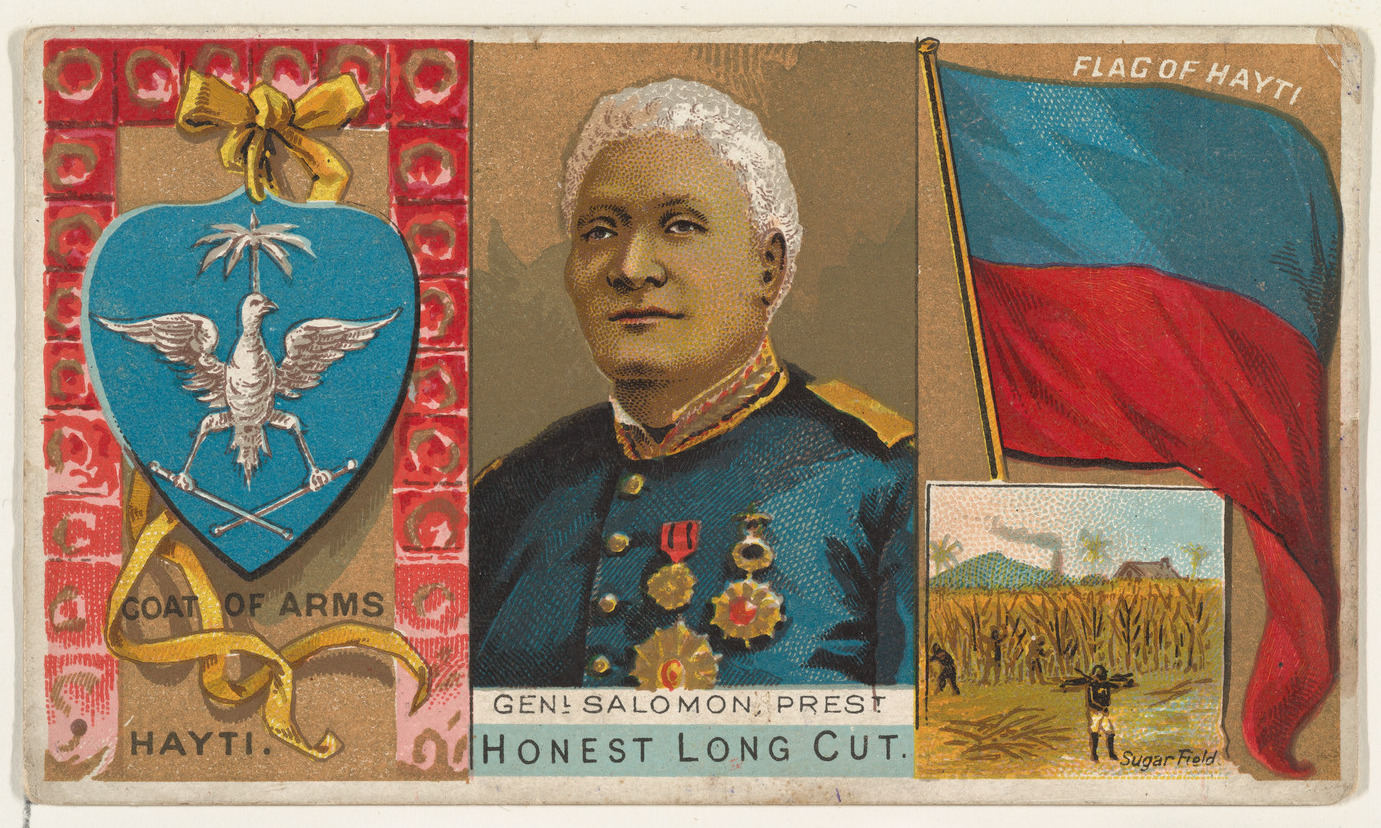
Salomon on a cigarette card of 1888, with Haitian national symbols

In 1886, Salomon was "re-elected" for a seven-year term because of his re-writing of the constitution. In 1887, Port-au-Prince rebelled because of lack of individual freedom and the tyrannical system of the republic. Government officials withdrew support from Salomon and by 1888 Le Cap rebelled in the north. Overwhelmed by the political challenges he faced, Salomon left Haiti and returned to Paris, where he died at number 3 Avenue Victor-Hugo on October 19, 1888.

== See also ==
- Haiti

Political offices
Preceded by Pierre Théoma Boisrond-Canal	President of Haiti; 1879–1888	Succeeded by François Denys Légitime
