= Victoria Montou =

Dahomey Amazon and Haitian revolutionary (1739–1805)

Abdaraya Toya

Personal details
- Born: c. 1739 Kingdom of Dahomey
- Died: 12 June 1805 Port-au-Prince, Empire of Haiti

Abdaraya Toya "Victoria Montou" (c. 1739 – 12 June 1805) was a Dahomey warrior and freedom fighter in the army of Jean-Jacques Dessalines during the Haitian Revolution. Before the Revolution she and Dessalines had been enslaved on the same estate, and the two remained close throughout her life, with Dessalines calling her his aunt.

== Early life ==
Toya is believed to have been born in the Kingdom of Dahomey, in present-day Benin. Some sources indicate that she was a soldier there. It is unclear precisely when she was abducted and enslaved, or when she arrived in Haiti but she was enslaved in Saint-Domingue on settler Henri Duclos's coffee plantation.

Before the revolution, Toya worked alongside Dessalines as enslaved person on the estate of Henry Duclos. She was described as intelligent and energetic, and shared a close relationship with Dessalines and the same hatred against slavery. Dessalines called her his aunt, which may have reflected their closeness as expressed within the traditions of African diasporic kinship, rather than a direct biological link.

Toya introduced Jean-Jacques to hand-to-hand combat and knife throwing. Plantation owner Duclos was wary of their closeness, and decided to transfer Victoria Montou to the Déluger dwelling, selling Jean-Jacques to a black freedman named Dessalines.

Toya was reportedly a skilled warrior, midwife and healer, who organised several rebellions before the momentous meeting at Bois Caiman in 1791.

== The Haitian Revolution ==
During the slave rebellion and civil war, she fought as a soldier in active service; on at least one documented occasion, she commanded soldiers in action during battle. Jean-Baptiste Mirambeau wrote of her in Le Document, no. 2 , the February 1940 issue:

At the head of about fifty slaves, there was Toya, with a scythe in her hand, a hoe on one shoulder and an indigo knife hanging from the belt of her jacket. Under Toya's command, one group was sent to deforestation, another to plowing, others to harvest grain and put it in large baskets. She had a strong voice, and she issued commands like a general.... A small number of rebels, under the command of Toya, was quickly surrounded and taken prisoner by the regiment. During the battle, Toya escaped, pursued by two soldiers. A struggle took place between them and Toya; she injured one of them seriously, but the other, helped by a few more soldiers who arrived in time, took Toya prisoner.

== Post-Revolution ==
In 1804 Dessalines became Emperor of Haiti, and he gave Toya the title of Imperial Duchess.

When Toya was dying, the emperor urged his doctor to save her life, stating that she was his aunt who had shared his sufferings and emotions since before the revolution. She was given a state funeral with a procession of eight sergeants; Empress Marie-Claire Heureuse Felicite dressed in black between two non-commissioned officers led the convoy.

== Legacy ==
The names of few women soldiers who served in the Haitian army during the revolution have been remembered. Toya is amongst the very few exceptions, alongside Marie-Jeanne Lamartinière and Sanité Belair.

Toya is remembered for her role in raising and teaching Dessalines. Kersuze Simeon-Jones writes that "For her lasting influence on Dessalines, Abdaraya Toya shall be remembered as the grandmother, mother, and aunt-figure who helped prepare the Liberator of African descendants enslaved throughout the Americas".

In 2023, she was one of the figures featured at the Panthéon, in Paris, in a double art and history exhibition highlighting little-known personalities who contributed to the abolition of the slave system.
