= Bayyinah Bello =

Haitian historian (born 1948)

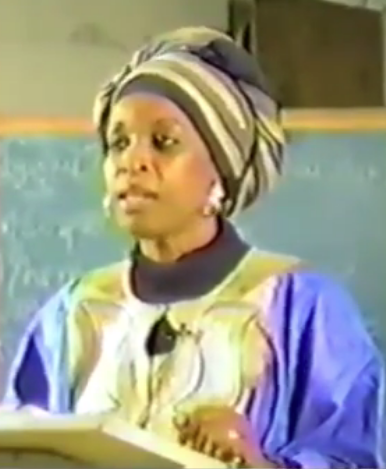
- Born: 1948 (age 77–78); Port-au-Prince, Haiti
- Occupations: Historian, writer, teacher and humanitarian worker
- Known for: Founder of Fondasyon Félicité (FF)

Bayyinah Bello (born 1948) is a historian with expertise in Haitian and Pan-African history. She is also well known for being a teacher, writer and humanitarian worker, who in her earlier career spent 15 years living and travelling in West Africa, including four years in Nigeria, as well as in Benin, Togo, and other countries in the region.

Now based in Port-au-Prince, Haiti, Bello is the founder of an organization for historical research called Fondation Marie-Claire Heureuse Félicité Bonheur Dessalines, popularly known as Fondasyon Félicité (FF), named after Marie-Claire Heureuse Félicité Bonheur Dessalines the Empress consort of Haiti and wife of revolutionary leader of Haiti Jean-Jacques Dessalines. In the aftermath of the 2010 Haiti earthquake, the non-profit organization Friends of Fondation Félicité was set up to directly support FF, focusing on rebuilding the country. She is also a professor of history at the State University of Haiti.

== Biography ==
Bayyinah Bello was born in Port-au-Prince, Haiti. After completing her primary education in Haiti, she went at the age of 12 to join her father in Liberia. She subsequently studied in France and in the US, returning to the African continent to study in Nigeria, where she earned a master's degree in linguistics, among other qualifications. In 1969 she went back to the US, where she worked as a publicist and in the evenings taught French, and after the birth of her first child, Hashim, in 1970 she wrote her first story for children. She went on to have three other children, two more sons – Siddiq, and test-prep expert Akil – and her daughter Ameerah Bello. Returning to Haiti, Bayyinah Bello taught at the university and also founded a bilingual school, Citadel International School. She subsequently taught English and Arabic in Togo.

In 1999, she decided to start an organization dedicated to humanitarian, social and educational work to aid the people of Haiti. It was named Fondation Marie-Claire Heureuse Félicité Bonheur Dessalines, usually shortened to Fondation Félicité (FF), in honour of the wife of Jean-Jacques Dessalines, who was a slave first, learned to read and write, then began to teach, working for the liberation of the country, and ultimately lived to be 100 years. Soon after the 2010 Haiti earthquake, the Friends of Fondation Félicité was set up, an associated not-for-profit organization that is helping Haitian people to rebuild their own country, and raises funds for grassroots projects on the island.

In April 2014, Professor Bello was one of 10 honorees at the Gala des Femmes en Flammes that celebrated Haitian women "whose lives and professional work have paved the way for a better Haiti". As a leading historian, she regularly lectures and participates in international conferences, speaking on Haitian topics, including a keynote speech in Brooklyn, New York, at the Stanley Eugene Clark Elementary School for a Women's History Month celebration in March 2015.

She is the author of Jean-Jacques Dessalines: 21 PWENKONNEN SOU LAVI LI, published in 2020.
