= Ti Memenne of La Gonâve =

Haitian tribal queen

Ti Memenne
- Queen Ti Memenne in the 1920s

Queen of La Gonâve
- Reign: 27 January 1912 - 6 May 1934
- Predecessor: Célita Soulouque
- Successor: Julie
- Co-monarch: Faustin II (1926–1929)
- Born: 30 June 1868; La Gonâve, Haiti
- Died: 6 May 1934 (aged 65); La Gonâve, Haiti
- Religion: Haitian Vodou

Queen Ti Memenne of La Gonâve (also written as Timemenne; 30 June 1868 – 6 May 1934) was the tribal ruler of La Gonâve, a Haitian island located west of Hispaniola in the Gulf of Gonâve, between 27 January 1912 until her death in 6 May 1934. While her reign was not officially recognized by the republican government of Haiti during American occupation, she maintained political, economic, spiritual, and social leadership of the island.

Arrested by the Garde d'Haïti for being a practitioner of Vodou, she was shown compassion by Faustin E. Wirkus, an American military officer who assisted in her release. She later proclaimed Wirkus to be the reincarnation of former Haitian Emperor Faustin Soulouque and crowned him as a co-ruler over La Gonâve.

== Biography ==
Ti Memenne was a leading figure over a group of matriarchal societies, dominating social and economic affairs on La Gonâve. Her reign over La Gonâve was not officially recognized by the republican government, which had abolished the monarchy and nobility in Haiti. Despite this, she was viewed by the other native people of the island as their political and spiritual leader.

As a young woman, Ti Memenne was captured by American military officials during the United States occupation of Haiti and charged with "trivial voodoo offenses." She received aid from Faustin E. Wirkus, an American sergeant serving in the Garde d'Haiti who had been stationed on La Gonâve. Wirkus sent her to Port-au-Prince with a recommendation for lenient treatment. For the next year Ti Memenne built a friendship with Wirkus, who advised her on governmental and civil matters.

Due to his help, and because he shared a name with the former Haitian emperor Faustin I, she and her people proclaimed Wirkus to be Faustin II in a Vodou ritual, allowing him to co-rule over La Gonâve with her for three years (1926–1929). She reportedly believed Wirkus to be Faustin I's reincarnation.

Queen Ti Memenne died in 6 May 1934, about 5 years after Wirkus’s departure in 1929, and the Haitian administration was attempting to reform the island and integrate it into the rest of Haiti. Nevertheless, one of her advisors, her cousin Queen Julie, succeeded her as head of the community.

== In popular culture ==
Ti Memenne is remembered in William Seabrook's 1929 novel The Magic Island and Wirkus' memoir The White King of La Gonave: The True Story of the Sergeant of Marines Who Was Crowned King on a Voodoo Island.
