= Adélina Lévêque =

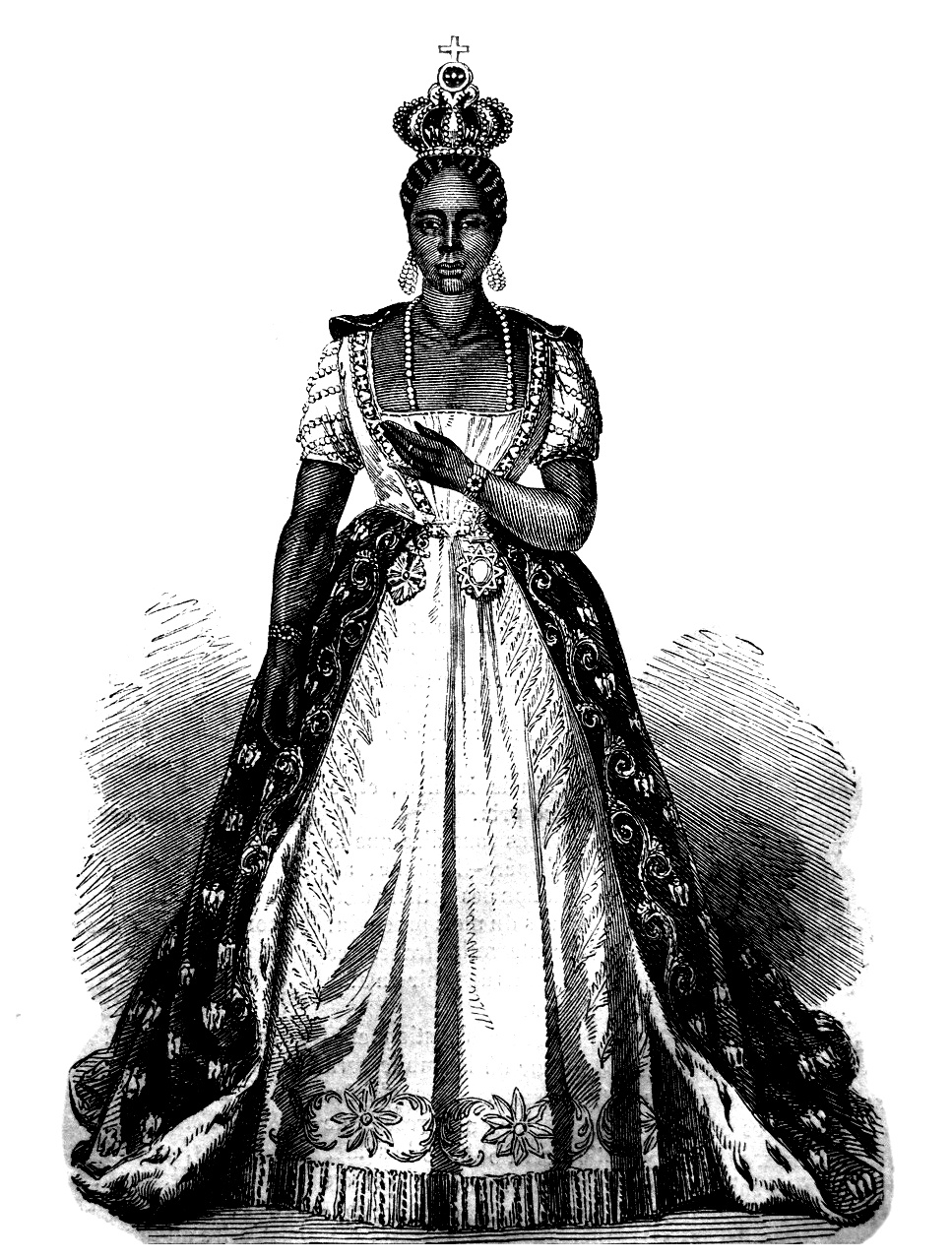

Empress consort of Haiti
- Tenure: 25 August 1849 – 15 January 1859
- Coronation: 18 April 1852
- Born: 26 July 1820; Manegue, Arcahaie, Haiti
- Died: 12 October 1878 (aged 58); Port-au-Prince, Haiti
- Spouse: Faustin I (m. 1847; died 1867)
- Issue: Olive Soulouque; Célita Soulouque
- House: Soulouque
- Father: Pierre Michel Lévêque
- Mother: Anne Augustin

Élisabeth Adélina Dérival Lévêque or Adélina Soulouque (née Elisabeth Anne Justine Lévêque; 26 July 1820 – 12 October 1878) was Empress of Haiti from 1849 until 1859, as wife of Emperor Faustin I of Haiti.

== Life ==
Adélina was the daughter of Pierre Michel Lévêque and Anne Augustin. She had a long-term relationship with Faustin Souloque for many years. On 31 December 1847 Adélina married her several years long-time companion, then-President Faustin Soulouque.

On 26 August 1849, when her husband proclaimed himself Emperor Faustin I, she was given the title Empress of Haiti with the style of Her Imperial Majesty. She was crowned with her husband at the capital Port-au-Prince on 18 April 1852: both emperor and empress were crowned in an immense and lavish ceremony that emulated the coronation of Napoleon. Her sister was styled Her Serene Highness Princess Célita.

As Empress, Adelina was given her own court, composed of a grand aumônier (grand almoner), two dames d'honneur (ladies of honor), two tirewomen, 56 dames du palais (ladies of the palace), 22 dames de la chapelle (ladies of the chapel), chamberlains and pages: all of them from the newly appointed nobility of Faustin and had the titles duchess, countess, baroness or marchioness. She performed representational duties, such as receiving in state, or giving audiences, every Tuesday.

In 1858 a revolution began, led by General Fabre Geffrard, Duc de Tabara. In December of that year, Geffrard defeated the Imperial Army and seized control of most of the country. As a result, the emperor abdicated his throne on 15 January 1859. Refused aid by the French Legation, Faustin was taken into exile aboard a British warship on 22 January 1859. Soon afterwards, the emperor and his family arrived in Kingston, Jamaica, where they remained for several years.

Allowed to return to Haïti, Faustin died at Petit-Goâve on 6 August 1867 and was buried at Fort Soulouque. Adélina herself was given the protection of the governments of Nissage Saget as well as Sylvain Salnave, and died in Port-au-Prince.

== Issue ==
1. Princess Geneviève Olive (known as "Madame Première") (29 November 1842 – 23 July 1883). Legitimated on the marriage of her parents, raised to the title of Princess and granted the style of Her Serene Highness in 1849. She married her cousin, Mainville-Joseph Soulouque.
2. Princess Célestine Marie Françoise (1848 – aft. 27 January 1912), named Célita, raised to the title of Princess and granted the style of Her Serene Highness in 1849. She married Jean Philippe Lubin, Count of Pétion-Ville.

== See also ==
- Marie-Claire Heureuse Félicité
- Marie Louise Christophe
