= Mainville-Joseph Soulouque =

Haitian prince

Prince Mainville-Joseph
- Duke of Fort-Royal
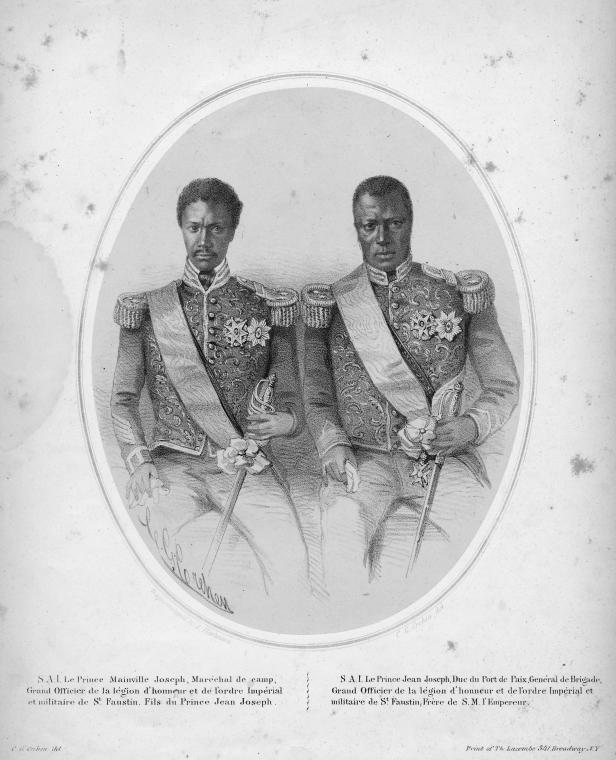
- Illustration of Prince Mainville-Joseph (left) and Prince Jean-Joseph
- Born: 21 August 1830; Anse-à-Veau, Haiti
- Died: 7 January 1875 (aged 44); Port-au-Prince, Haiti
- Spouse: Isabelle-Charlotte Salnave
- Issue: Princess Marie-Adélina; Prince Jean-Jacques Faustin; Princess Marie-Françoise
- House: Soulouque
- Father: Prince Jean-Joseph Soulouque, Duke of Port-de-Paix
- Mother: Princess Célestine Dessalines
- Occupation: soldier

Prince Mainville-Joseph Soulouque, Duke of Fort-Royal (21 August 1830 – 7 January 1875) was a Haitian prince and soldier, and nephew of Emperor Faustin I. He was prince of the blood under the Second Empire and marshal of the imperial army.

== Biography ==
Mainville-Joseph Soulouque is the son of Prince Jean-Joseph Soulouque, Duke of Port-de-Paix, and the eldest child of his father's second marriage to Princess Célestine Dessalines, daughter of Emperor Jacques I. His father was the brother of Emperor Faustin I.

In 1849, when his uncle became Emperor of Haiti, he obtained the title of Duke of Fort-Royal and Prince of the Blood, as the sovereign's first nephew. As Faustin had just lost his one and only son, he then thought of adopting his nephew, Mainville, and making him his new heir. Finally, he modified the rules of succession, to allow his eldest daughter, Princess Olive, to succeed him.

As a prince of the blood, Mainville received the title of imperial highness on August 26, 1849, the date of the proclamation of the Second Empire and his uncle's accession to the throne.

On August 3, 1853, he married one of his cousins, Isabelle-Charlotte Salnave (1833–1890), sister of the future President Sylvain Salnave, with whom he had three children:

- Marie-Adélina Soulouque (1855–1872) without posterity,
- Jean-Jacques Faustin Soulouque (1856–1856) without posterity,
- Marie-Françoise Soulouque (1858–1858) without posterity.

He died in 1875 at the age of 44.
