= Anolis doris =

Scientific classification
- Kingdom: Animalia
- Phylum: Chordata
- Class: Reptilia
- Order: Squamata
- Suborder: Iguania
- Family: Dactyloidae
- Genus: Anolis
- Species: A. doris

Binomial name
- Anolis doris Barbour, 1925

Species of lizard

Anolis doris, the Gonave stout anole, is a species of lizard in the family Dactyloidae. The species is endemic to Gonâve Island in Haiti. Males grow to 63 mm (2.5 in) and females to 47 mm (1.9 in) in snout–vent length.
