= Anolis gonavensis =

Scientific classification
- Kingdom: Animalia
- Phylum: Chordata
- Class: Reptilia
- Order: Squamata
- Suborder: Iguania
- Family: Dactyloidae
- Genus: Anolis
- Species: A. gonavensis

Binomial name
- Anolis gonavensis Köhler & Hedges, 2016

Species of lizard

Anolis gonavensis, the Gonave twig anole, is a species of lizard in the family Dactyloidae. The species is endemic to Haiti's Gonâve Island.
