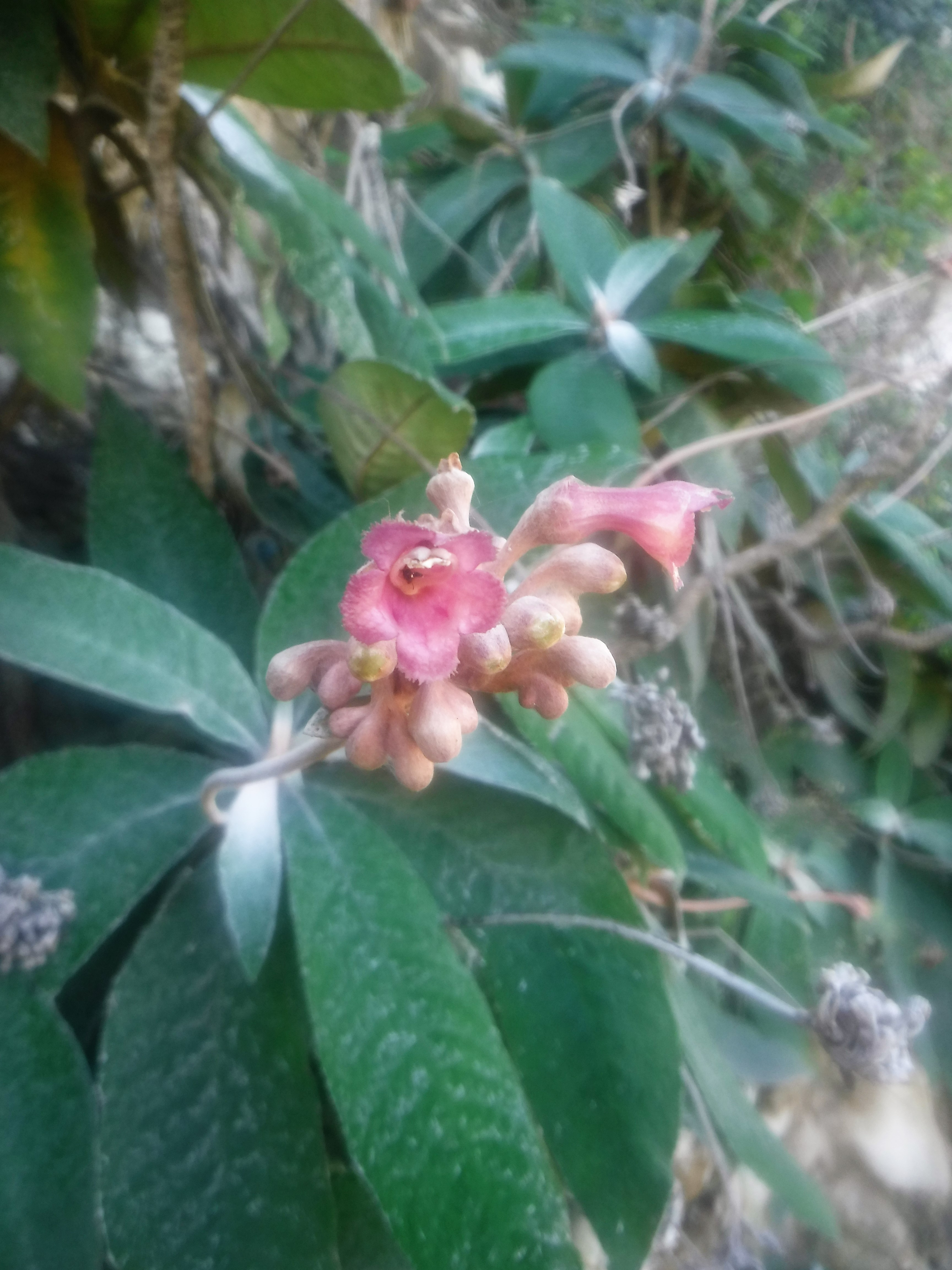

Scientific classification
- Kingdom: Plantae
- Clade: Tracheophytes
- Clade: Angiosperms
- Clade: Eudicots
- Clade: Asterids
- Order: Lamiales
- Family: Gesneriaceae
- Genus: Rhytidophyllum
- Species: R. leucomallon

Binomial name
- Rhytidophyllum leucomallon Hanst.

= Rhytidophyllum leucomallon =

Species of plant

Rhytidophyllum leucomallon is a species of plant in the family Gesneriaceae, endemic to Hispaniola. According to Liogier it can be found in the Dominican Republic (Banano, from Pedernales to El Aceitillar, S. Jose de Ocoa) and in Haiti (Massif de la Hotte, Massif de la Selle, Gonâve Island).
