= List of monarchs of Haiti =

Monarchy of Haiti
- Monarques d'Haïti (French); Monak Ayiti (Haitian Creole)
- Imperial
- Imperial coat of arms (1849–1859)

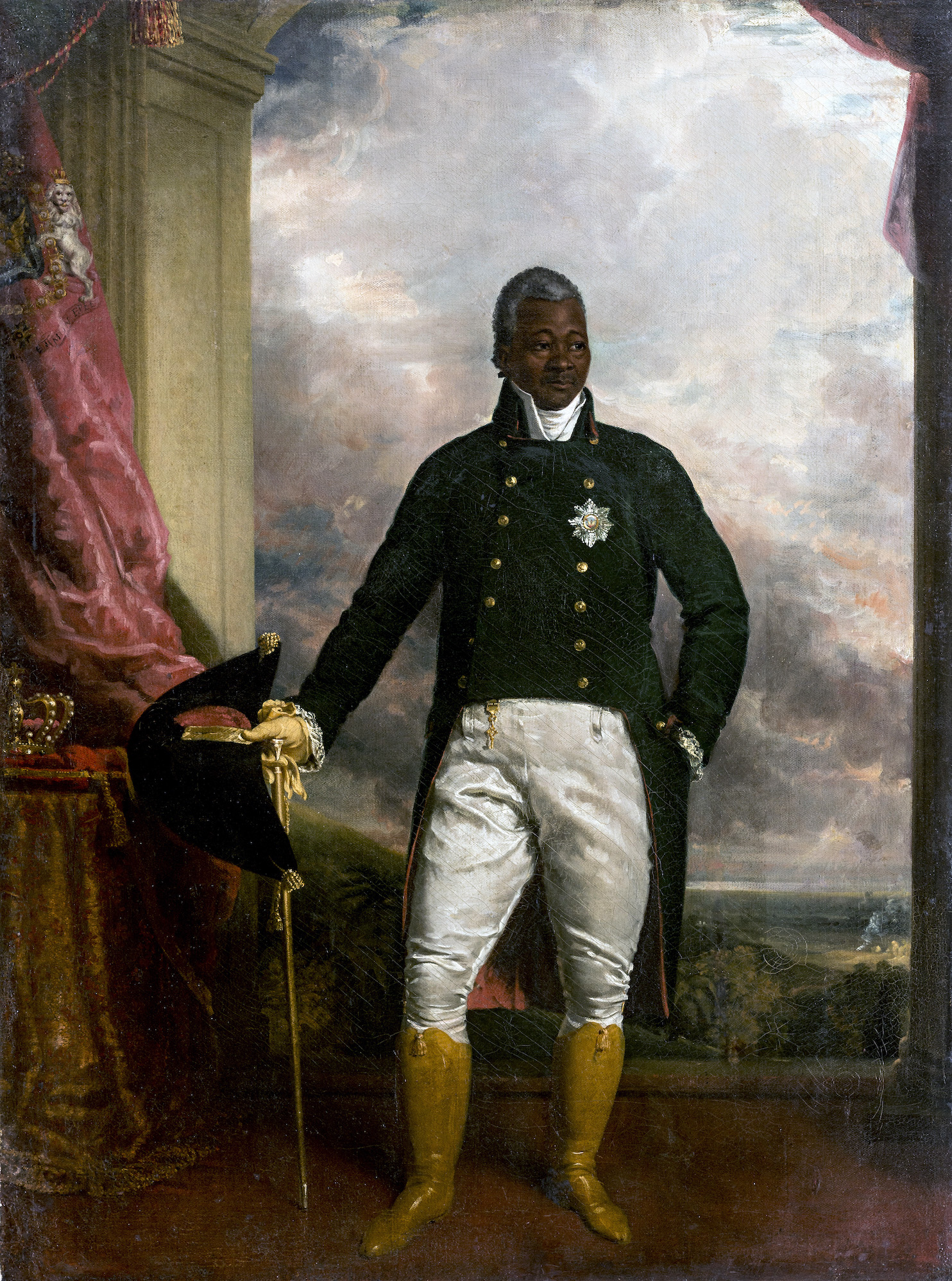
- Longest reigning Henry I 28 March 1811–8 October 1820

Details
- Style: His Royal Majesty; His Imperial Majesty
- First monarch: Jacques I (as Emperor)
- Last monarch: Faustin I (as Emperor)
- Formed: 22 September 1804
- Abolished: 15 January 1859
- Appointer: Elective (Note: During the First Empire of Haiti.); Hereditary

The monarchs of Haiti (French: monarques d'Haïti, Haitian Creole: Monak Ayiti) were the heads of state and rulers of Haiti on three non-consecutive occasions in the 19th century.

With complete independence achieved from France in 1804, Haiti became an independent monarchy—the First Empire of Haiti (1804–1806). Haiti reverted to a monarchy in the 1810s, during the Kingdom of Haiti (1811–1820). Haiti reverted for a third and final time to a monarchy during the Second Empire of Haiti (1849–1859).

The period known as the Duvalier dynasty (1957–1986), was not a period of monarchy but of an authoritarian family dictatorship (hereditary dictatorship).

== First Empire of Haiti (1804–1806) ==
Portrait	Coat of arms	Name (Birth–Death)	Reign			Title	Ref.
Portrait	Coat of arms	Name (Birth–Death)	Reign began	Reign ended	Time reigning	Title	Ref.
		Jacques I (1758–1806)	22 September 1804	17 October 1806 †	2 years, 25 days	Emperor of Haiti (Empereur d'Haïti)	

== Kingdom of Haiti (1811–1820) ==
Portrait	Coat of arms	Name (Birth–Death)	Reign			Title	Ref.
Portrait	Coat of arms	Name (Birth–Death)	Reign began	Reign ended	Time reigning	Title	Ref.
		Henry I (1767–1820)	28 March 1811	8 October 1820 †	9 years, 194 days	King of Haiti (Roi d'Haïti)	
		Henry II (1804–1820)	8 October 1820	18 October 1820 †	10 days	(Unproclaimed); King of Haiti (Roi d'Haïti)	

== Second Empire of Haiti (1849–1859) ==
Portrait	Coat of arms	Name (Birth–Death)	Reign			Title	Ref.
Portrait	Coat of arms	Name (Birth–Death)	Reign began	Reign ended	Time reigning	Title	Ref.
		Faustin I (1782–1867)	26 August 1849	15 January 1859	9 years, 142 days	Emperor of Haiti (Empereur d'Haïti)	

== Kingdom of La Gonâve (1870–?) ==
Portrait	Name (Birth–Death)	Reign			Title	Ref.
Portrait	Name (Birth–Death)	Reign began	Reign ended	Time reigning	Title	Ref.
	Olive I (1842-1883)	16 January 1870	23 July 1883	13 years, 188 days	Queen of La Gonâve (Reine de La Gonâve)	
	Célita I (1848-1912)	23 July 1883	27 January 1912	28 years, 188 days	Queen of La Gonâve (Reine de La Gonâve)	
	Ti Memenne (1868-1934)	27 January 1912	16 May 1934	22 years, 109 days	Queen of La Gonâve (Reine de La Gonâve)	
	Faustin II (1896–1945)	18 July 1926	17 August 1929	3 years, 30 days	King of La Gonâve (Roi de La Gonâve)	
	Julie I	16 May 1934	Unknown		Queen of La Gonâve (Reine de La Gonâve)	

== See also ==
- List of heads of state of Haiti
- List of Haitian royal consorts
- Crown of Faustin I
