= Faustin E. Wirkus =

Polish-American King of La Gonâve and United States Marine

Faustin II
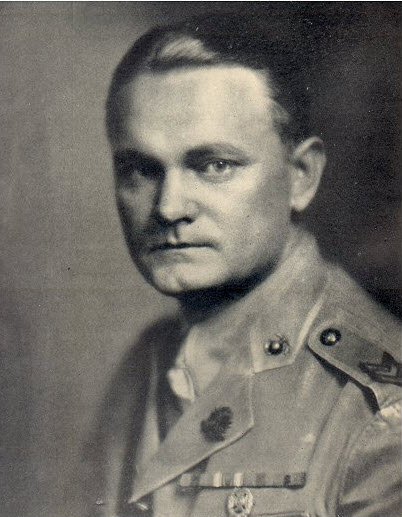

King of La Gonâve
- Reign: 18 July 1926 – 17 August 1929
- Coronation: 18 July 1926
- Predecessor: Ti Memenne
- Successor: Ti Memenne
- Co-monarch: Ti Memenne (1926-1929)
- Born: 26 November 1896; Rypin, Congress Poland, Russian Empire
- Died: 8 October 1945 (aged 48); Brooklyn, New York, United States
- Burial: Arlington National Cemetery
- Spouse: Yula Fuller
Names
- Faustin Edmond Wirkus
- Religion: Roman Catholicism
- Military career
- Allegiance: United States
- Branch: United States Marine Corps
- Service years: 1915 - 1931 (first term of service); 1939 - 1945 (second term)
- Rank: Gunnery sergeant (upon original discharge in 1931); Marine gunner (after reenlistment in 1939)
- Conflicts: United States occupation of Haiti; World War II

Faustin Edmond Wirkus (Haitian Creole: (R)wa Faustin II Wirkus; 16 November 1896 – 8 October 1945) was a Polish-American United States Marine stationed in Haiti during the United States occupation of Haiti (1915–1934). He was reputedly crowned Faustin II, King of La Gonâve, a Haitian island west of Hispaniola, by Queen Ti Memenne of La Gonâve on 18 July 1926, and co-ruled as monarch for three years until he was transferred by the United States Marine Corps to the United States mainland in 1929.

== Early life ==
According to an official biography, Wirkus was born in 1896 in Rypin (Congress Poland, in the Russian Empire) a small town now in Poland. There is some dispute as to where Faustin was actually born, as numerous ship passenger lists (records of the U.S. Customs Service) show his birth place as Pittston, Pennsylvania. The earliest known record of his birth is found in the 1900 United States Census, where he is found with his family in Brooklyn, New York. He is listed as "Palestine Weirkus" born November 1896 in Poland Russia. His younger brother Stephen Weirkus is listed as being three months old and born in New York state. Therefore Faustin was either born in Rypin (Poland), or born in Brooklyn, but not in Dupont, Luzerne, Pennsylvania. He most likely felt that he was 'from' this area as that is where his formative years were spent.

He and his parents settled in Dupont, Pennsylvania in approximately 1905, a coal mining community northwest of Wilkes-Barre, where he was raised. At the age of 11, he started sorting coal in Pittston.

== Military career ==
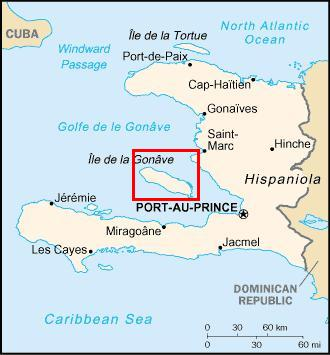
Location of the island of La Gonâve, west of Port-au-Prince, Haiti

Wirkus enlisted in the US Marine Corps in 1915 and served in the 1st Advance Base Brigade in Haiti and rose to the rank of corporal in 1918 then to gunnery sergeant in 1920. During his service in the Marine Corps, he was promoted to a lieutenant in the Garde d'Haiti, commanding a squad of native troops on La Gonâve. After rescuing a young woman in trouble, he found out that she was Queen Timemenne of La Gonâve. He was welcomed by the population as Timemenne had told them how kind he was to her, and in part, due to the unusual circumstance that he had the same first name as the former emperor of Haiti, Faustin Soulouque, later known as Faustin I ("Faustin the First"), who died in 1867. The natives proclaimed him Faustin II in a Voodoo ritual and he ruled jointly with Queen Timemenne for three years. He became known for dispensing ready but gentle justice.

== Later life ==
Wirkus left the Marine Corps in 1931 as a Gunnery Sergeant. He returned to the Marine Corps in 1939 as a recruiting specialist where he rose to the rank of Marine Gunner (Infantry Weapons Officer, 0306). In 1944 he was appointed an aviation gunnery instructor at the Chapel Hill, North Carolina Navy Pre-Flight School. He died at the Brooklyn Naval Hospital.

Wirkus is buried at Arlington National Cemetery in Virginia.

== In popular culture ==
Wirkus wrote an autobiographical account of his time in Haiti, with Taney Dudley and an introduction by William Seabrook, entitled The White King of La Gonave: The True Story of the Sergeant of Marines Who Was Crowned King on a Voodoo Island, published by Doubleday, Doran and Company, Inc. in 1931. Seabrook also published Wirkus' account of the occupation in his travel narrative, The Magic Island.

A 1933 featurette titled Voodoo produced by Sol Lesser featured Wirkus telling his story.
