= Marie-Claire Heureuse Félicité =

Haitian empress

Marie-Claire Heureuse Félicité Bonheur Dessalines
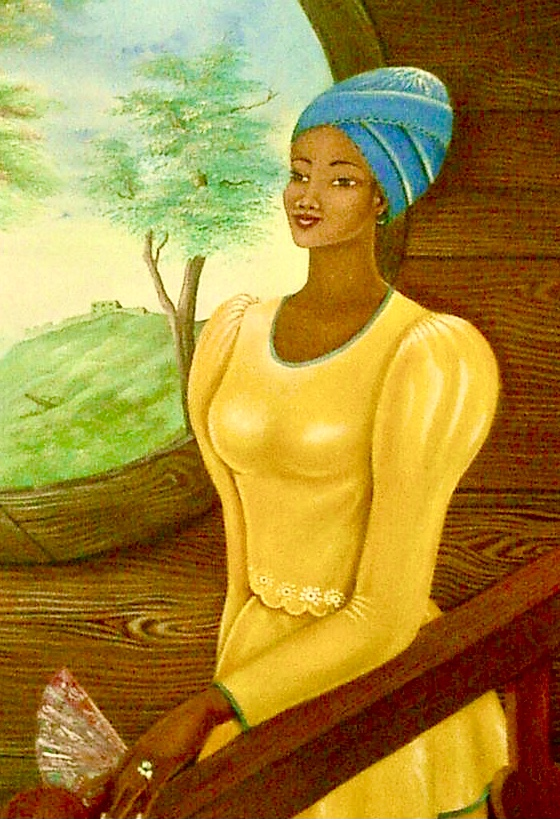

Empress consort of Haiti
- Tenure: 2 September 1804 – 17 October 1806
- Coronation: 8 October 1804
- Born: 8 May 1758; Léogâne, Saint-Domingue
- Died: 8 August 1858 (aged 100); Gonaïves, Haiti
- Spouse: Pierre Lunic, deceased in 1795; Jean-Jacques Dessalines
- Father: Guillaume Bonheur
- Mother: Marie-Sainte Lobelot
- Religion: Roman Catholic

Empress Marie-Claire Heureuse Félicité Bonheur, Empress of Haiti (8 May 1758 – 8 August 1858) was the Empress of Haiti (1804–1806) as the wife of Jean-Jacques Dessalines.

== Background ==
She was born in Léogâne to a poor but free family as the daughter of Guillaume Bonheur and Marie-Sainte Lobelot. She was educated by her aunt Élise Lobelot, who was the governess of a religious order. She married Pierre Lunic, master-cartwright to the Brothers of Saint-Jean de Dieu. She became a widow in 1795.

== The siege of Jacmel ==
During the siege of Jacmel in 1800, she made herself a name for her work for the wounded and starving. She managed to convince Dessalines, who was one of the parties besieging the city, to allow some roads to the city to be opened, so that the wounded in the city could receive help. She led a procession of women and children with food, clothes and medicine back to the city, and then arranged for the food to be cooked on the streets.

== Life with Dessalines ==
On 2 April 1800, she married Jean-Jacques Dessalines, with whom she had a long-time relationship. They had seven children:

- Princess Marie Françoise Célimène Dessalines (Saint-Marc, 2 October 1789 – 1859). Legitimated by the subsequent marriage of her parents. She never married, but had a daughter with Captain Bernard Chancy.
- Albert Dessalines (died young before 1804). Legitimated by the subsequent marriage of her parents.
- Prince Jacques Bien Aimé Dessalines (Saint-Marc, 2 April 1793 – aft. 1832). Legitimated by the subsequent marriage of his parents. He never married, but had one daughter by Adélaïde Appolon.
- Princess Célestine Dessalines (Saint-Marc, 2 April 1793 – 10 August 1867), twin with her brother Jacques. Legitimated by the subsequent marriage of her parents. Married at Cap-Henry, 10 April 1817, to Pierre Daux. No issue.
- Princess Jeanne Sophie Dessalines (20 January 1799 – 10 August 1867). Legitimated by the subsequent marriage of her parents. Married to N. Cazenave. No issue.
- Louis Dessalines (died young before 1804). Legitimated by the subsequent marriage of her parents.
- Princess Serine Dessalines.

Marie-Claire was described as kind, merciful and natural, with an elegant and cordial manner. She adopted the numerous children produced by Dessalines' adulterous affairs. She was a contrast to her husband in her tolerance and support and by showing indiscriminate kindness to people of all colors. She was a great opponent of Dessalines' policy toward the white French people of Haiti; she saw to the needs of the prisoners, and she did not hesitate, despite her husband's anger, to save many of them from battle wounds suffered during the revolution war. She is reported to have fallen to her knees before him to beg him to spare their lives and is said to have hidden one of them, Descourtilz, under her own bed to save him. She was made Empress of Haiti in 1804 upon the creation of the monarchy of Haiti, and crowned with her husband at the Church of Champ de Mars on 8 October 1804. She kept the status for two years.

== Later life ==
After the deposition and death of her Dessalines in 1806, she denied the offer from Henri Christophe to move in with his family. As a widow, she was styled Princess Dowager on 17 October 1806. As the property of her late husband was confiscated, she lived in poverty in Saint-Marc until August 1843, when she was granted a pension 1,200 gourdes.

In 1849, when Faustin I of Haiti became Emperor, he idealized the late Dessalines and enlarged Marie-Claire's pension as a sign of his admiration. Marie-Claire, who felt no sympathy for this attitude, refused the money. She moved in with her granddaughter, and lived in poverty until her death in 1858 in Gonaïves.

== Legacy ==
In her honour, the Fondation Marie-Claire Heureuse Félicité Bonheur Dessalines, also known as the Fondasyon Félicité (FF), was established by Dr Bayyinah Bello in 1999 to undertake humanitarian, social and educational work in Haiti. Soon after the 2010 Haiti earthquake, the non-profit organization Friends of Fondation Félicité was set up to support FF in helping the Haitian people to rebuild their country.

== See also ==
- Adélina Lévêque
- Marie-Louise Coidavid
