= Pointe-à-Raquette =

Pointe-à-Raquette Pwentarakèt
- Commune
- Location in Haiti
- Coordinates: 18°47′08″N 73°03′42″W
- Country: Haiti
- Department: Ouest
- Arrondissement: La Gonâve

Area
  - Total: 316.0 km^{2} (122.0 sq mi)
- Elevation: 16 m (52 ft)

Population (7 August 2003)
  - Total: 22,886
  - Density: 72.4/km^{2} (188/sq mi)
- Time zone: UTC-05:00 (EST)
  - Summer (DST): UTC-04:00 (EDT)

Pointe-à-Raquette (French pronunciation: [pwɛ̃t a ʁakɛt]; Haitian Creole: Pwentarakèt) is a commune in the La Gonâve Arrondissement, in the Ouest department of Haiti. It has 22,886 inhabitants.
