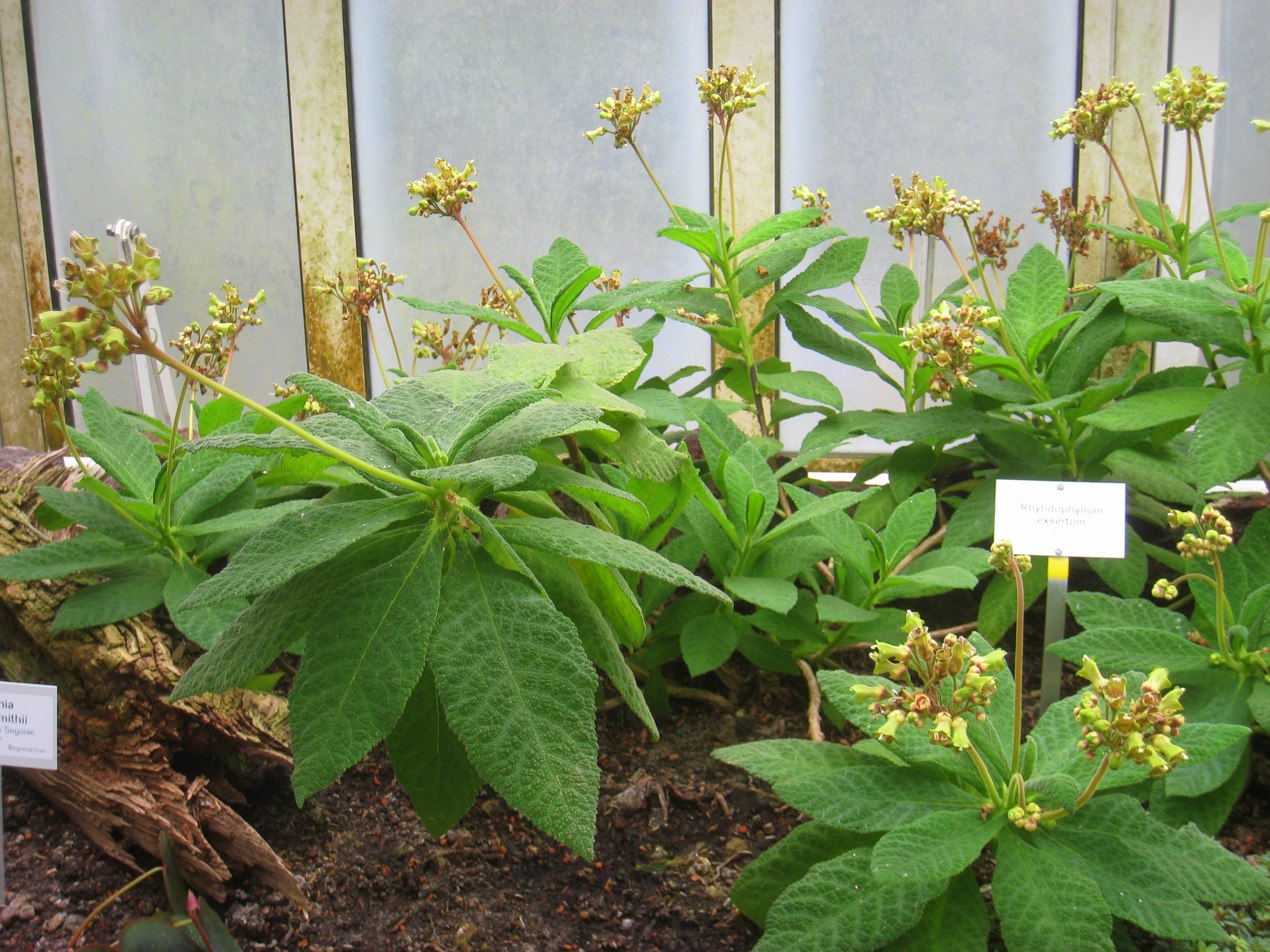
- Rhytidophyllum exsertum

Scientific classification
- Kingdom: Plantae
- Clade: Tracheophytes
- Clade: Angiosperms
- Clade: Eudicots
- Clade: Asterids
- Order: Lamiales
- Family: Gesneriaceae
- Genus: Rhytidophyllum; Mart. (1829)

Species
- 23; see text

= Rhytidophyllum =

Genus of plants

Rhytidophyllum is a genus of plant in family Gesneriaceae, native to the Caribbean islands and northern South America.

== Species ==
23 species are accepted.

- Rhytidophyllum acunae C.V.Morton
- Rhytidophyllum asperum Alain
- Rhytidophyllum auriculatum Hook.
- Rhytidophyllum berteroanum Mart.
- Rhytidophyllum caribaeum Urb.
- Rhytidophyllum coccineum Urb.
- Rhytidophyllum crenulatum DC.
- Rhytidophyllum cumanense (Hanst.) L.E.Skog
- Rhytidophyllum daisyanum Jiménez Rodr. & Zanoni
- Rhytidophyllum earlei (Urb. & Britton) C.V.Morton
- Rhytidophyllum exsertum Griseb.
- Rhytidophyllum grande (Sw.) Mart.
- Rhytidophyllum grandiflorum Z.R.Xu & L.E.Skog ex Zanoni & Jiménez Rodr.
- Rhytidophyllum lanatum Urb. & Ekman
- Rhytidophyllum leucomallon Hanst.
- Rhytidophyllum lomense (Urb.) C.V.Morton
- Rhytidophyllum minus Urb.
- Rhytidophyllum onacaense (Rusby) L.E.Skog
- Rhytidophyllum petiolare DC.
- Rhytidophyllum rhodocalyx Urb.
- Rhytidophyllum rupincola (Urb.) C.V.Morton
- Rhytidophyllum tomentosum (L.) Mart.
- Rhytidophyllum vernicosum Urb. & Ekman
