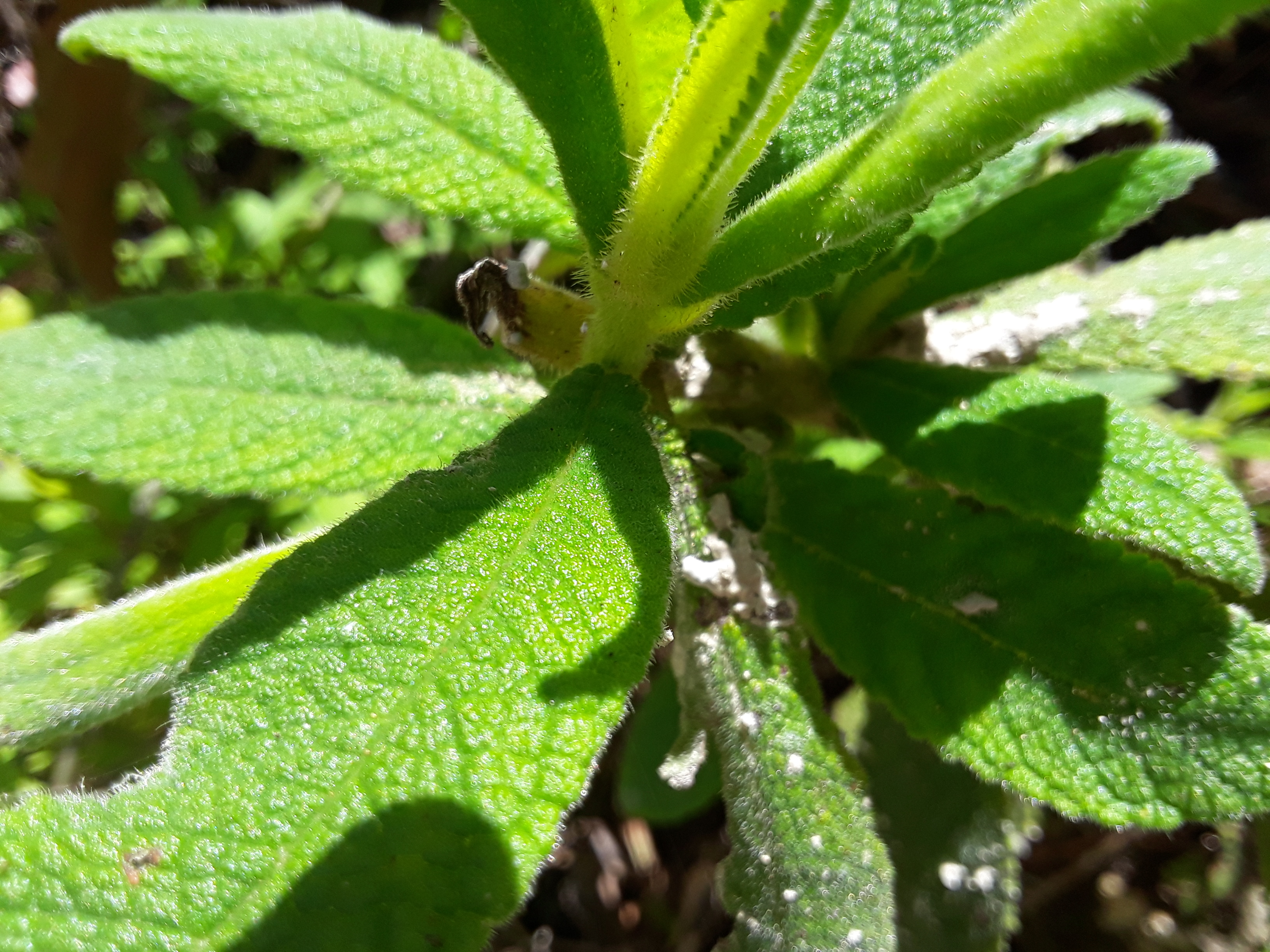

Scientific classification
- Kingdom: Plantae
- Clade: Embryophytes
- Clade: Tracheophytes
- Clade: Angiosperms
- Clade: Eudicots
- Clade: Asterids
- Order: Lamiales
- Family: Gesneriaceae
- Genus: Rhytidophyllum
- Species: R. tomentosum

Binomial name
- Rhytidophyllum tomentosum (L.) Mart.

= Rhytidophyllum tomentosum =

Species of flowering plant

Rhytidophyllum tomentosum is a perennial flowering shrub belonging to the Gesneriaceae family. It is a member of the Rhytidophyllum genus.

In Jamaica the vernacular names for R. tomentosum are "search my heart" or "heart bush".

== Habitat ==
Rhytidophyllum tomentosum is native to Jamaica. The shrub thrives in shaded damp rocky hillsides on the island. It has been introduced to the Cayman Islands, Cuba, and Trinidad and Tobago.

== Description ==
Rhytidophyllum tomentosum has long slender lime-green to dark green hairy leaves that are between 6 and 8 inches (15 and 20 cm) long. The leaves are pointed at both ends and have jagged edges.

The plant blooms light yellow tubular flowers that have dark red spots in the center.

== Traditional uses ==
Rhytidophyllum tomentosum leaves (fresh or dried) are used to make an herbal tea for heart palpitations, coughs, chest congestion, sinus infections, and menstrual cramps. However, these claims are all based on folk medicinal practices.

In addition, the plant's leaves and stems are combined with other ingredients to make Jamaican root tonic.
