= List of Haitian royal consorts =

== Empress and Queen of Haiti ==
Name	Father	Birth	Marriage	Became Consort	Coronation	Ceased to be Consort	Death	Spouse
First Empire of Haiti
Marie-Claire Heureuse Félicité	Bonheur Guillaume	8 May 1758; Léogâne, Saint-Domingue	2 April 1800 or 21 October 1801	22 September 1804 husband's accession	6 October 1804 at the Church of Champ-de-Mars, Cap-Henry	17 October 1806 husband's assassination	8 August 1858; Gonaïves, Haiti	Jacques I
Kingdom of Haiti
Marie-Louise Coidavid	M. Melgrin	8 May 1778; Bredou, Ouanaminthe, Saint-Domingue	15 July 1793	28 March 1811 husband's accession	2 June 1811 at the Church of Champ-de-Mars, Cap-Henry	8 October 1820 husband's suicide	14 March 1851; Pisa, Tuscany	Henry I
Second Empire of Haiti
Adélina Lévêque	Marie Michel Lévêque	26 July 1820; Manegue, Arcahaie, Haiti	11 December 1849		18 April 1852 at Port-au-Prince	22 January 1859 husband's abdication	12 October 1878; Port-au-Prince, Haiti	Faustin I
