= Célita Soulouque =

Haitian princess

Princess Célita
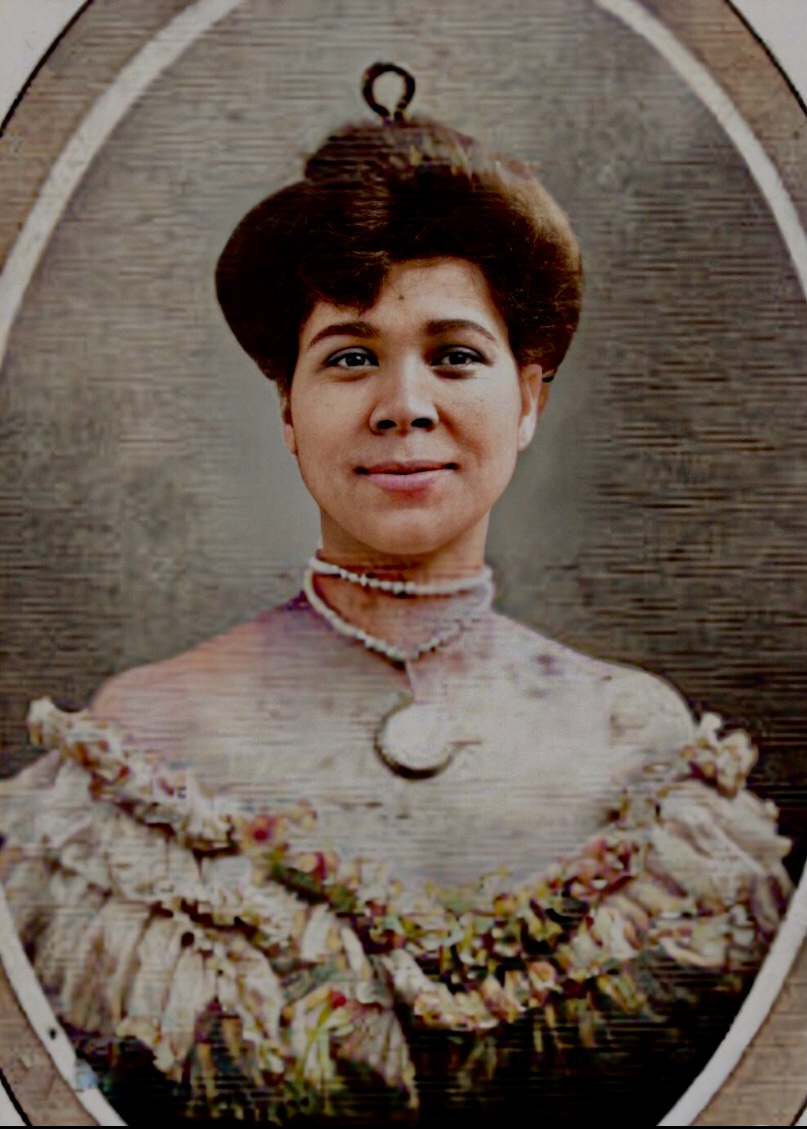

Queen of La Gonâve
- Reign: 23 July 1883 – 27 January 1912
- Predecessor: Olive Soulouque
- Successor: Ti Memenne
- Born: 13 February 1848; Port-au-Prince, Haiti
- Died: 27 January 1912 (aged 63); Anse-à-Galets, La Gonâve, Haiti
- Spouse: Jean Philippe Lubin, Count of Pétion-Ville
Names
- Célestine Marie Françoise Soulouque
- House: Soulouque
- Father: Faustin I of Haiti
- Mother: Adélina Lévêque

Princess Célestine Marie Françoise Soulouque (13 February 1848 – 27 January 1912) was a Haitian princess and the daughter of Emperor Faustin I and Empress Adélina Lévêque.

== Early life and family ==
Célita was born in Port-au-Prince on 13 February 1848 as the youngest child of Faustin Soulouque, the president of Haiti, and Adélina Lévêque. The following year, her father became Emperor of Haiti and she became a princess and adopted the style of Imperial Highness.

== Exile ==
In 1859, her father was overthrown in a coup led by General Fabre Geffrard. Following the emperor's abdication, and Geffrad's proclamation of the Republic of Haiti and election as president, the imperial family were forced into exile.

Célita was ten years old when the empire fell, and spent most of her childhood in exile, first in Jamaica, then Paris, and finally Curaçao, where they were granted asylum by King William III of the Netherlands.

She did not return to Haiti until 1867, when her cousin President Sylvain Salnave, authorized the return of the imperial family. A few weeks after the family's return to Haiti, Célita's father died, leaving her older sister, Olive, Princess Imperial, as heir to the imperial throne.

== Queen of La Gonâve ==
As the sovereign of La Gonâve, Célita was the object of a veritable cult, fueled by the Vodou culture, deeply rooted on the island, which made the queen a sacred figure, embodying natural and legitimate authority. The organization of power allowed for a degree of economic development for this island with its fragile resources. Over the years, the queen increasingly delegated her power, retaining only a symbolic and honorary role. Political control was reserved for the royal council, a body composed of members of the queen's family, generally eight to ten people, including the sovereign's husband, Prince Jean-Henri.

Between 1880 and 1896, relations with the Haitian government were quite stable, given that during this period Haiti was led by people close to Célita, including her cousin Florvil Hyppolite. The rise of Tirésias Simon Sam in 1896 brought an end to the good relations between Haiti and La Gonâve. The country's new strongman, hostile to the Soulouque lineage, wanted to regain control of the island and impose a military council composed of Haitians loyal to Port-au-Prince. Despite the high tensions, no military expedition took place.

In 1902, Tirésias was overthrown by a revolutionary movement, a few weeks before the coup d'état by Pierre Nord Alexis, Célita's father-in-law, who seized power and declared himself president for life.

Wishing to see the emergence of a unified family empire, he sent an expeditionary force to La Gonâve and imposed a so-called charter of submission on his daughter-in-law, forcing the queen to relinquish all her political prerogatives and dissolve the royal council, replacing it with a delegate general appointed by Nord Alexis. The queen was also compelled to alter her line of succession. From the moment of her accession, she had designated her niece, Timemenne, as her heir, but Nord Alexis preferred that the succession pass to his own son, Pierre-Henri Faustin, Célita's son. By inheriting both the title of King of La Gonâve and supreme power in Haiti, he would enable the restoration of the Haitian Empire.

The 1908 revolution, which brought about the fall of Nord Alexis, ended this period of subjugation. La Gonâve regained its political autonomy, and the queen all her prerogatives. The royal council was restored, and Haitian soldiers were repatriated to Port-au-Prince. Nevertheless, Célita retained her son as her heir until his death in 1910.

Queen Célita died on January 27, 1912, in Anse-à-Galets, leaving her niece to succeed her on the throne.

== Marriage ==
Célita married Jean Philippe Lubin, Count of Pétion-Ville.
