= Crown of Faustin I =

Crown of Faustin Soulouque

Crown of Faustin Soulouque
- Faustin I with the crown

Details
- Country: Empire of Haiti
- Made: 1850
- Owner: Haiti
- Arches: 8
- Material: Gold
- Cap: Red velvet
- Notable stones: 720 diamonds 8 rubies 8 sapphires garnets emeralds

The crown of Faustin I is the crown of Faustin Soulouque, who ruled over Haiti as President of the Republic from 1847 to 1849 and as Emperor Faustin I of the Second Empire from 1849 to 1859. The crown is decorated with emeralds, diamonds, garnets, and other jewels. It had been exhibited in the Musée du Panthéon National Haïtien (MUPANAH). However, it was found that some jewels on the crown were stolen at some unknown time. Due to the vandalism it suffered, the crown was transferred, under high surveillance, to a safe place for protection on January 31, 2007.
