= List of lighthouses in Haiti =

This is a list of lighthouses in Haiti.

== Lighthouses ==
Name	Image	Year built	Location & coordinates	Class of Light	Focal height	NGA number	Admiralty number	Range nml
Banc de Rochelois Lighthouse	Image	n/a	Gulf of Gonâve; 18°38′25.9″N 73°12′23.4″W	Mo (A) W 10s.	9 metres (30 ft)	14172	J5836	9
Cap du Mole St. Nicolas Lighthouse		1922 est.	Môle-Saint-Nicolas Arrondissement; 19°49′18.0″N 73°24′44.8″W	Oc W 3s.	n/a	14230	J5408	15
Cap Jacmel Lighthouse		n/a	Jacmel Arrondissement; 18°10′36.0″N 72°32′48.0″W	Fl W 6s.	39 metres (128 ft)	14156	J5368	9
Grande Cayemite Lighthouse		1925 est.	Les Cayemites; 18°38′38.9″N 73°45′32.9″W	V Q W	16 metres (52 ft)	14164	J5380	12
Île-à-Vache Lighthouse		1922 est.	Île-à-Vache; 18°04′05.3″N 73°34′18.5″W	Q (6) + L Fl W 15s.	n/a	14158	J5370	n/a
Île de la Tortue Pointe de l’ Est Lighthouse	Image	1924	Île de la Tortue; 19°59′48.6″N 72°37′16.7″W	Fl (2) W 6s.	23 metres (75 ft)	14232	J5414	14
Île de la Tortue Pointe Ouest Lighthouse		1924 est.	Île de la Tortue; 20°03′42.3″N 72°58′05.4″W	V Q W	n/a	14234	J5412	n/a
Les Arcadins Lighthouse	Image	1882	Gulf of Gonâve; 18°48′11.7″N 72°38′56.8″W	Fl (2) W 5s.	12 metres (39 ft)	14220	J5402	9
Pointe Fantasque Lighthouse	Image	n/a	Gonâve Island; 18°41′38.7″N 72°49′22.1″W	Q (6) + L Fl W 15s.	15 metres (49 ft)	14184	J5384	9
Pointe du Lamentin Lighthouse		1864 est.	Carrefour; 18°33′12.6″N 72°24′35.6″W	Fl W 3s.	32 metres (105 ft)	14192	J5390	16
Pointe Lapierre Lighthouse		1928	Gonaïves Arrondissement; 19°27′16.4″N 72°45′04.5″W	V Q (6) + L Fl W 10s.	97 metres (318 ft)	14228	J5406	11
Pointe Ouest Lighthouse	Image	1925 est.	Gonâve Island; 18°55′40.0″N 73°17′54.5″W	Fl (4) W 15s.	85 metres (279 ft)	14168	J5382	20
Pointe de Saint-Marc Lighthouse		1924	Saint-Marc; 19°02′44.6″N 72°49′12.7″W	Q (9) W 15s.	29 metres (95 ft)	14224	J5404	9

== See also ==
- Lists of lighthouses and lightvessels
