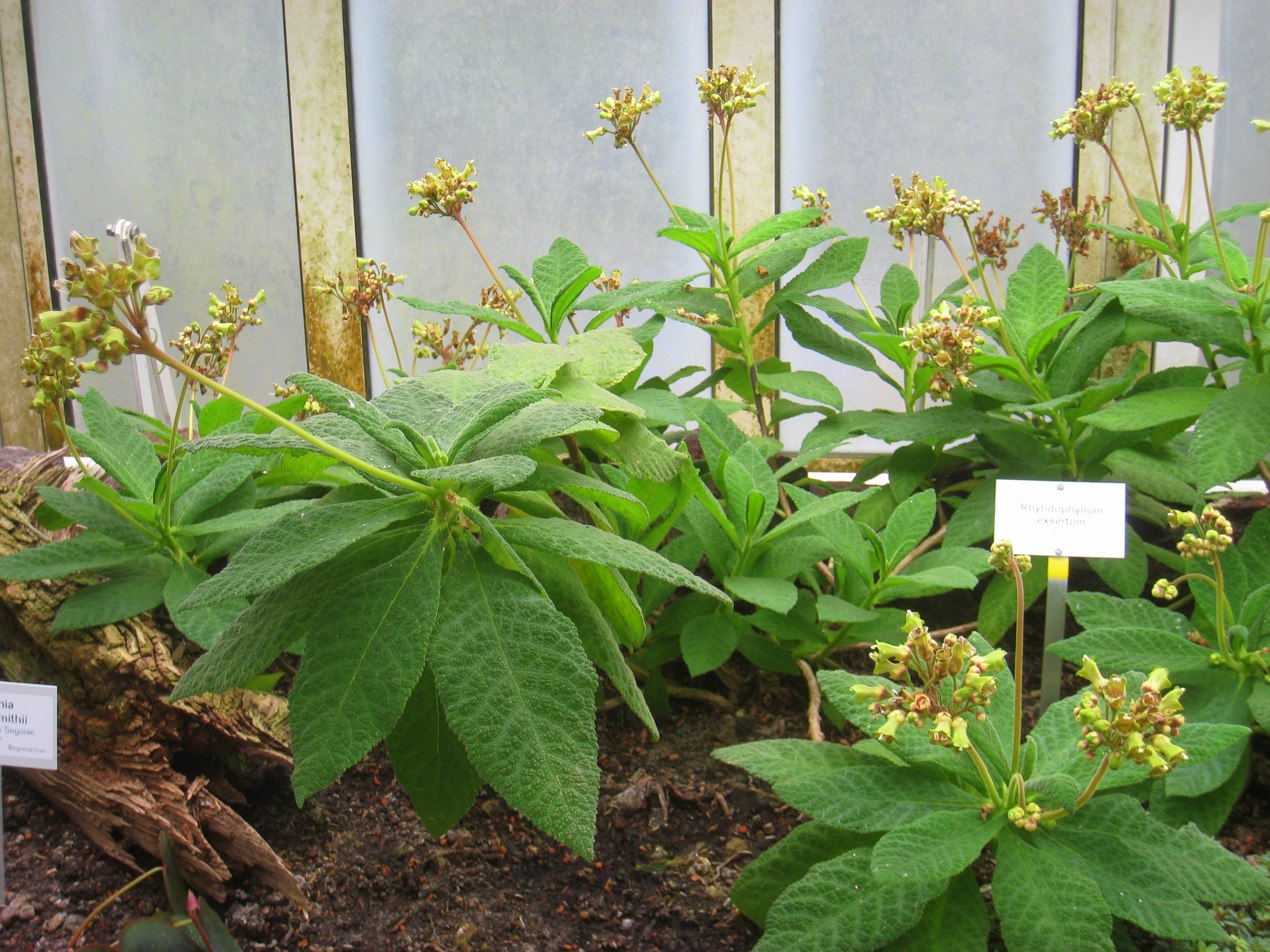

Scientific classification
- Kingdom: Plantae
- Clade: Tracheophytes
- Clade: Angiosperms
- Clade: Eudicots
- Clade: Asterids
- Order: Lamiales
- Family: Gesneriaceae
- Genus: Rhytidophyllum
- Species: R. exsertum

Binomial name
- Rhytidophyllum exsertum Griseb.

Synonyms
- Rhytidophyllum exsertum subsp. villosulum (Urb.) Borhidi; Rhytidophyllum exsertum subsp. wrightianum (Griseb.) Borhidi; Rhytidophyllum mogoticola Borhidi & O.Muñiz; Rhytidophyllum tomentosum f. villosulum Urb.; Rhytidophyllum tomentosum f. viscidum Urb.; Rhytidophyllum villosulum (Urb.) C.V.Morton; Rhytidophyllum wrightianum Griseb.

= Rhytidophyllum exsertum =

Species of flowering plant

Rhytidophyllum exsertum is a species of plant in the family Gesneriaceae, native to Cuba.
