= Euphémie Daguilh =

Euphémie Daguilh (died in Les Cayes, Haiti, 1834), was a Haitian composer and choreographer, royal mistress of emperor Jean-Jacques Dessalines. She and cared for the wounded during the campaign of 1805. Haitian legal historian Mirlande Manigat refers to her as Euphémie Daguile. She is believed to have been Dessalines' most influential mistress.

Euphémie Daguilh

== Life ==
Daguilh met Dessalines in Les Cayes during his campaign in Southern Haiti, where she nursed him during his sickness. She followed Dessalines during his campaign against Santo Domingo and made her name tending to the wounded soldiers during gunfight. Thomas Madiou has referred to her as a heroine.

Euphémie Daguilh composed several songs which became popular in Haiti.

Her relationship with Dessalines was public and a letter paper was printed with the text: "The Friend of Jacques, His Majesty Emperor of Haiti", and she was granted an allowance. Daguilh hosted a salon with the task to spy on the military of Southern Haiti. While Dessalines was still alive, her monthly expenses paid by the state were about 1,000 gourdes. Upon complaints to Dessalines by Balthazar Inginac, Director of state properties for the West of Haiti, her allowance was reduced to 800 piastres.

When Dessalines was deposed, a mob broke into her home with the intent to lynch her, but she managed to calm them by serving them dessert and singing her compositions to them. She later married one of the prominent members of the Haitian military, Lacoude Bellefleur aka Bellefleur Laconde with whom she'd had children before her liaison with Dessalines.
