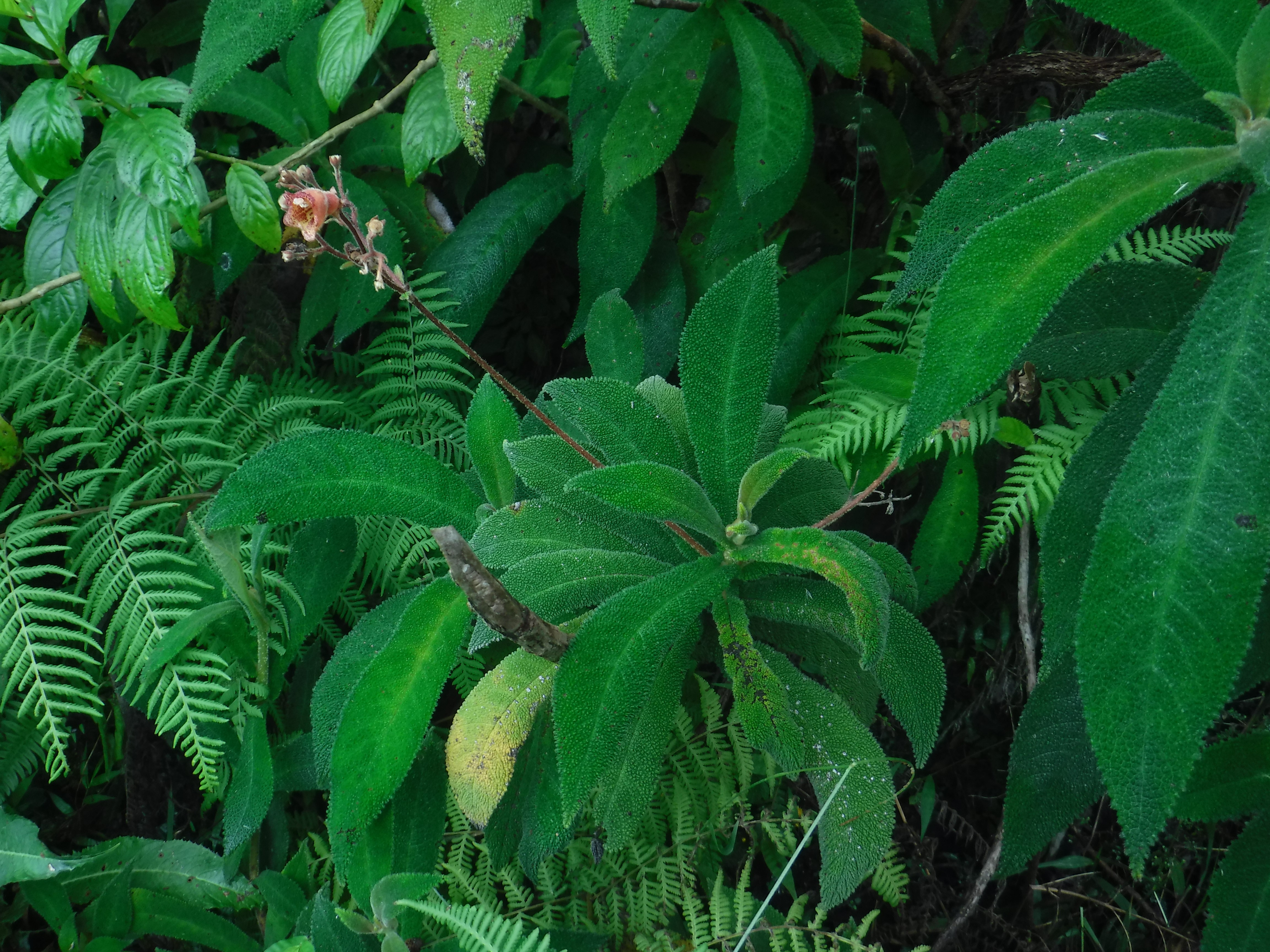

Scientific classification
- Kingdom: Plantae
- Clade: Tracheophytes
- Clade: Angiosperms
- Clade: Eudicots
- Clade: Asterids
- Order: Lamiales
- Family: Gesneriaceae
- Genus: Rhytidophyllum
- Species: R. auriculatum

Binomial name
- Rhytidophyllum auriculatum Hook.

= Rhytidophyllum auriculatum =

Species of flowering plant

Rhytidophyllum auriculatum is a species of plant in the family Gesneriaceae, endemic to Hispaniola. According to Liogier it can be found in Haiti (Massif de la Hotte, Massif de la Selle). The flowers are pollinated by bats.
