= Olive Soulouque =

- Princess Imperial of Haiti
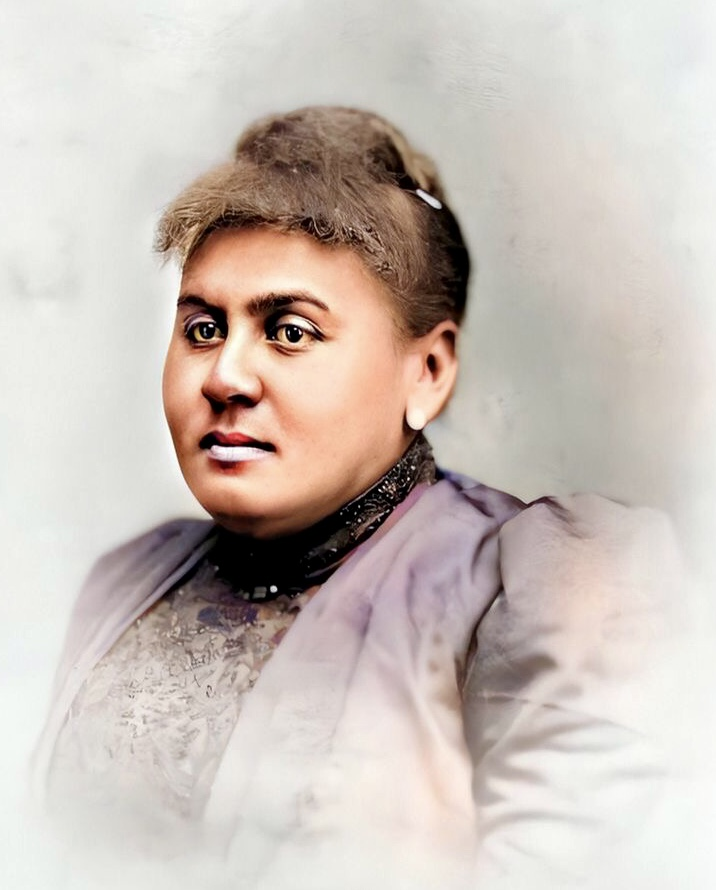

Queen of La Gonâve
- Reign: 16 January 1870 – 23 July 1883
- Predecessor: Sylvain Salnave (as President of Haiti)
- Successor: Célita
- Born: 29 November 1842; Haiti
- Died: 23 July 1883 (aged 40); Port-au-Prince, Haiti
- Spouse: Pierre-Joseph Théodore de Vil-Lubin
- Issue: Faustin-Elvérius de Vil-Lubin
- House: Soulouque
- Father: Faustin I of Haiti
- Mother: Adélina Lévêque

Olive Soulouque, Princess Imperial of Haiti (29 November 1842 – 23 July 1883) was a Haitian princess and the eldest daughter of Emperor Faustin I of Haiti and Empress Adélina Lévêque.

== Life ==
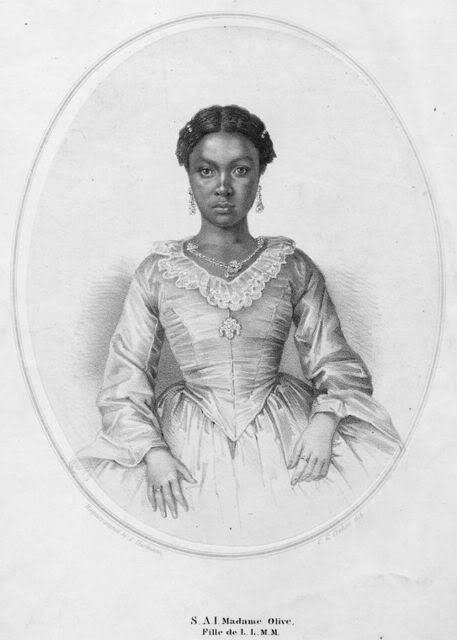
The Princess Imperial of Haiti

=== Early life ===
Olive Soulouque was the eldest of two daughters of Faustin Soulouque and Adélina Lévêque. Born illegitimate, she was legitimated after the marriage of her parents on 31 December 1847, and raised to the title of Princess Imperial of Haiti and granted the style of Imperial Highness on 26 August 1849. She was a sister of Princess Célita Soulouque.

As princess, Olive is reported to have had a governess by the name Madame le Chevalier de Bonheur, and an "equally brilliant" household as her mother, who had a grand aumônier (grand almoner), two dames d'honneur (ladies of honor), two tirewomen, 56 dames du palais (ladies of the palace), 22 dames de la chapelle (ladies of the chapel), chamberlains and pages: all of them from the newly appointed nobility of Faustin and had the titles duchess, countess, baroness or marchioness.

As there was no male heir to the Haitian Empire, her father changed the constitution in order to allow her to succeed him.

When her father was deposed in 1859, she and her family followed her parents in exile. The family was allowed to return to Haiti and her father and mother died in 1867 and 1878 respectively. Upon the death of her father, Olive was recognised by Soulouquist supporters as head of the Imperial household.

After the announcement of the execution of Sylvain Salnave on January 15, 1870, the main administrators and high dignitaries present on La Gonâve decided to secede from the Haitian government, and set up a monarchical system on the island with the Soulouque family. Princess Olive was thus proclaimed Queen of La Gonâve.

The queen then became a leading figure in a matriarchal society, dominating the social and economic affairs of La Gonâve. Vodou, a belief system of African origin, was very prevalent on the island, even though the imperial family was Catholic. The followers of voodoo then devoted a veritable cult to the royal function and the very image of the queen.

Queen Olive's authority over the island of La Gonâve was not officially recognized by the republican government. Despite this, she is regarded by the island's population as the natural and spiritual sovereign. In 1880, the new Haitian dictator, Lysius Salomon, former minister of Emperor Faustin and loyal to the Soulouque family, recognized the special status of La Gonâve, accepting the idea of a traditional monarchy allowing the island to develop without the intervention of the central government.

The queen died in Anse-à-Galets, the island's main town, on July 23, 1883, leaving the throne of La Gonâve to her younger sister, Princess Célita.

On July 23, 1861, she married in Kingston, the Count of Pétion-Ville, Pierre-Joseph Théodore de Vil-Lubin (1839-1881), her distant cousin. From this union was born a son: Prince Faustin-Elvérius de Vil-Lubin (1865-1877), who died without issue.
