= Jean-Jacques Dessalines =

Haitian revolutionary and first ruler (1758–1806)

Jacques I
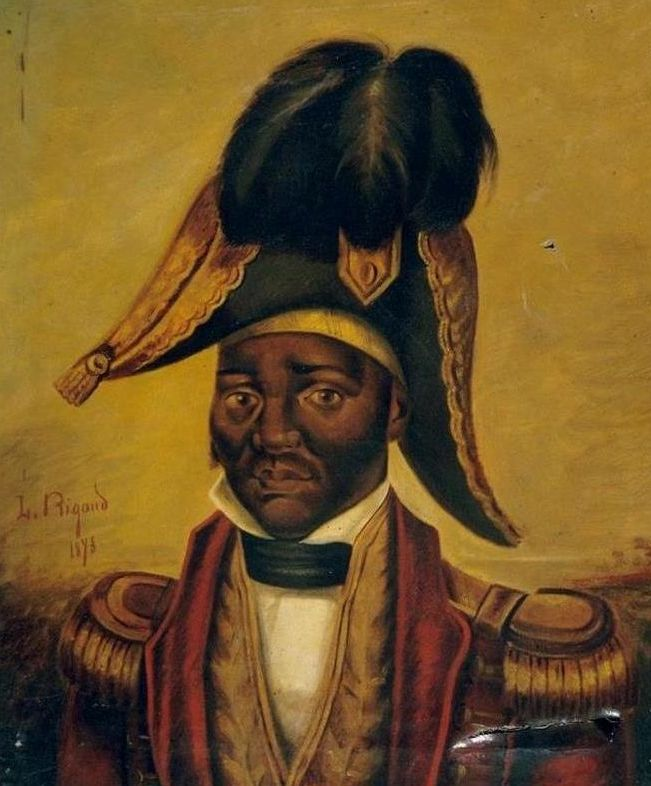
- Portrait by Louis Rigaud, 1878

Emperor of Haiti
- Reign: 22 September 1804 – 17 October 1806
- Coronation: 8 October 1804
- Predecessor: Himself (as Governor General)
- Successor: Henri Christophe (as Provisional Chief of the Haitian Government); Alexandre Pétion (as President of Haiti)

Governor-General of Haiti
- In office: 1 January 1804 – 22 September 1804
- Predecessor: Donatien de Rochambeau
- Successor: Himself (as Emperor of Haiti)
- Born: 20 September 1758; Cormier, Grande-Rivière-du-Nord, Saint-Domingue
- Died: 17 October 1806 (aged 48); Pont Larnage, near Port-au-Prince, Empire of Haiti
- Burial: Cimetière intérieur, Church Ste-Anne, Haiti
- Spouse: Marie-Claire Heureuse Félicité
Names
- Jean-Jacques Dessalines
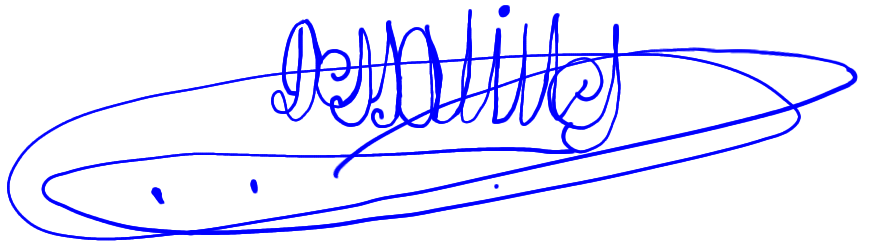
- Signature

Jean-Jacques Dessalines (Note: Born as Jean-Jacques Duclos) (French pronunciation: [ʒɑ̃ ʒak dɛsalin]; Haitian Creole: Jan-Jak Desalin; 20 September 1758 – 17 October 1806) was a Haitian politician and revolutionary who led the Haitian Revolution and served as the Emperor of Haiti from 1804 to 1806 and the first leader of an independent Haiti under the 1805 constitution. Initially regarded as governor-general, Dessalines was later named Emperor of Haiti as Jacques I (1804–1806) by generals of the Indigenous Army and ruled in that capacity until being assassinated in 1806. He spearheaded the resistance against French rule of Saint-Domingue, and eventually became the architect of the 1804 massacre of the remaining White French residents of newly independent Haiti. Alongside Toussaint Louverture, he has been referred to as one of the fathers of the nation of Haiti. Under the rule of Dessalines, Haiti became the first country in the Americas to permanently abolish slavery.

Dessalines served as an officer in the French army when Saint-Domingue was fending off Spanish and British incursions. Later he rose to become a commander in the revolt against France. As Toussaint Louverture's principal lieutenant, he led many successful engagements, including the Battle of Crête-à-Pierrot. In 1802, Louverture was betrayed and captured, and sent to prison in France, where he died. Thereafter, Dessalines became the leader of the revolution and Général-Chef de l'Armée Indigène on 18 May 1803. His forces defeated the French army at the Battle of Vertières on 18 November 1803. Saint-Domingue was declared independent on 29 November and then as the independent Republic of Haiti on 1 January 1804, under the leadership of Dessalines, chosen by a council of generals to assume the office of governor-general.

He ordered the 1804 Haitian massacre of the remaining White French population in Haiti, killing between 3,000 and 5,000 people, and an exodus of thousands. Some historians cite the threat of a French reinvasion and reinstatement of slavery as one of the reasons for the massacre. Dessalines excluded surviving Polish Legionnaires, who had defected from the French, as well as Germans who did not take part in the slave trade. He granted them full citizenship and classified them as black. Tensions remained with the minority mixed-race population, who had gained some education and property during the colonial period.

As Emperor, Dessalines enforced plantation labor to promote the economy and began an autocratic rule. In 1806, he was assassinated by members of his own administration and dismembered by a violent mob shortly thereafter. By the beginning of the 20th century, Dessalines began to be reassessed as an icon of Haitian nationalism. The national anthem of Haiti, "La Dessalinienne", written in 1903, is named in his honor.

== Early life ==
Of Afro-Caribbean origin, Jean-Jacques Duclos was born into slavery on Cormier, a plantation near Grande-Riviere-du-Nord, Saint-Domingue. His enslaved father had adopted the surname from his owner Henri Duclos. The names of Jean-Jacques's parents, as well as their region of origin in Africa, are not known. Most slaves trafficked to Saint-Domingue were from west and central West Africa. He later took the surname Dessalines, after a free man of color who had purchased him.

Working in the sugarcane fields as a laborer, Dessalines rose to the rank of commandeur, or foreman. He worked on Duclos's plantation until he was about 30 years old. Still enslaved, Jean-Jacques was bought by a man with the last name of Dessalines, an affranchi or free man of color, who assigned his own surname to Jean-Jacques. From then on he was called Jean-Jacques Dessalines. Dessalines kept this name after he gained his freedom. He worked for that master for about three years.

When the slave uprising of 1791 began, it spread across the Plaine-du-Nord. This was an area of very large sugar cane plantations, where the mass of enslaved Africans lived and worked. Mortality was so high that French colonial planters continued to buy more enslaved people from Africa during the eighteenth century. Dessalines received his early military training from a woman whose name was either Victoria Montou or Akbaraya Tòya.

== Family ==
Dessalines was married to Marie-Claire Heureuse Félicité Bonheur from the city of Léogâne. The wedding celebration took place in St-Marc Church and Toussaint Louverture was the witness. Marie-Claire was empress under the 1805 Constitution, and she has been credited with the concoction of the soup lendepandans or Pumpkin Independence Soup, now a UNESCO Patrimoine. She was older than her husband and died when she was 100 years old. She was referred to as the adopted wife of the Nation in a letter by Pétion after the Emperor's assassination. The couple had or adopted a total number of 16 children including Jacques' from the previous relationship. Innocent, one of his sons, has a fort named in his honor. Dessalines offered one of his daughters to Pétion in an attempt to relieve racial tensions, as Pétion was the most prominent mulatto figure, but Pétion refused under the pretext that she was in a relationship with Chancy, one of Toussaint's nephews.

Euphémie Daguilh, one of his best known concubines, was the choreographer of the Karabiyen dance known also as Jacques' favorite dance. It is still danced by Haitian families all over the country. Dessalines had two brothers, Louis and Joseph Duclos, who also later took the surname Dessalines. Two of his brothers' sons became high-ranking members of the post-Revolutionary Haitian government.

== Revolution ==
=== Ending slavery ===
In 1791, along with thousands of other enslaved persons, Jean-Jacques Dessalines joined the slave rebellion of the northern plains led by Jean François Papillon and Georges Biassou. This rebellion was the first action of what would become the Haitian Revolution. Dessalines became a lieutenant in Papillon's army and followed him to Santo Domingo, occupying the eastern half of the island, where he enlisted to serve Spain's military forces against the French colony of Saint-Domingue. During that period, Dessalines met the rising military commander Toussaint Bréda (later known as Toussaint Louverture), a mature man also born into slavery. He was fighting with Spanish forces on Hispaniola. These men wanted above all to defeat slavery. In 1794, after the French declared an end to slavery as a result of the French Revolution, Toussaint Louverture switched allegiances to the French. He fought for the French Republic against both the Spanish and British, who were trying to get control of the lucrative colony of Saint-Domingue. Dessalines followed, becoming a chief lieutenant to Toussaint Louverture and rising to the rank of brigadier general by 1799.

Dessalines commanded many successful engagements, including the captures of Jacmel, Petit-Goâve, Miragoâne and Anse-à-Veau. In 1801, Dessalines quickly ended an insurrection in the north led by Louverture's nephew, General Moyse. Dessalines gained a reputation for his "take no prisoners" policy, and for burning homes and entire villages to the ground.

The rebellious slaves were able to restore most of Saint-Domingue to France, with Louverture in control. The French initially appointed him as governor-general of the colony. Louverture wanted Saint-Domingue to have more autonomy. He directed the creation of a new constitution to establish that, as well as rules for how the colony would operate under freedom. He also named himself governor-for-life, while still swearing his loyalty to France.

The French government had been through changes after the Revolution and was by then led by Napoleon Bonaparte. His wife, Josephine de Beauharnais, was from a slave-owning family. But many white and mulatto planters had been lobbying the government to reimpose slavery in Saint-Domingue. Napoleon was committed to restoring slavery in Saint-Domingue in an effort to restore the basis of the labor to cultivate and process the great sugar crops. Saint-Domingue generated the highest profits of any of the French colonies prior to the Revolution in 1791.

=== Resisting the Leclerc campaign ===
The French dispatched an expeditionary force in 1802 to restore French rule to the island, an army and ships led by General Charles Leclerc. Louverture and Dessalines fought against the invading French forces, with Dessalines fighting them at the battle for which he is most famous, Crête-à-Pierrot.

During the 11 March 1802 battle, Dessalines and his 1,300 men defended a small fort against 18,000 attackers. To inspire his troops at the start of the battle, he waved a lit torch near an open powder keg and declared that he would blow the fort up should the French break through. The defenders inflicted extensive casualties on the attacking army, but after a 20-day siege, they were forced to abandon the fort due to a shortage of food and munitions. The rebels forced their way through the enemy lines and into the Cahos Mountains, with their army still largely intact.

The French soldiers under Leclerc were accompanied by mulatto troops led by Alexandre Pétion and André Rigaud, free gens de couleur from Saint-Domingue. Pétion and Rigaud, both sons of wealthy white fathers, had opposed Louverture's leadership. They had tried to establish separate government in the south of Saint-Domingue, where the gens de couleur owned the majority of the colony's coffee plantations. Louverture and Dessalines and driven them from the island three years earlier.

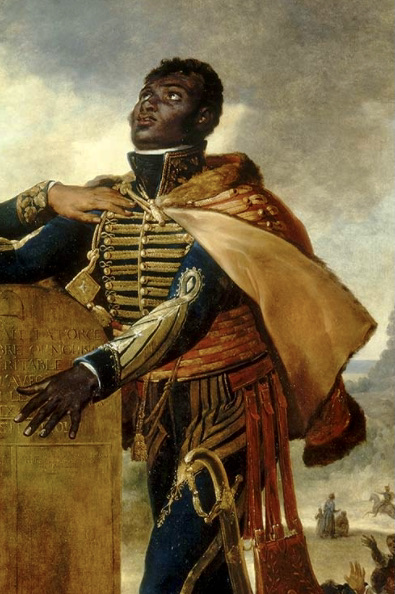
A posthumous depiction of Dessalines in The Oath of the Ancestors (1822)

After the Battle of Crête-à-Pierrot, Dessalines defected from his long-time ally Louverture and briefly sided with Leclerc, Pétion, and Rigaud. Several historians attribute Dessalines with being at least partially responsible for Louverture's arrest, as did Louverture's son Isaac. On 22 May 1802, after Dessalines "learned that Louverture had failed to instruct a local rebel leader to lay down his arms per the recent ceasefire agreement, he immediately wrote Leclerc to denounce Louverture's conduct as 'extraordinary'." For this action, Dessalines and his spouse received gifts from Jean Baptiste Brunet. Louverture and a hundred members of his inner circle were arrested by Brunett on 7 June 1802, and deported to France. Louverture was imprisoned at Fort-de-Joux in Doubs, where he died on 7 April 1803, at the age of 59.

When it became apparent that the French intended to re-establish slavery on Saint-Domingue, as they had on Guadeloupe, Dessalines and Pétion switched sides again in October 1802, to oppose the French. By November 1802, Dessalines had become the leader of the alliance with the blessing of Pétion, the most prominent of the affranchis, or free men of color. Leclerc died of yellow fever, which also killed many of the French troops under his command. The brutal tactics of Leclerc's successor, Donatien de Rochambeau, helped to unify rebel forces against the French.

The rebels achieved a series of victories, culminating in the last major battle of the revolution, the Battle of Vertières. On 18 November 1803, black and mulatto forces under Dessalines and Pétion attacked the fort of Vertières, held by Rochambeau, near Cap-Français in the north. Rochambeau and his troops surrendered the next day. On 4 December 1803, the French colonial army of Napoleon Bonaparte surrendered its last remaining territory to Dessalines's forces. This officially ended the only slave rebellion in world history which successfully established an independent nation.

In the process, Dessalines became arguably the most successful military commander in Haiti's struggle against Napoleonic France. Dessalines promulgated the Declaration of Independence in 1804, and declared himself emperor.

== Emperor of independent Haiti ==
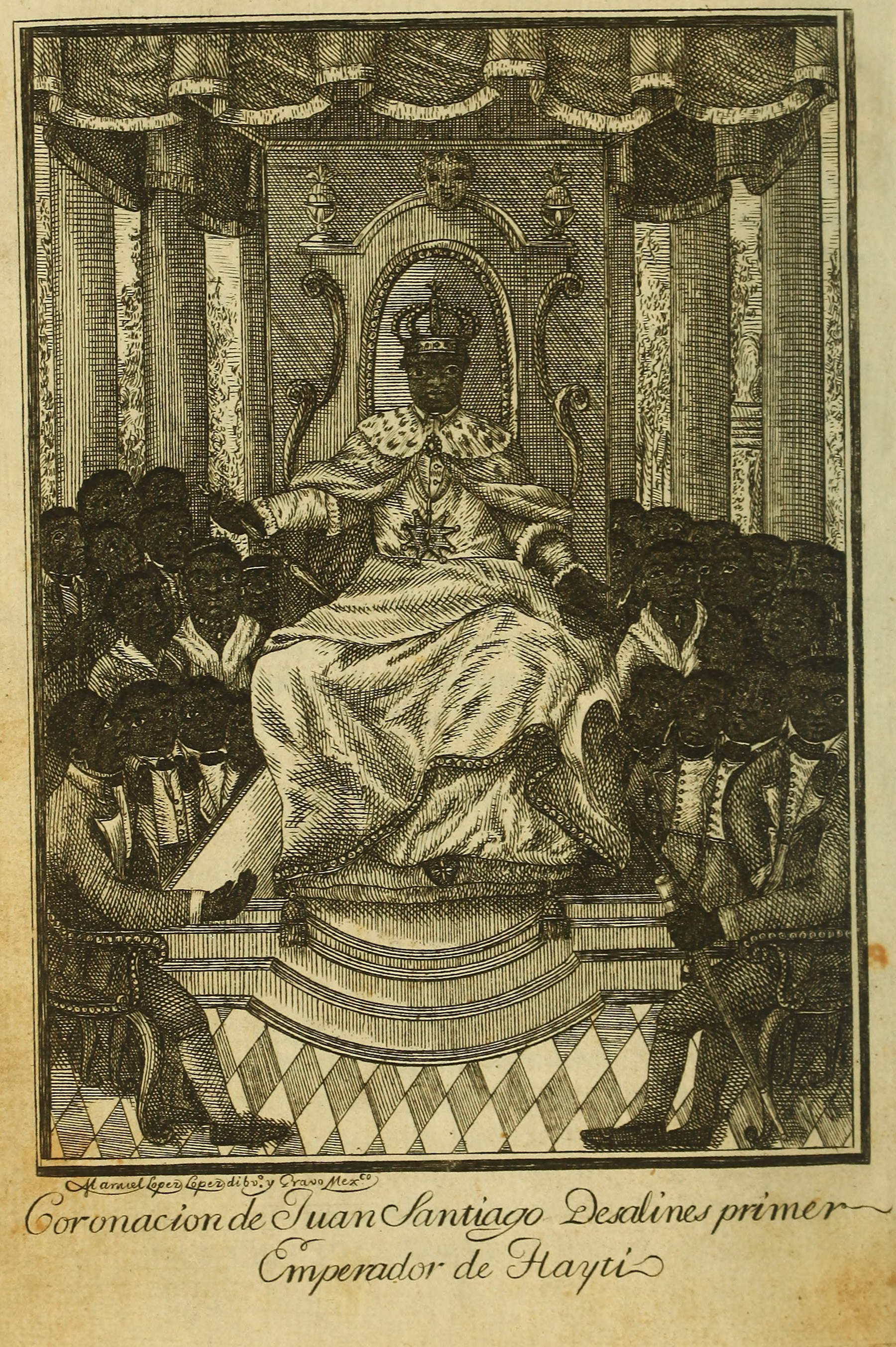
Dessalines' coronation

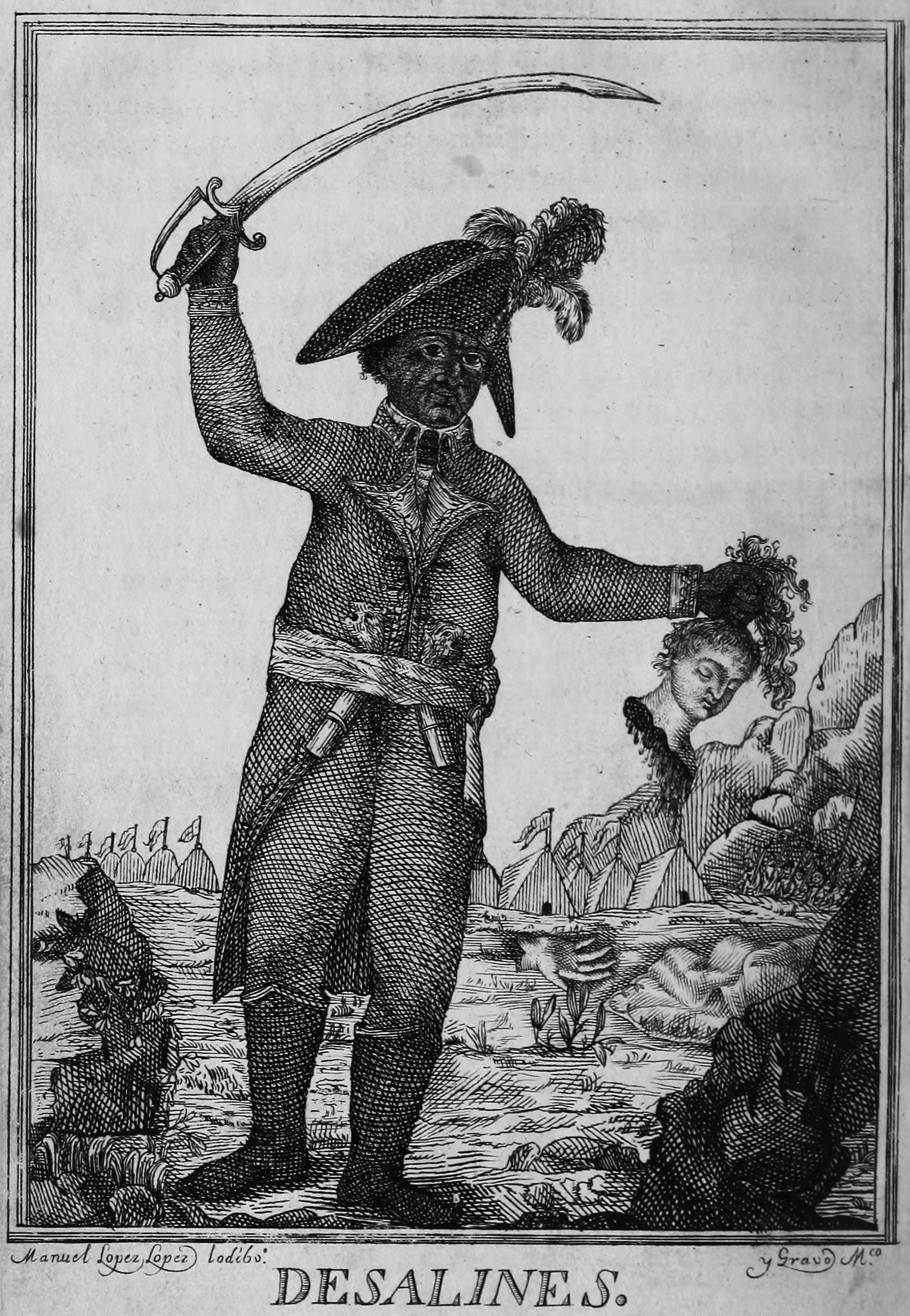
Dessalines holding a white woman's head

On 1 January 1804, from the city of Gonaïves, Dessalines officially declared the former colony's independence and renamed it "Ayiti" after the indigenous Taíno name. He had served as Governor-General of Saint-Domingue since 30 November 1803. After the declaration of independence, Dessalines named himself Governor-General-for-life of Haiti and served in that role until 22 September 1804, when he was proclaimed Emperor of Haiti by the generals of the Haitian Revolutionary army. He was crowned Emperor Jacques I in a coronation ceremony on 6 October in the city of Le Cap (now Cap-Haïtien). On 20 May 1805, his government released the imperial constitution, naming Jean-Jacques Dessalines emperor for life with the right to name his successor.

In 1805, after crowning himself Emperor, Jean-Jacques Dessalines invaded the eastern part of the island, reaching Santo Domingo before retreating in the face of a French naval squadron. As Emperor, Dessalines enforced plantation labor to promote the economy and began a dictatorship. He disappointed many nouveaux libres—the newly freed 80% of the population—who felt his rule evoked the slavery they had faced before the revolution. Anciens libres—those freed before the revolution, often mulattoes—were angered by his plans to reallocate land to the nouveaux. As well, high-ranking military officials began to object to his rule.

=== Abolition of slavery ===
In declaring Haiti an independent country, Dessalines also confirmed the abolition of slavery, making Haiti the first country in the Americas to permanently abolish slavery. After being enslaved for 30 years and witnessing many attrocities, Dessalines did not trust the colonialists. Many white colonialist planters and merchants, in addition to free people of color, had already fled the island as refugees to Cuba, the United States, and France. Between February and April 1804, Dessalines ordered a massacre of the remaining colonists in Haiti, an event that came to be called the 1804 Haitian massacre. In the Haitian Constitution of 1805, Dessalines declared Haiti to be an all-black nation and forbade white colonists from owning property or land there. Property that belonged to white colonists was declared to be "by incontestable right confiscated to the benefit of the state."

=== Economic policies ===
Dessalines enforced a harsh regimen of plantation labor, described by the historian Michel-Rolph Trouillot as caporalisme agraire (agrarian militarism). Like Louverture before him, Dessalines demanded that all blacks work either as soldiers to defend the nation or as laborers on the plantations, in order to continue production of the cash crops that had been the foundation of the colonial economy. His forces were strict in enforcing this policy, to the extent that some blacks felt as if they were again enslaved. Dessalines also believed in the tight regulation of foreign trade, encouraging merchants from Britain and the United States rather than France. Dessalines needed literate and educated officials and managers for his administration, so most of those positions went to the light-skinned elite gens de couleur libres who had been formally educated by their white plantion owner families.

== Death ==
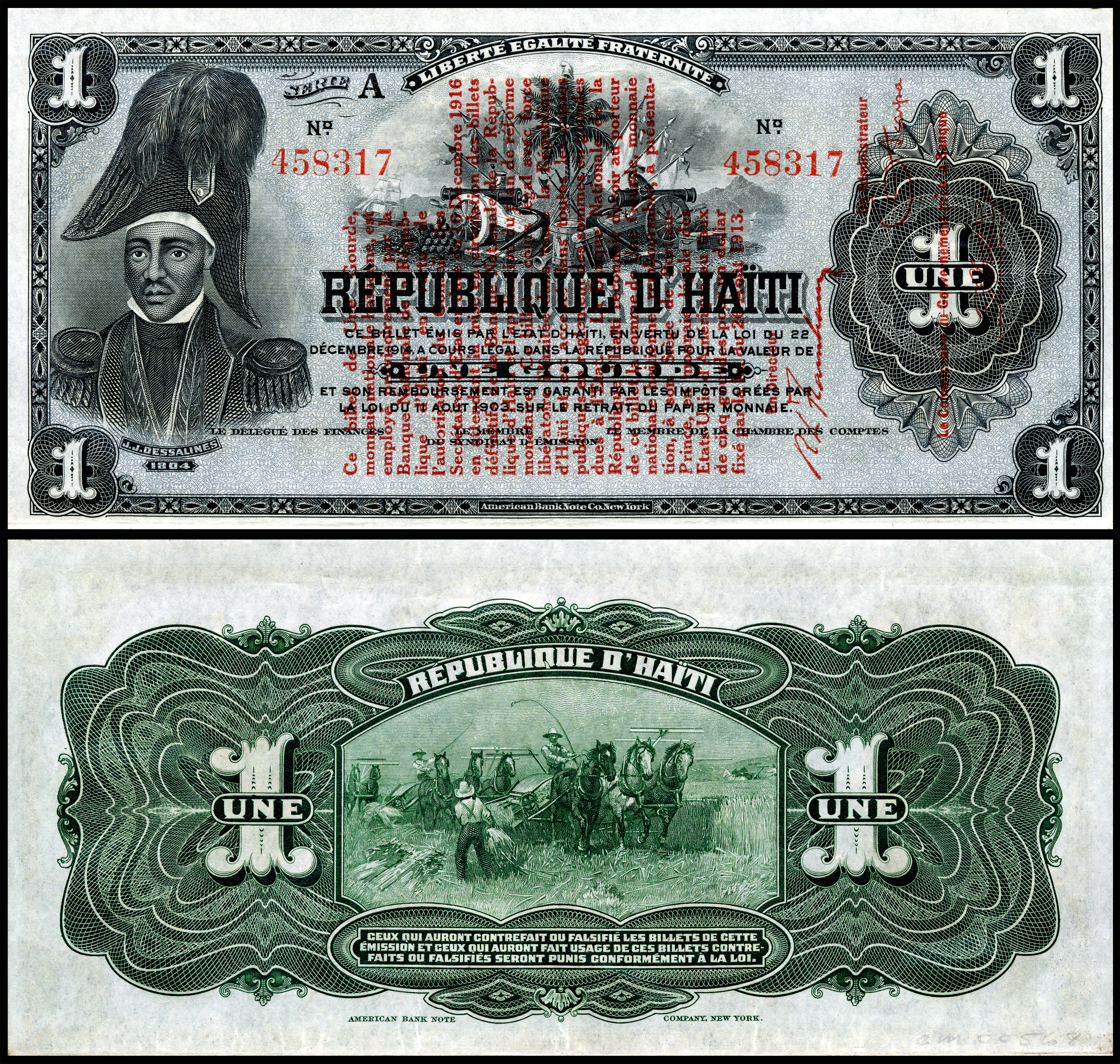
Dessalines depicted on a 1916 Banque Nationale de la République 1 gourde note (1916)

Disaffected members of Dessalines's administration, including Alexandre Pétion and Étienne-Élie Gérin, began a conspiracy to overthrow the Emperor, and Haitians began an insurrection in the south in August 1806, which culminated in Dessalines being assassinated north of the capital city, Port-au-Prince, at Larnage (now known as Pont-Rouge), on 17 October 1806, on his way to fight the rebels. While Henri Christophe is frequently assumed to have participated in the assassination plot as well, this is based on his acceptance of the leadership of the government that emerged in the wake of Dessalines's assassination and not grounded in historical evidence tying him to the plot.

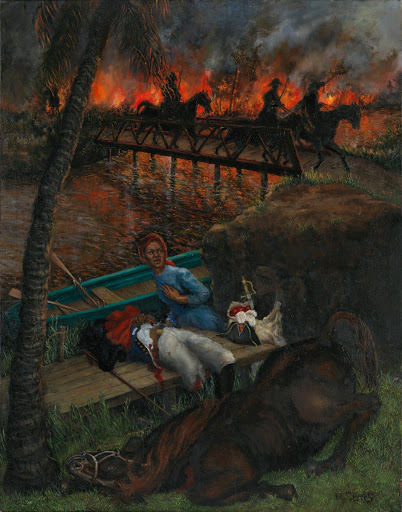
A depiction of Dessalines’s corpse after he was killed

The exact circumstances of Dessalines's death are uncertain. Some historians claim that he was killed at Pétion's house at Rue l'Enterrement, after a meeting to negotiate the power and the future of the young nation. One report say that Dessalines was shot, stabbed, stripped, and had his fingers cut off, before his corpse was brought to Port-au-Prince, where it was stoned by crowds and said to resemble "scraps" and "shapeless remains". Some reports say that he was arrested and was dealt a deadly blow to the head. Another report says he was ambushed and killed at first fire. Yet another account recalls a brutal attack on Dessalines by his own men; it says that after being shot, his head was split open by a sabre's blow and he was finally stabbed three times with a dagger, with the crowd shouting "the tyrant is killed". Most reports confirm that a mob dismembered Dessalines's body in a public square after he was killed.

Multiple modern sources state that there was resistance to providing Dessalines with a proper burial after his assassination, but a vivandière named Dédée Bazile gathered the mutilated corpse of the Emperor and buried it in the Cimetière intérieur of Church Ste-Anne. A tomb was raised by Balthazar Inginac's wife with the inscription: Ci-git Dessalines, mort à 48 ans ("Here lies Dessalines, died at 48 years old"). Dessalines's body was later moved to the Autel de la Patrie (Altar of the Nation) in the Champs-de-Mars alongside Pétion's body. A monument at the northern entrance of the Haitian capital marks the place where the Emperor was killed.

This assassination did not solve the tensions within the Haitian government. His murder left a power vacuum and civil war ensued. Pétion and Christophe temporarily partitioned Haiti between them, with Pétion controlling the South, where there were more gens de couleur libre.

== Family ==
Several of Dessalines's relatives also had leadership roles:

- His nephew Raymond, son of his brother Louis, became Maréchal de Camp Monsieur Raymond Dessalines, created 1st Baron de Louis Dessalines on 8 April 1811. He served as an aide-de-camp to King Henry I, privy councillor, and secretary-general of the Ministry of War between 1811 and 1820. He was a member of the Royal Chamber of Public Instruction between 1818 and 1820; he received the degree of Knight of the Order of St. Henry on 1 May 1811. He was killed by revolutionaries at Cap-Henri on 10 October 1820.
- His nephew Joseph, son of his brother of the same name, became Maréchal de Camp Monsieur Dessalines, created 1st Baron de Joseph Dessalines in 1816. He served as chamberlain to Prince Jacques-Victor Henry, the Prince Royal of Haiti, and major of the Grenadiers de la Garde. He received the degree of Knight of the Order of St. Henry on 28 October 1815.
- His grandson Florvil Hyppolite was president of Haiti from 1889 to 1896.

== Legacy ==
By the beginning of the 20th century, Dessalines began to be reassessed as an icon of Haitian nationalism. The national anthem of Haiti, "La Dessalinienne", written in 1903, is named in his honor.

The main street in Port-au-Prince (Grande-Rue) was renamed Boulevard Jean-Jacques-Dessalines in his honor. It is the main commercial in the downtown area going from the north part to the south part. Many streets, avenues, and boulevards in Haiti carry the name of Dessalines, Jean-Jacques, or Jacques 1st. There are statues of him in Port-au-Prince, Gonaïves, Cap-Haïtien, many other cities in Haiti.

== See also ==
- François Duvalier
- List of slaves

== Bibliography ==
- Braziel, Jana Evans (2005). "Re-membering Defilee: Dedee Bazile as Revolutionary Lieu de Memoire". Small Axe. 9 (2): 57–85. doi:10.1353/smx.2005.0014.
- Dayan, Joan (1998). Haiti, History, and the Gods. University of California Press. ISBN 978-0-520-21368-5.
- Jenson, Deborah. Beyond the Slave Narrative: politics, sex, and manuscripts in the Haitian revolution. Liverpool: Liverpool University Press, 2011.
- Girard, Philippe R. (2011). The Slaves Who Defeated Napoleon: Toussaint Louverture and the Haitian War of Independence 1801–1804. Tuscaloosa, Alabama: The University of Alabama Press. ISBN 978-0-8173-1732-4.
- Knight, Franklin W.; Gates Jr., Henry Louis, eds. (2016). "Défilée, Dédée Bazile (c. 1730s–1810s)". Dictionary of Caribbean and Afro–Latin American Biography. Oxford University Press. ISBN 978-0-19-993580-2.
- Lamour, Sabine (March 2022). "The Political Project of Marie Sainte Dédée Bazile (Défilée): Reappropriating This Heritage to Build the Present". Journal of Haitian Studies. 28 (1): 62–81. doi:10.1353/jhs.2022.0001. JSTOR 27211681.
- Schutt-Ainé, Patricia (1994). Haiti: A Basic Reference Book. Miami, Florida: Librairie Au Service de la Culture. pp. 33–35, 60. ISBN 0-9638599-0-0.
- TiCam (27 September 2006). "17 October: Death of Dessalines". haitiwebs.com. Archived from the original on 28 September 2007.

Jean-Jacques Dessalines House of Dessalines Born: 20 September 1758 Died: 17 October 1806
Regnal titles
New title Empire established	Emperor of Haiti; 22 September 1804 – 17 October 1806	Vacant Title next held by Faustin I
Political offices
Preceded by Napoléon I of France as First Consul of France	Head of State of Haiti; 22 September 1804 – 17 October 1806	Succeeded by Henri I as President of the State of Haiti, later King of Haiti
