= Gonâve Island =

Island in Haiti

La Gonâve
Native name: Guanabo
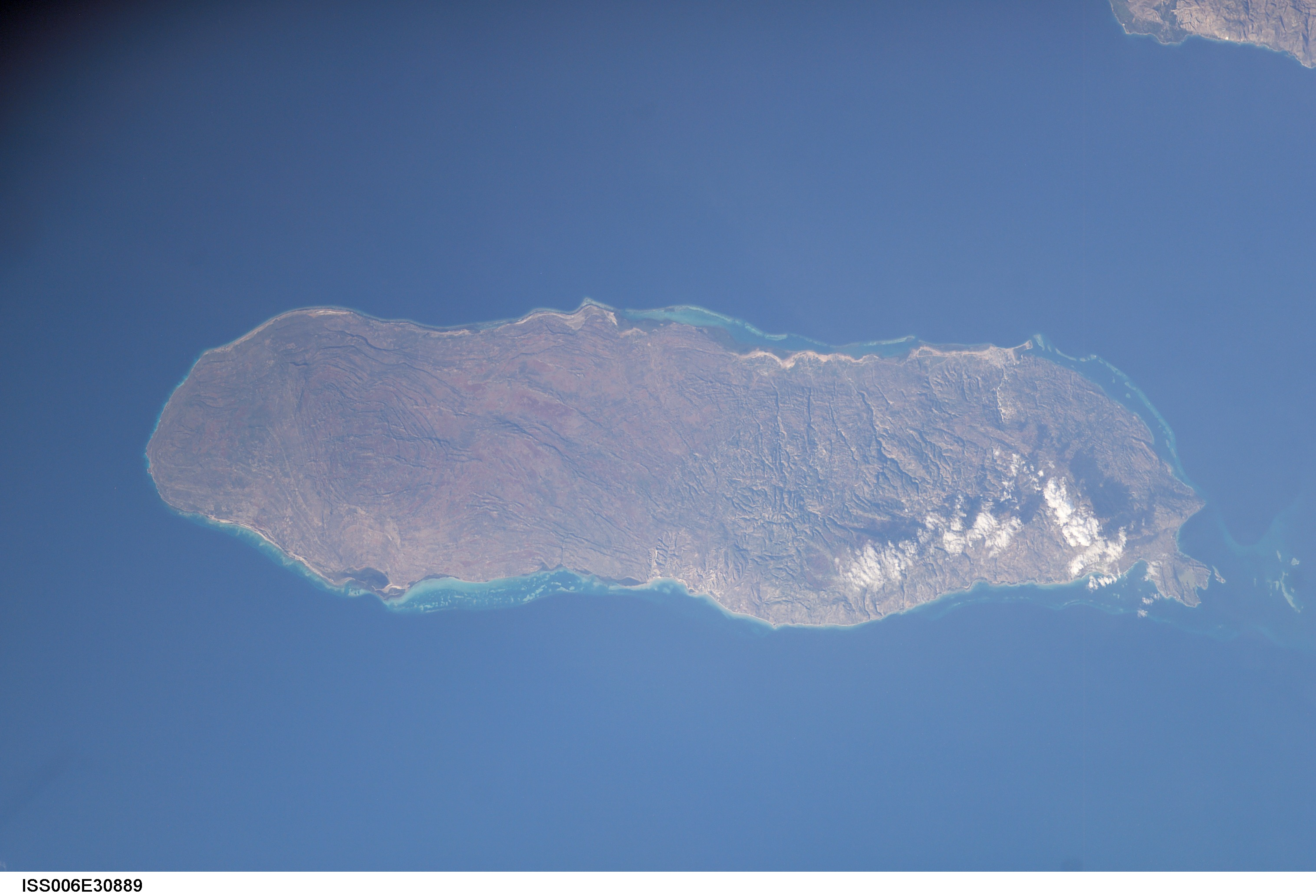
- View of Gonâve Island from space

- Location within Haiti

Geography
- Location: Gulf of Gonâve
- Coordinates: 18°50′N 73°05′W
- Area: 689.62 km^{2} (266.26 sq mi)
- Highest elevation: 778 m (2552 ft)
- Highest point: Morne La Pierre

Administration
- Haiti
- Department: Ouest
- Largest settlement: Anse-à-Galets (pop. 49,050)

Demographics
- Demonym: Gonâvians
- Population: 87,077 (2015)
- Pop. density: 126/km^{2} (326/sq mi)
- Pointe Fantasque Lighthouse
- Foundation: concrete base
- Construction: metal skeletal tower
- Height: 15 m (49 ft)
- Shape: square pyramidal tower with balcony and light
- Markings: white tower
- Power source: solar power
- Focal height: 20 m (66 ft)
- Range: 9 nmi (17 km; 10 mi)
- Characteristic: Q(6)+LFI W 15s

Gonâve Island or Zile Lagonav (French: Île de la Gonâve, pronounced [ɡɔ.nɑv]; also La Gonâve) is an island of Haiti located west-northwest of Port-au-Prince in the Gulf of Gonâve. It is the largest of the Hispaniolan satellite islands. The island is an arrondissement (Arrondissement de La Gonâve) or Ouest-Insulaire in the Ouest and includes the communes of Anse-à-Galets and Pointe-à-Raquette.

== History ==
=== European period ===
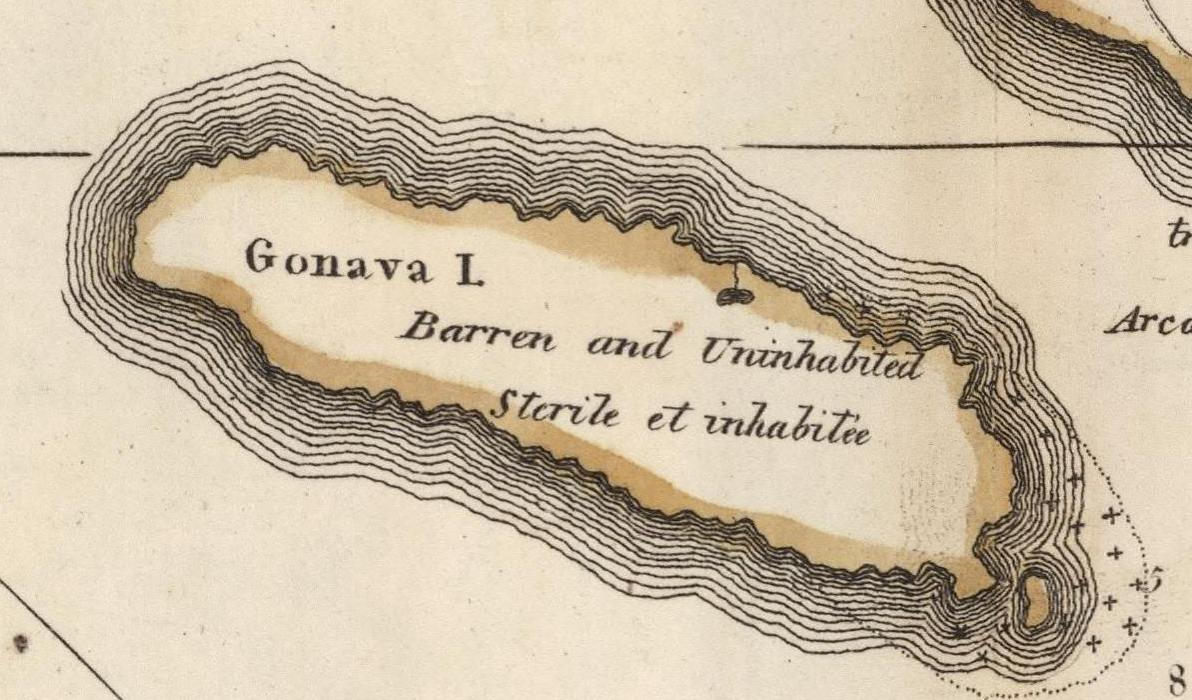
1818 Map of Gonâve Island

No major French or Spanish settlement was built in La Gonâve. During the colonial period, the island was uninhabited by colonists, which led the indigenous Taínos to seek refuge there after early battles with the Spanish. Runaway slaves in the French period, too, sometimes sought out the island for a place to hide from their owners on the mainland.

=== Haitian period ===
The island has been officially under Haitian control since Toussaint Louverture and the Constitution of 1801.

=== Kingdom of La Gonâve ===
The Kingdom of La Gonâve was an informal, locally recognized system of leadership on La Gonâve. The island was governed by a matriarchal system of "societies" and queens, and although they were never formally recognized by the Haitian government, they governed La Gonâve independent of Haiti. In 1926, during the United States occupation of Haiti, U.S. Marine Sergeant Faustin E. Wirkus secured Queen Ti Memenne’s release from charges related to vodou practice.

In gratitude, Queen Ti Memenne proclaimed Wirkus as "King Faustin II" on 18 July 1926 in a vodou ceremony near the hounfour (vodou temple) in Anse-à-Galets, believing him to be the reincarnation of Emperor of Haiti Faustin Soulouque, due to both his sharing the same name and his securing her release from prison. From 1926 until 1929, both Queen Ti Memenne and King Wirkus reigned as co-rulers of La Gonâve, until Wirkus was reassigned by the U.S. Marine Corps.

Queen Ti Memenne died in 1934, five years after Wirkus left La Gonâve. The Haitian government attempted to integrate the island into the rest of Haiti, but Queen Ti Memenne's cousin Julie was proclaimed as queen; she was the last sovereign of La Gonâve, and it is unknown when her reign ended.

=== Modern period ===
In the mid-1980s, British singer Cliff Richard wrote and recorded the song "La Gonave" for relief aid for the people of the island. It is included on his album The Rock Connection.

The island's docks were damaged by the 2010 Haiti earthquake on 12 January. In the wake of the damage, supplies were airlifted in to the 550-metre (1,800 ft) dirt strip.

In 2025, two men (Gavin Weissenberg of Allen, Texas, and Tanner Thomas of Argyle) from Texas were indicted on charges of conspiracy to murder, maim, or kidnap in a foreign country. Prosecutors claimed they were planning to recruit homeless people to help them take over Gonâve Island by force, so they could kill the men and use the women and children as sex slaves. The men had reportedly begun learning Haitian Creole in order to prepare.

=== Independence movement ===
The island inhabitants have pushed the idea of independence from Haiti in order to achieve economic prosperity.

== Geography ==
Gonâve as seen in 2026

The island sits in the middle of the Gulf of Gonave, south of St-Marc, north of Miragoanes, and west of Port-au-Prince. It forms the canal of St-Marc with the Cote des Arcadins and the Canal of the South and Miragoanes.

Made up of mostly limestone, the reef-fringed island of Gonâve is 60 km (37 mi) long and 15 km (9 mi) wide and covers an area of 743 km^{2} (287 sq mi). The island is mostly barren and hilly with the highest point reaching 778 m (2,552 ft). The island receives between 800 mm (31 in) to 1,600 mm (63 in) of rain a year, higher elevations representing the latter figure.

The barren, dry nature of the soil has long prevented agricultural development on the island and kept the population lower than it otherwise might have been.

== Administrative division ==
La Gonâve arrondissement is divided into two communes: Anse-à-Galets and Pointe-à-Raquette. These are further subdivided into eleven sections and two towns (villes). The towns are Anse-à-Galets and Pointe-à-Raquette, named after their respective communes. Anse-à-Galets is the largest settlement on the island with an estimated 2015 population of 52,662 of the island's total population of 87,077.

Anse-à-Galets	Pointe-à-Raquette
1st Palma	5th Gros Mangle
2nd Petite Source	6th La Source
3rd Grande Source	7th Grand Vide
4th Grand Lagon	8th Trou Louis
10th Picmy (Pickmy)	9th Pointe-à-Raquette
11th Petite Anse	

== Water scarcity ==
In 2005, following a particularly drastic drought, the Mayor of Anse-à-Galets formed the Water Platform, composed of service groups working on the island. Current participants include the Mayors of Anse-à-Galets and Pointes a Racquette, the Deputy, Justice of the Peace, World Vision, Concern WorldWide, Sevis Kretyen, the Matènwa Community Learning Center, the Alleghany Weslyen Church, the Methodist Church, Haiti Outreach and many others. The Water Platform acts as a focal point for activities on the island, providing a coordination point for the multitude of groups working on La Gonâve.

=== Assistance efforts ===
The members of the Water Platform have been working to address the water needs of the island by capping springs, building rainwater catchment cisterns, building water systems and drilling wells. Dozens of rainwater catchment cisterns and wells have been drilled on the island as an effort to bring water relief to the residents of the island.

2002–2004 Guts Church funded construction of a school providing first through sixth grade education and construction of a medical clinic providing free medical, dental, and vision services for Haitians.

As of 2007, there were two non-profit groups actively drilling water wells on the island: Haiti Outreach, which has financed and drilled water wells in 25 communities; and Guts Church in Tulsa, Oklahoma. The Tougher Than Hell Motorcycle Rally, organized by Guts Church, has sponsored 10 water wells drilled on the island.

In 2010 Coordinated relief efforts after the 12 January earthquake. $250,000 was raised for this relief project. Medical supplies, building supplies, 150 tons of rice and beans and a backhoe were purchased. Aid was shipped to La Gonâve via a leased vessel and delivered directly to La Gonâve in early March 2010. The aid shipment fed 50,000 people for one month.

As of 2011 there are over 70 water wells fully functional on the island. The drilling of more wells on the island has been planned for the near future.

== Ferry disaster ==
On 8 September 1997, the passenger ferry La Fierte Gonavienne (The Pride of Gonave) operating from La Gonâve to the Montrouis on the Haitian mainland sank with hundreds of passengers aboard. It is unknown how many died; some estimate that about 290 people were killed. Others think up to 250 with 60 surviving. It is considered the worst disaster in Haitian maritime history since the Neptune accident in 1993.

== Media ==
- Radio Zetwa 89.1 Fm

== Sports team ==
- Roulado FC – professional football club

== Notable natives and residents ==
- Faustin E. Wirkus – King of La Gonâve (Faustin II)
- Ti Memenne of La Gonâve – Queen of La Gonâve

== See also ==
- List of lighthouses in Haiti
