= Faustin Soulouque =

President and emperor of Haiti (1782–1867)

Faustin I
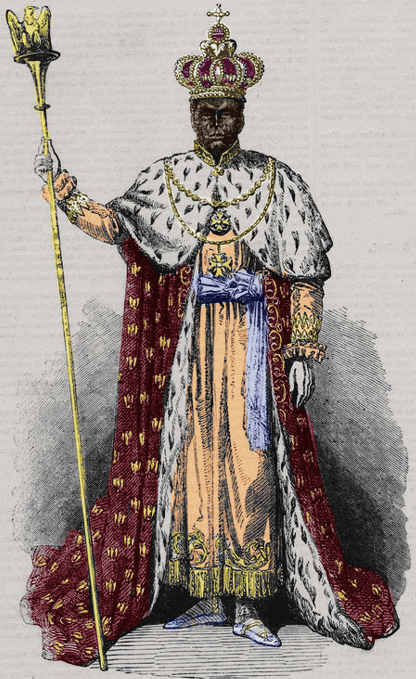
- 1856 illustration

Emperor of Haiti
- Reign: 26 August 1849 – 15 January 1859
- Coronation: 18 April 1852
- Predecessor: Himself (as President of Haiti)
- Successor: Monarchy abolished Fabre Geffrard (as President of Haiti)

7th President of Haiti
- In office: 1 March 1847 – 26 August 1849
- Predecessor: Jean-Baptiste Riché
- Successor: Himself (as Emperor of Haiti)
- Born: 15 August 1782; Petit-Goâve, Saint-Domingue
- Died: 3 August 1867 (aged 84); Anse-à-Veau, Haiti
- Spouse: Adélina Lévêque (m. 1847)
- Issue: Princess Olive; Princess Célita
Names
- Faustin-Élie Soulouque
- House: Soulouque
- Father: Unknown
- Mother: Marie-Catherine Soulouque
- Coat of arms

Faustin-Élie Soulouque (French pronunciation: [fostɛ̃ eli suluk]; 15 August 1782 – 3 August 1867) was a Haitian politician and military officer who served as President of Haiti from 1847 to 1849 and Emperor of Haiti from 1849 to 1859.

Soulouque was a general in the Haitian Army when he was appointed President of Haiti. He acquired autocratic powers, purged the army of the ruling elite, installed black loyalists in administrative positions and the nobility, and created a secret police and private army. Soulouque was an enthusiastic vodouisant, maintaining a staff of bokors and manbos, and gave the stigmatized vodou religion semi-official status which was openly practiced in Port-au-Prince. Soulouque declared the Second Empire of Haiti in 1849 after being proclaimed Emperor under the name Faustin I, and formally crowned in 1852. Several unsuccessful attempts to reconquer the Dominican Republic eroded his support and he abdicated in 1859 under pressure from General Fabre Geffrard. Soulouque was temporarily exiled to Jamaica before returning to Haiti where he died in 1867.

Soulouque was the last Haitian head of state to have participated in the Haitian Revolution, the last to have been born prior to independence, the last ex-slave and the last to officially style himself as a monarch.

== Early years ==
Faustin-Élie Soulouque was born on 15 August 1782 in Petit-Goâve, a small town in the French colony of Saint-Domingue, to a Haitian mother. Soulouque's mother, Marie-Catherine Soulouque, was born in Port-au-Prince in 1744, and was a creole of ethnic Mandinka descent. Soulouque was freed as a result of a 1793 emancipation decree issued by Léger-Félicité Sonthonax, the Civil Commissioner of Saint-Domingue during the French Revolution, that abolished slavery in response to the Haitian Revolution that started in 1791.

Soulouque enlisted in the black revolutionary army in 1803 as a free citizen, as his freedom was in serious jeopardy due to attempts of the French government to re-establish slavery. Soulouque fought as a private until 1804, when the conflict ended in revolutionary victory and Saint-Domingue achieved independence as Haïti. Soulouque became a respected soldier during the conflict, and as a consequence he was commissioned as a lieutenant in the Haitian Army in 1806, and made aide-de-camp to General Lamarre.

In 1810, Soulouque was appointed to the Horse Guards under President Alexandre Pétion, and for the next four decades continued to serve in the Haitian military, rising to the rank of colonel under President Philippe Guerrier. Soulouque was finally promoted to the highest command in the Haitian Army, attaining the rank of lieutenant general and Supreme Commander of the Presidential Guards under then-President Jean-Baptiste Riché.

== Reign ==
In 1847, President Riché died, and during his tenure he had acted as a figurehead for the Boyerist ruling class, who immediately began to look for a replacement. Their attention quickly focused on Soulouque, whom the majority of the Boyerists considered to be a somewhat dull and ignorant man who seemed to be a malleable candidate. Soulouque, aged sixty five years-old, was subsequently enticed to accept the role offered him as Haiti's 7th President, taking the Presidential Oath of Office on 2 March 1847.

At first Soulouque seemed to fill the role of puppet well, retaining the cabinet-level ministers of the former president and continued the programs of his predecessor. However, within a short time, Soulouque surprisingly rejected his backers and began to consolidate himself as the absolute ruler of Haiti. According to the book A Continent of Islands: Searching for the Caribbean Destiny by Mark Kurlansky: "He organized a private militia, the Zinglins, and proceeded to arrest, kill, and burn out anyone who opposed him, especially mulattoes, thus consolidating his power over the government". Soulouque's power consolidation saw an increase in racial discrimination in favor of Haiti's black population, including a massacre of the mulattoes in Port-au-Prince on 16 April 1848. Blacks from Louisiana were invited by Soulouque to emigrate to Haiti at the country's expense and the Haitian-educated Emile Desdunes, a Creole of color from New Orleans, acted as an agent for Soulouque to arrange free transportation to Haiti in 1859 for at least 350 desperate evacuees. A large number of these migrants later returned to Louisiana. Soulouque placed heavy restrictions towards all opposition, and a wave of violence used against potential rivals led to numerous murders. His open adherence to Vodou, a highly stigmatized syncretic religion, contributed to his violent reputation in the predominantly Roman Catholic country. Soulouque maintained a resident staff of manbos (high priestesses) and bokors (male witches) at his residence in Port-au-Prince.

== Coronation ==
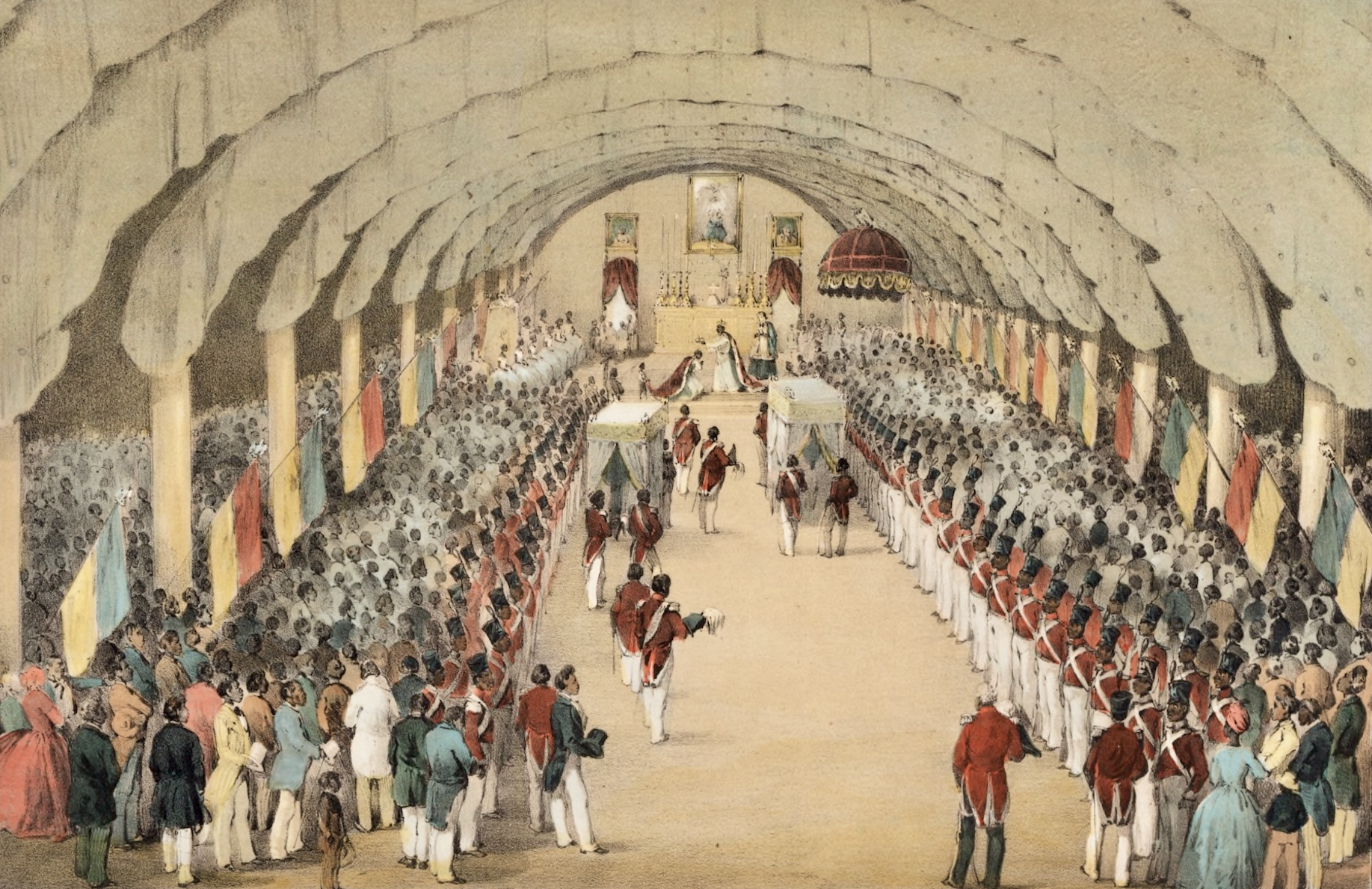
The coronation of Faustin I, 18 April 1852

Soulouque's process of obtaining absolute power in Haiti culminated in the formation of the Second Empire of Haiti after the Senate and Chamber of Deputies proclaimed him Emperor of Haiti on 26 August 1849, re-establishing the Haitian empire that had been abolished in 1806 following the assassination of Jean-Jacques Dessalines, who reigned as Emperor Jacques I of the First Empire of Haiti (another monarchy, the Kingdom of Haiti of Henri Christophe, existed in 1811–1820). Soulouque paid £2,000 for his crown, and spent £30,000 for the rest of the accessories (according to Sir Spenser St John, British charge d'affaires in Haiti during the 1860s in his account: Hayti, or, The Black Republic, pp. 95–96). Gustave d’Alaux describes this event in his book, Soulouque and his Empire: "His Imperial Majesty had the principal merchant of Port-au-Prince called one morning and commanded him to order immediately from Paris a costume, in every particular like that he admired in representing the ceremonies of the coronation of Napoleon. Faustin I besides ordered for himself a crown, one for the Empress, a sceptre, globe, hand-of-justice, throne, and all other accessories, all to be like those used in the coronation of Napoleon.".

In December 1849, Faustin married his long-time companion Adélina Lévêque. On 18 April 1852 at Port-au-Prince, both Emperor and Empress were crowned in an immense and lavish ceremony in emulation of the coronation of Napoleon. The president of the Senate attached to the breast of the Emperor a large decoration, passed a chain about the neck of the Empress – and pronounced his address, to which His Majesty Faustin replied with spirit: "Vive la liberté, vive l'égalité!” (Gustave d’Alaux). The coronation is illustrated in the Album Impérial d'Haïti, engraved by Severyn, published New York, 1852 (available in the British Library).

== Nobility ==
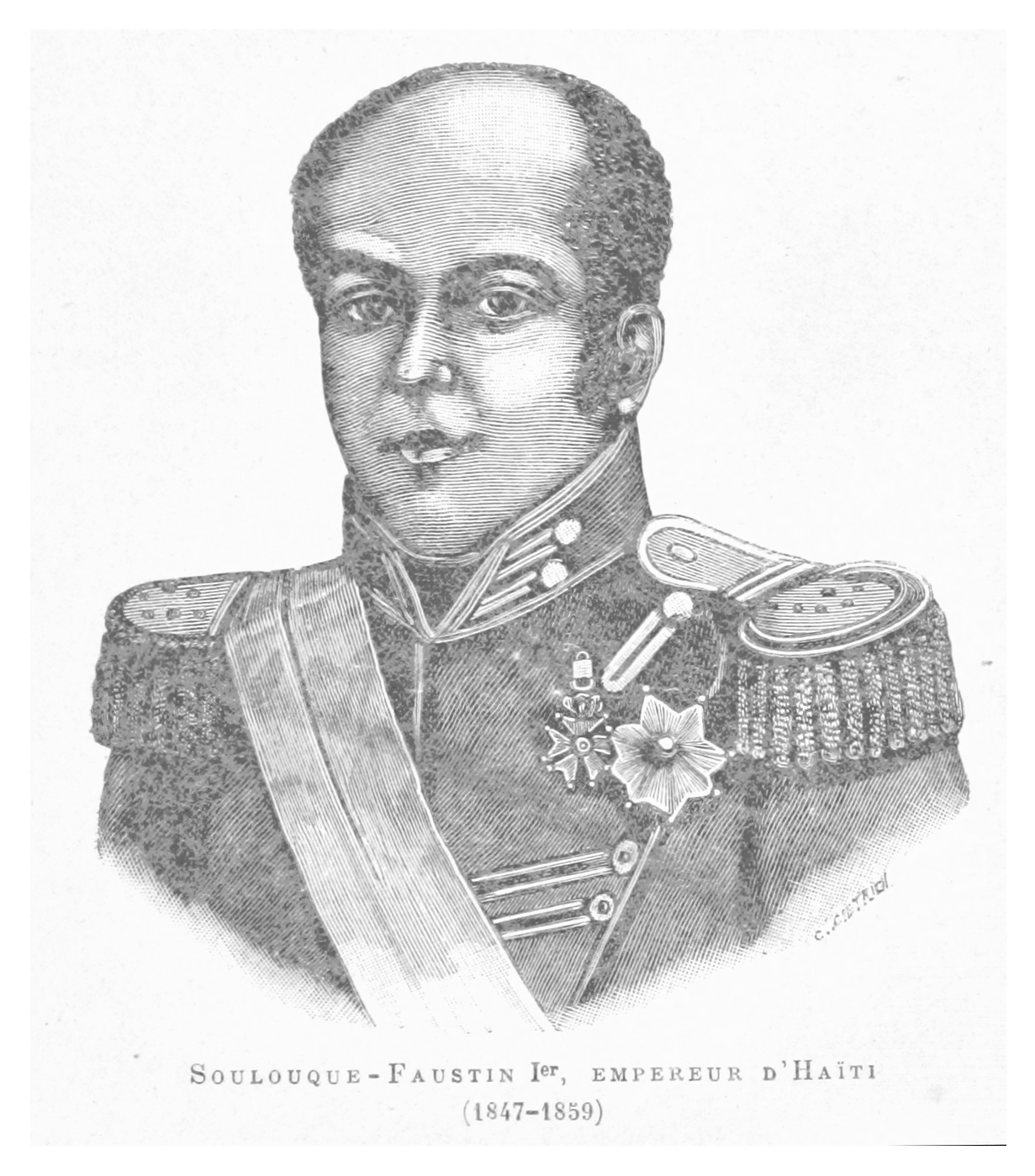
Engraving of Faustin (1892)

Soulouque attempted to create a strong centralized government while retaining a profoundly Haitian character, but borrowed heavily from European traditions, especially those of the First French Empire. One of his first acts after being declared emperor was to establish a Haitian nobility. The Constitution of 20 September 1849 granted the Emperor the right to create hereditary titles and confer other honours on his subjects. Volumes 5 and 6 of John Saunders and Westland Marston's The National magazine (published in 1859) stated the empire consisted of 4 princes, 59 dukes, 90 earls, 30 lady knights (but no male knights), 250 barons, and 2 marchionesses. The first letters patents were issued by Soulouque on 21 December 1850. Other sources add "trent cent Chevaliers" and "quatre cents nobles" to this list. Subsequent creations extended the number of noble titles, including titles issued by King Henri Christophe of the Kingdom of Haiti were sometimes reissued by Soulouque. An example was the title of Comte du Terrier-Rouge was issued to Charles Pierre under Christophe (The Armorial of Haiti, College of Arms, London 2007, p. 78) and the same title was issued under Soulouque on behalf of General Guerrier de Prophete (Java-Bode 5 August 1857). In order that he might reward loyalty to his regime as well as add to the prestige of the Haitian monarchy, Soulouque established the Military Order of St. Faustin and the Civil Order of the Haitian Legion of Honor on 21 September 1849. Later, he created the Orders of St. Mary Magdalene and the Order of St. Anne in 1856. That same year he founded the Imperial Academy of Arts.

== Politics ==
Soulouque's foreign policy was centered on preventing foreign intrusion into Haitian politics and sovereignty. His main issue was the Dominican Republic, whose independence from Haiti in 1844 after the Dominican War of Independence ended 22-years of Haitian occupation. The Dominican Republic's white and mulatto rulers were considered as his "natural" enemies and the country's independence was, in his view, a direct threat to Haiti's security. In 1849, Soulouque launched his first invasion of the Dominican Republic, but his army fled after 400 Dominicans put up resistance at Ocoa. A second invasion followed in 1850 which was checked by diplomatic opposition from the United Kingdom, France, and the United States. In the third and final invasion in 1855, Soulouque marched into the Dominican Republic at the head of a 30,000-man army which fled after suffering heavy losses in Santomé, Cambronal and Sabana Larga.

Soulouque also found himself in direct confrontation with the United States over Navassa Island, which had been seized from Haiti on the somewhat dubious grounds that guano had been discovered there. Soulouque dispatched warships to the island in response to the incursion, but withdrew them after the United States guaranteed Haiti a portion of the revenues from the mining operations.

The question of who Soulouque really was is heavily disputed. Virtually no official government records of cabinet meetings exists. According to Latin American scholar Murdo J. MacLeod: "We are left with his policies as they are discernible, with an assessment of the men whom he used to govern, and with our evaluation of how correct his appreciation of the situation really was. In every case we must conclude that Faustin Soulouque was a man of high intelligence, a realist, a pragmatist, and a superb, if ruthless politician and diplomat. There is no denying his patriotism and his ability to impose domestic tranquility."

=== Known ministers ===
- Louis Dufresne (general of the army, minister of war, the navy and foreign relations)
- Jean-Baptiste Francisque (minister of justice, worship and public education)
- Lysius Salomon (Finance, Commerce and Foreign Relations)

== Line of succession ==
Soulouque's marriage to Empress Adélina produced two daughters, Olive and Célita. They were granted the title of Princess with the style Her Serene Highness. Célita married Jean Philippe Lubin, Count of Pétion-Ville, and had issue. The emperor had one brother, Prince Jean-Joseph Soulouque, who in turn had eleven sons and daughters.

The Constitution of 20 September 1849 made the Imperial Dignity hereditary amongst the natural and legitimate direct descendants of Emperor Faustin I, by order of primogeniture and to the perpetual exclusion of females. The Emperor could adopt the children or grandchildren of his brothers, and become members of his family from the date of adoption. Sons so adopted enjoyed the right of succession to the throne, immediately after the Emperor's natural and legitimate sons.

Jean-Joseph's eldest son, Prince Mainville-Joseph Soulouque, was created Prince Imperial of Haiti and heir apparent upon the succession of his uncle to the throne. His marriage to Marie d'Albert produced a daughter, Marie Adelina Soulouque "princesse impériale d'Haiti".

== Exile and death ==
In 1858, a revolution against Soulouque was led by General Fabre Geffrard, Duc de Tabara, and in December of that year, Geffrard defeated Soulouque's army and seized control of most of Haiti. On the night of 20 December 1858, Soulouque left Port-au-Prince in a small boat, accompanied only by his son and two trusty followers, Ernest Roumain and Jean-Bart, and two days later arrived at Gonaives, where the insurrection broke out. The Republic of Haiti was re-proclaimed and the Constitution of 1846 was adopted.

On 23 December, the Departmental Committee which had been organized, divested Faustin Soulouque of his office and appointed Fabre Geffrard President of Haiti. Cap-Haitien and the whole Department of Artibonite joined in the restoration of the Republic. As a result, Soulouque abdicated his throne on 15 January 1859. Refused aid by the French Legation, Soulouque was taken into exile aboard a British warship on 22 January 1859.

Soon afterwards, Soulouque and his family arrived in Kingston, Jamaica, where they remained for several years. Some records claim that he died in Kingston, but according to Haitian historian Jacques Nicolas Léger in his book Haiti, her History and her Detractors, Soulouque actually died in Petit-Goave in August 1867, having returned to Haiti at some point.

== See also ==
- Crown of Faustin I
- Monarchies in the Americas
- Second Empire of Haiti

== Footnotes ==
Political offices
Preceded by Jean-Baptiste Riché	President of Haiti; 1847–1849	Vacant Title next held by Fabre Geffrard
Regnal titles
Vacant Title last held by Jacques I	Emperor of Haiti; 1849–1859	Vacant Republic declared
