= List of wars involving Haiti =

This is a list of wars involving Haiti.

Haitian victory
Haitian defeat
Another result (e.g. a treaty or peace without a clear result, status quo ante bellum, result of civil war or internal conflict, result unknown, mixed results, stalemate, ceasefire or indecisive)
Ongoing conflict

== List ==
| Conflict | Combatant 1 | Combatant 2 | Result |
|---|---|---|---|
| Haitian Revolution (1791–1804) | 1791–1793: St. Dominican Rebels; Spain (from 1793); St. Dominican Royalists; 1793–1798: French Republic; 1798–1801: Louverture Loyalists; 1802–1804: Armée Indigène; United Kingdom | 1791–1793: Kingdom of France (until 1792); French Republic; 1793–1798: Spain (until 1795); St. Dominican Royalists; 1798–1801: Rigaud Loyalists; 1802–1804: France; Great Britain (1793–1798) | Haitian victory: Reprisal massacres against French population; Haitian independence; Subsequent establishment of the Empire of Haiti |
| War of the South (1799–1800) | (France) Pro-Toussaint forces Naval support: United States | (France) Pro-Rigaud forces | Pro-Toussaint victory: Toussaint assumes control of the entirety of Saint-Domingue; Rigaud & mixed-race officers flee into exile; Reprisals & massacres against Rigaud supporters |
| Saint-Domingue expedition (1801–1803) | Indigenous Army; United Kingdom | France: Polish Legions | Rebel victory: Haitian independence; Subsequent establishment of the Empire of Haiti |
| Franco-Haitian War (1805) | Haiti | France | French victory: Haitian withdrawal from Eastern Hispaniola following the Siege of Santo Domingo; Beheadings of Moca |
| Revolution of 1806 | Empire of Haiti | Republican forces | Revolutionary victory: Jean-Jacques Dessalines assassinated at Pont-Rouge; Anti-Dessalines coalition takes power; Provisional government established under presidency of Henri Christophe |
| Haitian Civil War (1806–1820) | Republic of Haiti | 1806–1807 Pro-Christophe forces 1807–1811 State of Haiti: Grand'Anse rebels; 1811–1820 Kingdom of Haiti: Grand'Anse rebels; Department of the South (1810–1812) | Republican victory: Reunification of Haiti; Death of Henri Christophe and his heir Jacques-Victor Henry; Suppression of the Grand'Anse rebellion; Death of Goman |
| Spanish American wars of independence (1808–1833) | Patriots; Supported by: United Kingdom (1815–1819); United States (1810–1819); Haiti; Indigenous allies | Royalists; Spain; Supported by: Russian Empire; Indigenous allies | Patriot victory: Diplomatic recognition in 1821 (Portugal), 1822 (US), and 1825 (UK).; Spain retained the islands of Cuba and Puerto Rico until the Spanish–American War of 1898.; Banda Oriental and Spanish Texas become part of the United Kingdom of Portugal, Brazil and the Algarves and First Mexican Empire respectively. |
| Action of 3 February 1812 (1812) | Department of the South | United Kingdom | British victory: British capture of the L'Heureuse Réunion; Death of captain Gaspard |
| Venezuelan War of Independence (1816–1823) | Patriots 1816–1819: Venezuela; Haiti 1819–1823: Gran Colombia | (Spanish Empire) Royalists Spain: (Spain) Supreme Junta; (Spain) Governorate of Venezuela; (Spain) Governorate of Colombia | Patriot victory: Independence of the Captaincy General of Venezuela; Venezuela becomes a part of Gran Colombia |
| Greek Revolution (1821–1829) | Greek Revolutionaries In detail: Klephts; Armatoloi; Filiki Eteria (Note: Only in 1821); Sacred Band; Messenian Senate; Peloponnesian Senate (Note: From 1821–1823.); Senate of Western Continental Greece; Areopagus of Eastern Continental Greece; Temporary regime of Crete; Military-Political System of Samos; After 1822: First Hellenic Republic; Military support: (First Hellenic Republic) Philhellenes; Carbonari revolutionaries; Serbian revolutionaries; Romanian revolutionaries (Note: From 1821.); Russian Empire (Note: From 1826.); Kingdom of France; United Kingdom; Diplomatic support: Haiti (Note: Haiti was the first nation to recognize the independence of Greece.); United States | Ottoman Empire Supported by: Egypt; Regency of Algiers; Tripolitania; Tunis; Danubian Sich | Greek victory (Note: London Protocol (1830), London Conference (1832), Treaty of Constantinople (1832)): Independence of Greece; The Peloponnese, Saronic Islands, Cyclades, Sporades and Continental Greece ceded to the independent Greek state; Crete ceded to Egypt |
| Dominican War of Independence (1844–1856) | Republic of Haiti (1844–1849); Second Empire of Haiti (1854–1856) | Dominican Republic | Dominican victory: Dominican Independence; Withdrawal of Haitian forces; Separation of the Santo Domingo territory from Haiti; Reestablishment of the Dominican–Haitian border; Establishment of the First Republic; Dominican control of the larger east side of Hispaniola |
| Revolution of 1843 | Republic of Haiti | Pro-Hérard forces | Revolutionary victory: Resignation and exile of Jean-Pierre Boyer; Charles Rivière-Hérard assumes the Haitian presidency |
| Revolution of 1844 | Republic of Haiti | Pro-Guerrier forces 'Army of the Sufferers'; Grand'Anse Rebels | Revolutionary victory: Resignation and exile of Charles Rivière-Hérard; Philippe Guerrier assumes the Haitian presidency |
| Nippes rebellion (1846) | Republic of Haiti | Nippes rebels | Government victory: Defeat of the rebel forces at Fort Saint-Laurent; Death of Louis Jean-Jacques Acaau |
| Revolution of 1858 | Second Empire of Haiti | Republican forces | Revolutionary victory: Fall of the Second Empire of Haiti; Abdication and exile of Faustin I; Proclamation of a reconstituted Republic of Haiti under the 1846 constitution; Fabre Geffrard assumes the Haitian presidency |
| Insurrection of 1865 | Republic of Haiti; Supported by: United Kingdom | Pro-Salnave forces | Government victory: Rebel troops crushed at Cap-Haïtien; British naval intervention against the insurrection; Sylvain Salnave flees on-board the De Soto |
| Haitian Civil War (1867–1869) | Republic of Haiti | Septentrional Republic; Meridional Republic; Cacos | Rebel victory: End of the Salnave presidency; Sylvain Salnave is tried and executed after a flight attempt; Jean-Nicolas Nissage Saget assumes the Haitian presidency |
| Liberal insurrection of 1883 | Republic of Haiti | Liberals Cacos | Government victory: Liberals defeated by government forces; Death of Jean-Pierre Boyer-Bazelais; Persecution of opposition to Lysius Salomon's presidency; "The Bloody Week" in Port-au-Prince; Cacos defeated by government forces |
| Revolution of 1887 | Republic of Haiti | Anti-reelectionists | Revolutionary victory: Lysius Salomon resigns and goes into exile; Pierre Théoma Boisrond-Canal appointed to provisional presidency |
| Haitian Civil War (1888–1889) | Pro-Légitime forces | Pro-Thélémaque forces Pro-Hyppolite forces Supported by: United States | Pro-Hyppolite victory: Death of Séide Thélémaque; François Denys Légitime is ousted from the presidency and goes into exile; Florvil Hyppolite assumes the presidency |
| Haitian Civil War (1902) | Republic of Haiti; Supported by: United States; German Empire | Firminists | Government victory: Firminist forces defeated; German intervention leading to the scuttling of the Crète-à-Pierrot; Anténor Firmin flees into exile; Rule of Pierre Théoma Boisrond-Canal and Pierre Nord Alexis secured |
| Revolution of 1908 | Republic of Haiti; Zinglins | Firminists Simonists | Revolutionary victory: Pierre Nord Alexis is ousted and flees into exile; François C. Antoine Simon assumes the presidency; Firminists crushed by government forces; General Jean-Jumeau captured and executed; Anténor Firmin returns into exile |
| Haitian Civil War (1911) | Republic of Haiti | Lecontists Firminists | Lecontist victory: Government forces defeated; Capture of Port-au-Prince; François C. Antoine Simon is ousted and exiled; Cincinnatus Leconte assumes the presidency; Anténor Firmin is exiled |
| Revolution of 1915 | Republic of Haiti | Pro-Bobo forces Cacos | Revolutionary victory: Death of Vilbrun Guillaume Sam; Revolutionary Committee assumes power |
| United States invasion of Haiti (1915) | United States | Republic of Haiti | American victory: United States occupation of Haiti; Philippe Sudré Dartiguenave installed as president; 1918 constitution drafted and imposed by the United States; Government and finances of Haiti fall under United States control; Rosalvo Bobo is sidelined for the presidency and goes into exile |
| First Caco War (1915) | United States; Republic of Haiti | Haitian rebels Cacos | American victory: Caco rebels crushed after the Battle of Fort Rivière; Death of Josaphat Jean-Joseph; Destruction of Fort Rivière and the surrounding area |
| Second Caco War (1918–1920) | United States; Republic of Haiti | Haitian rebels Cacos | American victory: Caco rebels crushed; Assassination of Charlemagne Péralte; Death of Benoît Batraville |
| World War I (1914–1918) | Allied Powers:': France; United Kingdom; and Empire: Australia; Canada; Ceylon; Egypt; Newfoundland; New Zealand; India; South Africa; Russia (until 1917) (Note: The Russian Empire during 1914–1917, the Russian Republic during 1917. The Bolsheviks signed an armistice followed by a separate peace shortly after their armed seizure of power.); Italy (from 1915); United States (from 1917); Japan; Haiti; and others ... | Central Powers: Germany; Austria-Hungary; Ottoman Empire; Bulgaria (from 1915); and others ... | Allied Powers victory (see Aftermath of World War I) |
| World War II (1941–1945) | Allies; Soviet Union; United States; United Kingdom; China; France; Poland; Canada; Australia; New Zealand; India; South Africa; Yugoslavia; Greece; Denmark; Norway; Netherlands; Belgium; Luxembourg; Czechoslovakia; Brazil; Mexico; Ethiopia; Dominican Republic; Haiti | Axis; Germany; Japan; Italy; Hungary; Romania; Bulgaria; Finland; Thailand; Manchukuo; Croatia; Slovakia | Allied victory |
| Operation Uphold Democracy (1994–1995) | Haiti | United States; Argentina; Netherlands; Poland; Belgium Haitian Opposition CARICOM: Antigua and Barbuda; Bahamas; Barbados; Belize; Guyana; Jamaica; Trinidad and Tobago | US-led coalition victory: Military regime removed, Raoul Cédras deposed; Jean-Bertrand Aristide sworn back into office. |
| FLRN Rebellion (2004) | Republic of Haiti | National Revolutionary Front for the Liberation of Haiti United Nations: United States; Chile; Canada; France; Brazil | US-led coalition victory: Aristide ousted; Interim government installed |
| Operation Secure Tomorrow (2004) | United States; France; Canada; Chile; Haiti | Various armed groups | Haitian/US-led coalition victory: State collapse prevented; Start of United Nations Stabilisation Mission in Haiti |
| Haitian conflict (2020–present) | Government of Haiti: Haitian security forces; Haitian National Police; Haitian Armed Forces; MSSMH; Kenya; Jamaica; Belize; Bahamas; Guatemala; El Salvador; Support: United States; Canada; France; Spain; Germany; Mexico; Dominican Republic; Chile; Algeria | Anti-government forces: Viv Ansanm; G9; Delmas 6; Baz Pilate; Baz Krache Dife; Baz Nan Chabon (Waf Jérémie); Nan Boston; G-Pèp; 400 Mawozo; Nan Brooklyn; Chen Mechan; Kraze Baryè; 5 Segond; Gran Ravine; Taliban (Canaan); Mariani; Ti Bwa; Nan Ti Bwa; Simon Pelé; Belekou; Other affiliated groups; Local self-defense forces: Protesters, self-defense groups, and other armed factions; Bwa kale vigilantes; Brigade for the Security of Protected Areas | Ongoing: Ariel Henry resigns as acting prime minister on 24 April 2024; Garry Conille installed as new Prime Minister of Haiti on 3 June 2024; Garry Conille removed as acting prime minister and replaced by Alix Didier Fils-Aimé on 10 November 2024 |
