= List of Haitian flags =

This is a list of flags used in Haiti. For more information about the national flag, visit the article Flag of Haiti.

== National flag ==
Flag	Date	Use	Description
	1986–present	Flag of Haiti	A horizontal bicolour of blue and red, charged with the coat of arms in a small white box in the center.
	1964–1986	Flag of Haiti used by the Duvaliers	The new constitution under Duvalier returns to the black and red flag first used by Dessalines, although the coat of arms remains but with color modifications instead of the blue, with black.
	1820–1849, 1859–1964	Flag of the Unification of Hispaniola and Flag of the Republic of Haiti (1859–1964)	The bicolour flag of 1804, reverted to use by Alexandre Pétion to represent the Republic, while also adopting the coat of arms at the center with the inscription, L'union fait la force (unity makes strength).
	1849–1859	Flag of the Second Empire of Haiti	An attempt to restore the black and red flag which was made in 1844 failed. In 1847, Faustin Soulouque was elected president and in 1849 he proclaimed himself Emperor under the name of Faustin I, who kept the blue and red band, but changed the coat of arms with his own in representation of his monarch rule.
	1814–1820	Flag of the Kingdom of Haiti	Flag of the Northern Kingdom, used by Henri Christophe, who proclaimed himself King, under the name of Henri I, who maintained the imperial flag of Dessalines inverting colors of red in the hoist and black in the fly with, in the center, adding a shield with a phoenix under five five-pointed stars, all in gold on a blue background; the shield bore a crown and the Latin inscription, Ex Cinerebus Nascitur.
	1811–1814	Flag of the Kingdom of Haiti	
	1806–1811	Flag of the State of Haiti	Flag of the Northern State, used by President Henri Christophe, who adopted the bicolors from the flag of the Haitian Revolution.
	1804–1806	Flag of the First Empire of Haiti	Flag of the First Empire, used by Jean-Jacques Dessalines who proclaimed himself Emperor under the name of Jacques I. He adopted a new flag on 20 May 1805: the blue band was changed to black to symbolize death (black) and freedom (red).
	1804		The first flag of the Republic. The generals of the revolution decided to change the flag so that the bands are horizontal.
	1803	Revolutionary flag of Saint-Domingue	Jean-Jacques Dessalines, chief of the black rebels, and Alexandre Pétion, leader of the mulattoes, decide in 1803 to stop fighting alongside the French. On May 18, 1803, Dessalines removes the white band from the French flag and has his relative, Catherine Flon, sew together the blue and red bands together to form the first Haitian flag symbolizing the alliance between the blacks and mulattoes. Dessalines orders that the words Liberté ou la mort (Freedom or death), be inscribed on the flag.
	1798–1803	Flag of Saint-Domingue	The tricolour flag of the French First Republic was adopted in 1798 by Toussaint Louverture after the French Revolution.
	1791–1798	Flag of Saint-Domingue	Marquis de Caradeu, with supposed powers from the French Assembly, established his power in the island. His flag was "used for all the nation."
	1625–1790	Flag of Saint-Domingue	The crown represents the Kingdom of France.

== Civil flags ==
Flag	Date	Use	Description
	1820–1964, 1986–present	Civil flag	
	1964–1986	Civil flag	

== Military flags ==
Flag	Date	Use	Description
		Haitian Coast Guard ensign	Coast guard ensign based on Haitian colors with Haitian Coast Guard emblem in the canton.
