= Action of 3 February 1812 =

1812 engagement of the Napoleonic Wars

Coordinates: 18.525°N 72.677°W

- Part of the Napoleonic Wars
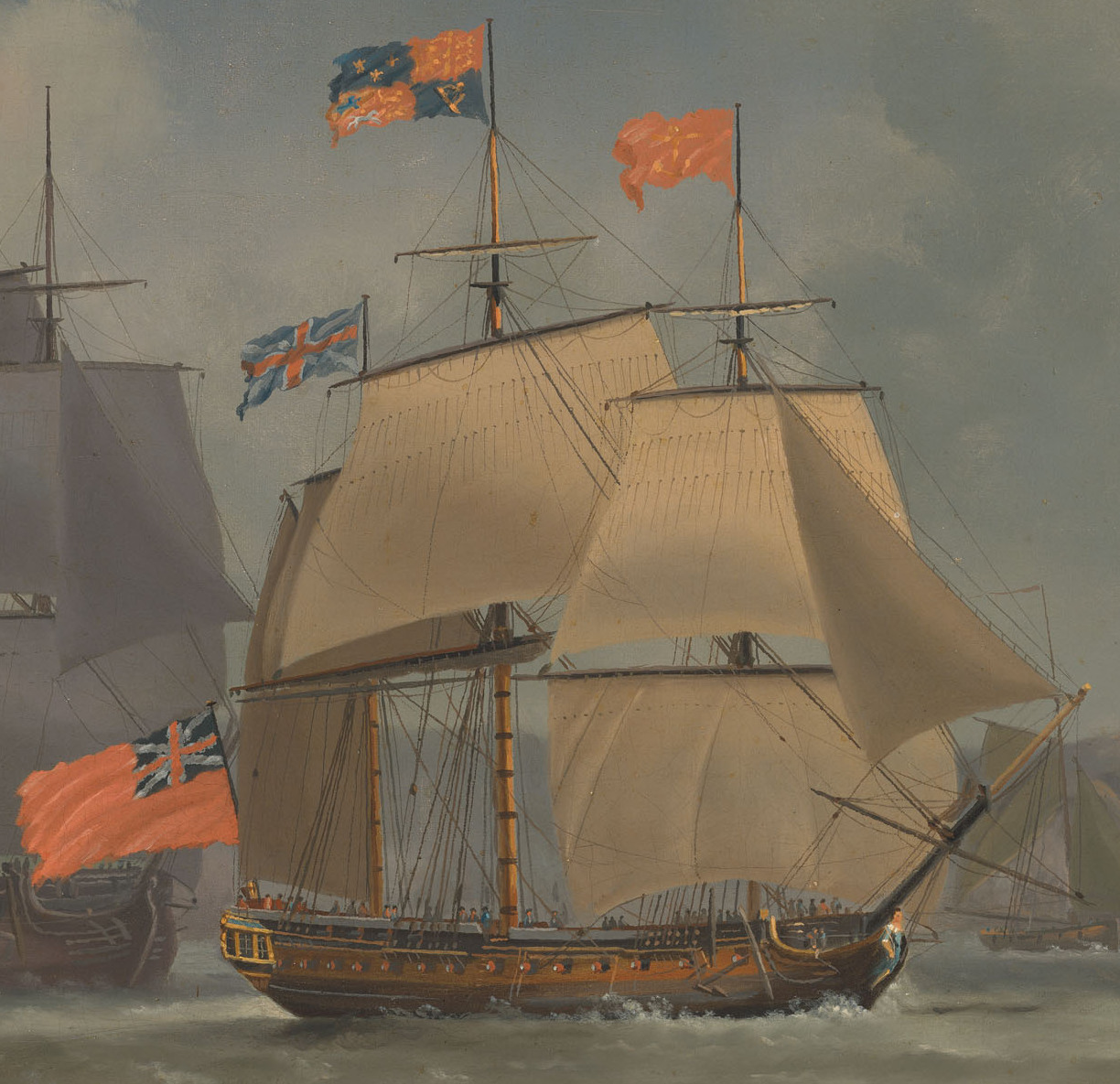
- 1789 painting of HMS Southampton
Date	3 February 1812
Location	Gulf of Gonâve, Caribbean Sea
Result	British victory

Belligerents
United Kingdom	Haiti

Commanders and leaders
James Yeo	Gaspard †

Strength
1 frigate	1 frigate 1 corvette 1 brig

Casualties and losses
1 killed 10 wounded	105 killed 120 wounded 1 frigate captured

The action of 3 February 1812 was a single-ship action fought off the western coast of Haiti between the British Royal Navy and a Haitian warship during the Napoleonic Wars. It was fought against the background of the collapse of the First Empire of Haiti in 1806 after the Haitian Revolution. After Haiti became independent from French colonial rule in 1804, it was first ruled by Jean-Jacques Dessalines, who was assassinated in 1806 and replaced by two of his advisors, Henri Christophe and Alexandre Pétion. They divided the country between them and in the confused political situation that followed a number of minor fiefdoms appeared, including one ruled by warlord Jérôme-Maximilien Borgella in the department of Sud. The small Haitian Navy defected from Christophe to Borgella, who crewed his new ships with sailors from various countries.

In 1812, the British frigate HMS Southampton was stationed off Haiti under Captain Sir James Lucas Yeo, who was tasked with observing Haiti's political situation but was ordered not to interfere in the intermittent conflict between Christophe and Pétion. Yeo's orders did not mention Borgella's ships and Yeo reasoned that the Haitian Navy's flagship, the 44-gun frigate Heureuse Réunion under the command of a French privateer named Gaspard, presented a serious threat to international trade in the region.

Sailing to intercept Heureuse Réunion, Yeo discovered her in the Gulf of Gonâve on 3 February and ordered Gaspard to surrender. He refused to do so, and the two frigates exchanged shots at 06:30. The superior seamanship and discipline on Southampton prevented Gaspard from boarding her with the larger crew under his command, and within half an hour Heureuse Réunion was dismasted and battered. At 07:45 she surrendered, with Yeo depositing the remaining crew ashore and bringing Heureuse Réunion to Port Royal, Jamaica. At Jamaica, his actions were approved by his superiors and Heureuse Réunion, renamed Améthyste, was returned to Christophe by the British.

== Background ==
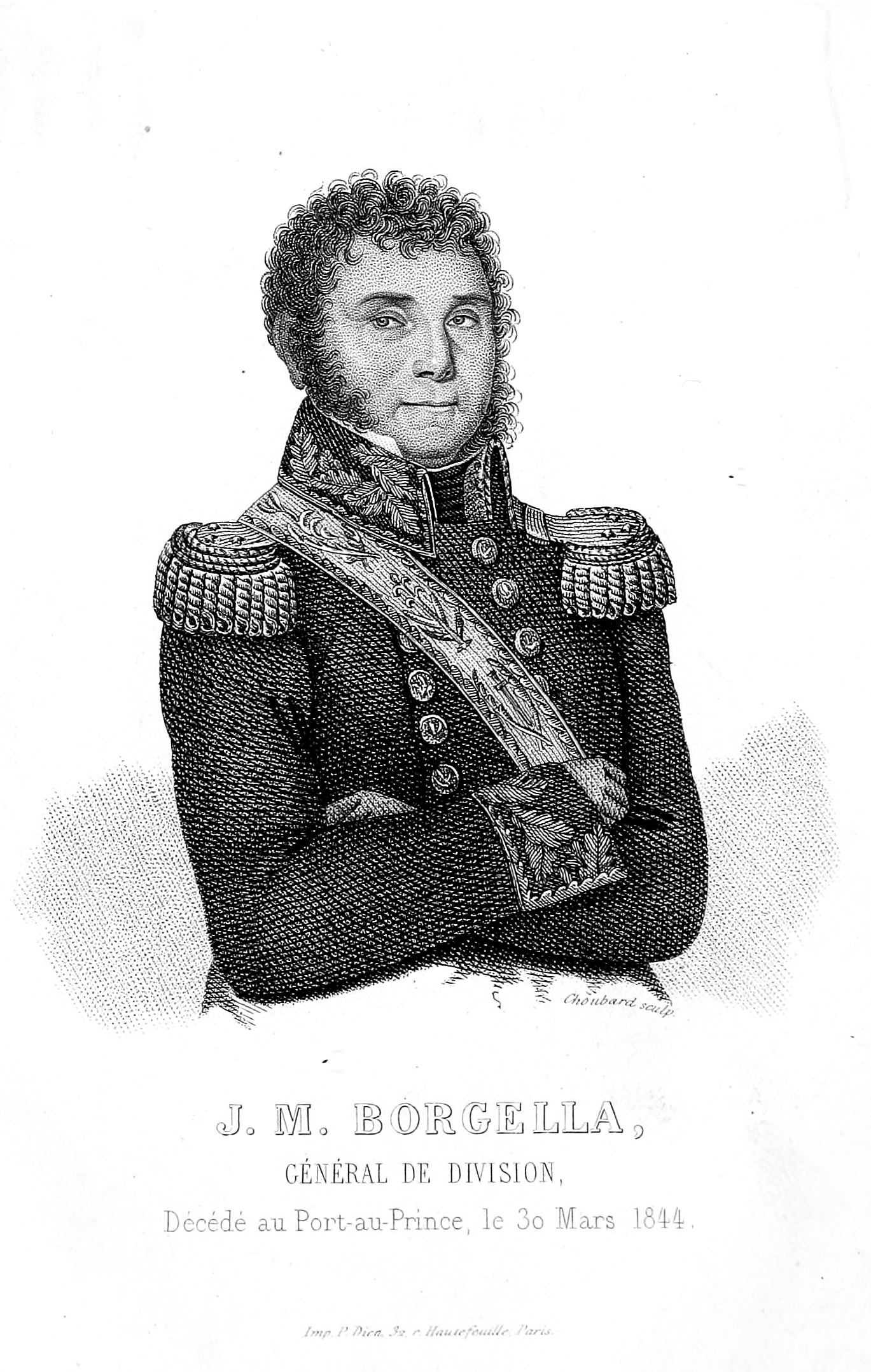
1853 portrait of Borgella

During the French Revolutionary and Napoleonic Wars, the West Indies was important theatre of conflict between the various European powers in the region. However, the Caribbean campaign of 1803–1810 resulted in British forces capturing all French, Dutch and Danish colonies in the West Indies, which eliminated the threat they posed to British interests and led to a corresponding reduction in the Royal Navy presence in the Caribbean. Remaining British warships focused on monitoring regional trouble spots, including the newly independent nation of Haiti, which had declared independence from France in 1804.

Haiti had formerly been the French colony of Saint-Domingue, which was plunged into chaos after a 1791 slave rebellion. Years of confused fighting followed between different factions, though by 1803 Black rebels under Jean-Jacques Dessalines, aided by a British blockade of Saint-Domingue, pushed out the last French troops out from the colony and declared their independence as the First Empire of Haiti. Dessalines declared himself emperor, but his reign abruptly ended when he was assassinated in 1806 on the orders of his subordinates Henri Christophe and Alexandre Pétion. Haiti proceeded to be divided into two rival states: the State of Haiti under Christophe and the Republic of Haiti under Pétion, resulting in a low-intensity conflict between the two.

This division fostered the rise of regional warlords, particularly in southern Haiti, where Pétion distributed land to subordinates who established semi-autonomous fiefdoms. One such subordinate was Jérôme-Maximilien Borgella, who assumed control of the Sud department following the death of André Rigaud on 18 September 1811. Meanwhile, in early 1809 the French attempted to reinforce their remaining Caribbean colonies with several convoys, though most were intercepted by the British. Among them was a squadron under Counter-admiral Amable Troude, which reached the Îles des Saintes in April 1809.

Intending to resupply the last French colony in the region, Guadeloupe, Troude attempted to evade a British blockading squadron under Vice-admiral Sir Alexander Cochrane on 14 April. While two supply-laden frigates, Félicité and Furieuse, made it Basse-Terre, Troude's main squadron was defeated three days later. The two frigates remained at anchor until June, when they attempted to return to France. Félicité was captured without resistance on June 18 by HMS Latona, while Furieuse was taken the following month in the North Atlantic. Deemed too old for British service, Félicité was sold to Christophe and recommissioned as Améthyste, forming the core of the fledgling Haitian Navy.

== Battle ==
At some point in January 1812 the Haitian Navy defected, for reasons unknown, from Christophe to Borgella. Borgella placed a French privateer named Gaspard in command of the squadron, which included Améthyste (renamed Heureuse Réunion), a corvette and a brig. Gaspard then armed Heureuse Réunion with 44 cannon, took on board a motley crew of over 600 men, a mixture of Haitians, Frenchmen, Americans and other nationalities, and began cruising in the Gulf of Gonâve. The British observational warship stationed off Haiti at this time was the frigate HMS Southampton under the command of Captain Sir James Lucas Yeo, who was under strict orders to respect the ships of Christophe and Pétion, but not those of the minor warlords that had emerged along the Haitian coast. On 2 January word reached him at Port au Prince of Gaspard's movements and he immediately sailed to intercept him, concerned that if Gaspard was allowed to take his squadron out of Haitian waters he might begin attacks on merchant ships regardless of nationality.

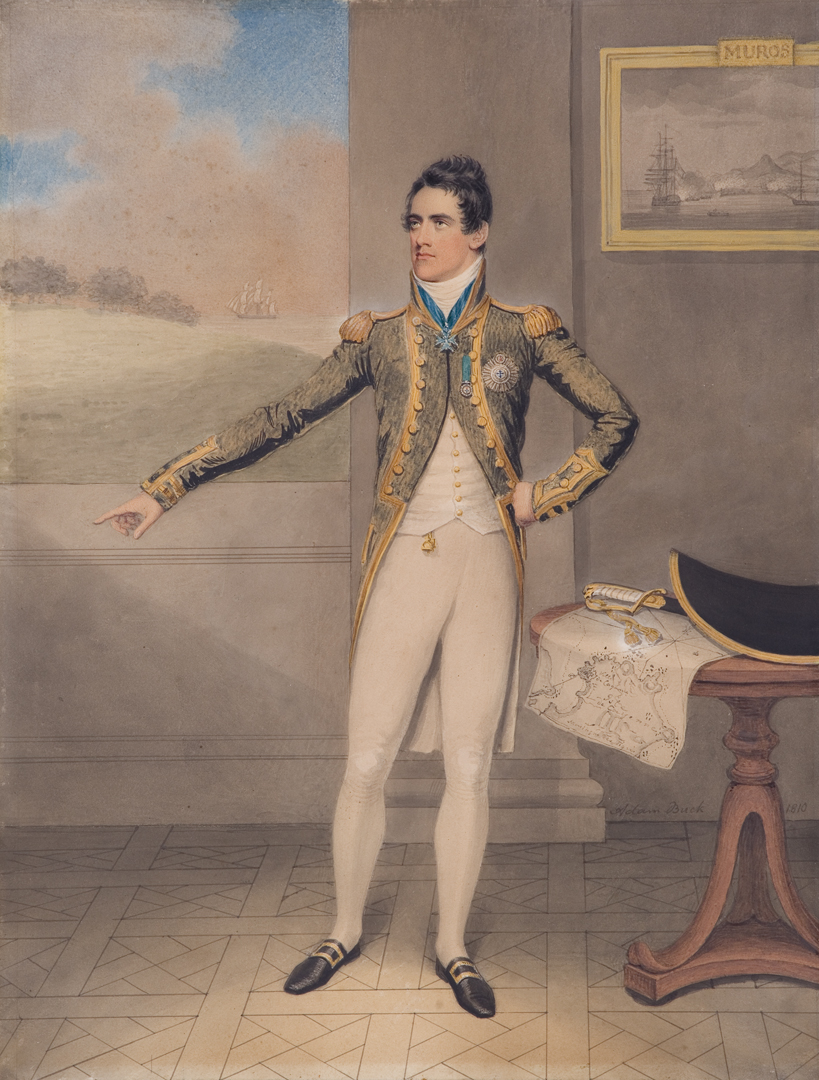
1810 portrait of Yeo by Adam Buck

At 06:00 on 3 February, Yeo discovered Gaspard's ships at anchor to the south of Gonâve Island and demanded that Gaspard come aboard Southampton with his commissioning papers, to establish under whose authority Gaspard commanded the warship. Gaspard refused, but sent aboard his first lieutenant with a note purported to be from Borgella, signed "Borgellat, general in chief of the south of Hayti". As Borgella had no authority to commission warships, Yeo ordered the first lieutenant to tell Gaspard that his ships must submit to Southampton and be taken to Port Royal, Jamaica, where their ownership could be established by the British naval authorities there. He was given five minutes to consider the proposal.

A British officer accompanied the first lieutenant back to Heureuse Réunion for Gaspard's answer, and was informed within three minutes that Gaspard had no intention of submitting to the British. He was also told that should Yeo be intent on fighting Gaspard's ship, he should indicate it by firing his bow chasers ahead of Heureuse Réunion. Returning to Southampton at 06:30, the British officer relayed the message and the bow chasers were fired, followed a few seconds later by a full broadside from Southampton.

Heureuse Réunion responded to the cannonade in kind. During the engagement, Gaspard repeatedly attempted to board Southampton, where his vastly superior numbers could overwhelm the British. Yeo was aware of his enemy's intentions, and repeatedly manoeuvred out of the way, with the more agile Southampton easily able to remain out of contact with the overloaded Heureuse Réunion. Within half an hour the highly efficient gunners on Southampton had knocked down the mainmast and mizzenmast on Heureuse Réunion, leaving her unable to manoeuvre and vulnerable to repeated pounding at close range. Despite the severe damage the Haitian ship suffered, her crew continued to fire cannon at irregular intervals for 45 minutes, each shot prompting a broadside from Southampton. The two smaller vessels of Gaspard's squadron did not support him, fleeing towards Petit-Goâve to shelter under the batteries there. By 07:45, after over an hour of heavy fire, Yeo hailed Heureuse Réunion to discover whether or not she had surrendered. Somebody aboard replied that they had, although Gaspard had been seriously wounded and was no longer in command, so the identity of the person who gave the surrender is not known.

== Aftermath ==
As Southampton stopped firing, the remaining masts of Heureuse Réunion fell overboard. Casualties on her were immense: of the 600–700 crew, 105 were dead and 120 wounded, the latter including Gaspard, who subsequently died of his injuries. Yeo's loss was one man killed and ten wounded, from a crew of 212. Seeking to rid himself of so many prisoners, Yeo landed most of them on the nearby shore before sailing to Port-au-Prince, where the rest were landed and temporary jury masts were fitted to Heureuse Réunion for her journey to Jamaica. The British retained twenty prisoners for trial at Port Royal. Heureuse Réunion was repaired at Jamaica and subsequently returned to Christophe. Yeo's action in attacking Gaspard and his squadron, although not officially sanctioned by his commanding officer beforehand, was commended.

The Caribbean rose in importance again later in 1812, with the outbreak of the War of 1812 between Britain and the United States. American privateers threatened British trade routes and Royal Navy ships were sent out to intercept them, including Southampton, which was wrecked in the Bahamas during an anti-privateer patrol in November 1812. There were no further significant actions in the region during the Napoleonic Wars, with the presence of Royal Navy patrols deterring any large scale French or American operations in the Caribbean.

== Bibliography ==
- Chandler, David (1999) [1993]. Dictionary of the Napoleonic Wars. Wordsworth Military Library. ISBN 1-84022-203-4.
- Clowes, William Laird (1997) [1900]. The Royal Navy, A History from the Earliest Times to 1900, Volume V. Chatham Publishing. ISBN 1-86176-014-0.
- Gardiner, Robert, ed. (2001) [1998]. The Victory of Seapower. Caxton Editions. ISBN 1-84067-359-1.
- Grocott, Terence (2002) [1997]. Shipwrecks of the Revolutionary & Napoleonic Era. Caxton Editions. ISBN 1-84067-164-5.
- James, William (2002) [1827]. The Naval History of Great Britain, Volume 4, 1805–1807. Conway Maritime Press. ISBN 0-85177-908-5.
- James, William (2002) [1827]. The Naval History of Great Britain, Volume 5, 1808–1811. Conway Maritime Press. ISBN 0-85177-909-3.
- James, William (2002) [1827]. The Naval History of Great Britain, Volume 6, 1811–1827. Conway Maritime Press. ISBN 0-85177-910-7.
- Woodman, Richard (2001). The Sea Warriors. Constable Publishers. ISBN 1-84119-183-3.
