= Republic of Haiti (1820–1849) =

Period of Haitian statehood

Republic of Haiti: République d'Haïti (French); Repiblik Ayiti (Haitian Creole)
- 1820–1849
- Flag Coat of arms

- Maximum extent of the Republic of Haiti from 1822 to 1843
- Capital: Port-au-Prince
- Common languages: French; Spanish; Haitian Creole
- Government: Unitary presidential republic: under an autocratic dictatorship (1820 – December 1843, March 1844–1849)
- President
  - 1820–1843 (first): Jean-Pierre Boyer
  - 1847–1849 (last): Faustin Soulouque
- History
  - Reunification of North and South Haiti: 18 October 1820
  - Haitian occupation of Santo Domingo: 9 February 1822
  - Independence of the Dominican Republic: 27 February 1844
  - Proclamation of President Faustin Soulouque as Emperor Faustin I: 26 August 1849
- Currency: Gourde (HTG)
Preceded by
Republic of Spanish Haiti
Kingdom of Haiti
Republic of Haiti (1806–1820)
Succeeded by
First Dominican Republic
Second Empire of Haiti
- Today part of: Haiti; Dominican Republic

The Republic of Haiti (French: République d'Haïti, Haitian Creole: Repiblik Ayiti, Spanish: República de Haití) from 1820 to 1849 was effectively a continuation of the first Republic of Haiti that had been in control of the south of what is now Haiti since 1806. This period of Haitian history commenced with the fall of the Kingdom of Haiti in the north and the reunification of Haiti in 1820 under Jean-Pierre Boyer. This period also encompassed Haitian occupation of Spanish Santo Domingo from 1822 to 1844, creating a unified political entity governing the entire island of Hispaniola. Although termed a republic, this period was dominated by Boyer's authoritarian rule as president-for-life until 1843. The first Republic of Haiti ended in 1849 when President Faustin Soulouque declared himself emperor, thus beginning the Second Empire of Haiti.

== Background ==
After the assassination of the Emperor Dessalines in 1806, the First Empire of Haiti collapsed and was divided between two former generals of Dessalines.

Initially, Henri Christophe was elected president with limited powers. After Christophe attempted to exert greater power, he ran up against the newly-established Senate under Alexandre Pétion, who defended the capital of Port-au-Prince. Christophe consolidated power in Cap-Haitien, in the north, and established the State of Haiti before declaring himself president-for-life in 1807. In the south, the Senate elected Pétion as President of the first Republic of Haiti. The two Haitis entered a stalemate between the State of Haiti in the north and the Republic of Haiti in the south. In 1811, Christophe declared himself King of Haiti, and the State of Haiti became the Kingdom of Haiti.

Pétion, through control of the Senate, declared himself president-for-life of the Republic of Haiti in 1816. On 29 March 1818, Pétion died and the title of president-for life passed to the commander of his guard, Jean-Pierre Boyer, who gained the support of the Senate. In the northern Kingdom of Haiti, in 1820 Christophe suffered a severe stroke on 15 August, that left him partially paralyzed. Within weeks, dissent was spreading in the Kingdom and Boyer used the opportunity to begin a march north with the Republic of Haiti's army. Abandoned by his guard and expecting the inevitable insurrection, on 7 October 1820 Christophe killed himself by gunshot. Boyer arrived in Cap-Haitien on 20 October 1820, and formally united the two Haitis into the Republic of Haiti without any further hostilities.

== History ==
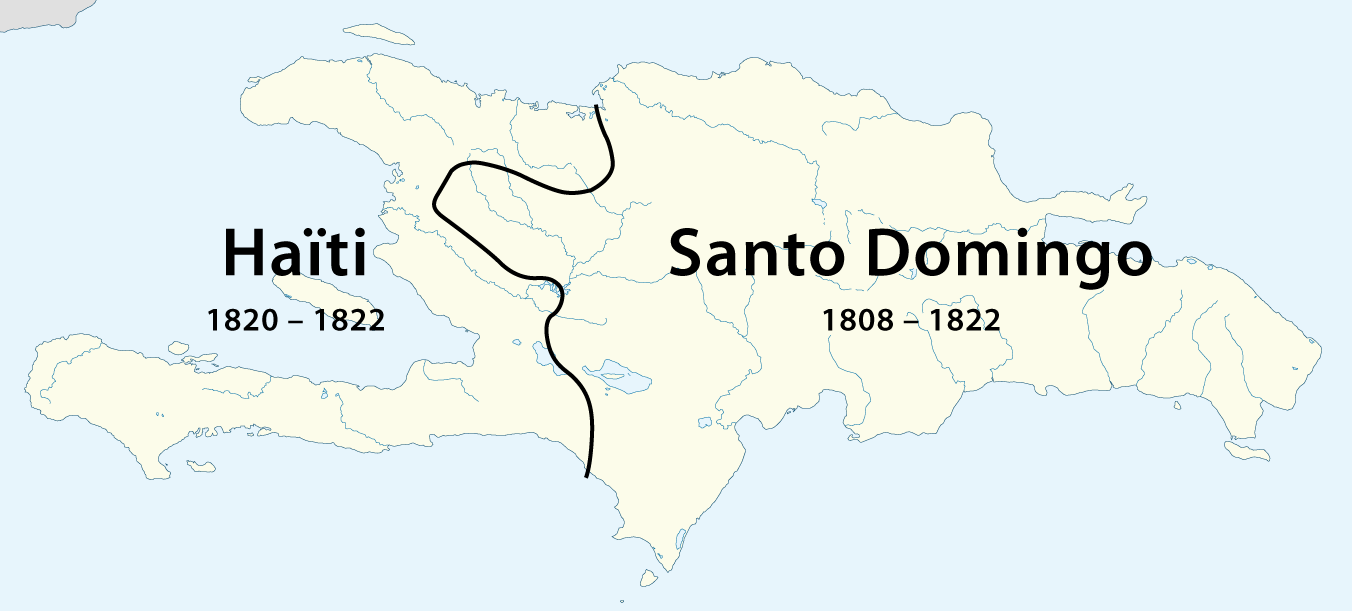
For the first 16 months after the reunification of the Republic of Haiti (South Haiti) with the Kingdom of Haiti (North Haiti), the new Republic controlled only the western portion of Hispaniola. This was also its border after the Dominican War of Independence started in 1844.

=== Unification of Hispaniola ===
In the eastern part of Hispaniola, José Núñez de Cáceres declared the independence of the colony as the Republic of Spanish Haiti on 1 December 1821, and applied for admission to the Republic of Gran Colombia. Nine weeks later, Haitian forces led by Jean-Pierre Boyer entered the newly-declared state and occupied Santo Domingo on 9 February 1822. The military occupation of Santo Domingo would last 22 years, until the fall of Boyer.

=== Rule of Boyer ===
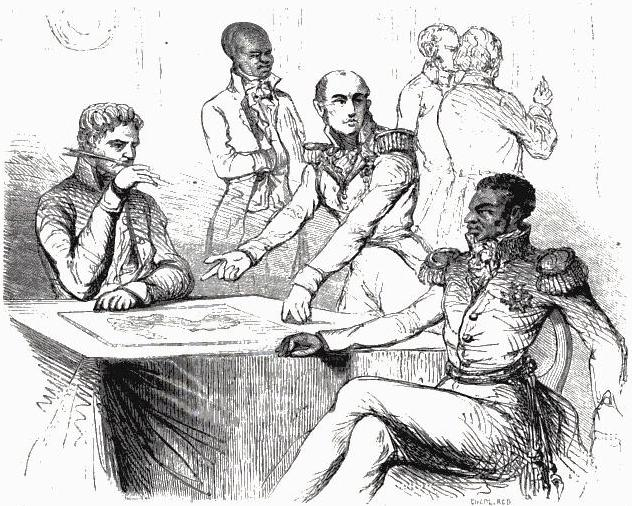
Boyer (right) and Baron Mackau (left) negotiating the Franco-Haitian Treaty of 1825.

After the annexation of Spanish Haiti, Boyer took full powers with the title of "Supreme Chief of the Nation", with the right to choose his successor.

In the two decades that followed the Haitian Revolution and the expulsion of the French colonial government in 1804, Haiti's independence had not been recognized by the world powers. In 1825, King Charles X of France decreed that his nation was to be compensated 150 million gold francs payable in five years in exchange for recognition of Haitian independence. Under threat of invasion, Boyer agreed and by 1826 Haiti was recognized by almost all world powers with the exception of the United States of America (which, influenced by insecure slave-owning white Southerners, wanted nothing to do with revolted slaves). To keep up with the payments to France, Boyer had to implement a special tax and negotiate a loan of 30 million to a French bank with an interest rate of 6%, while asking for a reduction of the debt. Charles X also demanded a 50% reduction in customs (export) duties for products exported to France. The debt was reduced to 60 million payable in thirty years, in February 1838. During Boyer's reign, Haiti's economy shifted from primarily sugarcane to coffee exports.

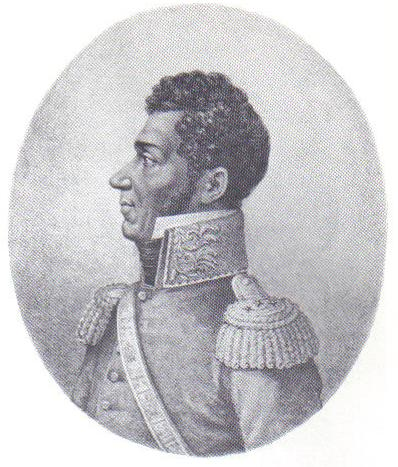
Portrait of Jean-Pierre Boyer.

Boyer and his ministers, Jérôme-Maximilien Borgella and Jonathas Granville, were deeply involved in the mass migration of black Americans to Haiti. Loring D. Dewey of the American Colonization Society (ACS) had been an advocate of former slave migration from the United States to Haiti, as opposed to the more common ACS strategy of repatriating black Americans to Liberia. From September 1824, nearly 6,000 Americans, mainly free blacks, emigrated to Haiti in the space of a year. Due to the island's poverty and the Boyer administration's inability to help support new immigrants in transition, most black Americans returned to the United States after a short period of time.

=== Fall of Boyer ===
Boyer's authoritarian measures eventually lead to a loss of popular support and in 1842 an insurgency arose in Praslin, not far from Les Cayes, headed by General Charles Rivière-Hérard. Boyer attempted to quell the revolt, but with a loss of support and no chance of victory, Boyer abdicated in 1843 and went into exile in Jamaica.

=== Return to Republic ===
Charles Rivière-Hérard would declare himself president-for life but his reign would only last until May 1844. In the month's following Boyer's departure, Santo Domingo took advantage of the chaotic political situation to start a revolution against the Haitian government. Under the leadership of Juan Pablo Duarte, Francisco del Rosario Sánchez, and Matías Ramón Mella, the Dominicans expelled the Haitian forces from Santo Domingo and declared independence on 27 February 1844, this time as the newly-formed Dominican Republic. This would trigger the start of the Dominican War of Independence. During the final five years of the Republic of Haiti, the country would be limited again to the western portion of the island and no longer controlled the eastern side of the island. Following Rivière-Hérard, there would be four more presidents of the Republic of Haiti until Faustin Soulouque was elected president-for-life in 1847.

=== End of the Republic ===
On the 26th of August 1849, Soulouque was proclaimed Emperor of Haiti and the first Republic of Haiti was dissolved. At his coronation ceremony on 18 April 1852, Soulouque become Emperor Faustin I. The Emperor created a new class nobility to surround himself with and began a period of Haitian history known as the Second Haitian Empire.

== See also ==
- History of Haiti
