= Flag of Haiti =

Republic of Haiti
- Bicolour
- Use: State and war flag, state and naval ensign
- Proportion: 3:5
- Adopted: 26 February 1986; 40 years ago
- Design: A horizontal bicolour of blue and red, charged with the coat of arms in a small white box in the center.
- Designed by: Catherine Flon
- Use: Civil flag and ensign
- Proportion: 3:5
- Adopted: 26 February 1986; 40 years ago
- Design: A horizontal bicolour of blue and red.
- Designed by: Catherine Flon

The flag of Haiti (French: drapeau d'Haïti; Haitian Creole: drapo Ayiti) is a bicolour featuring two horizontal bands coloured blue and red, emblazoned by a white rectangular panel bearing the coat of arms of Haiti. The coat of arms depicts a trophy of weapons atop a green hill and a royal palm symbolizing independence. The palm is topped by the Cap of Liberty. The motto L'Union fait la Force ("Unity is strength") appears on a white ribbon below the arrangement.

== Present design ==
=== National flag ===
The present design was first used by the Republic of Haiti under President Alexandre Pétion in 1806. It was most recently readopted on 25 February 2012 under Title I, Chapter I, Article 3 of the current Constitution of Haiti:

L'emblême de la Nation Haïtienne est le Drapeau qui répond à la description suivante:

1. Deux (2) bandes d'étoffe d'égales dimensions: l'une bleue en haut, l'autre rouge en bas, placées horizontalement;
2. Au centre, sur un carré d'étoffe blanche, sont disposées les Armes de la République;
3. Les Armes de la République sont : Le Palmiste surmonté du Bonnet de la Liberté et, ombrageant des ses Palmes, un Trophée d'Armes avec la Légende: L'Union fait la Force.

The English translation adopted by the Embassy of Haiti in Washington, D.C., reads:

The emblem of the Haitian Nation shall be a flag with the following description:

1. Two (2) equal-sized horizontal bands: a blue one on top and a red one underneath;
2. The coat of arms of the Republic shall be placed in the center on a white square;
3. The coat of arms of the Republic are: a Palmette [sic] (Note: palmiste correctly translates to "royal palm", not palmette.) surmounted by the liberty cap, and under the palms a trophy of arms with the legend: In Union there is Strength.

Contrary to the constitutional mandate, the white field is rarely (if ever) rendered as a square. A rectangle with an 11:9 ratio has been adopted by the Haitian Ministry of Information and Coordination since 1987 or earlier.

The flag of Haiti is one of six national flags whose designs incorporate a depiction of the flag itself, the others being the flags of Bolivia, the Dominican Republic, Ecuador, El Salvador, and Venezuela. Notably, Costa Rica has a state flag which is authorized to be used by the government only, which uses the coat of arms of Costa Rica (which includes two ships each flying the flag of Costa Rica). The flag is one of four national flags of UN member states to feature a gun, the others being those of Mozambique, Guatemala, and Bolivia.

=== Civil flag ===
The civil flag and ensign omits the coat of arms.

=== Colours scheme ===
	Blue	Red	White	Yellow	Green
RGB	0/32/159	210/16/52	255/255/255	241/181/23	1/106/22
Hexadecimal	#00209f	#d21034	#ffffff	#f1b517	#016a16
CMYK	100/80/0/38	0/92/75/18	0/0/0/0	0/25/90/5	99/0/79/58

== History ==
The first purely Haitian flag was adopted on 18 May 1803, on the last day of the Congress of Arcahaie, about 80 kilometres (50 mi) north of Port-au-Prince. Haitian lore holds that the newly appointed revolutionary leader Jean-Jacques Dessalines created the flag by taking a French tricolor and ripping out the white center, which he discarded. He then asked Catherine Flon, his god-daughter, to sew the remaining bands together. The white pale removed due to its association with the White Europeans, the blue was taken to represent the Black Africans and the red to represent the mulattos. The story is widely known in Haiti: the anniversary of the date is celebrated as the Flag and Universities Day and images of Catherine Flon have appeared on Haitian currency and stamps.

Following his proclamation as Emperor Jacques I, Dessalines promulgated a new constitution on 20 May 1805. In it, the colors of the flag were altered to black and red. This flag being subsequently adopted by Henri Christophe, the republicans under Alexandre Pétion returned to the colors blue and red, subsequently turning them horizontal and adding the newly adopted Haitian coat of arms.

During the period of the Haitian Empire of Faustin I, his coat of arms was used on the flag and for official functions, but it was subsequently abandoned upon his removal from office.

Until 1937, the flag of Liechtenstein was also plain horizontal blue and red. The match was first noted at the 1936 Summer Olympics, and so Liechtenstein altered its flag by adding a golden crown to the canton and Haiti altered its flag by adding the coat of arms, which was created in 1808.

Between 1964 and 1986, the family dictatorships of François "Papa Doc" and Jean-Claude "Baby Doc" Duvalier returned to Dessalines' black and red design. They included the national coat of arms, but altered the flags in its trophy to black as well.

Flag used for the whole island under the Marquis de Caradeu (with supposed powers from the French Assembly), commander of the National Guard of Port-au-Prince

Flag from 1803 to 1804

Flag of the Empire of Haiti (1804–1806)

Flag of the State of Haiti (1806–1811)

Flag of the Kingdom of Haiti (1811–1820)

Flag of the Republic of Haiti (1806–1820) and Republic of Haiti (1820–1849)

Flag of the Empire of Haiti (1849–1859)

Flag from 1859 to 1964, used by the Republic of Haiti (1859–1957)

Flag from 1964 to 1986, used by Duvalier family

Flag of Haiti (since 1986)

Civil flag of Haiti (since 1986)

== See also ==
- Haitian Flag Day
- Duvalier family
- List of Haitian flags
- Coat of arms of Haiti
- Flag of France
- Flag of Liechtenstein
