= Haitian gourde =

Currency

gourde haïtienne (French); goud ayisyen (Haitian Creole)
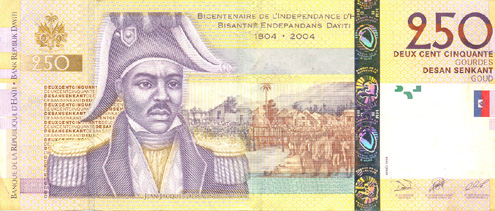
- 250 gourde banknote exhibiting Jean-Jacques Dessalines

ISO 4217
- Code: HTG (numeric: 332)
- Subunit: 0.01

Units of account
- Symbol: G
- Superunit
- 5: Dollar ($)
- Subunit
- 5/100: Penny (p)
- 1/100: Centime (c)

Denominations
- Banknotes
- Freq. used: G 10, G 25, G 50, G 100, G 250, G 500
- Rarely used: G 1, G 2, G 5, G 20, G 1,000
- Coins: 5c, 10c, 20c, 50c, G 1, G 5

Demographics
- User(s): Haiti

Issuance
- Central bank: Banque de la République d'Haïti
- Website: www.brh.ht

Valuation
- Inflation: 27.8%
- Source: , 2025
- Value: $1 = G130.85

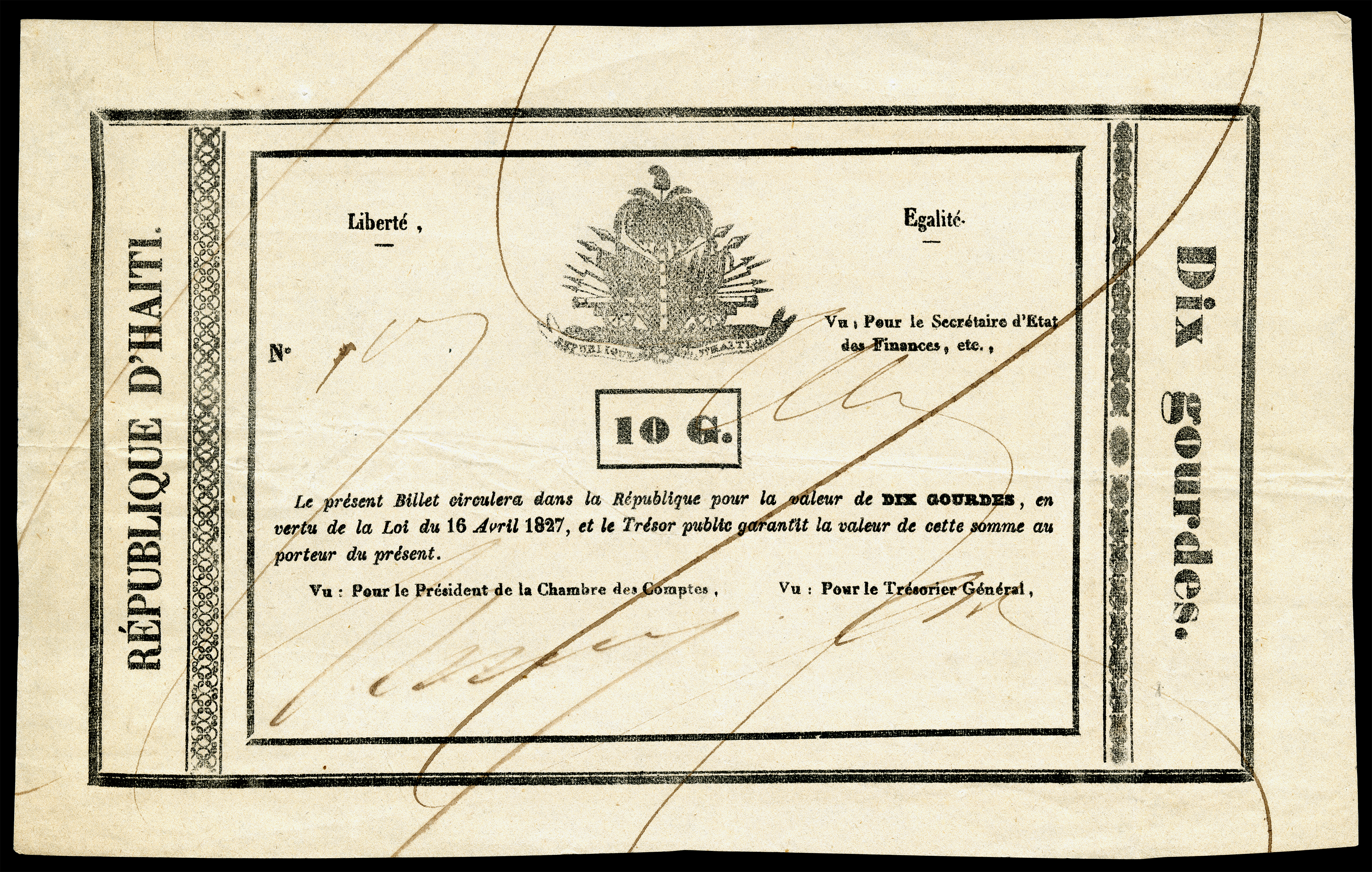
Republique d'Haïti (1820-1849), 10 gourdes

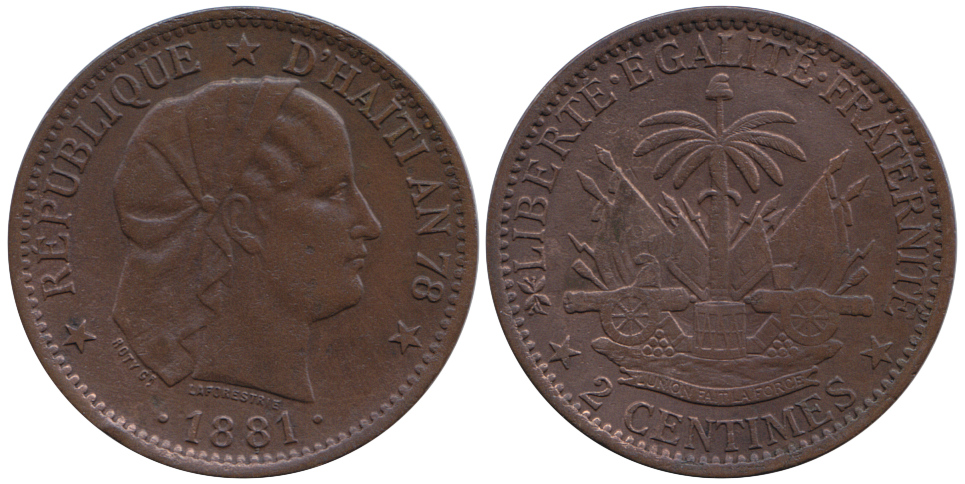
2 centime coin, "Haitian woman profile" type, bronze (1881).

The gourde (French: [ɡuʁd]) or goud (Haitian Creole: [ɡud]) is the currency of Haiti. Its ISO 4217 code is HTG and it is divided into 100 centimes (French) or santim (Creole).

The word "gourde" is a French cognate for the Spanish term "gordo", from the "pesos gordos" (also known in English as "hard" pieces of eight, and in French as "piastres fortes espagnoles") in which colonial-era contracts within the Spanish sphere of influence were often denominated.

== First gourde, 1813–1870 ==
The first gourde was introduced in 1813 and replaced the livre at a rate of G 1 = 8 livres and 5 sous.

=== Coins ===
The first issues of coins were silver pieces of 6, 12, and 25 centimes. The Haitian government attempted to make money by declaring a much higher value to their coins than the intrinsic value of the metal. In 1827, 50c and 100c coins were introduced, followed by 1c and 2c in 1828. In 1846 and 1850, 6 1/4c coins were issued as well as 6c coins. In 1863, bronze coins, produced by the Heaton mint of Birmingham, were issued. These were in denominations of 5c, 10c and 20c and were the last coins of the first gourde.

=== Banknotes ===
The governments of Haiti issued paper money in denominations of G 1, G 2, G 5, G 10, G 20, G 25, G 50, G 100, G 500, and G 1,000.

== Second gourde, 1870–1872 ==
In 1870 the gourde was revalued at a rate of ten to one. Only banknotes were issued for this second gourde, with the government issuing notes of G 10 and G 25.

== Third gourde, 1872–present ==
In 1872, the gourde was again revalued, this time at a rate of three hundred to one. In the early years of this third gourde, only banknotes were being issued and the name piastre was sometimes used instead of gourde, especially on a banknote issue dated 1875. In 1881, the gourde was linked to the French franc at F 5 = G 1 and coin production recommenced.

The peg to the franc did not last, however. In 1912, the gourde was pegged to the US dollar at a value of G 5 to US$1. However this peg was also abandoned in 1989, and the currency now floats. Due to the old link, G 5 is often referred to as a "Haitian dollar" and 5c is called a "Haitian penny". Indeed, in many places, prices are given not in gourdes, but rather in "Haitian dollars", which must be multiplied by five to convert to gourdes.

=== Coins ===
10 centimes 1949
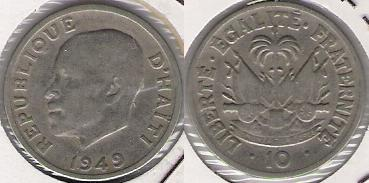
First side of the image: Dumarsais Estimé
Second side of the image: Coat of arms

The 1881 issue of coins consisted of denominations of 1c, 2c, 10c, 20c, and 50c and G 1. 5c coins were added in 1889. Production of the 1c and 2c and G 1 pieces ceased in the mid-1890s, whilst coin production ceased entirely from 1908 until 1949, when 5c and 10c coins were again minted. These were followed by 20c pieces in 1956, 50c in 1972 and G 1 and G 5 in 1995.

Coins currently in circulation are:

- 50c
- G 1
- G 5

=== Banknotes ===
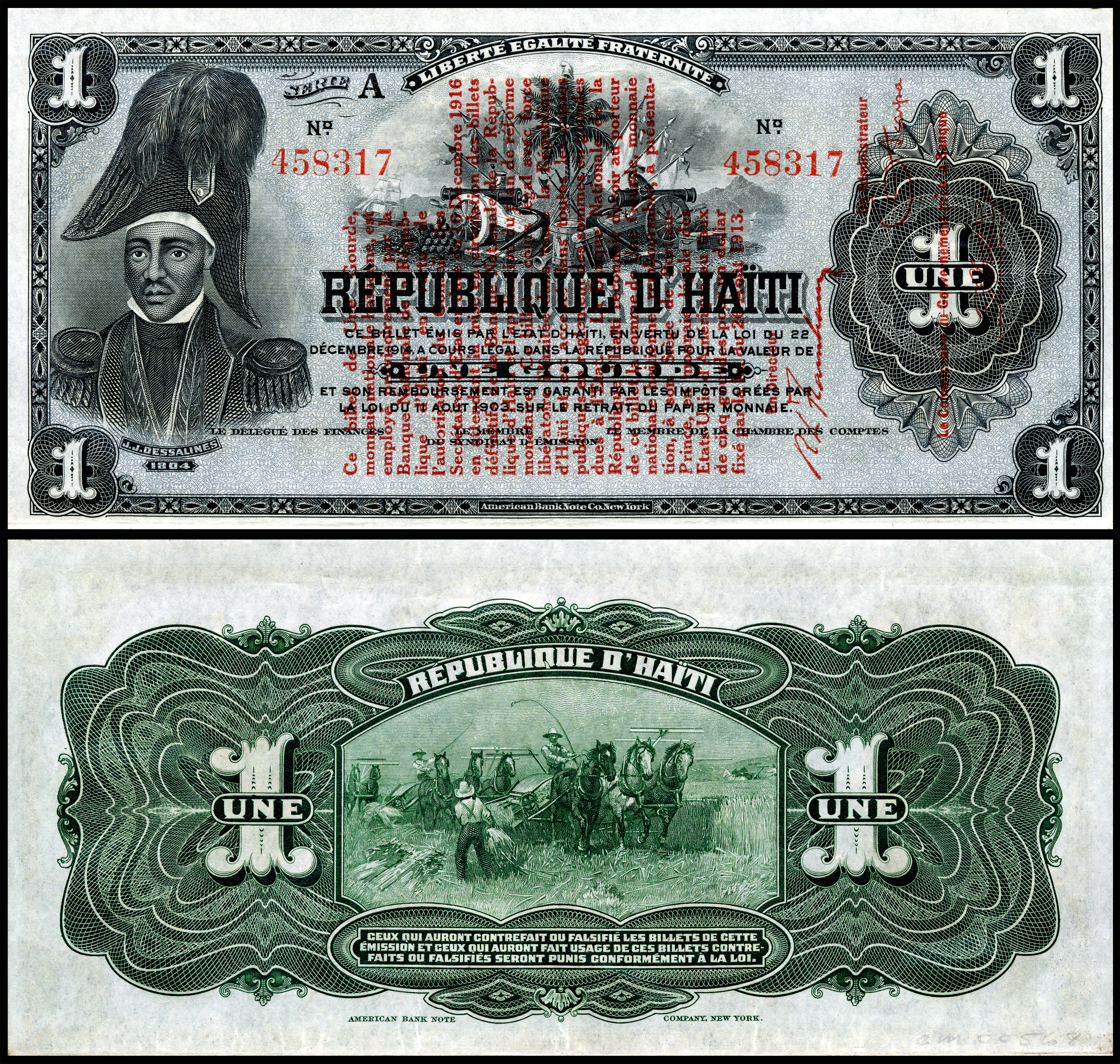
Banque nationale de la République d'Haïti, 1 gourde (1916).

In 1875, banknotes were issued by the National Bank of Haiti in denominations of 25c, 1 and 5 piastres (equal to the gourde). Following this, banknotes were issued in denominations ranging from 10c to G 5 by the various Haitian governments until 1916, when the National Bank of the Republic of Haiti (BNRH) began issuing notes. In 1920, G 1, G 2, G 5, G 10 and G 20 notes were issued, with G 50 and G 100 added in 1925. In the 1970s, G 25, G 250, and G 500 notes were introduced. In 1979, the Bank of the Republic of Haiti replaced the BNRH as the paper money issuing body. A 1,000 gourde note was introduced in 1999, to commemorate the 250th anniversary of the founding of Port-au-Prince. A G 20 note was released into circulation in 2001, both as a commemorative (to celebrate the bicentennial of the Constitution of Toussaint L'Ouverture) and as a regular issue. In 2004, the Bank of the Republic of Haiti issued a series of notes to commemorate the bicentennial of Haiti.

Banknotes currently in circulation are:

- G 10
- G 25
- G 50
- G 100
- G 250
- G 500
- G 1,000

Older series
Image	Value	Obverse	Reverse	Year
	G 10	Catherine Flon Arcahaie sewing the first flag of Haiti (1803)	Coat of arms of Haiti	2000
	G 20	François-Dominique Toussaint l'Ouverture	Constitution of Haiti	2001
	G 25	The Palace of Justice in Port-au-Prince	Coat of arms of Haiti	2000
	G 50	Lysius Félicité Salomon Jeune	Coat of arms of Haiti	2000
	G 100	Henri Christophe (President of Northern Haiti, later King Henri I of Haiti)	Coat of arms of Haiti	2000
	G 250	Jean-Jacques Dessalines (Emperor Jacques I of Haiti)	Coat of arms of Haiti	2000
	G 500	Alexandre Sabès Pétion (President of Southern Haiti)	Coat of arms of Haiti	2000
	G 1,000	President Florvil Hyppolite	Marché Vallière	1999

Commemorative banknotes of the Haitian gourde
Image	Value	Obverse	Reverse	Anotations	Year
	G 20	François-Dominique Toussaint Louverture	Constitution of Haiti of 1801	Commemorative text on the watermark area of the note; gold foil strip on the right edge of the note; slightly curved serial numbers on either side of the front of the note	2001

=== Bicentennial of Independence (1804–2004) series ===
Bicentennial of Independence (1804–2004) currently in circulation
Image	Value	Obverse	Reverse	Year
	G 10 (Dix Gourdes; Dis Goud)	Sanité Belair (Attack and take of the Crête-à-Pierrot)	Fort Cap Rouge (Jacmel)	2004
	G 25 (Vingt-Cinq Gourdes; Vennsenk Goud)	General Nicolas Geffrard (Governor of Southern Haiti)	Des Platons fortress (Dussis)	2004
	G 50 (Cinquante Gourdes; Senkant Goud)	François Cappoix	Fort Jalousière (Marmelade)	2004
	G 100 (Cent Gourdes; San Goud)	Henri Christophe (President of Northern Haiti, later King Henri I of Haiti) (Invasion of Cape Haitian by the French army)	Henry Citadel (Milot)	2004
	G 250 (Deux Cent Cinquante gourdes; Desan Senkant Goud)	Jean-Jacques Dessalines (Emperor Jacques I of Haiti)	Fort Décidé (Marchand)	2004
	G 500 (Cinq Cent Gourdes; Senksan Goud)	Alexandre Sabès Pétion (President of Southern Haiti)	Fort Jacques (Fermathe)	2004
	G 1,000	President Florvil Hyppolite	Marché Vallière	1999

Note: The G 1, G 2, G 5, G 20 notes are no longer produced and are no longer in circulation.

Current HTG exchange rates
From Google Finance:	AUD CAD CHF CNY EUR GBP HKD JPY USD EUR JPY USD
From Yahoo! Finance:	AUD CAD CHF CNY EUR GBP HKD JPY USD EUR JPY USD
From XE.com:	AUD CAD CHF CNY EUR GBP HKD JPY USD EUR JPY USD
From OANDA:	AUD CAD CHF CNY EUR GBP HKD JPY USD EUR JPY USD

== See also ==
- Central banks and currencies of the Caribbean
- Economy of Haiti
