= Trophy of arms =

Display of weaponry and other militaria

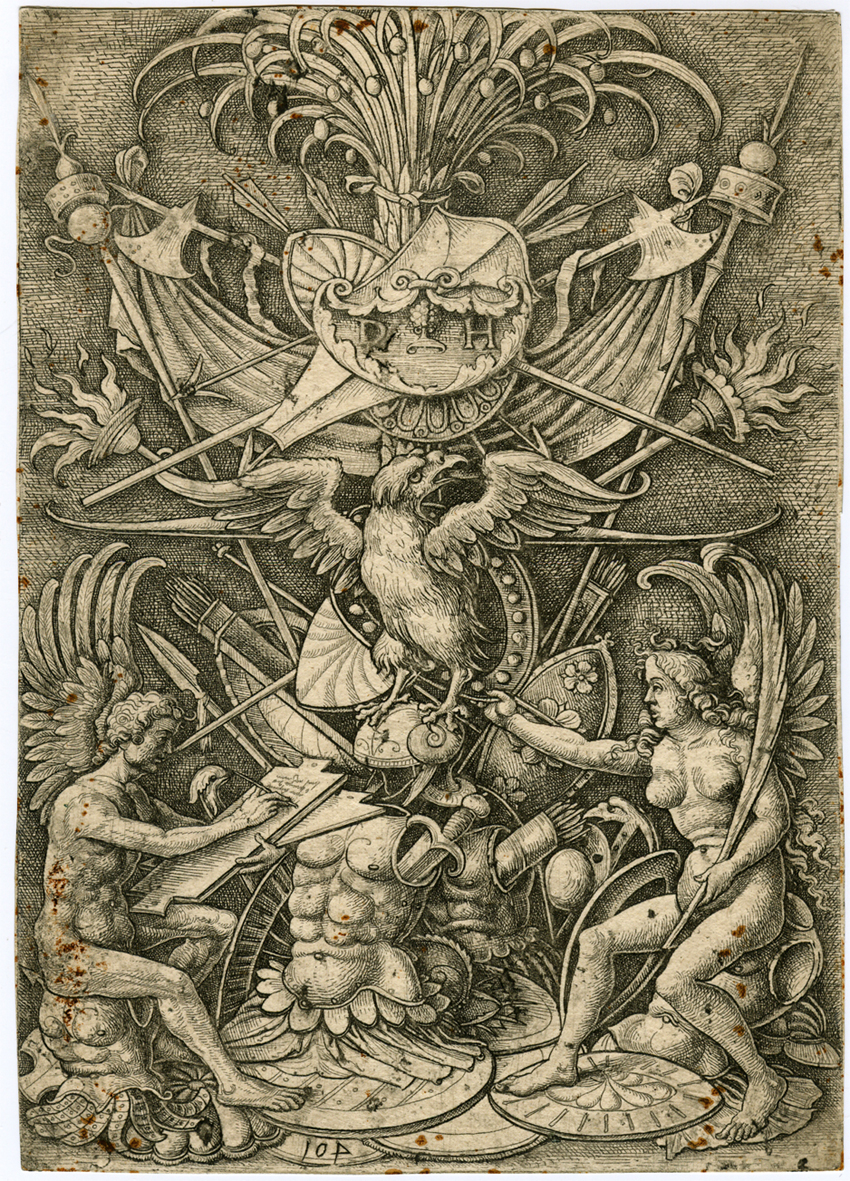
Engraving of "A Trophy of Arms with History and Victory seated at lower left and right", by Daniel Hopfer (c.1470-1536). Victory extends her hand toward the god Jupiter in form of an eagle

A trophy or trophy of arms in art and architecture is a real or depicted artistically assembled display of weaponry and other militaria, often captured from a defeated enemy, as an ornament designed for the purpose of triumphalist display by a victor or as a show of military prowess by a monarch. Similar decorative vertical arrangements of hunting accessories, musical instruments or other objects are also commonly referred to as trophies.

The term comes from the ancient Greek tropaion and Roman equivalent tropaeum, military victories which were commemorated with a display of actual captured arms, armour and standards. The use of trophies as an ornament in decoration became popular in the Italian Renaissance, and as an architectural element in relief or free-standing sculpture during the Baroque era, where they are often used as a kind of finial to decorate rooflines, gate columns and other elements of buildings with military associations, which included most royal palaces.

The Triumphs of Caesar by Andrea Mantegna (1482–94, now Royal Collection) are a series of paintings of the Roman triumph of Julius Caesar that soon became enormously influential in print form. They showed trophies carried on carts and on poles, and probably gave a big impetus to the trend for ornament prints of trophies, which were then copied into a range of media.

== Origins ==
The practice was used in the classical age by the Greeks and Romans. Homer's Iliad relates the practice of warriors in the Trojan War removing the armour and weapons of a killed opponent in order to make an offering to the gods. This was contrasted to mere booty. Trophies of arms were commonly depicted on Greek and Roman coins.

In England a tradition of making trophies of arms and armour, designed to display British military prowess, was established in the armoury of the Tower of London from the late 17th century. In about 1700, John Harris created an impressive display in the Grand Storehouse which included a serpent and a seven-headed Hydra, together with a variety of weapons including muskets, pistols and swords. The antiquarian William Maitland described it as a sight "no one ever beheld without astonishment...not to be matched perhaps in the world".

== Constituent elements ==
Elements commonly depicted within antique trophies of arms include:

- breastplates
- spears
- halberds
- bows
- arrows
- quivers
- lit torches
- swords
- cannon and balls
- captured military standards
- clubs
- heraldry and coats of arms

== Gallery ==
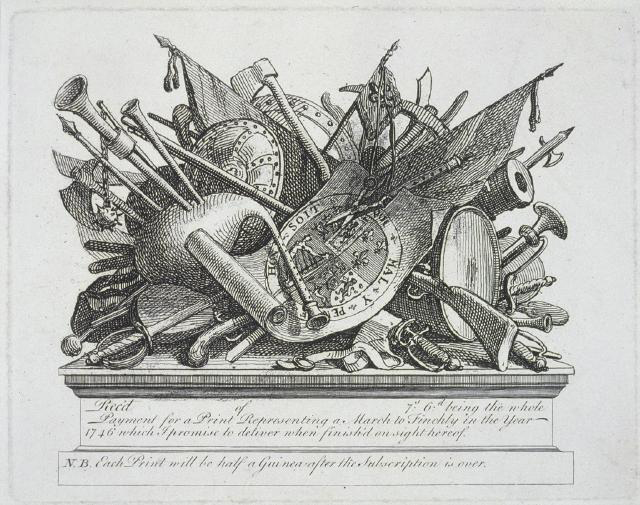
Antique trophy of arms, with Scottish bagpipes, engraving circa 1750 by William Hogarth (1697–1764)

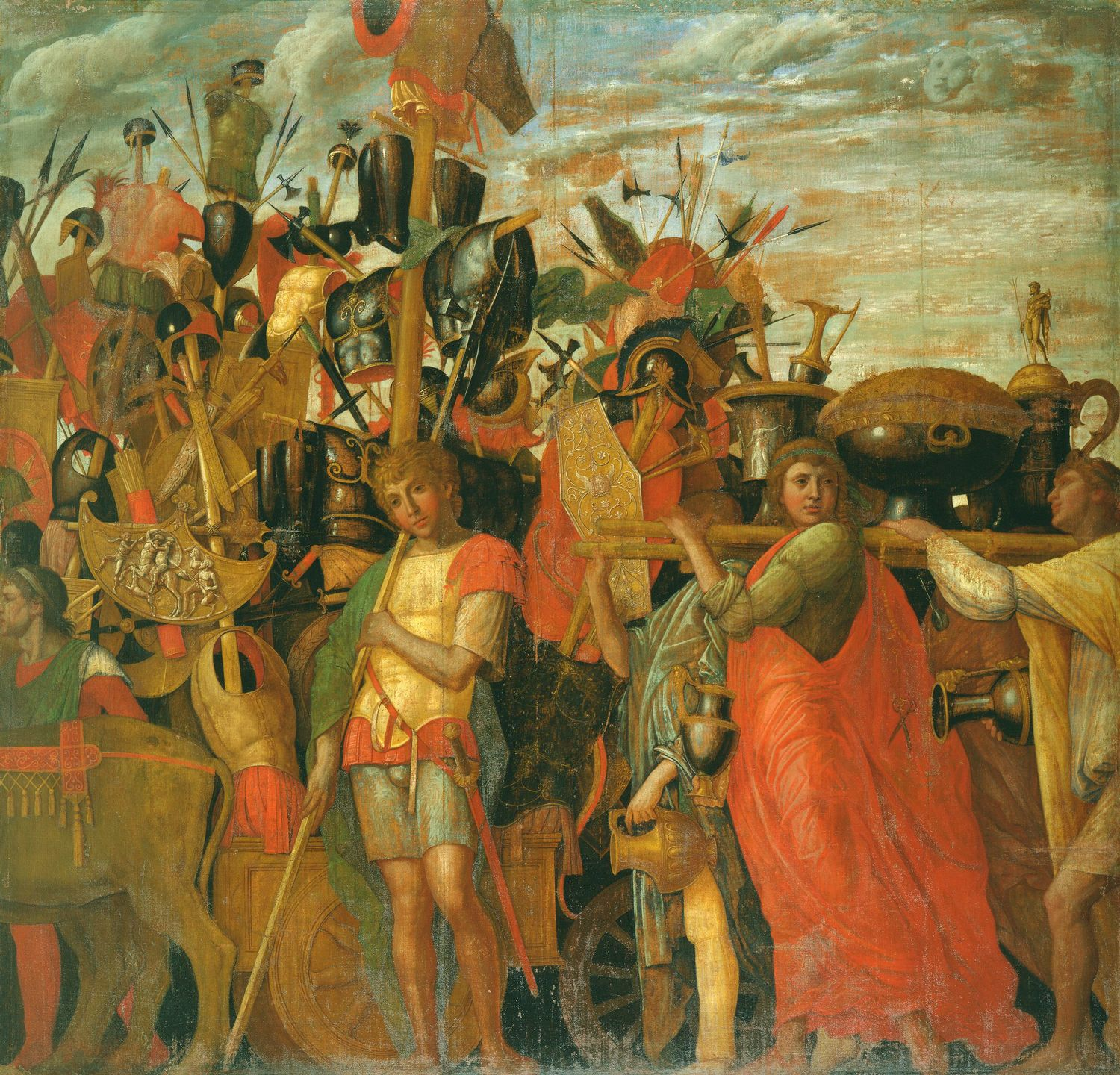
Scene from the Triumphs of Caesar by Andrea Mantegna

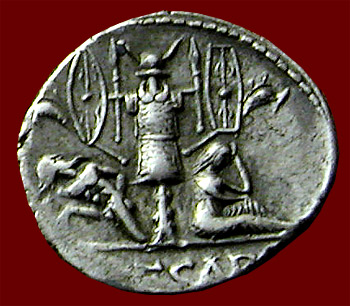
Roman Denarius circa 46-45 BC, depicting a trophy of arms tropaion from the Gallic Wars of Julius Caesar showing a captured Gaul on one side and a mourning female symbolizing Gallia, defeated, on the other

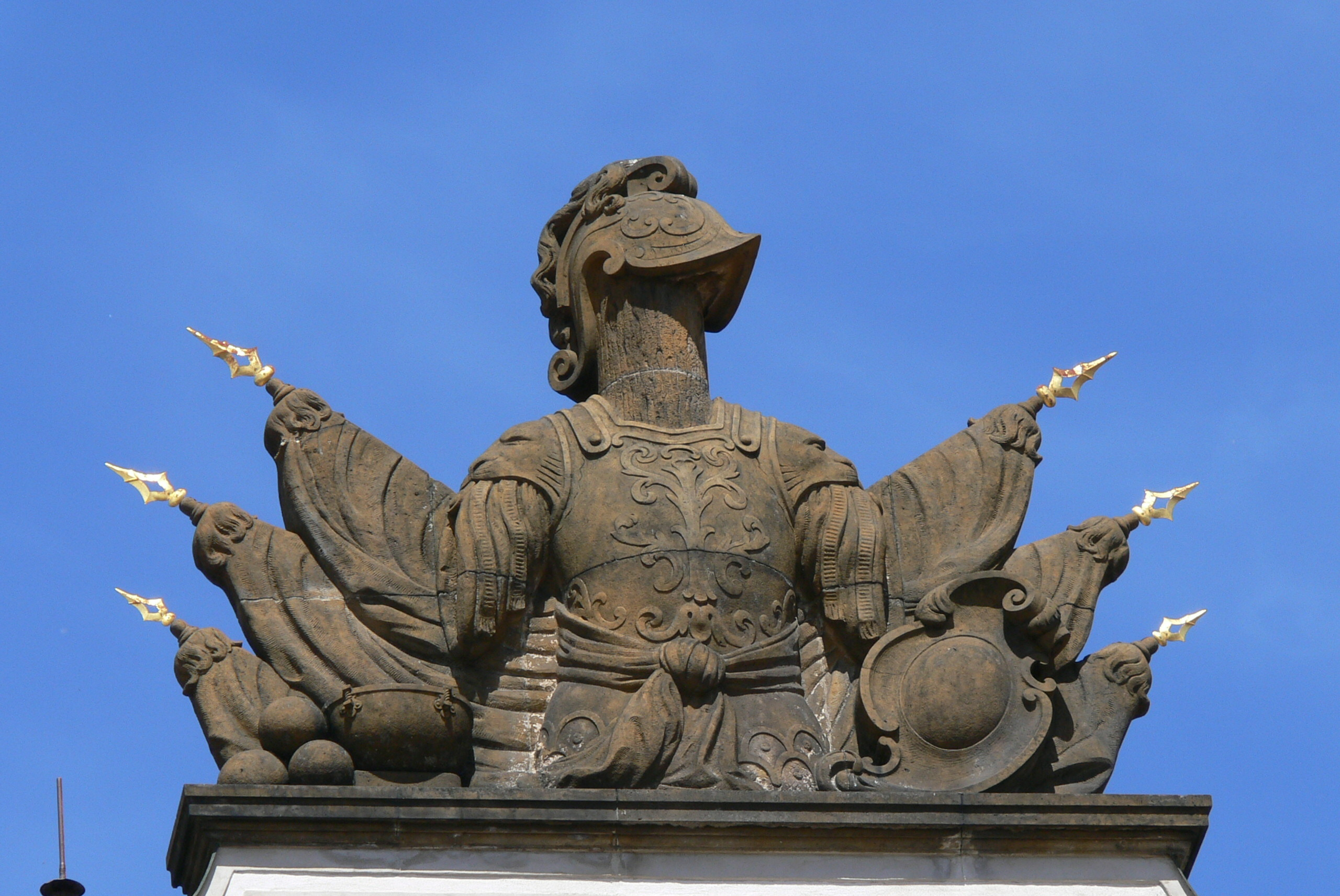
Trophy in the 1st courtyard of Prague Castle

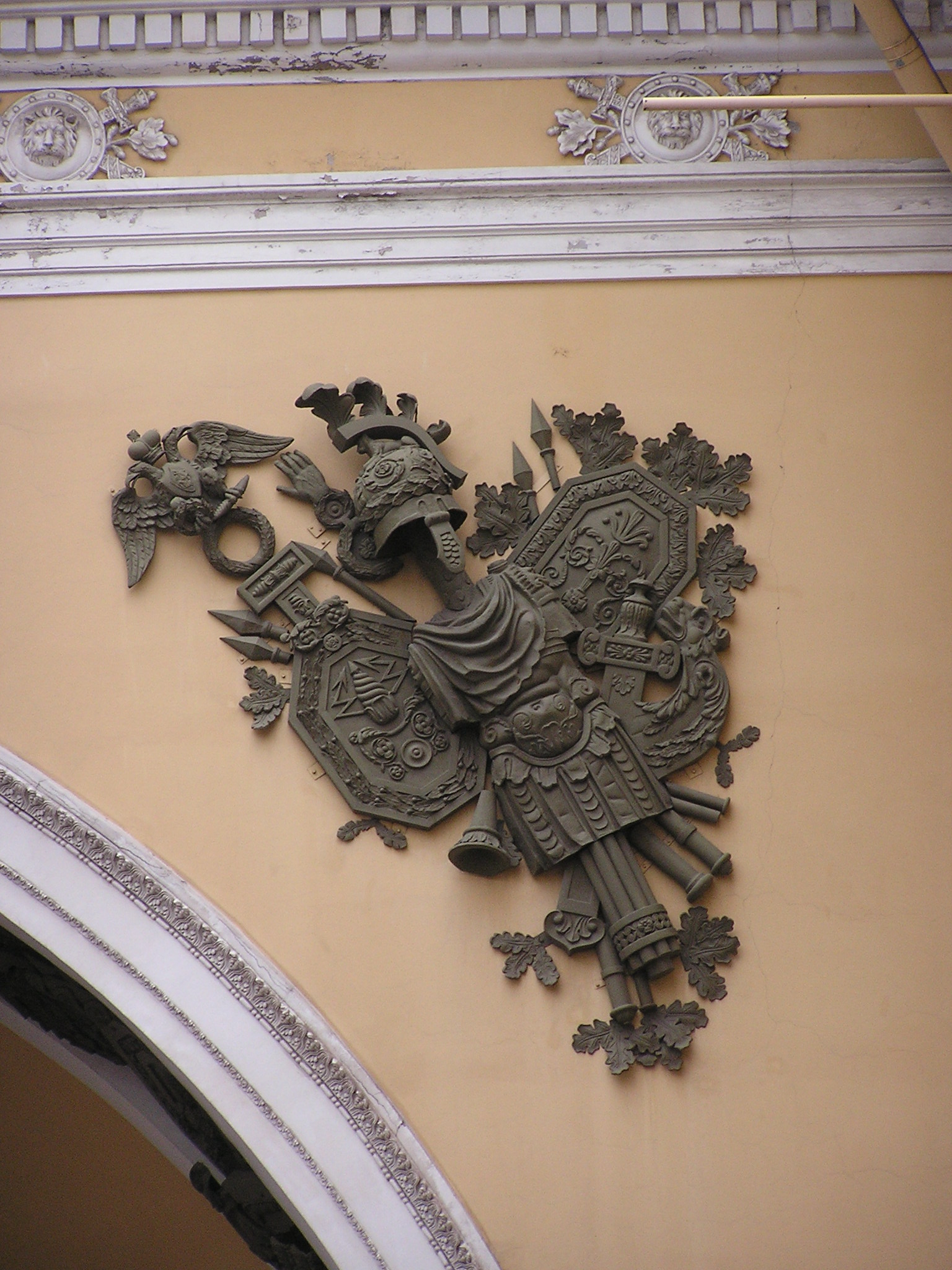
Trophy at the gate of the General Staff Building (Saint Petersburg)

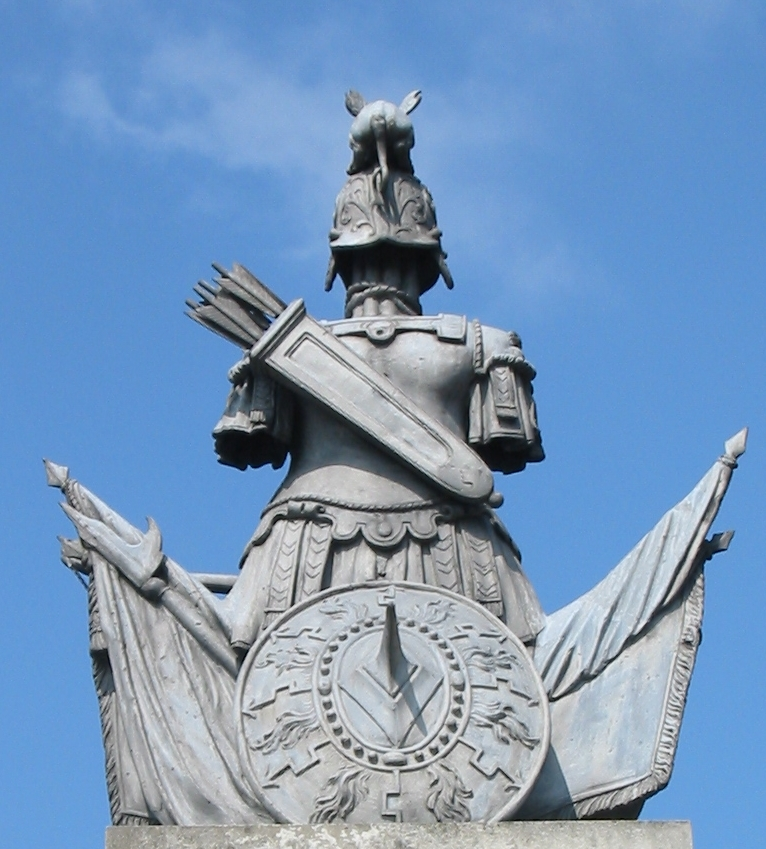
Trophy at the main gate of Hampton Court Palace

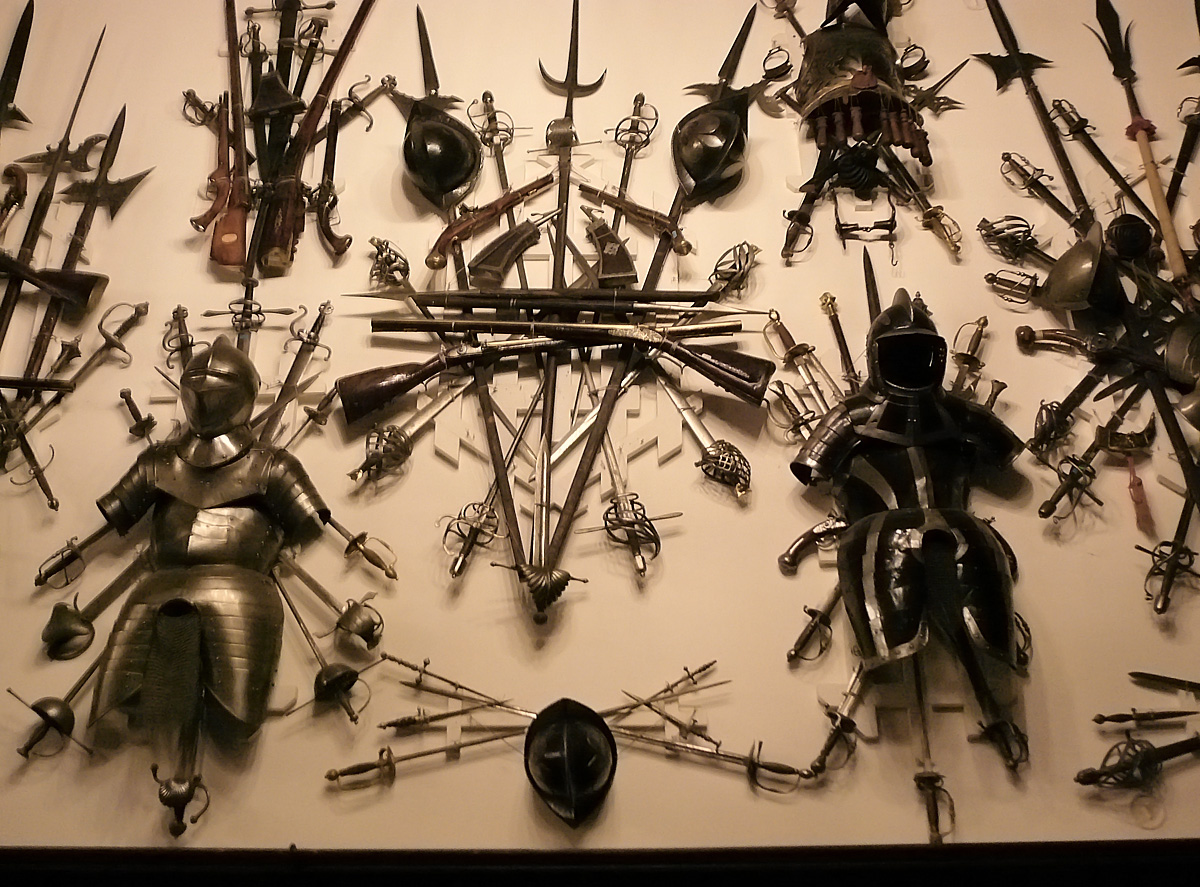
Trophies of arms with real weapons and armour at Peleş Castle, Romania

The Coat of arms of Copenhagen doubles as a trophy of arms

The Coat of arms of Haiti

== See also ==
- War trophy
