= Republic of Haiti (1806–1820) =

State in southwestern Hispaniola from 1806 to 1820

Republic of Haiti: République d'Haïti (French); Repiblik Ayiti (Haitian Creole)
- 1806–1820
- Flag Coat of arms

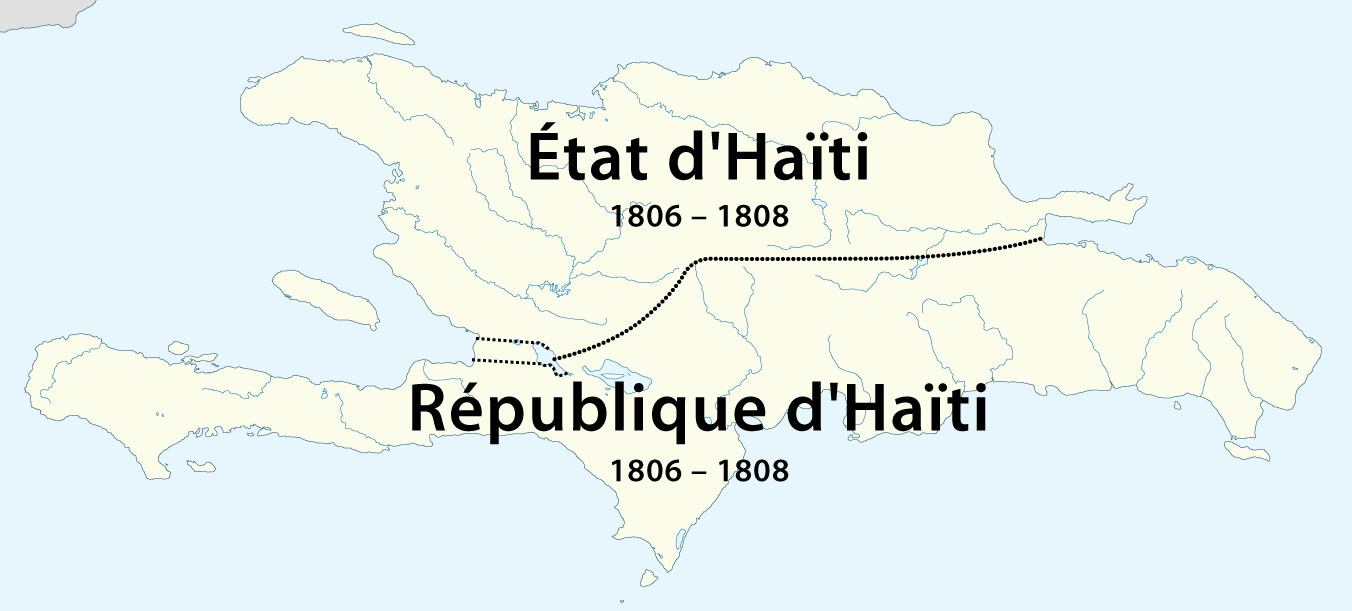
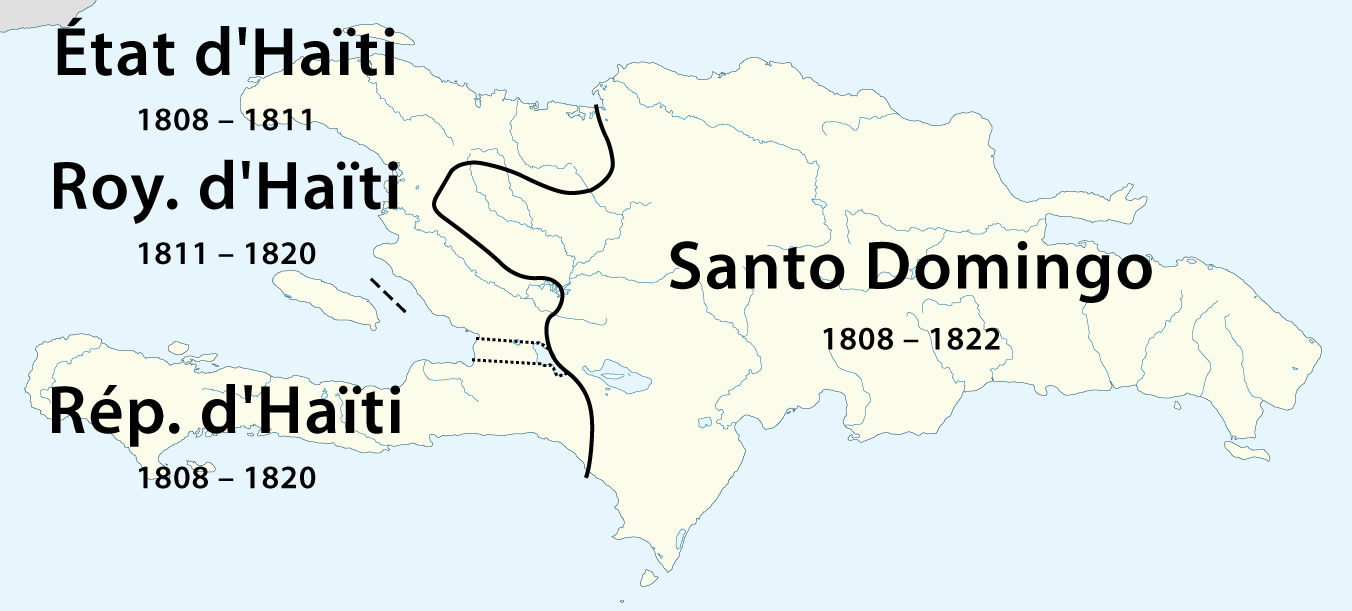
- Republic of Haiti from 1806–1808 The Republic of Haiti in the southwest of Hispaniola from 1808–1820
- Capital: Port-au-Prince
- Common languages: French language, Haitian Creole
- Religion: Roman Catholicism
- Demonym: Haitian
- Government: Unitary presidential republic: under an autocratic dictatorship (1816–1820)
- President
  - 1807–1818: Alexandre Pétion
  - 1818–1820: Jean-Pierre Boyer
- Legislature: Parliament
  - Upper Chamber: Senate
  - Lower Chamber: Chamber of Deputies
- History
  - Assassination of Emperor Jacques I: 17 October 1806
  - Reunification of North and South Haiti: 18 October 1820
- Currency: Haitian gourde
Preceded by	Succeeded by
First Empire of Haiti	Republic of Haiti (1820–1849)
- Today part of: Haiti

The first Republic of Haiti (French: République d'Haïti; Haitian Creole: Repiblik Ayiti) controlled the southern portions of Haiti from 1806 until 1820. The republic, commonly referred to as South Haiti during its existence, was created on 17 October 1806, following the assassination of Emperor Jacques I and the overthrow of the First Empire of Haiti. The southern Republic of Haiti was ruled by General Alexandre Pétion, a free person of color, as President from 9 March 1807 until his death on 29 March 1818. He was succeeded by Jean-Pierre Boyer. This death allowed for Haiti to be reunited under one flag and country. Prior to this the country was in a civil war as they fought to complete the reunification of the country.

While the Republic of Haiti had control in the south, Henri Christophe ruled over the north of the country as President of the State of Haiti until 1811 when he proclaimed the Kingdom of Haiti with himself as King Henri I. Following King Henri's death in 1820, Haiti was unified as a single republican state under Boyer.

== Domestic policies ==
Initially a supporter of democracy, Pétion modified the terms of the presidency in the Revision of the Haitian Constitution of 1806 on 2 June 1816, making the post of president a position for life, with the president having the power to appoint his successor. Furthermore, he found the constraints imposed on him by the Senate onerous and suspended the legislature in 1818.

Pétion named General Jean-Pierre Boyer as his successor; the Senate approved his choice. Boyer took control in 1818 following the death of Pétion from yellow fever. After Henri I and his son died in 1820, Boyer reunited the two parts of the country in 1820; he went on to unify the entire island of Hispaniola under his rule in 1822, and presided over the unified Republic of Haiti until his overthrow in 1843.

=== Economic policies ===
Pétion seized commercial plantations from the rich gentry. He had the land redistributed to his supporters and the peasantry, earning him the nickname Papa Bon-Cœur ("good-hearted father"). The land seizures and changes in agriculture reduced the production of commodities for the export economy. Most of the population became full subsistence farmers, and exports and state revenue declined sharply, making survival difficult for the new state.

== Foreign relations ==
Pétion gave sanctuary to the independence leader Simón Bolívar in 1815 and provided him with material and infantry support. This vital aid played a defining role in Bolivar's military career, and ensured his success in the campaign to liberate the countries of what would make up Gran Colombia.

== Gallery ==
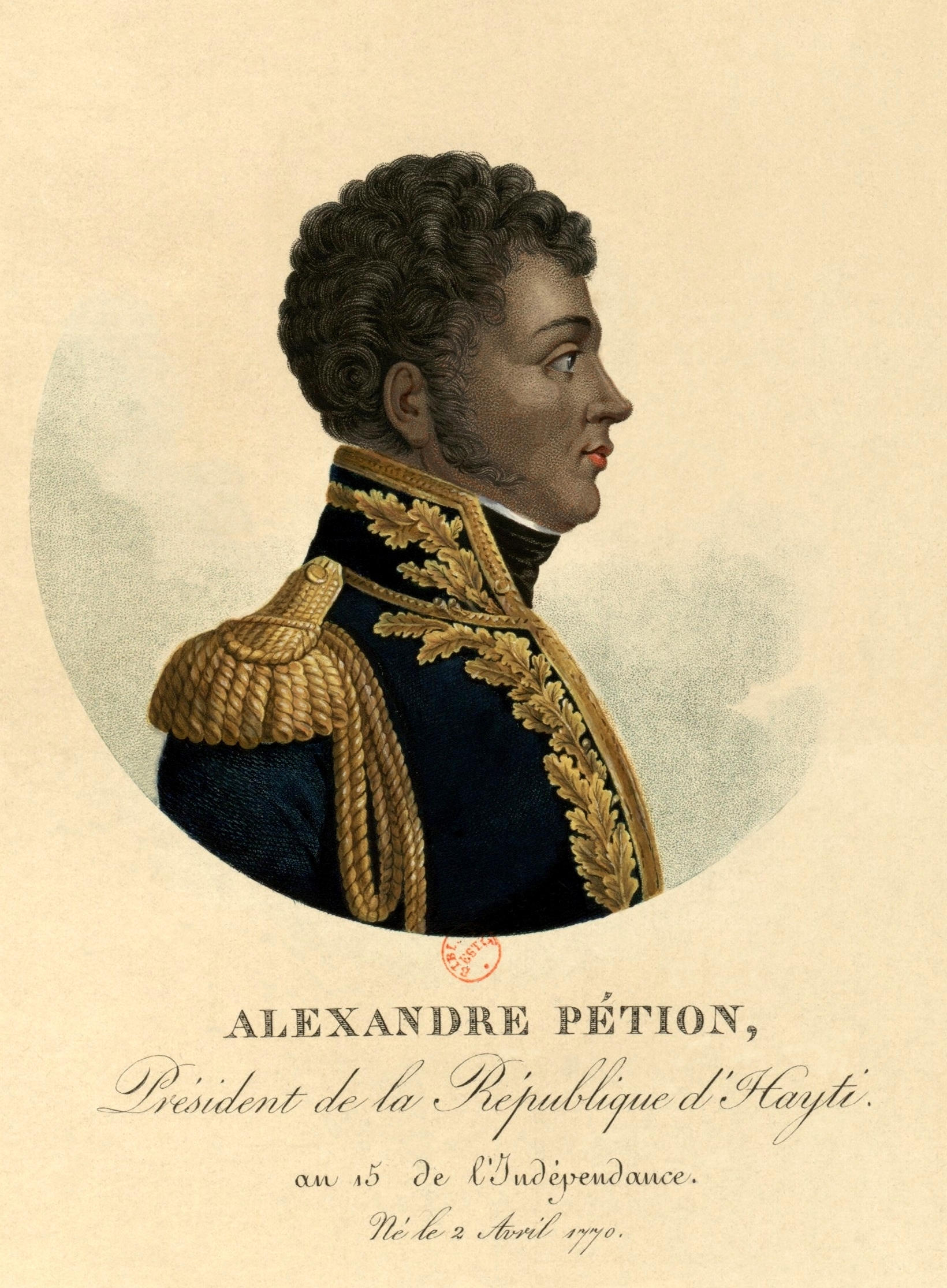
1st President Alexandre Pétion

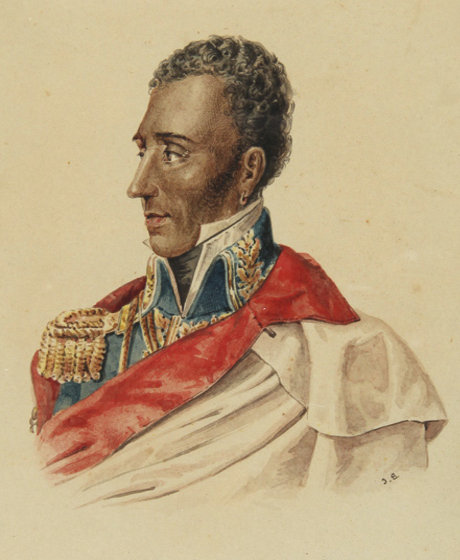
2nd President Jean-Pierre Boyer

== See also ==
- History of Haiti
