= Catherine Flon =

Haitian seamstress, patriot, and national heroine (1772-1831)

- Born: December 2, 1772; Arcahaie, Saint-Domingue (now Haiti)
- Died: 1831 (aged 58–59)
- Occupations: Seamstress, patriot
- Family: Jean-Jacques Dessalines (godfather)

Catherine Flon (1772-1831) was a Haitian seamstress, patriot and national heroine. She is regarded as one of the symbols of the Haitian Revolution and independence. She is celebrated for sewing the first Haitian flag on May 18, 1803, and maintains an important place in Haitian memory of the Revolution to this day.

== Life ==
Catherine Flon was born on December 2, 1772, in Arcahaie in Saint-Domingue. Her parents traded in textiles from France. She became a seamstress with her own workshop, and had several apprentices. She was the god daughter of Jean-Jacques Dessalines.

=== Creation of the flag ===
According to Haitian revolutionary tradition, Flon created the country's first flag on May 18, 1803, the last day of the Congress of Arcahaie. There, the leader of the Revolution, Jean-Jacques Dessalines, Flon's godfather, cut apart a French tricolor with his sabre, demonstrating his desire to break away from France. He gave the pieces to Flon, who stitched them back together, while leaving out the central white strip. In Haitian lore, the colors of the new flag took on a racialized meaning: the blue and red stripes represented a union between the black and mulatto citizens of Haiti.

Historians have noted some limitations within this legendary history of the flag's creation. For instance, primary sources from the Revolution reveal that rebels had used blue-and-red flags before the Arcahaie conference. Also, the first Haitians to use the bicolor flag had meant it to represent an extension of French Revolutionary values, rather than a rejection of them; early revolutionaries had fought to preserve the 1794 law of emancipation rather than to gain independence.

== In Haitian culture and memory ==
Catherine Flon is regarded as one of the three most symbolic heroines of the Haitian independence, alongside Cécile Fatiman and Dédée Bazile. Her birthplace of Arcahaie is today referred to as "flag town" and the date on which she is said to have made the first flag, May 18, has become a national holiday. Besides serving as a symbol of the Revolution, Flon has also become a figure of admiration among Haitian women. Social events and woman-led activist movements are named after the revolutionary hero. On festivals and national holidays, young women dress as Flon and other female revolutionaries, calling attention to the role of women in the Revolution and in Haitian history as a whole.

Her picture was featured on a 10-Gourdes Haitian banknote issued in 2000.
