= Marché en Fer =

Iron Market
- French: Marché en fer Haitian Creole: Mache an fè
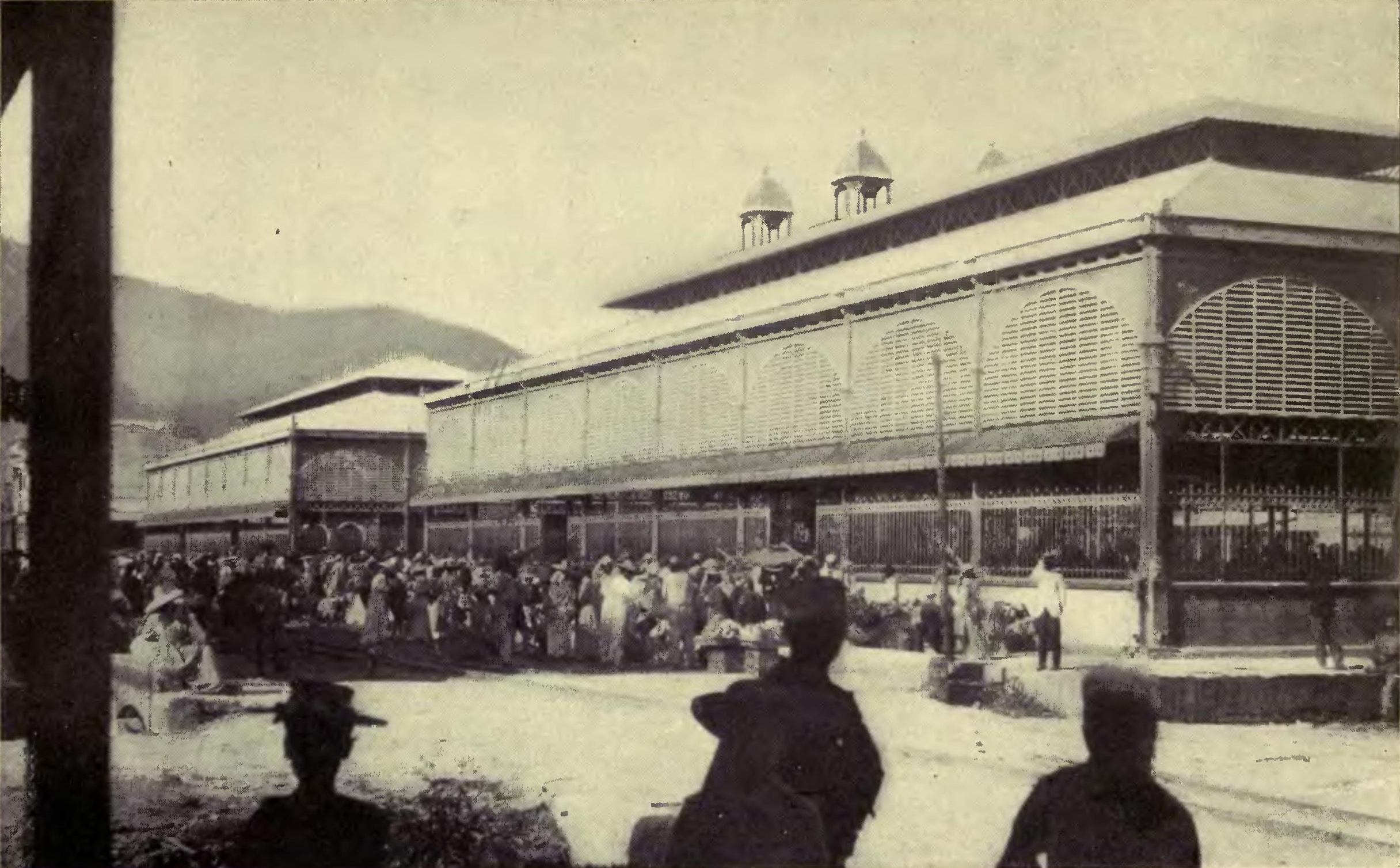
- Exterior view around 1907
- Interactive map of Iron Market
- Location: Port-au-Prince, Haiti
- Coordinates: 18.5515°N 72.3431°W
- Opening date: 1891–2008; 2011–present

Marché en Fer or Marché de Fer (English: Iron Market) also known as the Marché Hyppolite and the Marché Vallières is a public market in Haiti’s capital, Port‑au‑Prince. It was damaged by fire in 2008 and destroyed in the 2010 Haiti earthquake, but was restored. In February 2018 it burned again, with one of the two halls being destroyed.

== History ==
The Marché en Fer is a metal edifice that was built in Paris for a railway station in Cairo. When that plan was canceled, Haitian president Florvil Hyppolite purchased it and had it brought to Haiti in 1891.

The market consists of two iron‑framed halls, 2,000 m^{2} (22,000 sq ft) each, connected by a gate with four domed towers and with a clock on the gate’s façade. The entire structure is painted red, with green accents.

The market has burned several times; after a fire in 2008 it was abandoned. It was then completely destroyed by the 2010 Haiti earthquake.

Designated as a "historical heritage" by the Institut de Sauvegarde du Patrimoine National, it was rebuilt and reopened a year after the earthquake, with designs by John McAslan and the financial support of Irishman Denis O'Brien, owner of the mobile phone company Digicel, who invested US$12 million. Bricks recovered from buildings damaged in the earthquake were reused in reconstruction and the same French corporation that manufactured the original roof tiles made the replacements. The restored market was reopened in 2011 by Bill Clinton, former President of the United States.

On 13 February 2018, another fire, thought to have started in a rubbish container, destroyed one of the two halls.
