= Coat of arms of Haiti =

National coat of arms

- Armiger: Republic of Haiti
- Adopted: 1986
- Shield: A palm tree surmounted by a liberty cap on a stake, proper
- Supporters: A trophy of six rifles, six civil flags, two axes, two bugles, and a drum between two cannons pointing outwards on their gun-carriages, thereon two powder-bags, on the dexter one an infantry-hat, on the sinister one a cavalry-hat, between two piles of cannonballs and two anchors, all proper
- Compartment: A grassy ground, marked by two pennons, proper
- Motto: L'Union fait la force (French for 'Unity makes strength')

The coat of arms of Haiti is the national coat of arms of the Republic of Haiti. It was originally introduced in 1807, and it has appeared in its current form since 1986. Since this Haitian national symbol does not conform to the rules of heraldry for a traditional coat of arms, then it could be considered a national emblem instead (national emblem of Haiti).

== Overview ==
It has six draped flags of the country, three on each side, which are located behind a palm tree and cannons on a green lawn. Upon the lawn are various items, including a drum, bugles, cannonballs and ship anchors. Above the palm tree is a liberty cap placed as a symbol of freedom.

The ribbon bears the motto L'Union fait la force (French for 'Unity makes strength'), which is also the motto of several other countries. This should not be confused with the national motto of Haiti, which according to the Constitution of Haiti is Liberté, égalité, fraternité (French for 'Liberty, Equality, Fraternity').

== History ==
The oldest use of a symbol for Haiti is known since 1807. The symbol shows several national flags, with two cannons and palm trees. The symbol indicates the battle for independence of the republic. The motto, in French, means 'Strength through unity'. The use of the symbol was interrupted twice; once was during the period of Henri I. The then president Henri Christophe declared himself as the King of Haiti and adopted a Royal Coat of Arms. On the yellow shield of the arm there was a phoenix rising from its flames with five-pointed stars around it, and the motto Je renais de mes cendres (I will rise in my ashes) inscribed on a ribbon outlining the shield. Two royally crowned lions supported both sides of the shield, and the motto Dieu ma cause et mon épée (God, my cause and my sword) was placed on another ribbon at the bottom. In 1814 Henri I slightly changed his Royal Arm, the lions were removed and the motto was changed to a Latin one: Ex cineribus nascitur (Reborn from the ashes). Another change occurred in 1849, when President General Faustin Soulouque crowned himself as Emperor Faustin I. He adopted new Imperial arms, showing two cannons and a French imperial eagle. Two lions were again used as supporters and the whole was placed in a purple mantle, with a motto similar to the one Henri I used: Dieu, ma patrie et mon épée (God, my country and my sword). The emperor was forced to leave the country in 1859, and the old symbol was later restored. Ever since the composition has been the same, but the colors and items have changed somewhat.

The coat of arms is on the national flag of Haiti, but not on its civil flag.

== Historical coats of arms ==
=== Colonial period ===
Coat of arms before the French Revolution (1625–1803)

=== Independence period ===
Coat of arms of the First Empire of Haiti (1804-1806)

Coat of arms of the State of Haiti (1807–1811)

Coat of arms of the Republic of Haiti (1806–1820) and Republic of Haiti (1820–1849)

Coat of arms of the Kingdom of Haiti (1811–1814)

Coat of arms of the Kingdom of Haiti (1814–1820)

Coat of arms of the Second Empire of Haiti (1849–1859)

Coat of arms of the Republic of Haiti (1859–1964)

Coat of arms used by Duvalier (1964–1986)

== See also ==
- Flag of Haiti
- Seal and emblem of the United States Department of the Army
