= State of Haiti =

State in northwest Hispaniola from 1806 to 1811

State of Haiti État d'Haïti (French) Leta an Ayiti (Haitian Creole)
- 1807–1811
- Flag Coat of arms

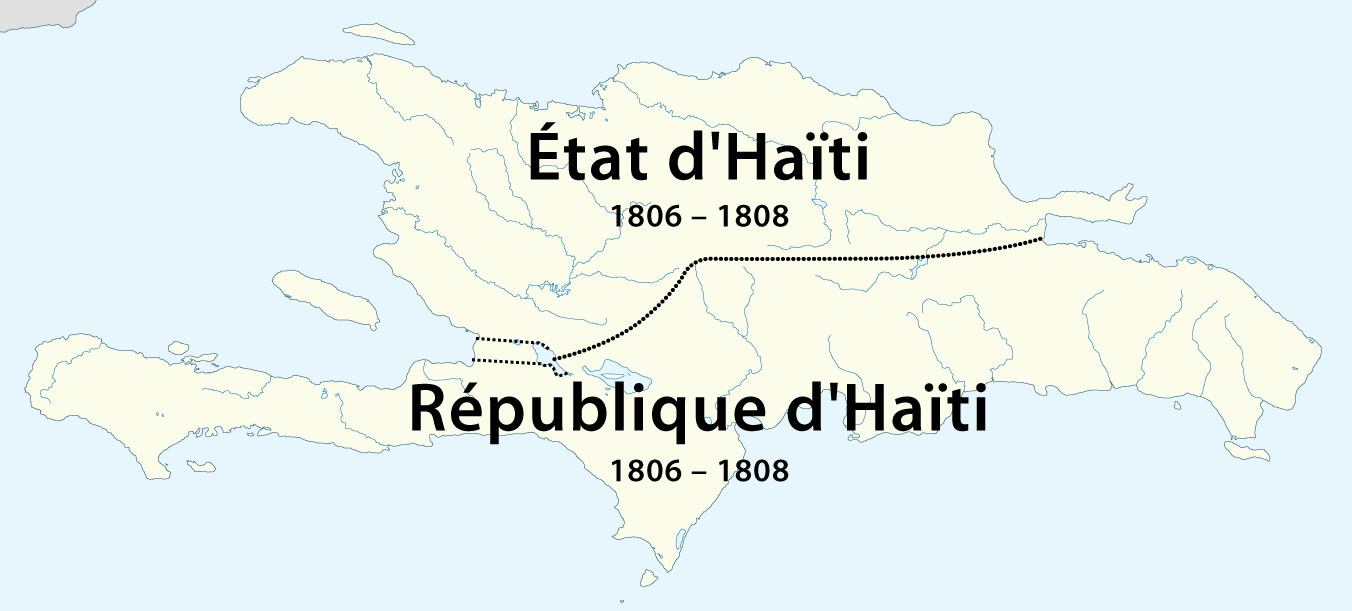
- The State of Haiti in the north of Hispaniola before 1808

- The State of Haiti in the north of Haiti from 1808
- Capital: Milot
- Common languages: French, Haitian Creole
- Religion: Roman Catholicism
- Demonym: Haitian
- Government: Autocracy
- President
  - 1807–1811: Henri Christophe
- History
  - Proclamation of the Constitution: 17 February 1807
  - Proclamation of Henri Christophe as King Henri I: 28 March 1811
- Currency: Haitian gourde
Preceded by	Succeeded by
First Empire of Haiti	Kingdom of Haiti
- Today part of: Dominican Republic; Haiti

The State of Haiti (French: État d'Haïti; Haitian Creole: Leta an Ayiti) was the name of the state in northern Haiti. It was created on 17 February 1807 following a failed coup by Henri Christophe against the Haitian Senate in the wake of the assassination of Emperor Jacques I and the overthrow of the First Empire of Haiti. It was ruled by Christophe as President of the State of Haiti. The 1807 constitution for the State made the post of president a position for life, with the president having the power to appoint his successor. On 28 March 1811 President Henri was proclaimed King Henri I, thereby dissolving the State of Haiti and creating the Kingdom of Haiti.

Following Christophe's coup attempt in 1806, the country was split. Parallel with the government of Christophe in the north, Alexandre Pétion, a free person of color, ruled over the south of the country as President of the Republic of Haiti until his death in 1818. He was succeeded by Jean-Pierre Boyer, who reunited the two parts of the nation after the deaths of Henri I and Henri I's son, Jacques-Victor Henry, in 1820.

== History ==
From 1791 to 1804, the Haitian revolution against the French colonists raged. After the failure of the French expedition to recapture the island, General Jean-Jacques Dessalines proclaimed Haiti's independence on 1 January 1804. Subsequently, on 8 October 1804, Dessalines was crowned emperor in Cap-Haitian as Jacques I.

In 1806 a rebellion instigated in the south of the country by discontent military officers and generals prompted Dessalines to assemble an army and march on Port-au-Prince to confront the rebels there, who had captured the city without a fight. This led to the assassination of Dessalines in a rebel ambush on 17 October 1806 at Pont-Rouge (today a part of Port-au-Prince). The rebel generals subsequently established a provisional government, of which Henri Christophe became the provisional chief of the executive. The other leaders of the rebellion included Étienne Élie Gerin, Dessalines' former minister of war, and Alexandre Pétion, Christophe's future rival and President of Haiti.

Discontent with the powers of the Haitian presidency under the draft of the 1806 constitution, Henri Christophe declared himself in rebellion against the Senate assembled in Port-au-Prince on 24 December 1806. He assembled an army and began marching on the capital with the intention of overthrowing the government and proclaiming himself at the head of a powerful executive. Nevertheless, he was still elected President of Haiti by the assembly before they were made aware of his rebellion. Government forces were warned and assembled under the command of Pétion and Gérin, fighting in the battle of Sibert and the siege of Port-au-Prince. Having failed to take the capital by force, Christophe was forced to retreat back north. There, he proclaimed the State of Haiti and inaugurated its constitution on 17 February 1807.

During this period, the French who remained in the eastern part of the island were defeated by the Hispanic-Creole inhabitants, under the command of Juan Sánchez Ramírez, at the battle of Palo Hincado on 7 November 1808. The French surrender in the eastern part of the island took place after the siege of Santo Domingo on 9 July 1809. The authorities then re-established the Spanish colony.

Having reached a certain stability, Christophe established a constitutional monarchy with himself as monarch. He became King of Haiti on 28 March 1811, under the regnal name of Henri I. On 2 June 1811, he was crowned by the Grand Archbishop Jean-Baptiste-Joseph Brelle. His reign came to an end following his suicide in the wake of a popular uprising in 1820.

== See also ==
- Kingdom of Haiti
- First Empire of Haiti
- Second Empire of Haiti
