= Second Empire of Haiti =

State in the Caribbean from 1849 to 1859

Empire of Haiti Empire d'Haïti (French) Anpi an Ayiti (Haitian Creole)
- 1849–1859
- Flag Imperial Coat of arms
- Motto: Dieu, Ma Patrie Et Mon Épée (French) "God, my fatherland and my sword"
- The Empire of Haiti
- Capital: Port-au-Prince
- Common languages: French, Haitian Creole
- Religion: Roman Catholicism (official)
- Government: Unitary ethnocratic semi-constitutional monarchy (de jure); Unitary absolute monarchy (de facto)
- Emperor
  - 1849–1859: Faustin I
- Legislature: Parliament
  - Upper Chamber: Senate
  - Lower Chamber: Chamber of Deputies
- History
  - Proclamation of Faustin Soulouque as Emperor Faustin I: 26 August 1849
  - Republic proclaimed: 15 January 1859
Preceded by	Succeeded by
Republic of Haiti (1820–1849)	Second Haitian Republic

The Second Empire of Haiti, officially known as the Empire of Haiti (French: Empire d'Haïti, Haitian Creole: Anpi an Ayiti), was a state which existed from 1849 to 1859. It was established by the then-President, former Lieutenant General and Supreme Commander of the Presidential Guards under President Riché, Faustin Soulouque, who, inspired by Napoleon, declared himself Emperor Faustin I on 26 August 1849 at the Cathedral of Our Lady of the Assumption in Port-au-Prince.

Faustin's unsuccessful invasions (in part due to the diplomatic interference of the United States and Spain) in an attempt to reconquer the Dominican Republic (in 1849, 1850, 1855 and 1856), which had declared independence from Haiti in 1844, undermined his control over the country.

In 1858, a revolution began, led by General Fabre Geffrard, Duke of Tabara. In December of that year, Geffrard defeated the Imperial Army and seized control of most of the country. As a result, the Emperor abdicated his throne on 15 January 1859. Refused aid by the French Legation, Faustin was taken into exile aboard a British warship on 22 January 1859. General Geffrard succeeded him as President. Soon afterwards, the Emperor and his family arrived in Kingston, Jamaica, where they remained for several years. Allowed to return to Haiti, Faustin died at Petit-Goâve on 6 August 1867 and was buried at Fort Soulouque.

== End of the republic ==
On 1 March 1847, General Faustin Soulouque was elected President of the Republic by the Senate and succeeded President Riché, who died in office. During his tenure, the latter had acted as a straw man for the Boyerist ruling class, who immediately sought a replacement. His attention quickly turned to Faustin Soulouque, in whom most saw someone a little withdrawn and ignorant. The 65-year-old seemed like a malleable candidate and was therefore driven to accept the role that was being offered to him. He was sworn in on 2 March 1847.

At first, Faustin seemed to play the role of his puppet appropriately. He kept the former president's ministers in office and continued the program of his predecessor. However, it was not long before he got rid of his followers and became the absolute master of the Haitian state. According to Mark Kurlansky's book A Continent Of Islands: Searching For The Caribbean Destiny “he organized a private militia, the Zinglins, and had all those who opposed him arrested and massacred, especially the mulattoes, particularly the mulattoes, consolidating thus its power over the government”. This process, which included a massacre of mulattoes in Port-au-Prince on 16 April 1848, culminated in the Senate and Chamber of Deputies where he was proclaimed Emperor of Haiti on 26 August 1849.

Soulouque also invited the black inhabitants of Louisiana to emigrate to Haiti. An Afro-Creole native of New Orleans who had grown up in Haiti, Emile Desdunes, worked as Soulouque's agent and, in 1859, arranged the free transportation to Haiti of at least 350 desperate people. Many of these refugees would return to Louisiana later.

Soulouque's reign was marked by violent repression against the opposition and numerous assassinations. During his reign, Soulouque was affected by prejudice, hatred and discrimination against the Creoles (the same sentiments obviously reflected).

== Empire ==
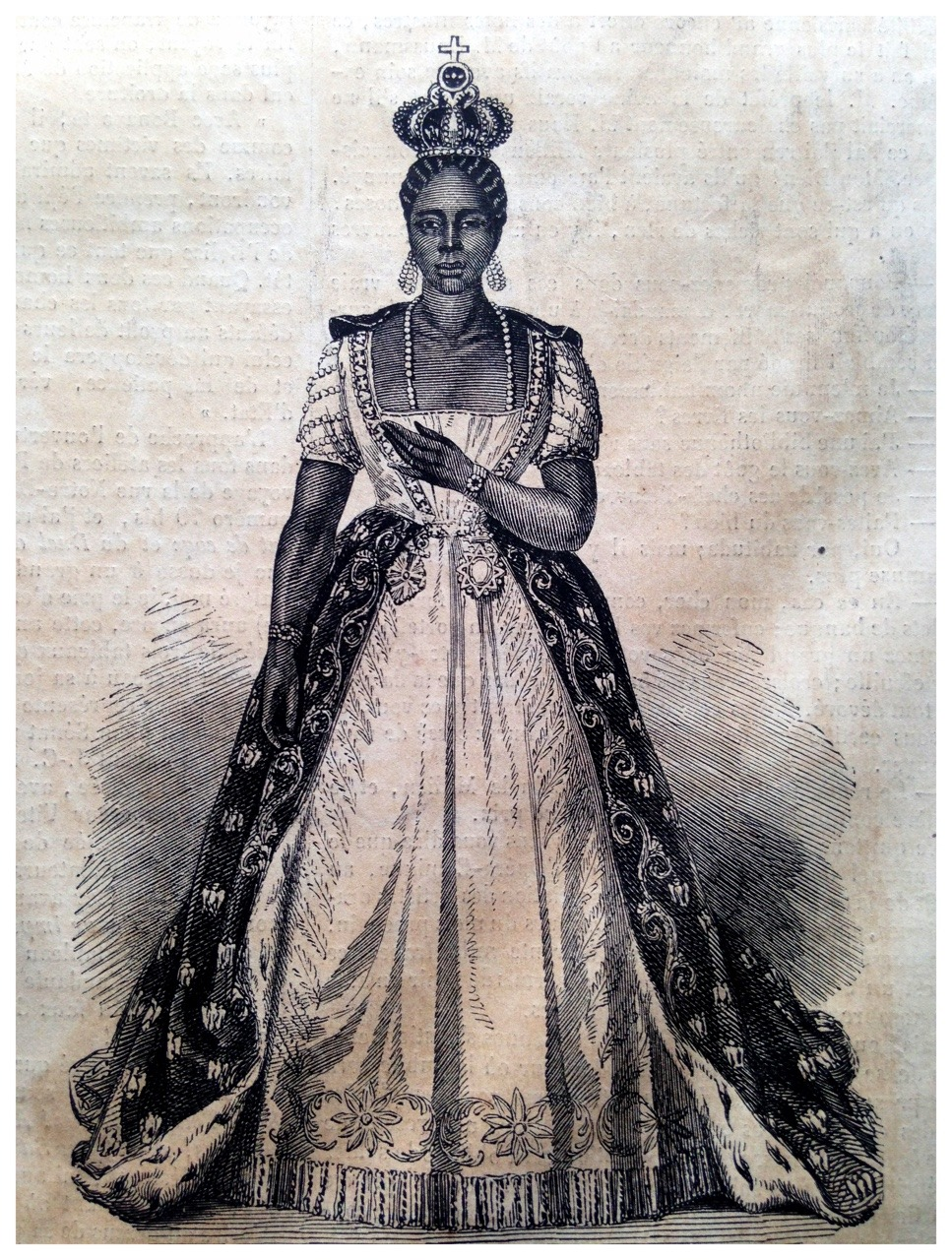
Adélina Lévêque, Empress of Haiti, c.1859

=== Coronation ===
On 25 August 1849, Soulouque was proclaimed emperor by Parliament under the name of Faustin I. His coronation took place on 18 April 1852, in a ruinous splendor for the finances of this country, and the payment of the debt had to be interrupted. Soulouque paid £2,000 for his crown and £30,000 for the rest of the accessories (according to Sir Spenser St John, British chargé d'affaires in Haiti in the 1860s, on his account: "Hayti ou La République noire", pp. 95 –96).

Gustave d'Alaux describes this fact in his book Soulouque et son empire: “His imperial majesty summoned the principal merchant of Port-au-Prince one morning and ordered him to immediately order in Paris a costume, identical to that of Napoleon's coronation. Faustin I also commissioned a crown, one for the empress, a scepter, a globe, a hand of justice, a throne and all other accessories, such as those used during Napoleon's coronation. "

In December 1849, Faustin married his lifelong partner, Adélina Lévêque. On 18 April 1852, in the capital, Port-au-Prince, the emperor and empress were crowned in a huge and sumptuous ceremony, like the coronation of the emperor of the French.

The emperor made a speech and concluded with: “Long live freedom, long live love!" (Gustave d'Alaux). The coronation is illustrated in the "Imperial Album of Haiti", engraved by Severyn, published in New York, 1852 (available at the British Library).

=== Politics ===
To affirm his legitimacy, Faustin brought the sons of the first emperor, Jean-Jacques Dessalines, back to Haiti. He restored the title of "prince" and "princess" to them, and offered a pension to the former empress Marie-Claire Bonheur.

Later, he organized a violent repression against the mulattoes and imposed absolutism upon the island. The imperial constitution, which he himself drew up, proclaimed a hereditary empire. As the only son of the Emperor died in 1849, the succession passed instead to Prince Mainville-Joseph, a son of the Emperor's brother, Grand Duke Juan José. To have offspring on the throne, Faustin arranged the marriage of his eldest daughter, Princess Olive Soulouque, to her cousin Prince Mainville-Joseph. The couple went on to have three children.

=== War against the Dominican Republic ===
The emperor's foreign policy focused on preventing foreign intrusion into the politics and sovereignty of Haiti. The independence of the Dominican Republic (then called Santo Domingo), according to him, posed a direct threat to Haiti.

In 1849, Soulouque launched his first invasion of the Dominican Republic, but his army fled not due to defeat but instead due to lack of food and supplies. In 1850 there was a second invasion, in which Haiti was stopped by the force of France, the United Kingdom and the United States. In the third and last invasion, in 1855, Soulouque entered the Dominican Republic outnumbered due to many of the men in the army abandoning him before they reached Dominican Republic. During his three expeditions, he had to face General Pedro Santana, who was then in command of the Dominican Republic.

=== Nobility ===
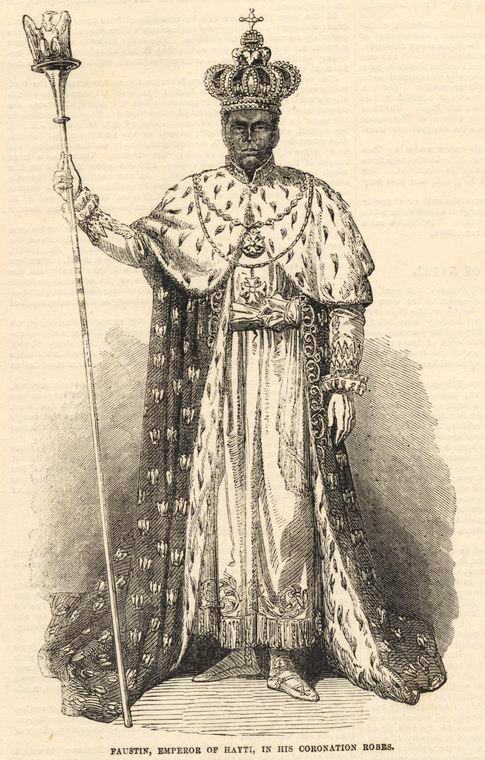
Emperor Faustin I of Haiti

The emperor tried to create a strong centralized government that, while retaining a deeply Haitian character, was heavily inspired by European traditions, especially the Napoleonic Empire. One of his first acts after being declared emperor was to establish a new nobility. The Constitution of 20 September 1849, granted the emperor the right to create hereditary titles and to grant other honors to his subjects. Volumes 5 and 6 of The National by John Saunders and Westland Marston (published in 1859) explain that the Empire consisted of 59 dukes, 90 counts, 30 knights, and 250 barons. This new nobility also included the old nobility of the First Empire and the Northern Kingdom. The first patent letters were issued by Soulouque on 21 December 1850. Other sources add "three hundred knights" and "four hundred nobles" to this list.

== The fall of the Empire ==
=== Revolution ===
In 1858, a revolution led by General Fabre Geffrard, Duke of Tabara and former loyal follower of the emperor, began. In December of that same year, Geffrard defeated the imperial army and took control of most of the country. On the night of 20 December 1858, Geffrard left Port-au-Prince in a small boat, accompanied by his son and two faithful disciples, Ernest Roumain and Jean-Bart. On 22 December, he arrived in Gonaïves, where the insurrection broke out. A Republic was proclaimed and the Constitution of 1846 was adopted.

On 23 December, the departmental committee of Gonaïves, which had been organized for that purpose, decreed the abolition of the Empire and the arrest of several members of the imperial family. Cap-Haïtien and the whole department of Artibonite joined the restoration of the Republic. The days of December 1858 and January 1859 weakened the country considerably. The imperial troops, although exhausted and defeated several times by the revolutionaries, continued to fight against the insurrection. The revolutionaries then took the name of "Geffrardists" and demanded the arrest and trial of the emperor.

=== Abdication and exile ===
On 15 January 1859, the imperial palace was attacked and the emperor was forced to abdicate the same day. He was exiled with his family aboard a British warship on 22 January 1859. General Geffrard was then elected President of the Republic. Shortly thereafter, the emperor and his family arrived in Kingston, Jamaica. Authorized to return to Haiti by the government of Sylvain Salnave, Faustin died at Petit-Goâve on 6 August 1867 and was buried at Fort Soulouque.

== See also ==
- History of Haiti
- First Empire of Haiti
