= Jérôme-Maximilien Borgella =

Haitian politician and military leader (1773–1844)

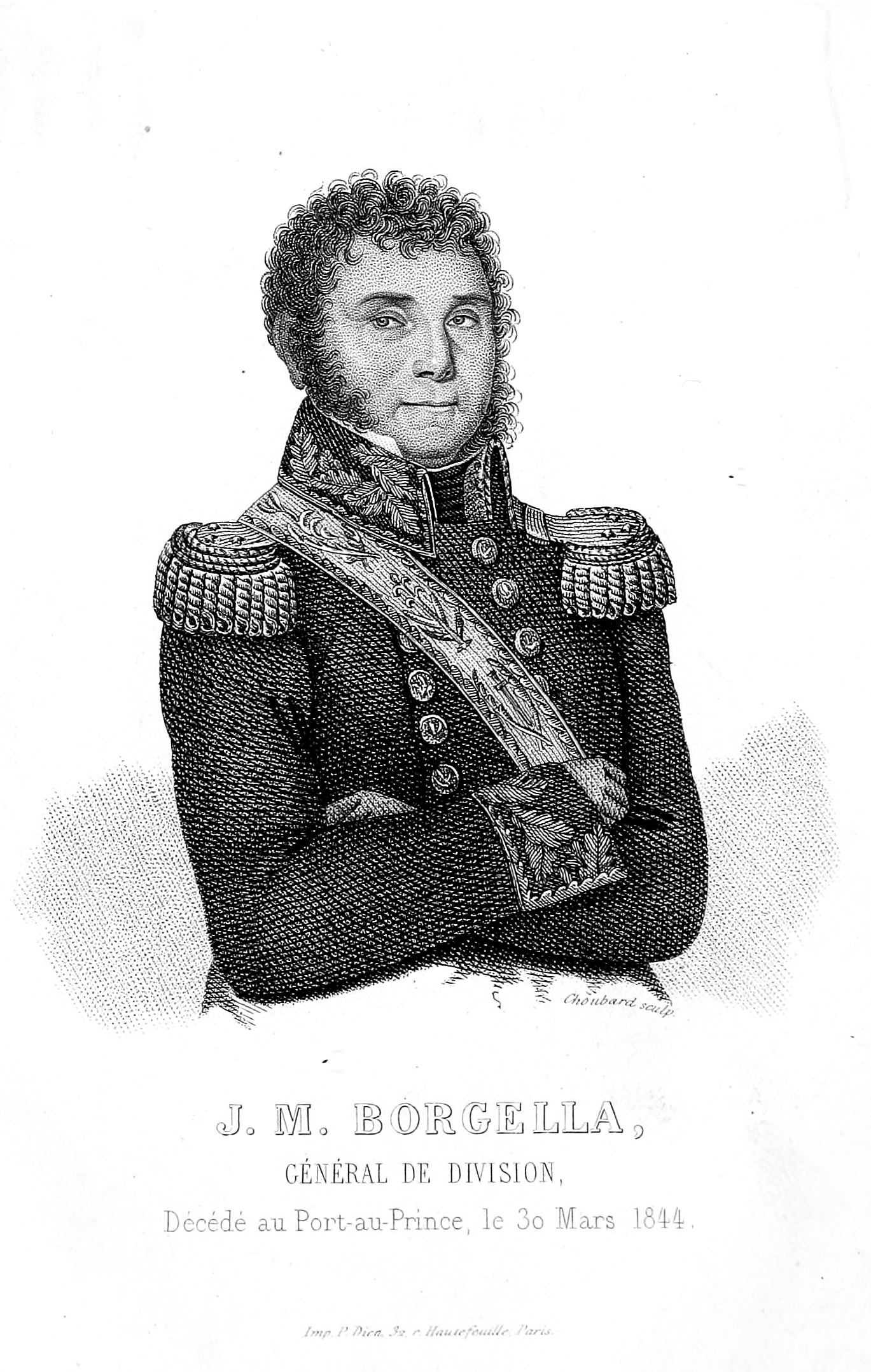
- 1853 portrait of Borgella
- Born: June 5, 1773; Port-au-Prince, Haiti
- Died: March 30, 1844 (aged 70) Port-au-Prince, Haiti
- Allegiance: France; Haiti
- Branch: French Army (Haiti) Haitian Army
- Service years: 1789-1843
- Rank: General
- Conflicts: Haitian Revolution

Jérôme-Maximilien Borgella (June 5, 1773 – March 30, 1844) was a Haitian general and politician. A veteran from the Haitian Revolution, he held prominent positions during the respective administrations of Alexandre Pétion and Jean-Pierre Boyer. During the latter's administration, who had oversaw a military occupation in eastern Hispaniola, he maintained neutral support for the regime, which came to an end in 1844, the year of Borgella's death.

== Family ==
He was born on June 5, 1773, in Port-au-Prince. Due to the ancestry of his mother, a free woman of color, Borgella could not legally use the name of his father, who was white; but he obtained that right on the proclamation of equality on April 4, 1792.

After receiving some education he entered a carpenter's shop to learn that trade in 1786.

== Revolution ==
In 1789, the French Revolution erupted in France, causing massive unrest that would stretch throughout its colonies. That same year, he joined the mulatto insurgents and fought against the Negroes and the whites; but the black troops under Toussaint Louverture prevailed, and Borgella suffered persecution. Eventually, an expeditionary force sent by Napoleon I arrived in Saint-Domingue in 1802, which ended in the deposition of Toussaint from power and restored French authority in the colony. Borgella, like his fellow mixed raced contemporaries, Alexandre Pétion and Jean-Pierre Boyer, served in the French army for some time, but returned to the revolutionary party and distinguished himself by his bravery and his generosity toward the vanquished, a trait in which he displayed during the final skirmishes of the Haitian Revolution. (When the new leader, Jean-Jacques Dessalines, ordered the massacre of whites in Haiti, Borgella was said to have saved many whites from the ensuing genocide).

== Later career and death ==
After Haiti became independent in 1804, He took an active and important part in the civil wars during the early period of the republic, of which he was appointed president by the assembly as successor of Andre Rigaud, who died on September 18, 1811. then submitted to Alexandre Pétion on March 20, 1812. Borgella afterward filled the highest offices in the army, in the chambers, and in several departments of the government, during Boyer's administration. President Jean-Pierre Boyer then entrusted him with important commands and he remained loyal to him until his death in 1844.

== Bibliography ==
- Beaubrun Ardouin, Studies on the history of Haiti, followed by the life of General Borgella, 1853
- (en) Prosper Avril, From glory to disgrace: the Haitian army, 1804–1994, Parkland, Universal Publishers, 1999, 413 pp. ( ISBN 978-1-581-12836-9 and 978-1-581-12836-9, OCLC 43648857 ), p. 46.

== See also ==
- Alexandre Pétion
- André Riguad
- Jean-Pierre Boyer
