= First Empire of Haiti =

State in the Caribbean from 1804 to 1806

Empire of Haiti Empire d'Haïti (French) Anpi an Ayiti (Haitian Creole)
- 1804–1806
- Flag Coat of arms
- Motto: Liberté ou la Mort! (French) "Liberty or Death!"
- Territory of the Empire of Haiti (1804–1806), located on the western portion of the island of Hispaniola. To the east, on the other side of the border, is the Spanish colony of Santo Domingo, under French control (1795–1809). The border that divides the island on the map is the border of the Treaty of Aranjuez of 1777.
- Capital: Port-au-Prince
- Official languages: French
- Common languages: Haitian Creole
- Religion: Roman Catholicism
- Demonym: Haitian
- Government: Unitary elective absolute monarchy
- Emperor
  - 1804–1806: Jacques I
- History
  - Independence: 1 January 1804
  - Proclamation of Jean-Jacques Dessalines as Emperor Jacques I: 22 September 1804
  - Assassination of Emperor Jacques I: 17 October 1806
- Currency: Haitian livre
Preceded by	Succeeded by
Saint-Domingue	State of Haiti; Republic of Haiti
- Today part of: Haiti

The First Empire of Haiti, officially known as the Empire of Haiti (French: Empire d'Haïti; Haitian Creole: Anpi an Ayiti), was an elective monarchy in North America. Haiti was controlled by France before declaring independence on 1 January 1804. The Governor-General of Haiti, Jean-Jacques Dessalines, created the empire on 22 September 1804. After being proclaimed emperor by the Generals of the Haitian Revolution Army, he held his coronation ceremony on 6 October and took the name Jacques I. The constitution of 20 May 1805 set out the way the empire was to be governed, with the country split into six military divisions. The general of each division corresponded directly with the emperor or the general in chief appointed by the emperor. The constitution also set out the succession to the throne, with the crown being elective and the reigning emperor having the power to appoint his successor. The constitution also banned white people, with the exception of naturalised Germans and Poles, from owning property inside the empire.

Jacques I was assassinated on 17 October 1806. Two members of his administration, Alexandre Pétion and Henri Christophe, then assumed power, which led to a split in the country – with Pétion leading the southern Republic of Haiti and Christophe leading the northern State of Haiti (later Kingdom of Haiti). Some 43 years later, President Faustin Soulouque established the Second Empire of Haiti, which lasted between 1849 and 1859.

== History ==
Fearing the return of the French to the island, Dessalines and Henri Christophe built forts to fend them off.

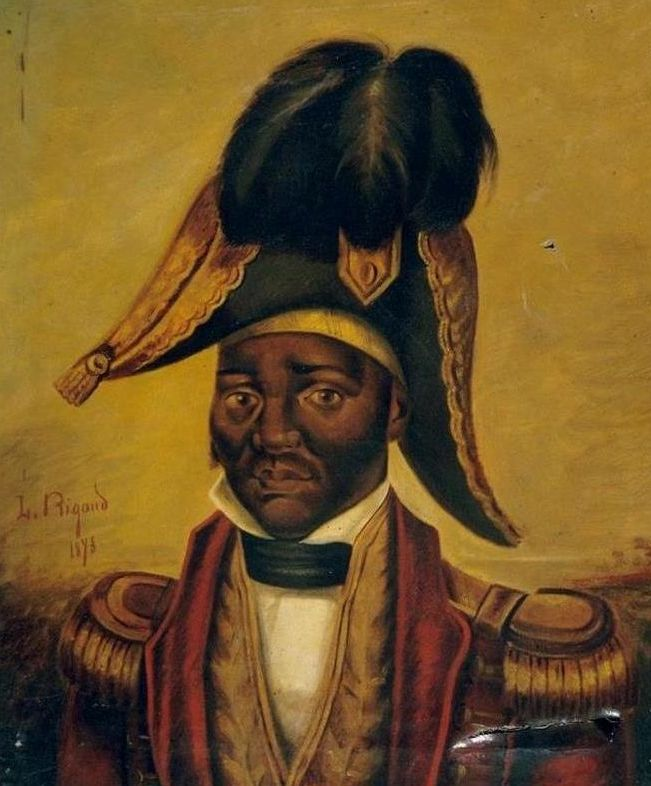
Emperor Jacques I of the First Empire of Haiti

On October 8, 1804, he was crowned Emperor under the name of Jacques I of Haiti, in Cap-Haïtien under the title His Majesty Jacques I, Emperor.

At the end of February 1805, Jean-Jacques Dessalines and his troops left in two directions: one part towards the north (Dajabón-Santiago-La Vega-Saint Domingue) commanded by Henri Christophe, and another towards the south (Hinche-San Juan de la Maguana-Azua-Baní-Saint-Domingue) commanded by Dessalines himself.

On February 25, 1805, Dessalines at the head of 30,000 men captured Santiago. On the southern road, the Haitian emperor realized that the inhabitants of San Juan de la Maguana and Baní had evacuated their city to protect themselves, so he reckoned that the indigenous population did not deserve his clemency. On March 6, while approaching the capital, he ordered to set fire to the city of San Carlos on the outskirts of Santo Domingo and to begin the siege of the city. On March 25, Dessalines ordered the total extermination of the white population under his control. These populations of white descent were then deported to the large cities of Haiti where they were killed in public places by being crushed (by horses or beasts of burden) and quartered.

Three days later, three frigates and two French brigantines arrived in Santo Domingo. Dessalines abandoned the siege of Santo Domingo and retreated to Haiti. In April 1805, Dessalines, Christophe and their troops razed Santiago, Moca, La Vega, Azua, San Juan de la Maguana, Baní, among others, and massacred the inhabitants who had not fled to the Central Cordillera. Approximately 10,000 people were thus killed. These massacres laid the foundation for two centuries of animosity between the two countries. On May 20, 1805, Dessalines adopted a new flag, as he changed the blue and red horizontal band that was used as the French tricolor into black and red vertical flag which has symbolized the strong ties to Africa between black (death) and red (freedom), which was later used by Henri Christophe in the Northern Kingdom of Haiti, when he proclaimed himself as Henri I: King of Haiti. 160 years later, the Haitian dictator François Duvalier (Papa Doc) became President for life of which he won 99% of the vote with a Legislature of 58 deputies throughout Haiti and returned to Dessalines' black and red design. They included the national coat of arms, but altered the flags in its trophy to black as well.

The French kept the eastern part until the Spanish victory at Palo Hincado on 7 November 1808, and the surrender of Santo Domingo on 9 July 1809; the Spanish emerged victorious thanks to assistance from the British.

At the same time Dessalines officialized the French language, even though the vast majority of the population spoke only Creole.

He confiscated the settlers' lands and gave the best to his officers. To revive the economy, he decreed forced labor for farmers with a regulation harder than that of Toussaint. The people took up arms again against this dictatorship.

It was in Marchand on 16 October 1806 that Dessalines learned of the revolt. Unaware that Christophe had been proclaimed head of the insurrection, he wrote to him to be ready to enter the countryside. To General Pétion, who also took part in the conspiracy, he gave the order to march on Les Cayes at the head of the troops of the Second Western Division.

On 17 October 1806 Jean-Jacques Dessalines was assassinated in Pont-Rouge, north of Port-au-Prince, by his collaborators, Alexandre Pétion, Jean-Pierre Boyer, André Rigaud and Bruno Blanchet.

After Dessalines' assassination the country split in two under the authority of his former generals: Henri Christophe, elected president with limited powers, tried to impose himself, but clashed with Alexandre Pétion, who defended the capital Port-au-Prince. Christophe returned to Cap-Haïtien, in the north, where he became president for life. In the south, the senate elected Pétion as president of the Republic.

== See also ==
- History of Haiti
- Second Empire of Haiti
