= Jean-Baptiste Riché =

President of Haiti from 1846 to 1847

6th President of Haiti
- In office March 1, 1846 – February 27, 1847
- Preceded by: Jean-Louis Pierrot
- Succeeded by: Faustin Soulouque

Count of Grande-Riviere-du-Nord
- In office March 28, 1811 – October 18, 1820
- Succeeded by: Kingdom abolished

Personal details
- Born: 1780 Grande-Rivière-du-Nord, Saint-Domingue
- Died: February 27, 1847 (aged 66 or 67) Port-au-Prince, Haiti
- Spouse: Countess Laurence Raphael
- Children: 1
- Profession: Military (divisional general)

Jean-Baptiste Riché, Count of Grande-Riviere-du-Nord (French pronunciation: [ʒɑ̃ batist ʁiʃe]; 1780 – February 27, 1847) was a career officer and general in the Haitian Army. He was made President of Haiti on March 1, 1846.

== Early life ==
Riché was born free, the son of a prominent free black man of the same name in the North Province of Saint-Domingue (the French colony that later became Haiti). His father was a sergeant in the colonial militia and probably served in the rebel forces. Riché himself joined the Haitian Revolutionaries probably some time in 1801.

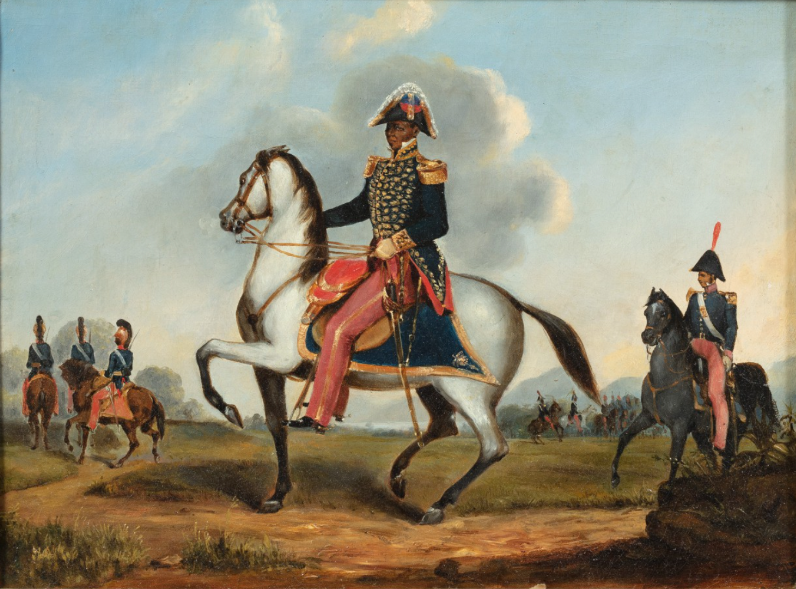
Riché as General and Count of Grande-Riviere-du-Nord (Johann Gottfried Eiffe, 1817)

After Haiti gained independence at the end of the revolution in 1803, Riché joined the forces of Henri Christophe, who in 1807 promoted him to the rank of general and deputy commander of his army. During the civil war that followed between Alexandre Pétion and Christophe, Riché was instrumental in Christophe's victory at the Battle of Siebert on January 1, 1807. During the siege of Port-au-Prince in 1811, Riché commanded the left wing of Christophe's army.

A loyal officer, Riché quickly became one of Christophe's most trusted commanders, and as a consequence he was placed in command of Haïti's Northern Province, where he was effective in subduing the mulatto population. He was instrumental in defeating the Piquet Revolt of 1844.

When Christophe became King in 1811, He proclaimed him Count of Grande-Riviere-du-Nord. When the Kingdom of Haiti was abolished in 1820 after Prince Jacques-Victor Henry's death, he lost his title.

== Presidency ==
After Christophe's downfall in 1820, Riché supported the new government and was therefore able to retain his post during the subsequent administration of Jean-Pierre Boyer, and those that followed. This continued until Jean-Louis Pierrot became President of Haïti in 1845. Pierrot attempted to reform the Haitian government, causing the Boyerist hierarchy of Haiti to sponsor a rebellion in the provinces of Port-au-Prince and Artibonite in 1846.

The rebel army under mulatto control proclaimed Riché president of Haiti on March 1, 1846. After much of the Haitian army sided with the rebels, President Pierrot relinquished his office on March 24, 1846. After gaining the presidency of Haiti, one of Riché's first acts was to restore the Constitution of 1816.

As president, Riché was considered a failure by his Boyerist backers. Originally intended to be a figurehead, being one-eyed, illiterate, and approaching 70 years old, Riché quickly began to take an active role. He soon proposed reforms similar to those espoused by former President Pierrot.

Riché also vigorously persecuted members of the vodou sect, in support of the dominant Roman Catholic religion.

He died on February 27, 1847, possibly from being poisoned, although this has never been established, and one report was that he died by voluntarily taking an aphrodisiac, Cantharides.

Riché's presidency, considered ineffective by historians, opened the way for considerable changes in the political landscape of Haiti during the succeeding administrations. As a result, his presidency can be considered a turning point in the history of Haitian politics.

After Riché's death in 1847, he was replaced by Faustin-Élie Soulouque, who was anticipated to be similar to Riché. Soulouque later appointed himself Emperor Faustin I.

Preceded by Jean-Louis Pierrot; President of Haïti	President of Haiti; 1846–47	Succeeded by Faustin Soulouque; President of Haïti
