= Françoise-Améthyste Christophe =

- Princess Royal of Haiti
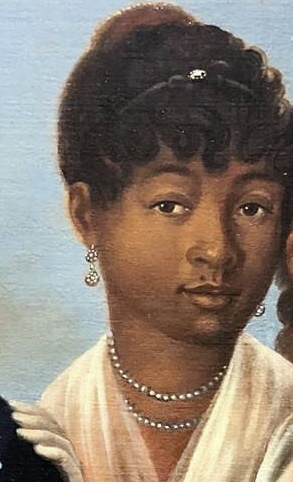
- The Princess Royal, detail from the portrait of the children of King Henry I of Haiti, by an unknown artist, c. 1811

Princess Royal of Haiti
- Tenure: 1811–1820
- Born: 9 May 1798; Cap-Français, Saint-Domingue
- Died: 15 October 1831 (aged 33); Pisa, Grand Duchy of Tuscany
Names
- Françoise-Améthyste Christophe
- House: Christophe
- Father: Henry I of Haiti
- Mother: Marie-Louise Coidavid

Françoise-Améthyste Christophe (French: Françoise-Améthyste Christophe; Cap-Français, 9 May 1798 – Pisa, 15 October 1831) was a Haitian royal and the Princess Royal of Haiti, the eldest daughter of King Henry I and his queen consort, Marie-Louise Coidavid.

== Biography ==
Françoise-Améthyste Christophe was born on 9 May 1798 in Cap-Français (modern-day Cap-Haïtien), in the former French colony of Saint-Domingue. At the time of her birth, her father, Henry Christophe, was a general and leader in the Haitian fight for independence, while her mother managed the family estate in Saint-Michel-de-l'Attalaye.

In 1811, her father declared himself King of the newly established Kingdom of Haiti. On 2 June that year, King Henry, Queen Marie-Louise, and their son, Jacques-Victor Henry, then seven years old, participated in a grand coronation ceremony. Françoise-Améthyste and her younger sister, Anne-Athénaïre, traveled in a separate carriage pulled by six horses. The coronation, held during a lengthy and opulent Sunday mass, was officiated by Father Cornélie Brelle, a French priest from Brittany who had previously served as Apostolic Prefect during Henry's presidency.

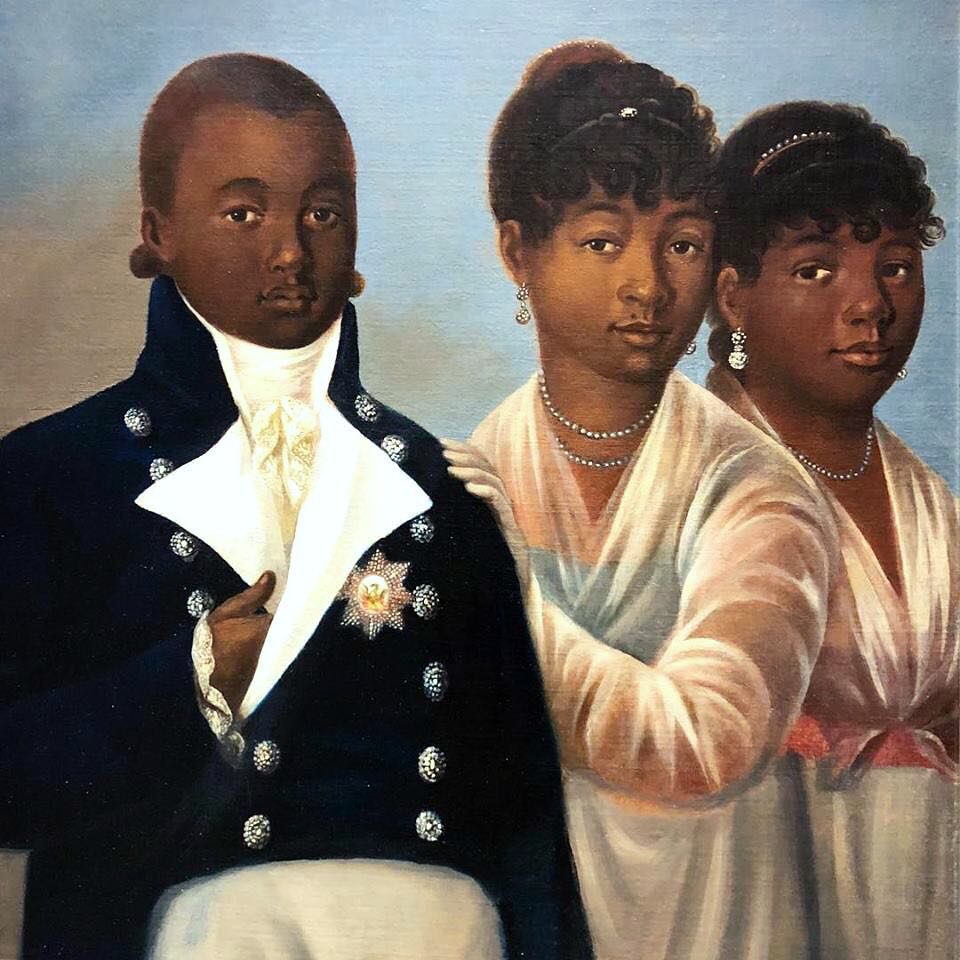
Portrait of King Henry's children: Prince Jacques-Victor Henry and Princesses Françoise-Améthyste and Anne-Athénaïre, by an unknown artist, c. 1811.

Following her father's coronation, Améthyste was granted the title of "Princess Royal" and, as the eldest daughter, was referred to at court as Madame Première. The Countess of Ouanaminthe was appointed as her governess and oversaw her formal education.

In 1812, as the Kingdom of Haiti remained in tension with the southern republic, one of the king’s most prized warships, the Princess Royal (also called the Royal Améthyste), named in her honor, was dispatched alongside two others to patrol the southern coast. The ship was captured and handed over to the Republic in what was believed to be a betrayal involving a man named Paparelli, who was later executed by the king. The British frigate HMS Southampton, in consultation with President Alexandre Pétion, attacked the vessel at Miragoâne, but it was later recaptured by Henry’s forces and brought to Port-au-Prince. These events heightened tensions and fueled fears of northern aggression, exacerbating the division between monarchy and republic.

Rumors circulated in Europe that Françoise-Améthyste, or her sister Anne-Athénaïre, might marry Prince Pedro of Braganza. The monarchist Parisian newspaper Le Drapeau Blanc reportedly omitted a news item about him marrying a princess, daughter of the black Christophe of Haiti:

"Don Pedro was avenged of all refusals and insults. Le Drapeau Blanc, from Paris, did not report that he was going to marry a princess, daughter of the black Christophe of Haiti, so as not to contradict the color of the ladies of the Brazilian court? Despite the unfavorable reputation he had gained in Europe, he could boast of having made a good marriage, fulfilling at least three of the four conditions required to obtain a bride in Europe and not in Haiti."

However, it is suggested that the supposed union with a princess from Haiti was never seriously discussed and served only as a way to ridicule both Haiti—the first modern Western country to have a black head of state—and Brazil, due to its ethnically mixed population and for having received the Portuguese royal family on its territory after the transfer of the court to Rio de Janeiro, fleeing Napoleon’s troops.

By 1820, after years of increasingly autocratic rule, King Henry faced rebellion. Rather than risk being overthrown, he took his own life with a silver bullet. According to reports, his teenage children, Françoise-Améthyste, Anne-Athénaïre, and Jacques-Victor, knelt beside him in grief. The queen was said to be overcome with sorrow, praying silently by his body.

Shortly after, Améthyste’s brother, the 16-year-old Prince Jacques-Victor Henry, was captured and killed by revolutionaries, reportedly stabbed with bayonets, at the Sans-Souci Palace.

In August 1821, Améthyste, along with her mother and sister, went into exile under the protection of the British Royal Navy, traveling to London. However, the harsh climate and pollution of industrial England harmed Améthyste’s health.

By 1824, the family had relocated to Pisa in the Grand Duchy of Tuscany (modern-day Italy), where Améthyste died on 15 October 1831, reportedly due to complications from an enlarged heart.
