= Pompée Valentin Vastey =

Haitian writer and politician (1781–1820)

Pompée Valentin Vastey (French: [vastɛ]; 1781–1820), or Pompée Valentin, Baron de Vastey, was a Haitian writer, educator, and politician. Vastey was of mixed African and European ancestry (called "mulatto" at the time) born to a white French father and a black Haitian mother.

He served as secretary to King Henri Christophe and tutor to Christophe's son, Victor Henri. Vastey also claimed to have fought in Toussaint's army and is said to have been the second cousin of the French novelist and playwright Alexandre Dumas (Daut 56; see also, Griggs 181).

Vastey is best known for his essays on the history and contemporary circumstances of Haiti.

== Biography ==
Jean-Louis Vastey was born in 1781 in Ennery in the French colony of Saint-Domingue. In 1777, his father, Jean-Valentin Vastey, originally from Jumièges, in Normandy, had married Élisabeth Dumas. Some historians give her as the sister of Marie-Cessette Dumas, mother of General Thomas Alexandre Dumas and grandmother of the writer Alexandre Dumas, a hypothesis refuted by her biographer who, moreover, demonstrates that Vastey never bore the first name of Pompey-Valentin but that of Jean-Louis.

In 1804, the year of Haiti's self-proclaimed independence, Jean-Louis Vastey was head of office for the Minister of Finance, André Vernet, under the government of Jean-Jacques Dessalines.

In 1806, Dessalines was assassinated. Vastey remained André Vernet's secretary in the Department of Finance and the Interior.

In 1807, Henri Christophe founded a republic in the north of the island. In the wake of Minister Vernet, Vastey went into the service of Christophe.

On March 26, 1811, Henri Christophe proclaimed himself king of Haiti (Henri I). Vastey is appointed secretary of the Legislative Commission responsible for preparing the Henry Code while his mentor, André Vernet, will be made Prince of Gonaïves.

In 1814, on the death of the Prince of Gonaïves, Vastey was promoted to private secretary to the king and became tutor to the Prince Royal Jacques-Victor Henri. He is raised to the rank of baron. It was from this time that Vastey worked to defend the Haitian monarchy in writing against the dreaded return of the French. That year, he published Notes à M le baron de VP Malouet and especially Le Système Colonial Dévoilé (The Colonial System Unveiled), which lists the abuses committed by the former colonists and the list of the names of the torturers. This book is considered his major work.

Baron de Vastey will also exercise his talents against the Haitian Republic of the South presided over by General Pétion (Le Cri de la conscience, and Le Cri de la patrie, 1815).

In 1816 and 1817, Baron de Vastey continued his war of the pen with France by publishing Reflections on a Letter from Mazères then Political Reflections on Some French Books and Journals Concerning Haiti.

On August 20, 1819, he was made a knight of the Royal and Military Order of Saint-Henri and was appointed Field Marshal and Chancellor. He published his last work that year: Essay on the causes of the revolution and civil wars in Haiti.

On October 8, 1820, there was a popular insurrection against the king. The insurgents attacked the Sans Souci Palace in Milot and King Henri Christophe committed suicide. The next day, the crowd arrested Vastey, the two royal princes and other notables, all of whom were executed a few days later. The heroic attitude of the baron in the face of death has been reported by witnesses.

Most of his works were republished by Nabu Press in 2010, some of which were translated into English.

== Selected works ==
- Le Système Colonial Dévoilé (1814)
- Notes à M. le Baron de V. P. Malouet... en réfutation du 4ème volume de son ouvrage, intitulé: Collection de mémoires sur les colonies, et particulièrement sur Saint-Domingue (1814)
- Le Cri de la Patrie, ou Les intérêts de tous les Haytiens (1815)
- Le Cri de la Conscience, ou Réponse à un écrit, imprimé au Port-au-Prince, intitulé: Le peuple de la République d’Hayti, à Messieurs Vastey et Limonade (1815)
- Réflexions adressées aux Haïtiens de partie de l'Ouest et du Sud sur l’horrible assassinat du Général Delvare... (1816)
- Réflexions sur une lettre de Mazères : ex-colon français, adressée à M. J.C.L. Sismonde de Sismondi, sur les noirs et les blancs, la civilisation de l'Afrique, le royaume d'Hayti, etc. (English: Reflexions on the Blacks and Whites: Remarks upon a Letter Addressed by M. Mazères, a French Ex-Colonist, to J. C. L. Sismonde de Sismondi), (1816)
- Réflexions Politiques sur quelques Ouvrages et Journaux Français Concernant Haïti (English: Political Remarks upon Certain French Publications and Journals Concerning Haiti), 1817
- Essai sur les Causes de la Révolution et des Guerres Civiles en Haïti (English: An Essay on the Causes of the Revolution and Civil Wars of Haiti), 1819

== Bibliography ==
- Quevilly, Laurent. Le Baron de Vastey, (Books on Demand, 2014, ISBN 978-2-322-03544-1.) Présentation en ligne= http://www.bod.fr/index.php?id=1786&objk_id=1236505.
- Chris Bongie, The colonial system unveiled, édition critique du Système colonial dévoilé traduit en anglais, Liverpool University Press, 2014.
- Schutt-Ainé, Patricia (1994). Haiti: A Basic Reference Book. Miami, Florida: Librairie Au Service de la Culture. p. 90. ISBN 0-9638599-0-0.
- Griggs, Earl Leslie and Thomas Prator. Henry Christophe and Thomas Clarkson: A Correspondence (Berkeley : U of California P, 1952).
- Bongie, Chris. “‘Monotonies of History’: Baron de Vastey and the Mulatto Legend of Derek Walcott's The Haitian Trilogy.” Yale French Studies 107 (2005): 70-107.
- Daut, Marlene. "Un-Silencing the past: Boisrond-Tonnerre, Vastey, and the Re-Writing of the Haitian Revolution." South Atlantic Review 74.1 (2009): 35–64.
- Daut, Marlene. Baron de Vastey and the Origins of Black Atlantic Humanism. Basingstoke, UK: Palgrave Macmillan, 2017.
