= The Colonial System Unveiled =

1814 book by Baron de Vastey

- Pompée-Valentin Vastey - Le système colonial dévoilé
- Author: Baron de Vastey
- Language: French
- Publication date: 1814
- Publication place: Haiti
- English publication date: 2014
- ISBN: 1781383049

The Colonial System Unveiled (French: Le système colonial dévoilé) is a book by Haitian writer and politician, Baron de Vastey, originally published in French in 1814. It is possibly 'the first systemic critique of colonialism ever written' and anticipates several themes and concepts of anticolonial writing, Négritude and Critical race theory, including the idea that colonialism is a system.

== Background ==
The Colonial System Unveiled is one of the earliest examples of writing from Haiti written from a Haitian perspective rather than a colonial one. It was published ten years after the end of the Haitian Revolution, and during the reign of Henri Christophe, who Vastey worked for as secretary. Colonial System is dedicated to the King, linking Vastey's writing to the state.

The known details of Vastey's life have been sparse and contradictory, which has complicated interpretations of the text and in situating it and its author in literary and intellectual tradition. Jean Louis Vastey, known as Baron de Vastey was the son of Jean Vastey, a French plantation owner and Marie Françoise Élisabeth Dumas, a free woman of color. However, there is no mention of Vastey's white father in Colonial System, and the author identifies himself with the African diaspora of Haiti within the text.

== Summary ==
The Colonial System Unveiled is an essay divided into two sections: the first documents the history of colonization and slavery in Saint Domingue, and the latter describes in detail the inhumane acts committed by French colonists and plantation owners, whose names are provided. Vastey advocates for the necessity of violence in retaliation against colonialism.

Colonial System incorporates several styles, genres, techniques and registers; and combines oral and textual influences. Vastey writes from a position of high status, but also expresses the testimonies of the less privileged and even the dead. The essay draws upon indigenous storytelling traditions to convey the collective experience of marginalization faced by enslaved Haitians.

== Critical reception ==
Early readings of Colonial System focused on the descriptive nature of the text, with Vastey's role interpreted as that of a scribe rather than an author. It was treated as a resource with the objective of informing people of the atrocities committed in Haiti, rather than a literary production. Interpretations of the text have been complicated by the ambiguity of the details of Vastey's life; notably, Vastey was sometimes mistakenly assumed to have been formerly enslaved, leading to readings of Colonial System as a slave narrative.

Later criticism of Colonial System has noted the formal aspects of Vastey's writing and its complexity. Twenty-first century critics have analysed the stylistic elements of the text and its use of elements of various genres. Several thematic, theoretical and stylistic aspects of the essay are shared with later postcolonial writing, such as the works of Frantz Fanon and Aimé Césaire.

While Vastey's works were widely popular in the nineteenth century, with three of his books being translated into English shortly after their release, Colonial System has been given less attention by Anglophone audiences. In 2014, two-hundred years after the original publication in French, Liverpool University Press released an English translation of Colonial System translated by Chris Bongie, alongside critical essays and supplementary information on the text and its author.
