= Marie-Louise Coidavid =

Queen consort of Haiti from 1811 to 1820

Marie Louise Coidavid
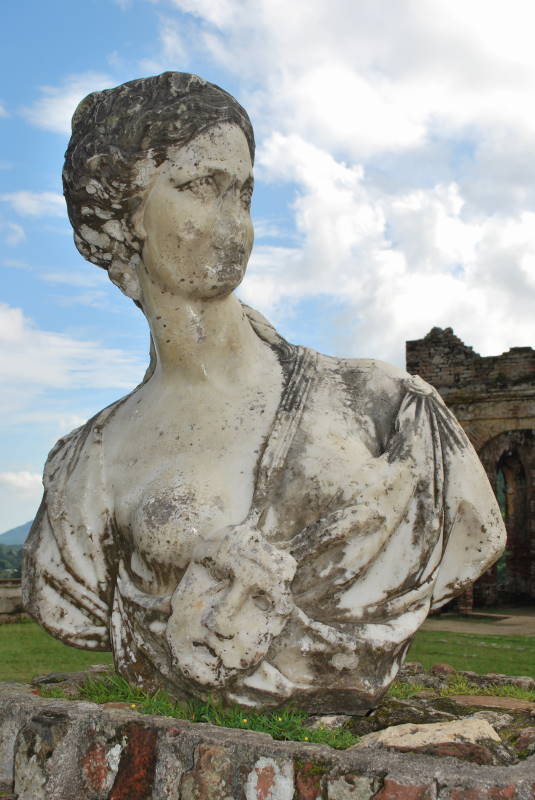
- Female bust located in the Sans-Souci Palace, traditionally identified as representing Marie-Louise

Queen consort of Haiti
- Tenure: 26 March 1811 – 8 October 1820
- Coronation: 2 June 1811
- Born: 8 May 1778; Bredou, Ouanaminthe, Saint-Domingue (now Haiti)
- Died: 14 March 1851 (aged 72); Pisa, Tuscany (now Italy)
- Burial: Convent of the Capuchins, Pisa
- Spouse: Henri I of Haiti
- Issue: François-Ferdinand Christophe; Princess Françoise-Améthyste; Princess Anne-Athénaïre; Jacques-Victor Henry, Prince Royal
- Father: M. Melgrin
- Mother: Célestina Coidavid
- Religion: Roman Catholicism

Queen Marie Louise Coidavid (1778 – 11 March 1851) was the Queen of Haiti from 1811 to 1820 as the spouse of Henri Christophe.

== Early life ==
Marie-Louise was born into a free black family; her father was the owner of Hotel de la Couronne in Cap-Haïtien. Henri Christophe was a slave purchased by her father. Supposedly, he earned enough money in tips from his duties at the hotel that he was able to purchase his freedom before the Haitian Revolution. They married in Cap-Haïtien in 1793, having had a relationship with him from the year prior. They had four children: François Ferdinand (1794–1805), Françoise-Améthyste (d. 1831), Athénaïre (d. 1839) and Jacques-Victor Henry (1804–1820).

At her spouse's new position in 1798, she moved to the Sans-Souci Palace. During the French invasion, she and her children lived underground until 1803.

== Queen ==
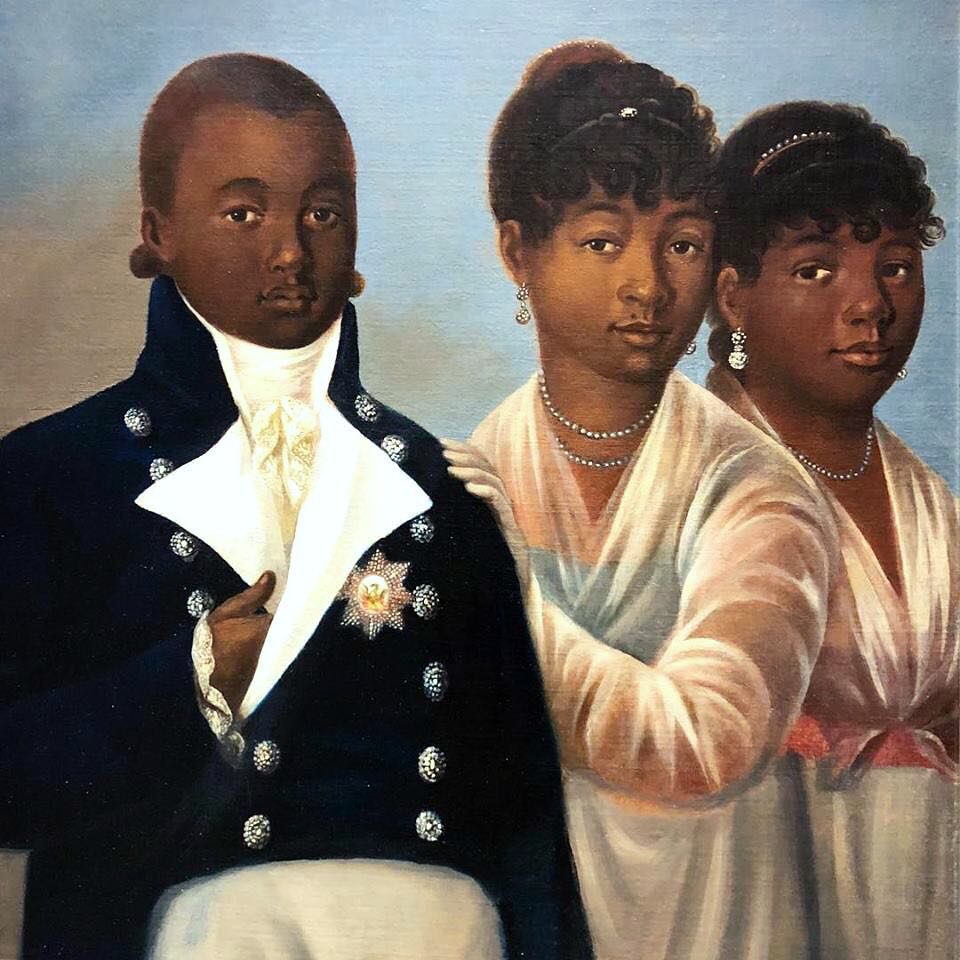
Marie-Louise's children Jacques-Victor Henry, Françoise-Améthyste and Anne Athénaïre (c. 1811 by unknown artist)

In 1811, Marie-Louise was given the title of queen upon the creation of the Kingdom of Haiti. Her new status gave her ceremonial tasks to perform, ladies-in-waiting, a secretary and her own court. She took her position seriously, and stated that the title "given to her by the nation" also gave her responsibilities and duties to perform. She served as the hostess of the ceremonial royal court life performed at the Sans-Souci Palace. She did not involve herself in the affairs of state. She was given the position of Regent should her son succeed her spouse while still being a minor. However, as her son became of age before the death of his father, this was never to materialize.

After the death of the King in 1820, she remained with her daughters Améthyste and Athénaïre at the palace until they were escorted from it by his followers together with his corpse; after their departure, the palace was attacked and plundered. Marie-Louise and her daughters were given the property Lambert outside Cap. She was visited by president Jean Pierre Boyer, who offered her his protection; he denied the spurs of gold she gave him, stating that he was the leader of poor people. They were allowed to settle in Port-au-Prince. Marie-Louise was described as calm and resigned, but her daughters, especially Athénaïre, were described as vengeful.

== Exile ==
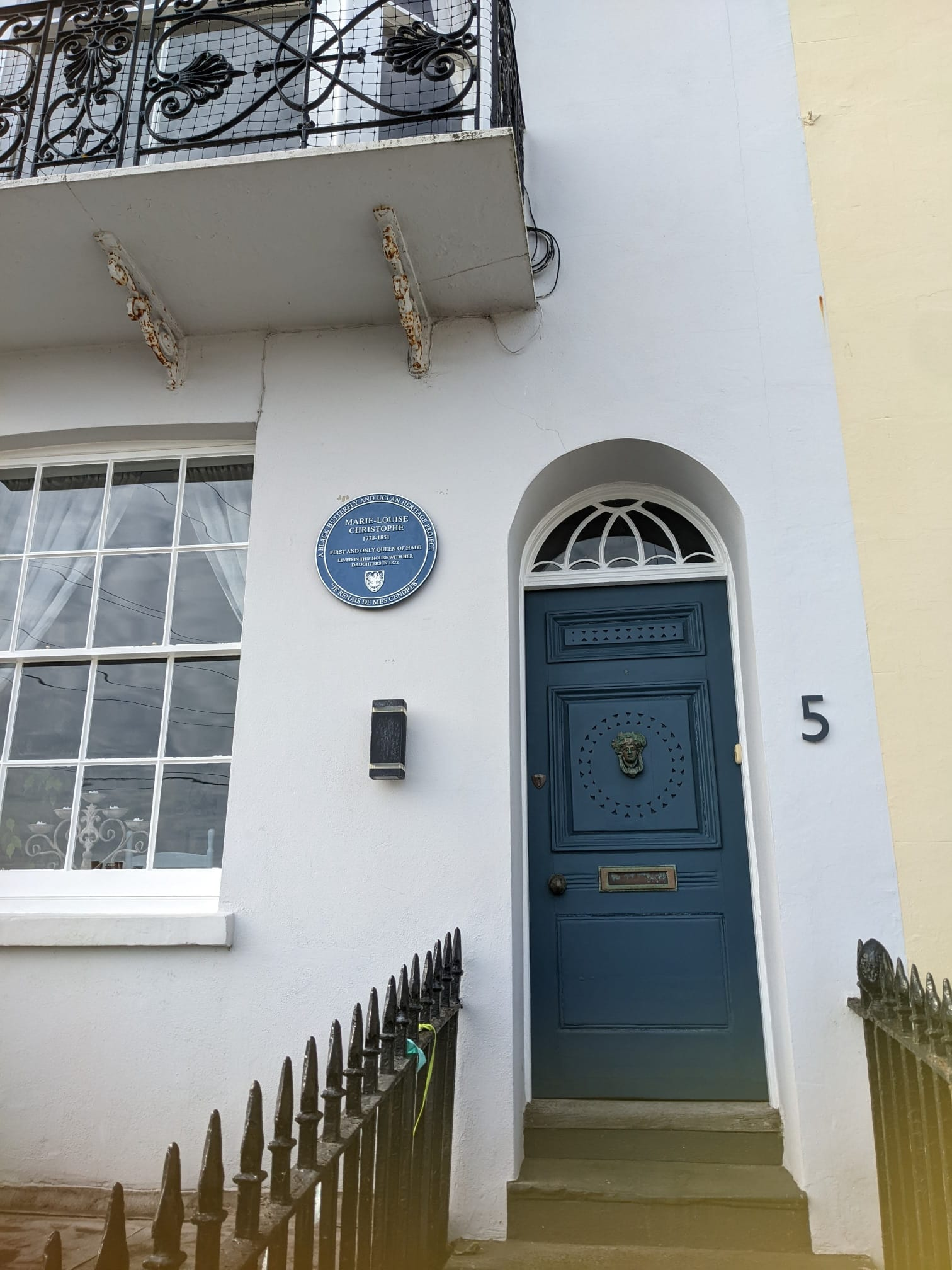
The blue plaque honouring the Queen in situ on 5 Exmouth Place, Hastings

The Queen was in exile for 30 years. In August 1821, Marie-Louise left Haiti with her daughters under the protection of the Royal Navy and travelled to London. There were rumours that she was searching for the money, three million, deposited by her spouse in Europe. Whatever the case, she did live the rest of her life without economic difficulties.

In England, they lived in Blackheath, where they were welcomed by prominent abolitionists, and then moved to 49 Weymouth Street, London, where she lived between 1821 and 1824. In October 1822, she took up residence in Hastings, East Sussex, at what is now 5 Exmouth Place with her daughters, who, like many wealthy and aristocratic Londoners, wanted to escape the smog and bustle of central London. In 2022, blue plaques honouring the Queen's time in England were erected and celebrated.

The English climate and pollution during the Industrial Revolution was detrimental to Améthyste's health, and eventually they decided to leave.

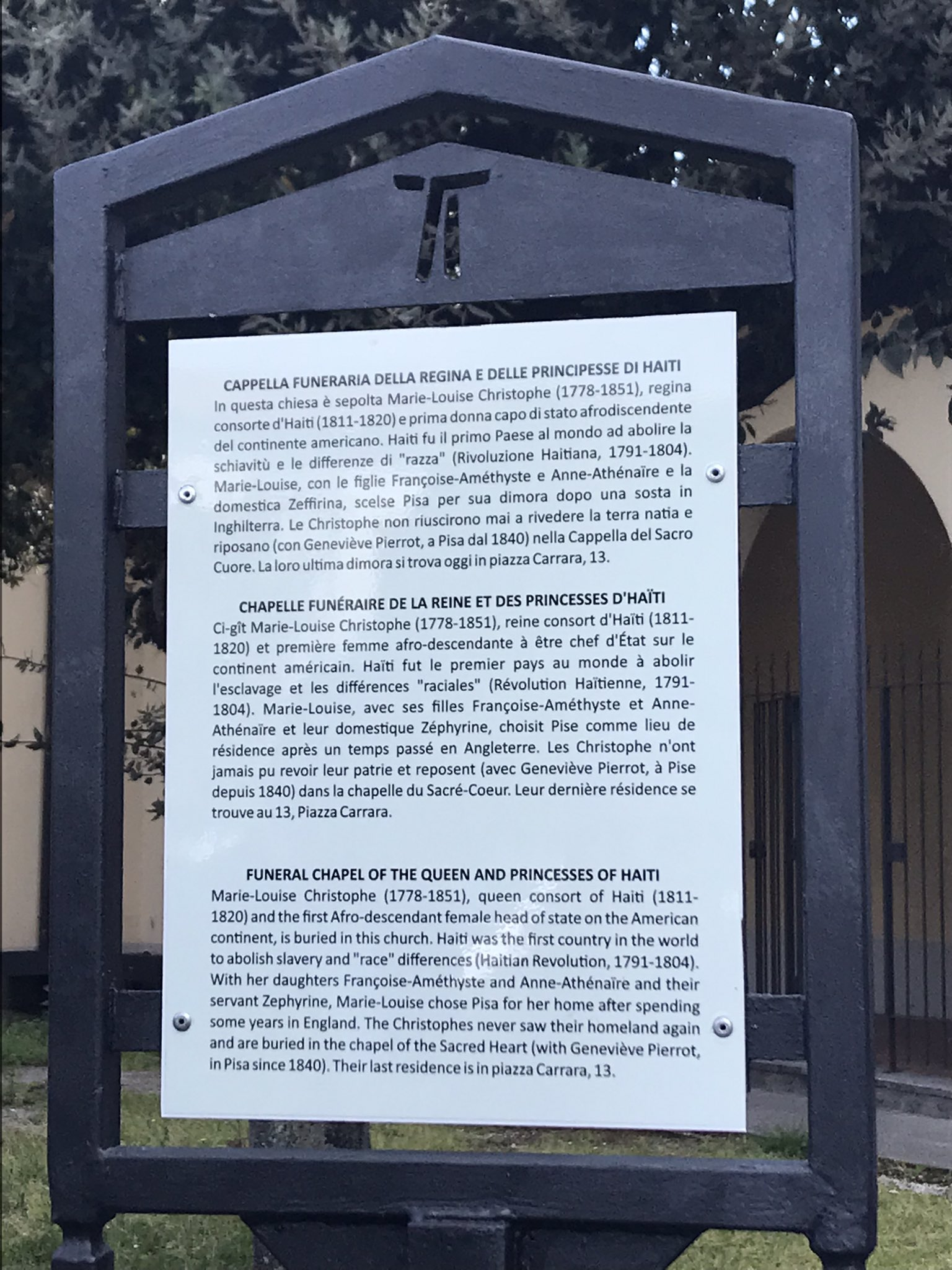

In 1824, Marie-Louise and her daughters moved in Pisa in the Grand Duchy of Tuscany (now Italy), where they lived for the rest of their lives, Améthyste dying shortly after their arrival and Athénaïre in 1839. They lived discreetly for the most part, but were occasionally bothered by fortune hunters and throne claimers who wanted their fortune.

Shortly before her death, Marie-Louise wrote to Haiti for permission to return. She never did, however, before she died in Italy on 11 March 1851. She is buried in the church of San Donnino. A historical marker was installed in front of the church on 23 April 2023, to commemorate the Queen, her daughters and her sister.

== See also ==
- Marie-Claire Heureuse Félicité
- Adélina Lévêque
