= François-Ferdinand Christophe =

Haitian royal (1794–1805)

- Born: 1794; Cap-Français, Saint-Domingue
- Died: 7 October 1805 (aged 10–11); France
Names
- François-Ferdinand Henri Christophe
- Father: Henri I of Haiti
- Mother: Marie-Louise Coidavid
- Religion: Roman Catholic

François-Ferdinand Henri Christophe (1794 – October 7, 1805) was the eldest son and first child of Field General Henri Christophe, future King of Haiti, and his wife, Marie-Louise Coidavid. Because he was both born and died before his father's ascension as King, in 1811, he was never Prince Royal of Haiti, nor was he ever heir apparent to the throne.

== Early life ==
He was born in 1794 in Cap-Français (Le Cap), Saint-Domingue, now known as Cap-Haïtien, Haiti, as the first child and eldest son of Henri Christophe, a Field General and former slave, and Marie-Louise Coidavid, the daughter of a black hotel owner. Although not yet royalty, Christophe had big plans for his son and wanted him to follow in his footsteps. In a conversation with a friend, Christophe once proudly said of his infant son: "Never have I seen a finer baby than my little Francois-Ferdinand. He is strong and strapping, like me. He recognized me. He caught hold of my finger and smiled. He is the image of me!"

== Education and death ==
When he was the appropriate age, Christophe started making plans for François-Ferdinand's education. He wanted his son to be a military man, like he was. As a young boy, François-Ferdinand was sent by his father to France, more specifically to Paris, where Christophe hoped that his son would receive a sturdy, military education. Instead, the Parisians, freshly defeated by the Haitian armies led by Christophe, in numerous battles, took François-Ferdinand out of school and made him a hostage. Christophe, learning of this situation, demanded explanations. The French promised that his son would receive a liberal education; instead, they placed François-Ferdinand in an orphans' asylum in Paris. On October 7, 1805, the 11-year-old boy died at the Orphans' Hospital of Paris. Both the circumstances of his death and his burial place are unknown. Even after Christophe became King Henri I of Haiti, he remained heartbroken because of his son's death. His official historian, forced to make constant references to the boy's lonely death in France, referred to François-Ferdinand with the title of prince, though he was never entitled to use it during his lifetime.
