= Richard Evans (portrait painter) =

English painter (1784–1871)

Richard Evans (1784 – November 1871) was an English painter and copyist who specialised in portrait painting. He was a pupil of Sir Thomas Lawrence, later serving as his assistant.

== Early life ==
Evans was born in Shrewsbury. When young he was a close friend of the Birmingham-born artist David Cox, who would lend ink landscape drawings to Evans, who was short of money, so that he could make copies to sell. When Cox moved to London in 1804, Evans and another aspiring artist friend, Charles Barber, followed him there. They both took lodgings near Cox, and all three would go out sketching together.

== Sir Thomas Lawrence ==
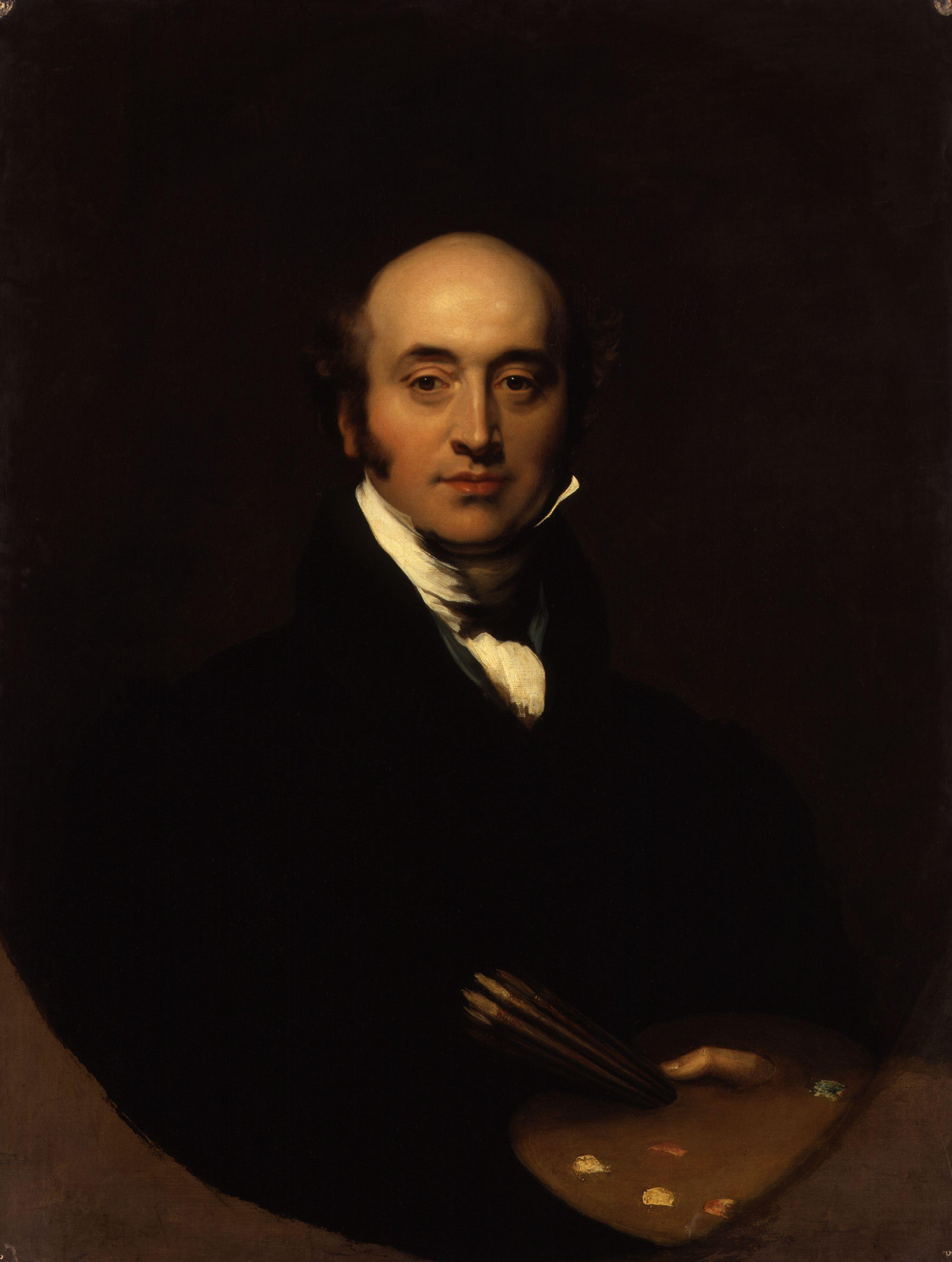
Copy by Evans of a self-portrait by Thomas Lawrence, now in the National Portrait Gallery

For some years Evans was a pupil and assistant of Sir Thomas Lawrence, for whom he painted drapery and backgrounds and made replicas of his paintings. When Lawrence died in 1830, he left a large number of unfinished paintings, and Evans completed or copied several portraits of George IV and completed a portrait of the Bishop of Durham for the painter's executors.

Thomas Campbell, who was at once stage considering a biography of Lawrence said in a letter that no-one knew more about Lawrence than Evans, due to his exceptional memory, and his having lived in his master's house for six years. Evans promised to help Campbell with his book when time allowed, but when Campbell asked for assistance again, after a long delay, he found out that Evans had already told his stock of anecdotes to his friend Watts, editor of the "Annual Obituary" to use in his publication. Campbell shelved his plan for lack of fresh material.

== France and Haiti ==
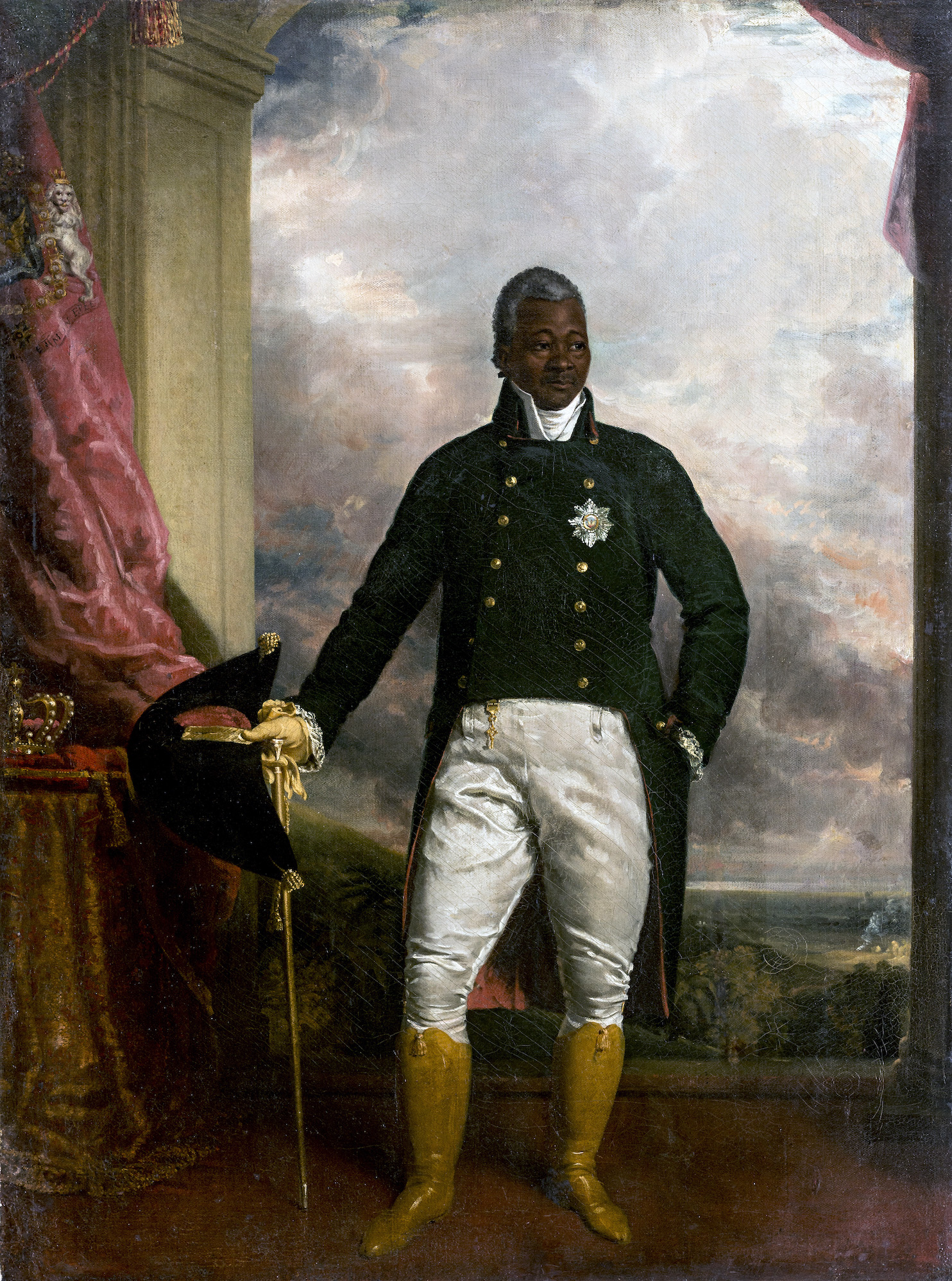
Henri Christophe, 1816

In 1814 Evans visited The Louvre in Paris, and was one of the first Englishmen to copy the pictures there. He exhibited at the Royal Academy for the first time in 1816, showing a portrait of the aeronaut James Sadler.

In the same year he went to Haiti where he became head of the new school of drawing and painting set up by King Henri Christophe at his palace of Sans-Souci. He arrived on Haiti on 21 September, in the company of Prince Saunders, and three other men Saunders had engaged in England: an agriculturalist and two schoolmasters. He painted portraits of the Haitian royal family, his first portrait of the king being sent as a gift to William Wilberforce. In 1818 Evans exhibited pictures catalogued as His Majesty Henry Christophe, King of Hayti and Prince Victor Henry, Prince Royal of Hayti at the Royal Academy.

== Italy ==
He spent some time in Italy, copying the old masters and painting portraits. In 1821 he was in Rome, making copies of Raphael's arabesque decorations in the Vatican loggia for John Nash's gallery in Regent Street and the following year he returned there, this time in the company of his friend William Etty, another a former pupil of Thomas Lawrence. Travelling overland via Paris they arrived in Rome on 10 August. After a fortnight, Etty moved on to Naples, leaving Evans in Rome. He returned a month later. Etty wrote in a letter that "an arrangement has been made that would preclude my staying with him... but I must ever feel much obliged to him. He has gone about with me, and shown me things I should not otherwise have seen". They travelled separately for a while, Evans basing himself in Rome, but also visiting Milan, while Etty spent seven months in Venice. In Rome Evans became a member of an academy set up by British artists, with Lawrence's backing, and served on the management committee of the organisation, formally known as the 'British Academy of Arts in Rome'. Evans and Etty were reunited in Florence in the summer of 1823 and after spending two months in Venice finally left for England in October.

While In Rome Evans experimented with fresco-painting, and on leaving the city gave one of his attempts – depicting Ganymede feeding the Eagle – to the servant who cleaned his studio. Years afterwards he found it hanging in the South Kensington Museum, displayed as a genuine antique fresco from a tomb in the neighbourhood of Rome.

== Exhibitions ==
Evans continued to be a frequent exhibitor at the Royal Academy until 1845, mostly of portraits. In May 1849 the rejection of one of his pictures by the Academy led to an altercation, following which Evans appeared in court charged with assault, having struck the Academy's secretary, John Prescott Knight, with his stick.

He also showed six subject pictures at the British Institution between 1831 and 1856.

== Later life ==
He continued to paint until the end of his life, and executed a large picture of The Death of Æsculapius when over 85 years of age. He died at Southampton, where he had lived for more than 25 years, in November 1871, aged 87. He presented some of the casts of antique statuary, which he had collected in Rome to the Hartley Institute, Southampton.

== Collections ==
The collection of the National Portrait Gallery includes his portraits of Harriet Martineau and, George Bradshaw (1841) and his copies of Thomas Lawrence's portraits of George Canning (c.1825) and Thomas Taylor, and of Lawrence's own self-portrait.

== Gallery ==
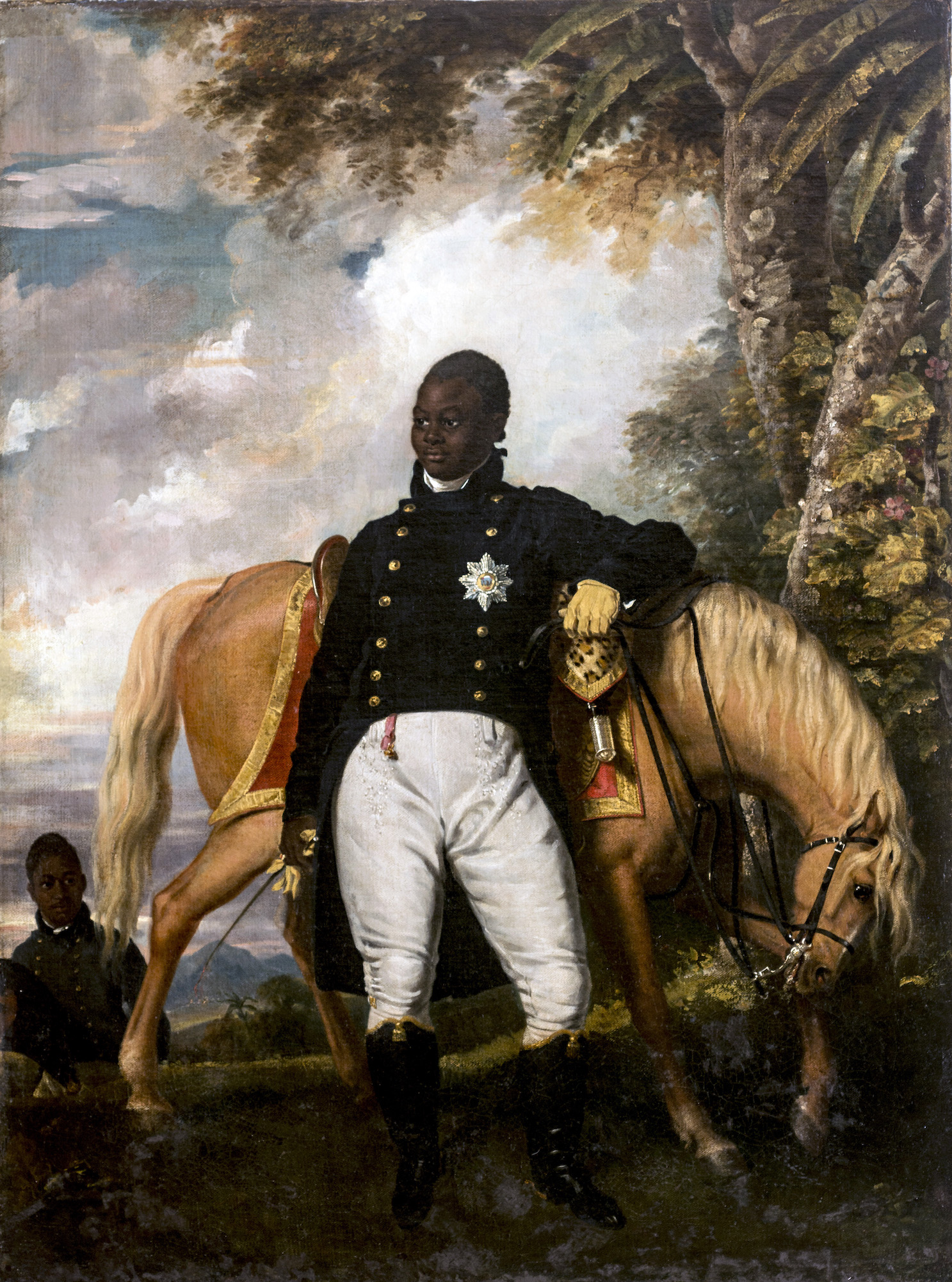
Jacques-Victor Henry, 1816

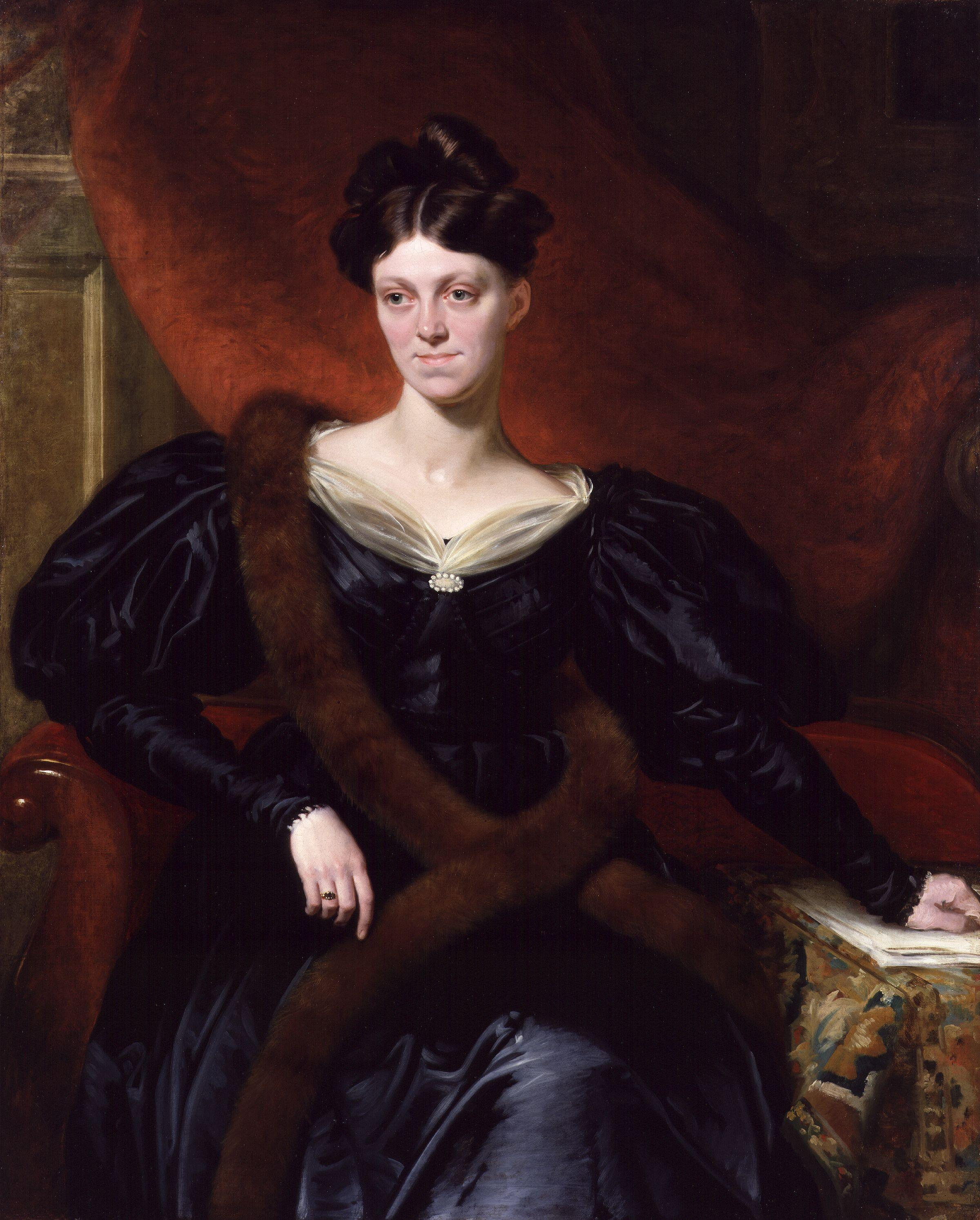
Harriet Martineau, 1834

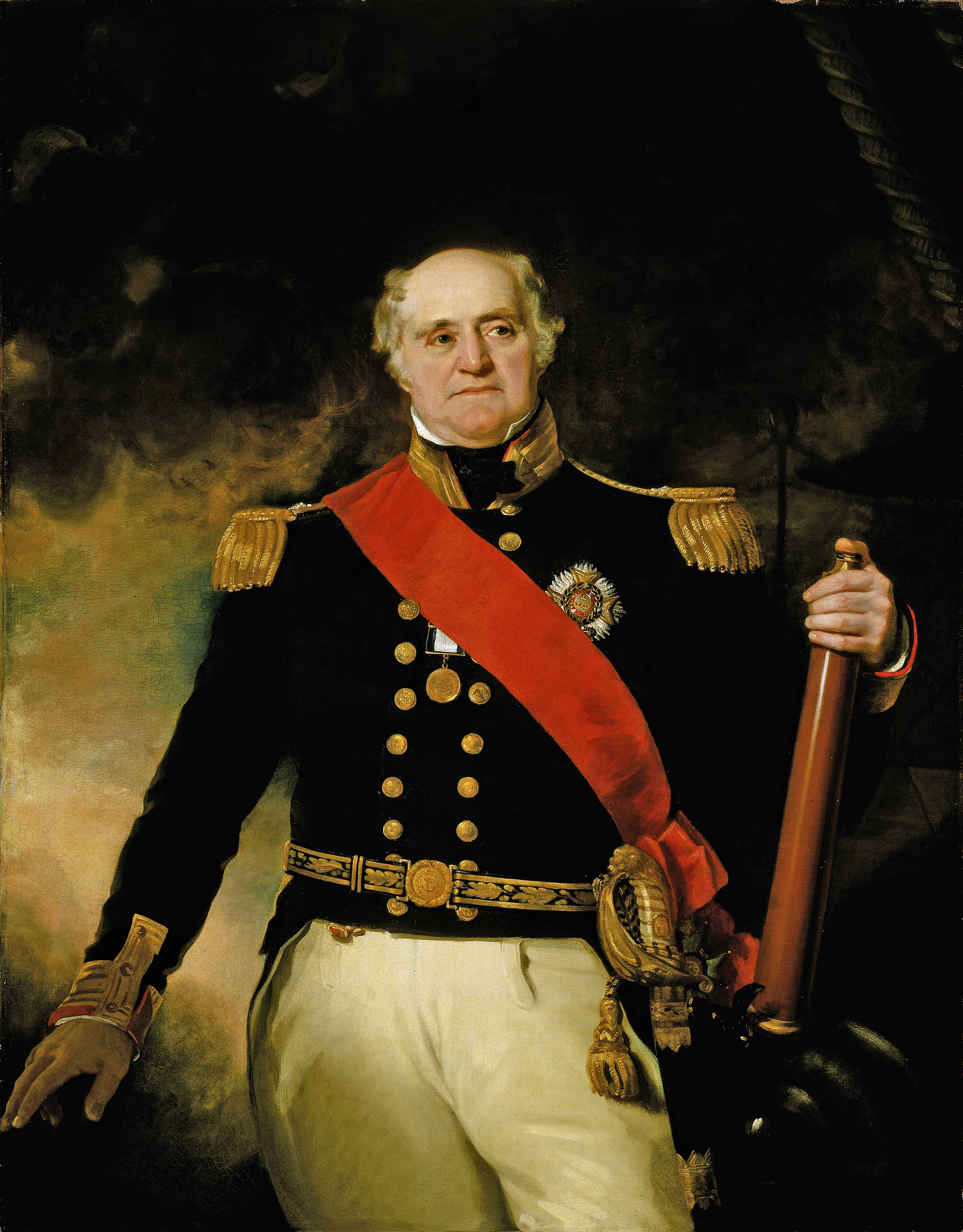
Portrait of Sir Thomas Hardy, 1834

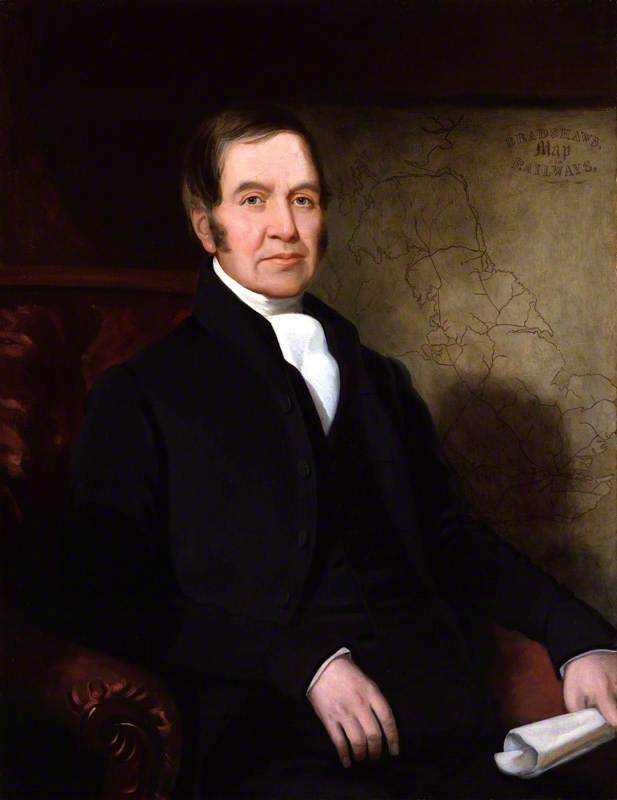
Portrait of George Bradshaw, 1841

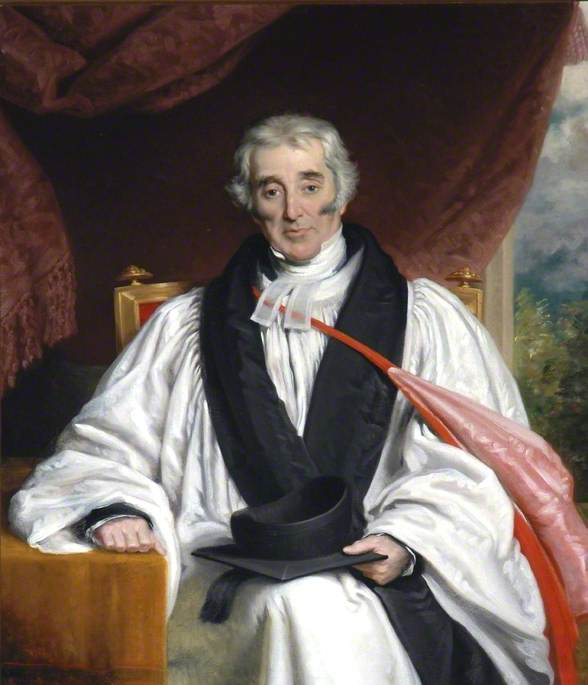
Gerald Valerian Wellesley, unknown date

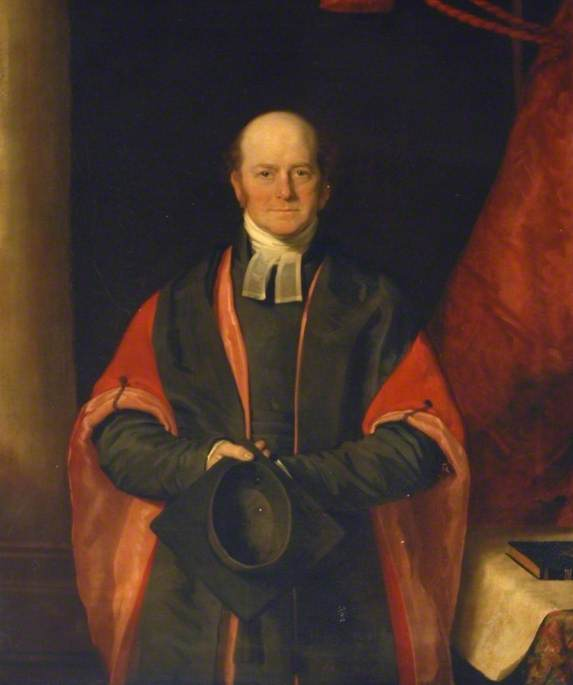
William Stephen Gilly, 1850

== Notes ==
This article incorporates text from a publication now in the public domain: "Evans, Richard". Dictionary of National Biography. London: Smith, Elder & Co. 1885–1900.

== Sources ==
- Gilchrist, Alexander (1855). Life of William Etty, R.A. Vol. 1. London: David Bogue.
- Layard, George Somes, ed. (1906). Sir Thomas Lawrence's Letter-bag. London: George Allen.
- This article incorporates text from a publication now in the public domain: "Evans, Richard". Dictionary of National Biography. London: Smith, Elder & Co. 1885–1900.
