= Johann Gottfried Eiffe =

German painter

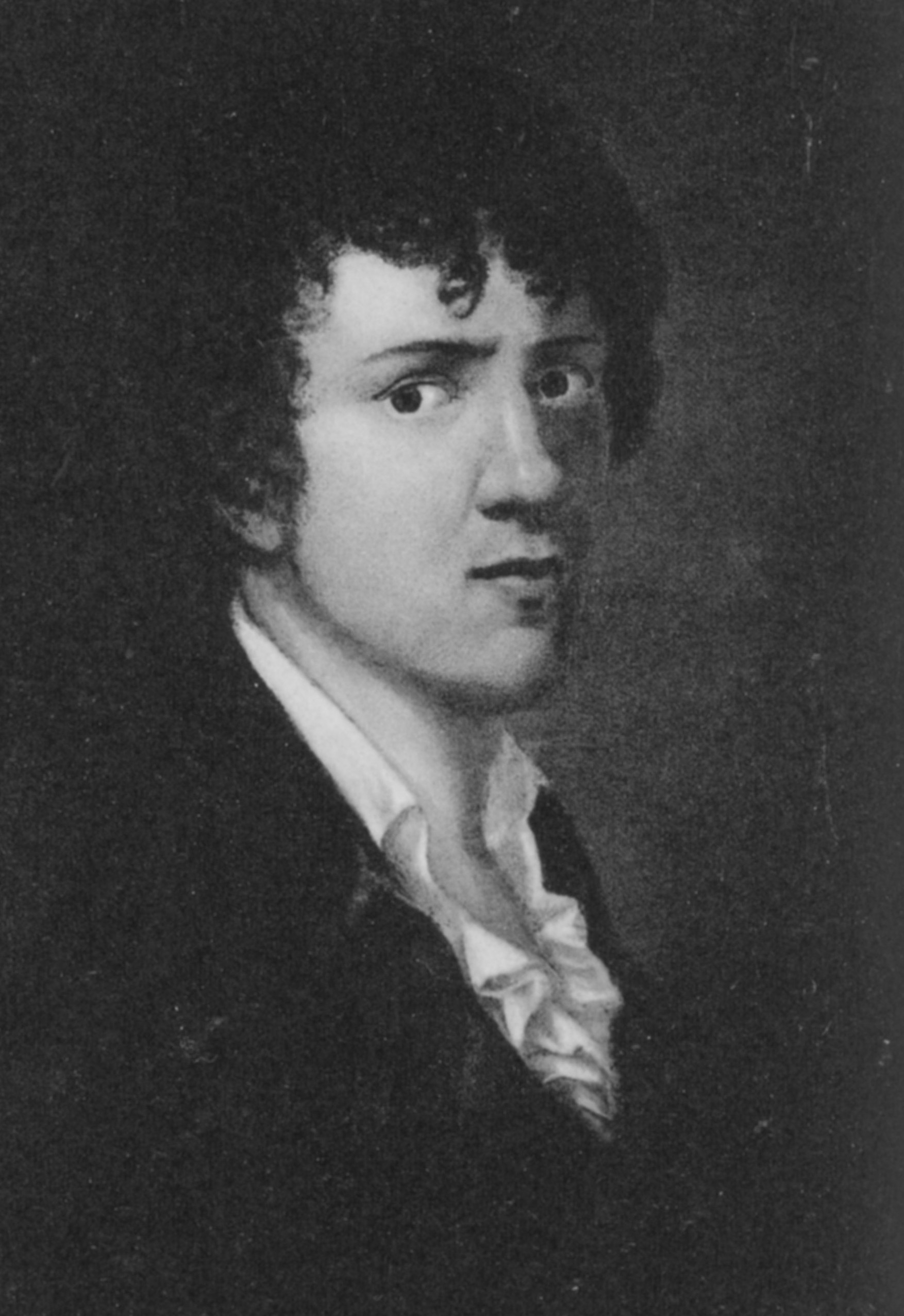
Portrait

Johann Gottfried Eiffe (13 August 1773 or 1779, Hamburg - 13 August 1818, La Victoire, Haiti) was a German painter.

== Life and work ==
Little is known about his family or youth. In 1798, he took drawing lessons from Gerdt Hardorff, then accompanied his friend, Philipp Otto Runge, to Copenhagen, where he continued his studies with Jens Juel. He and Runge were both dissatisfied with the training at the official academies, so they and several other fellow students established their own "Privat-Akademie", to supplement the standard curriculum.

In 1801, he followed his friend to Dresden. Eiffe made little progress there, depending largely on Runge's contacts to promote his works. This led to a rift between them, with Runge accusing Eiffe of not having any true artistic ambition. Runge married and returned to Hamburg in 1804. With his career at a standstill, and no orders for paintings, Eiffe also went back, in 1807. There, he gave painting and drawing lessons and received a few orders, but his financial situation remained precarious. After Runge's death in 1810, he made copies of one of his friend's self-portraits and sold them to acquaintances.

In 1816, when Henri Christophe, who styled himself King Henry I, offered to pay European painters large sums to work at his court, Eiffe went there. He created numerous portraits and decorated some rooms at the royal palace of Sans-Souci. After it became known that he intended to take the money and return to Germany, he was dismissed and subjected to persecution. He died there in 1818, in a state of extreme poverty.

== Sources ==
- Susanne Geese: "Eiffe, Johann Gottfried". In: Franklin Kopitzsch, Dirk Brietzke (Eds.): Hamburgische Biografie, Vol.3. Wallstein, Göttingen 2006, ISBN 3-8353-0081-4, pp. 108–109
- Kurze Lebensschilderung, in: Philipp Otto Runge, Johann Daniel Runge (Ed.): Hinterlassene Schriften. Friedrich Perthes, Hamburg 1840–41, Vols.1–2, pg.451, (Online)
