= Kingdom of Haiti =

State in northwestern Hispaniola from 1811 to 1820

Kingdom of Haiti Royaume d'Haïti (French) Wayòm an Ayiti (Haitian Creole)
- 1811–1820
- Flag Coat of arms
- Motto: Ex cineribus nascitur (Latin) "Reborn from the ashes"
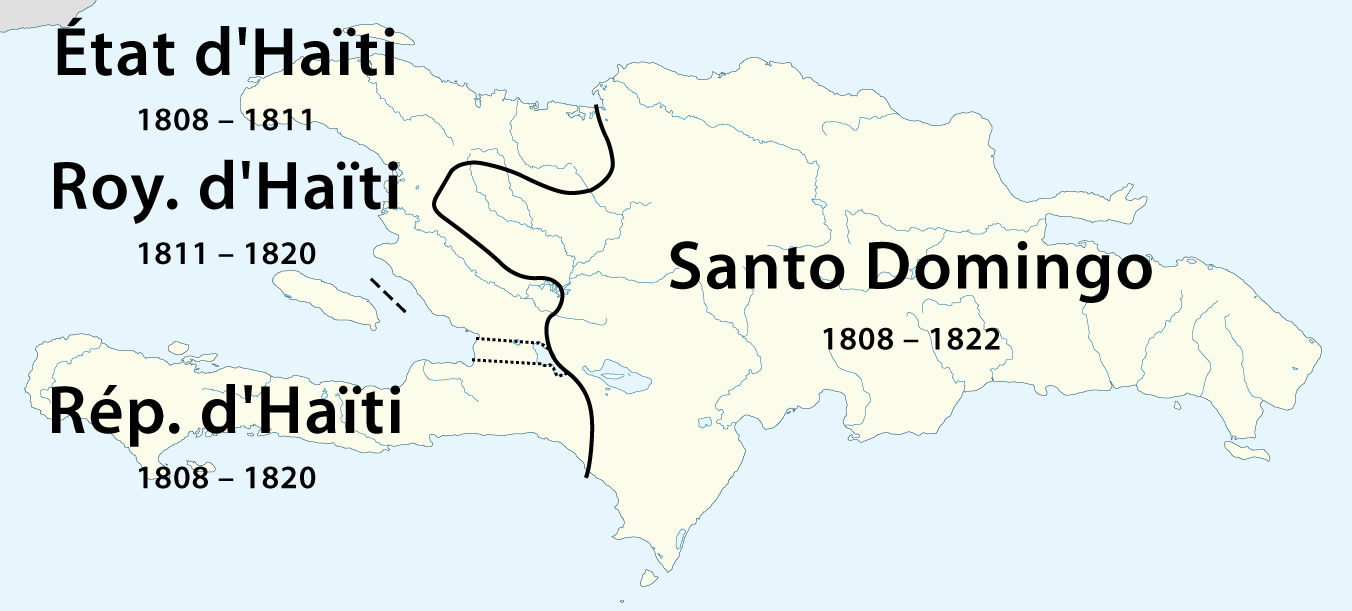
- The Kingdom of Haiti in the northwest of Hispaniola
- Capital: Cap-Henri
- Common languages: French, Haitian Creole
- Religion: Roman Catholicism
- Government: Monarchy
- King
  - 1811–1820: Henry I
  - 1820: Henry II (not proclaimed)
- Legislature: Parliament
  - Upper Chamber: Senate
  - Lower Chamber: Chamber of Deputies
- History
  - Proclamation of Henri Christophe as King Henry I: 28 March 1811
  - Death of King Henry I: 8 October 1820
- Currency: Haitian livre, Haitian gourde (as of 1813)
Preceded by	Succeeded by
State of Haiti	Republic of Haiti (1820–1849)

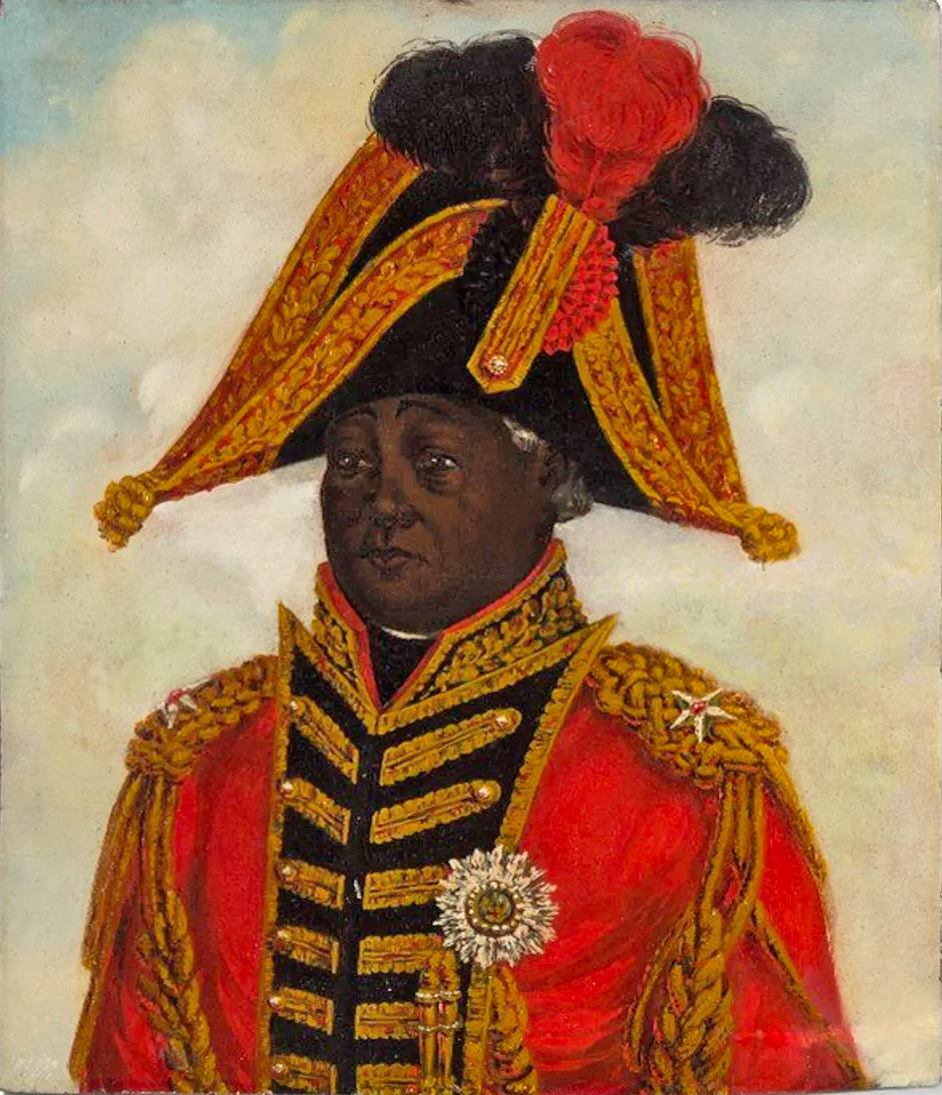
King Henri I of the Kingdom of Haiti

The Kingdom of Haiti, or Kingdom of Hayti (French: Royaume d'Haïti; Haitian Creole: Wayòm an Ayiti), was the state established by Henri Christophe on 28 March 1811 when he proclaimed himself King Henri I after having previously ruled as president of the State of Haiti, in the northern part of the country. This was Haiti's second attempt at monarchical rule, as Jean-Jacques Dessalines had previously ruled over the First Empire of Haiti as Emperor Jacques I from 1804 until his assassination in 1806.

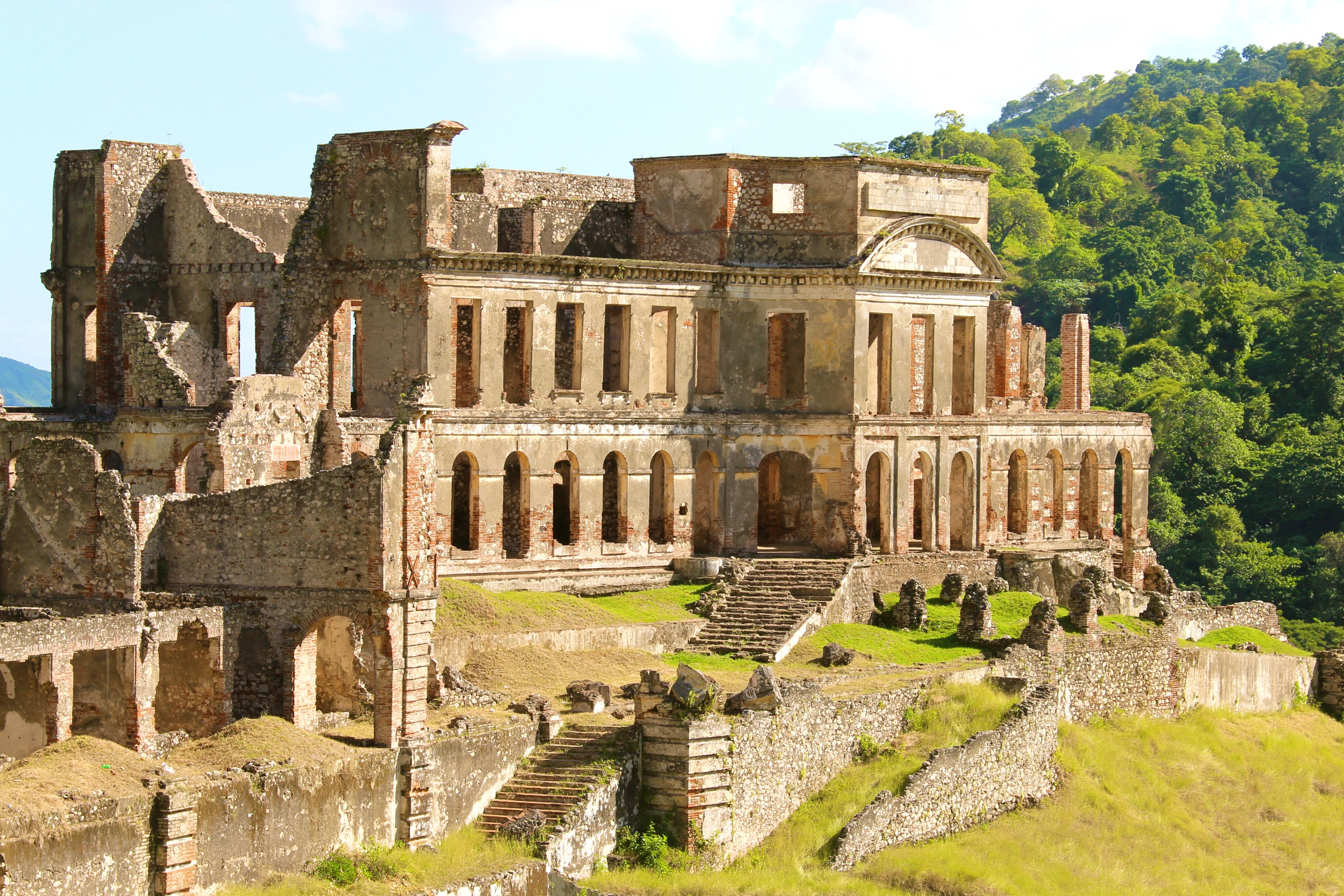
San-Souci Palace

During his reign, Henri built six castles, eight palaces (including the Sans-Souci Palace), the Royal Chapel of Milot, and the Citadelle Laferrière, built to protect the Kingdom from possible French invasions. He created a noble class and appointed four princes, eight dukes, 22 counts, 37 barons, and 14 chevaliers.

After suffering a stroke and with support for his rule waning, Henri I committed suicide on 8 October 1820. He was buried at the Citadelle Henry. His 16-year-old son and heir, Jacques-Victor Henri, Prince Royal of Haiti, was murdered 10 days later at the Sans-Souci Palace by rebels.

Following the assassination of Emperor Jacques I, the country was split. Parallel with the government of Christophe in the north, Alexandre Pétion, a free person of color, ruled over the south of the country as President of the Republic of Haiti until his death in 1818. He was succeeded by Jean-Pierre Boyer, who reunited the two parts of the nation after the deaths of Henri I and his son in 1820.

== History ==
=== Background ===
From 1791 to 1804, the Haitian Revolution against the French colonists raged. After the failure of the French expedition of 1803, General Jean-Jacques Dessalines proclaimed Haiti's independence.

On 8 October 1804, Dessalines was crowned emperor in Cap-Haïtien under the name of Jacques I.

Following independence, political divisions emerged within Haiti's leadership. On 17 October 1806, Emperor Jean-Jacques Dessalines was assassinated at Pont-Rouge, near Port-au-Prince, in a conspiracy involving several senior officers, including forces aligned with General Alexandre Pétion.

After Dessalines's death, the empire was abolished and members of the imperial family went into exile. Pétion established a republic in southern Haiti and became its president. Meanwhile, General Henri Christophe assumed control of the northern region, where he founded the State of Haiti, a separate political entity.

Christophe initially ruled as president and later as president for life. Seeking to strengthen the legitimacy of his government, he reorganized the state along monarchical lines after consolidating military control of the northern territory in conflicts with the southern republic led by Pétion. On 28 March 1811, Christophe proclaimed the establishment of the Kingdom of Haiti and assumed the throne as Henri I. His coronation took place on 2 June 1811 and was officiated by Grand Archbishop Jean-Baptiste-Joseph Brelle.

Political developments in the south also influenced the constitutional transformation of the northern state. In 1810, General André Rigaud returned from France and attempted to challenge Pétion's authority. Contemporary observers in Christophe's government cited instability within the southern republic as evidence in favour of monarchical governance.

=== Conflict with the Republic of the South ===
Following the division of Haiti in 1807, political tensions developed between the northern state governed by Henri Christophe and the southern republic led by Alexandre Pétion. The split produced a prolonged conflict between the two regimes, sometimes described as a civil war, although neither side succeeded in permanently conquering the other's territory.

After proclaiming the Kingdom of Haiti in 1811, Christophe presented his monarchy as a stabilizing alternative to republican government in the south. Pétion, for his part, portrayed the northern monarchy as incompatible with the principles of the Haitian Revolution and representative government.

Military engagements between the northern and southern governments continued intermittently from 1807 until Pétion's death in 1818, after which his successor, Jean-Pierre Boyer, maintained the southern republic's independence until the unification of Haiti in 1820 following Christophe's death.

Pétion amended the southern constitution in 1816, becoming president for life with the authority to appoint his successor, a development cited by contemporaries as evidence of increasing executive power within the republic.

=== Revolution of the North ===
==== Reasons for the revolt ====
In 1818, following the death of Alexandre Pétion, leadership of the southern republic passed to Jean-Pierre Boyer, Pétion's designated successor.

During the final years of the northern kingdom, internal tensions increased as economic difficulties and dissatisfaction with the system of forced agricultural labour contributed to unrest among both the population and elements of the military.

By 1820, opposition to Christophe's rule had grown significantly in the northern provinces. A revolt broke out among troops in Cap-Haïtien and spread to other parts of the kingdom, undermining royal authority.

Facing increasing resistance and declining support, Christophe suffered a stroke in August 1820 that left him partially paralysed. As the rebellion advanced, he promptly shot himself on 8 October 1820 at the Citadelle Laferrière, given his likely deposition and execution. After his death, his son, Crown Prince Jacques-Victor Henry, was proclaimed king by his followers under the name of Henri II. However, the insurgents hanged the new king on 18 October 1820. Queen Marie-Louise Coidavid and her daughters went into exile in Italy.

Following Christophe's death, Boyer moved to unify the country under the southern republic, bringing an end to the Kingdom of Haiti and restoring political unity to the state later that year.

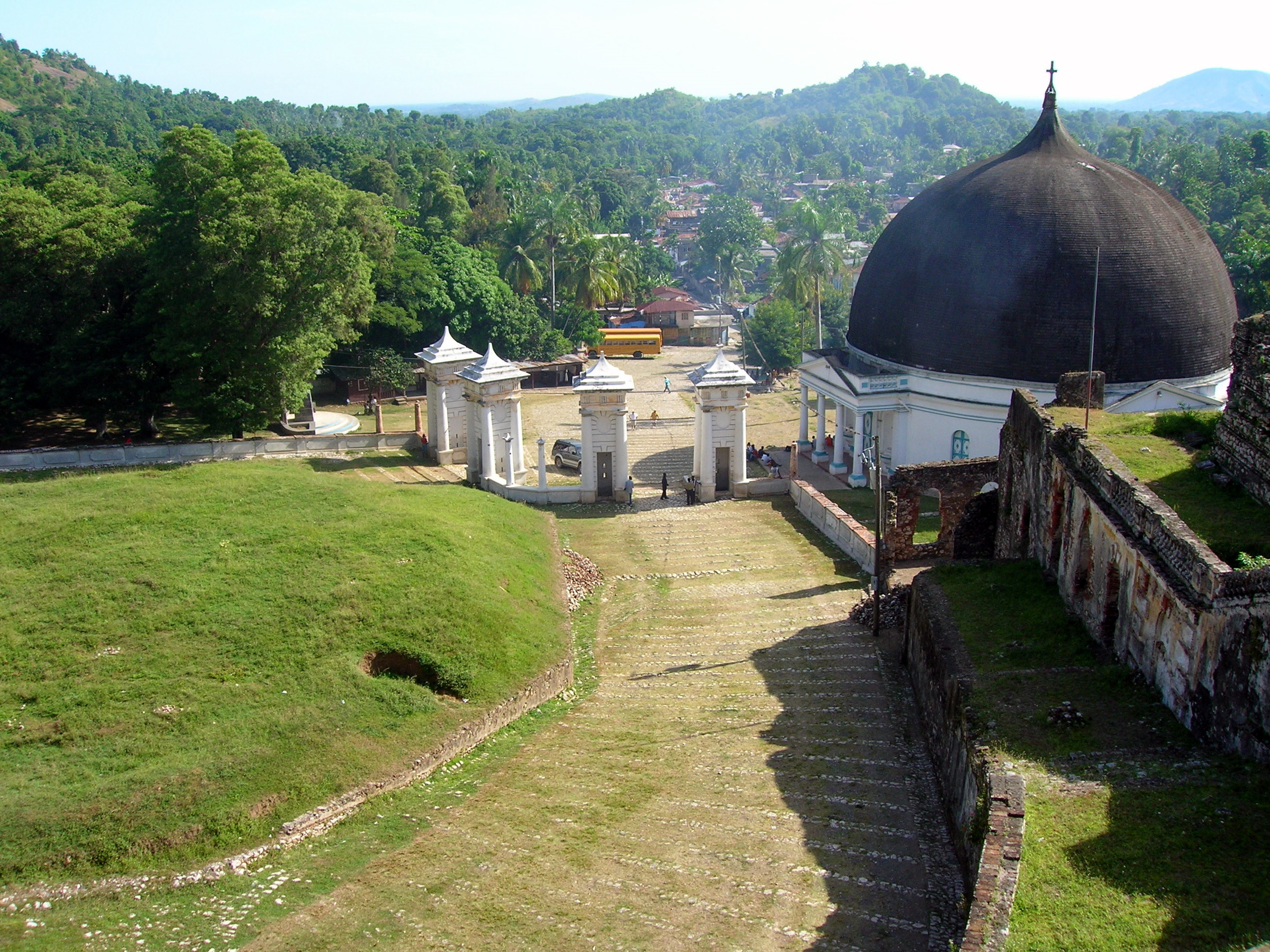
Sans-Souci Chapel

=== Posterity ===
After the episode of the reign of Henri Christophe, no other true monarchy arose in Haiti until the Second Empire of Faustin Soulouque (Faustin I) in 1849–1859. There have been attempts to re-establish the monarchy, however. One such case was that of Pierre Nord Alexis, grandson of the former King Henri, who took power in 1902. An authoritarian, he declared himself president for life and even ended up proposing a new constitutional monarchy with himself as king. But this project provoked a last revolt that turned into a new revolution and forced Nord Alexis to go into exile in 1908. He died two years later, in 1910, at the age of 89.

== Government ==
=== Difficult beginnings ===
Although political and military tensions with the southern republic continued, the frontier between the two states remained largely stable throughout Christophe's reign.

During the early years of the kingdom, Christophe faced internal opposition, including a revolt in 1812 that challenged aspects of his rule.

Christophe sought to consolidate authority through administrative and legal reforms intended to strengthen the state and promote economic productivity. His government introduced a constitutional framework and legal code, while also expanding public works and establishing schools intended to develop an educated administrative elite.

Christophe's administration emphasized centralized authority, a structured nobility, and the maintenance of agricultural production through a regulated labour system. These policies contributed to a period of relative political stability in northern Haiti, although tensions persisted both internally and in relations with the southern republic.

=== Organization of power ===
Under the constitutional framework established in 1811, executive authority in the Kingdom of Haiti was concentrated in the person of the king, who exercised primary control over legislation, administration, and the military.

The monarch was assisted by a royal government composed of ministers responsible for major areas of state administration. Among the most senior officials was the chancellor, who served as a principal advisor to the king and participated in the management of governmental affairs.

Christophe also created a system of hereditary titles intended to structure the political elite of the kingdom. Members of this nobility held ranks such as duke, count, and baron, reflecting the monarch's effort to establish a hierarchical social order modelled in part on European precedents while maintaining authority within the Haitian state.

Joseph Rouanez, who was granted the title Duke of Morin, served as an early chancellor of the kingdom. After his death in 1812, he was succeeded by Julien Prévost, who remained in office until the collapse of the monarchy in 1820.

Although ministers exercised administrative responsibilities, ultimate political authority remained vested in the monarch under the constitutional structure of the kingdom.

=== Nobility system ===
With an edict dated 5 April 1811, King Henry proclaimed a noble class whose titles, shields, and mottos were intended to be transmitted hereditarily. This nobility system was largely inspired by British institutions, but it also showed some French influence; for instance, like Napoleon's nobility, it did not include marquis or viscount. The conferred titles mostly corresponded to majorates, which in this case were vast territories.

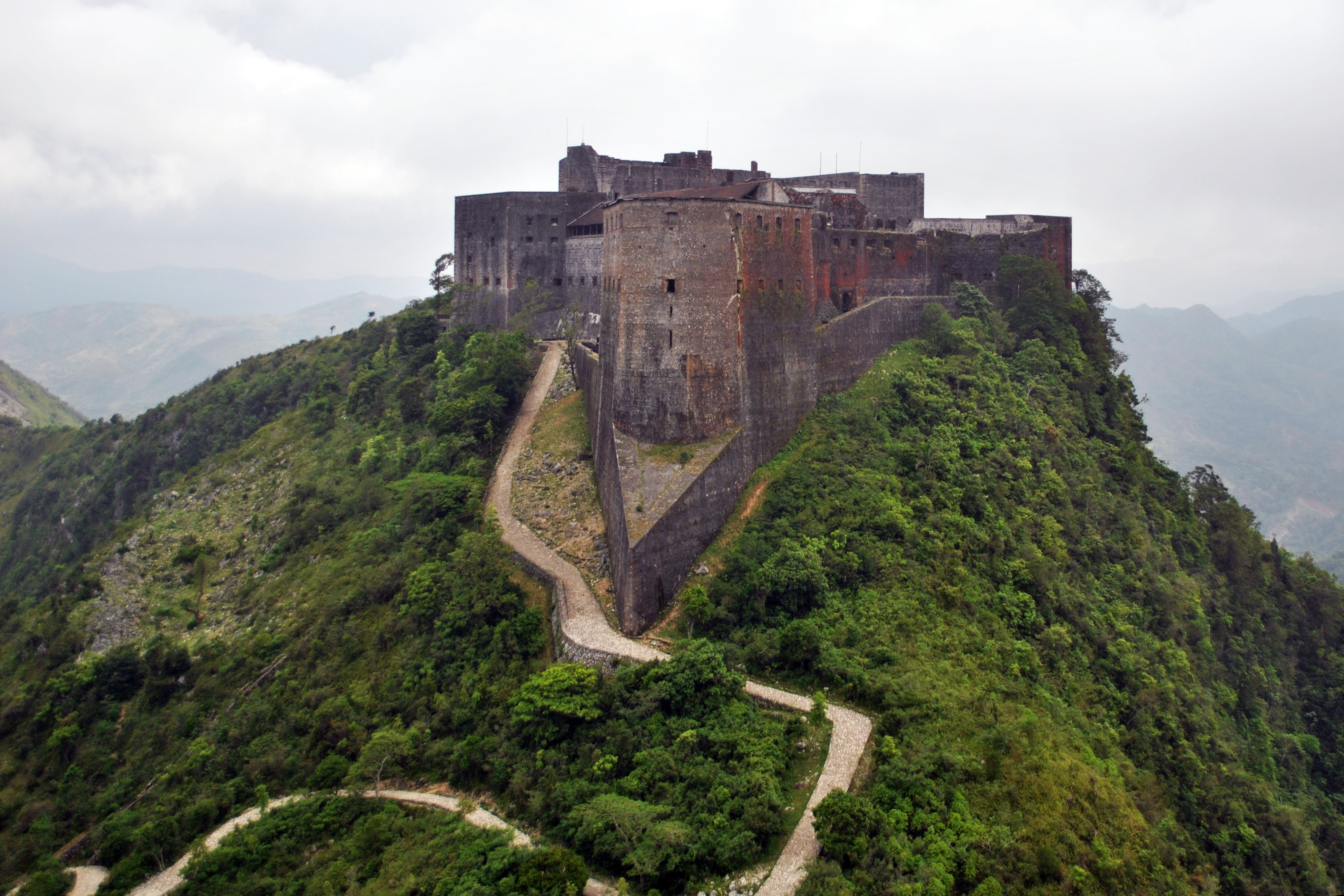
Citadelle Laferrière

=== Work ===
Christophe maintained and expanded a system of agricultural labour commonly described as caporalisme agraire, a structure derived in part from earlier plantation administration that sought to preserve export production following independence. Under this system, agricultural workers were organized under military-style supervision to maintain cultivation of major export crops such as sugar and coffee.

Revenue generated through agricultural production contributed to state-building projects in northern Haiti, including the construction of royal residences, fortifications, schools, and administrative institutions.

Among the most prominent architectural works of Christophe's reign was the Sans-Souci Palace, located in Milot, which served as the principal royal residence. Construction of the palace complex was largely completed by 1813 and included associated administrative and residential buildings intended to house members of the royal household and government.

Christophe also commissioned the construction of the Citadelle Laferrière, a large mountaintop fortress designed to defend the northern kingdom against a possible renewed French invasion. The citadel formed part of a broader defensive network of fortifications built during Christophe's reign.

Concern about the possibility of renewed French intervention influenced military planning in the northern kingdom. Diplomatic missions sent by France during the Bourbon Restoration sought to re-establish relations with Haiti, although no large-scale reconquest was undertaken during Christophe's reign.

== See also ==
- History of Haiti
