= Henri Christophe =

Haitian revolutionary; founder and ruler of the Kingdom of Haiti (1807–11)

Henri I
- Defender of the Faith
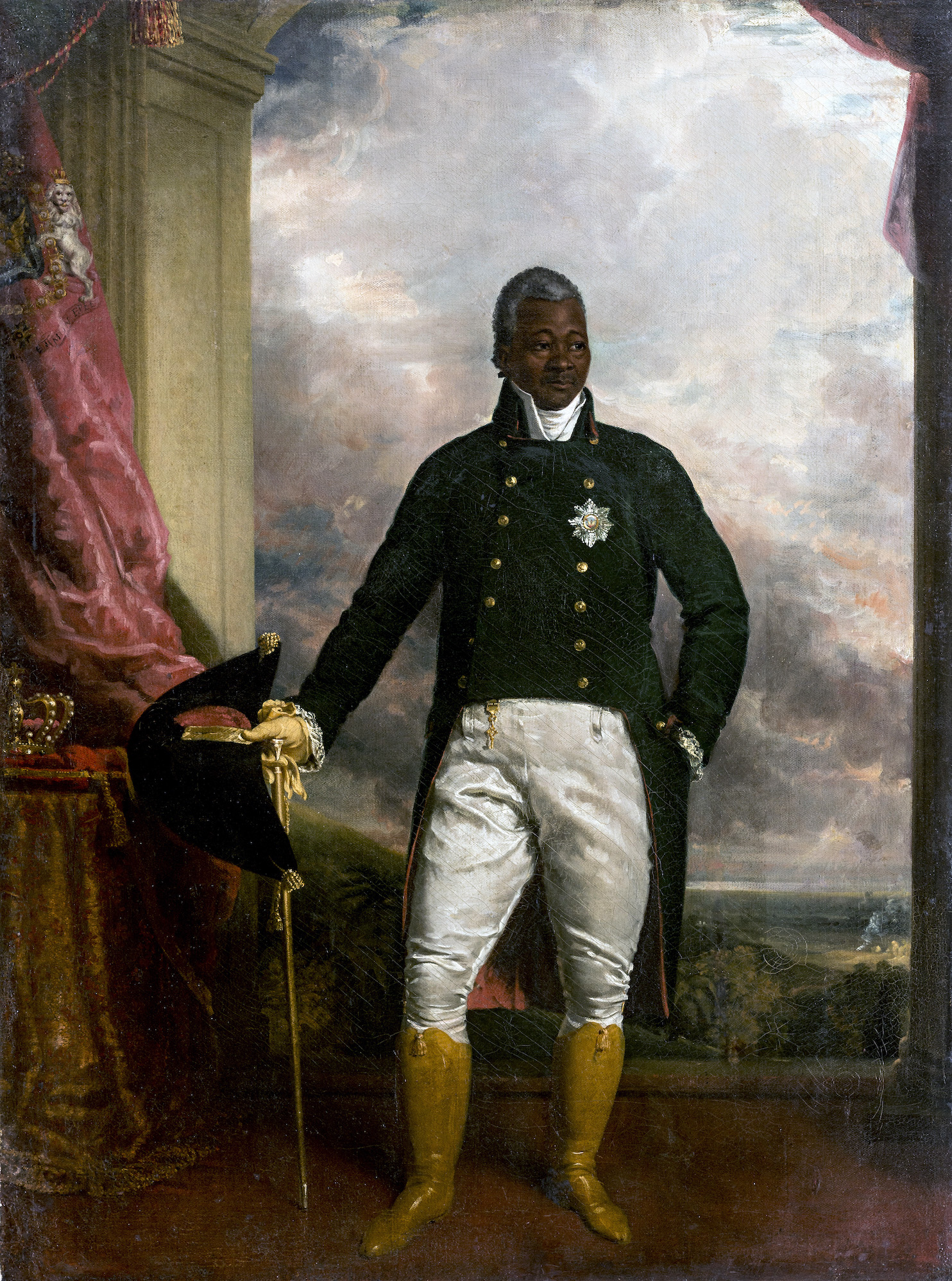
- Portrait by Richard Evans, c. 1816

King of Haiti
- Reign: 28 March 1811 – 8 October 1820
- Coronation: 2 June 1811
- Predecessor: Himself (as President of the State of Haiti)
- Successor: Henri II (unproclaimed, murdered); Jean-Pierre Boyer (as President of Haiti)

President of the State of Haiti
- In office: 17 February 1807 – 28 March 1811
- Predecessor: Jacques I (as Emperor of Haiti)
- Successor: Himself (as King of Haiti)
- Born: 6 October 1767; British Grenada
- Died: 8 October 1820 (aged 53); Cap-Henri, Kingdom of Haiti
- Burial: Citadelle Laferriere, Haiti
- Consort: Marie-Louise Coidavid
- Issue: François-Ferdinand Christophe; Françoise-Améthyste, Princess Royal; Princess Anne-Athénaïre; Jacques-Victor Henry, Prince Royal; Baron Thomas de Belliard (illegitimate)
Names
- Henry Christophe
- Father: Christophe
- Religion: Roman Catholicism
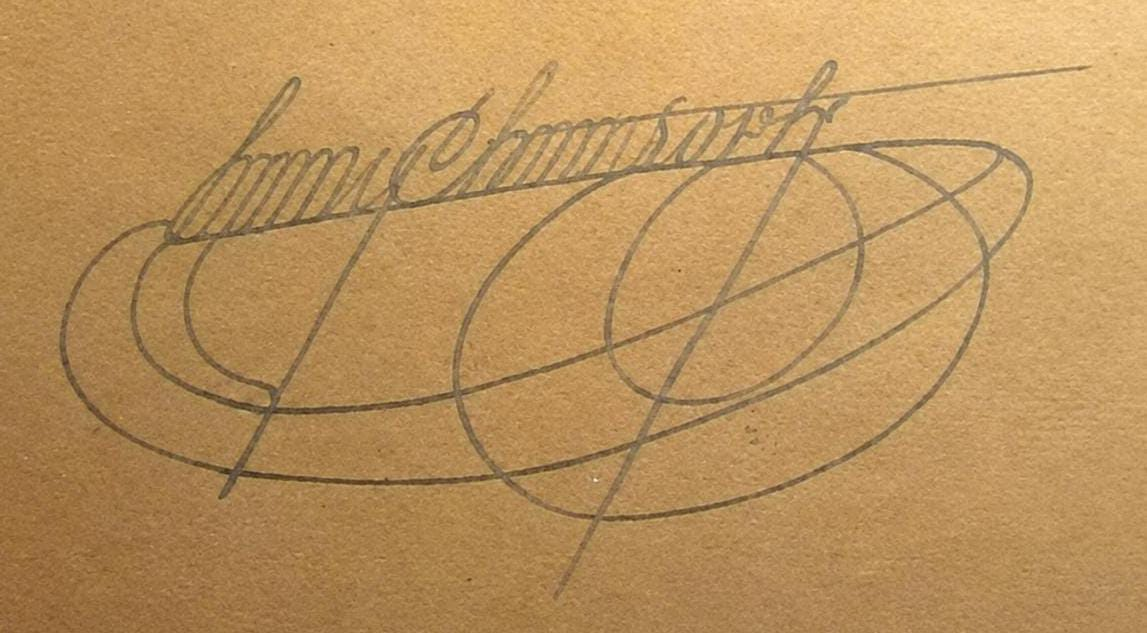
- Signature

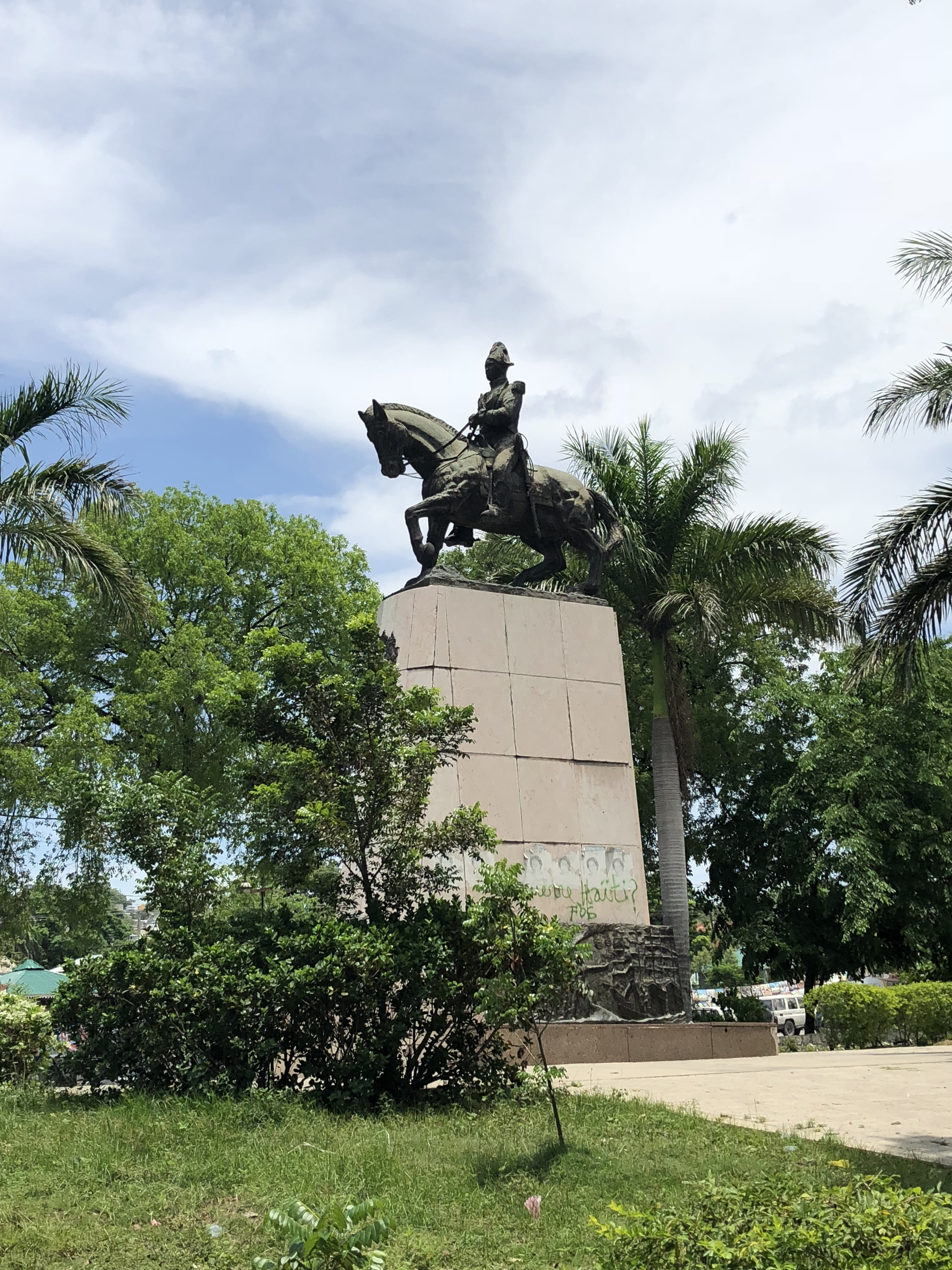
Equestrian statue of Henri Christophe in the Haitian capital Port-au-Prince

Henri Christophe (French pronunciation: [ɑ̃ʁi kʁistɔf]; 6 October 1767 – 8 October 1820) was a key leader in the Haitian Revolution and the only monarch of the Kingdom of Haiti.

Born in the British Caribbean, Christophe was possibly of Senegambian descent. Beginning with the slave uprising of 1791, he rose to power in the ranks of the Haitian revolutionary military. The revolution succeeded in gaining independence from France in 1804. In 1805 he took part under Jean-Jacques Dessalines in the capture of Santo Domingo (now Dominican Republic), against French forces who acquired the colony from Spain in the Treaty of Basel.

After Dessalines was assassinated, Christophe retreated to the Plaine-du-Nord and created a separate government. On 17 February 1807, he was elected president of the State of Haiti, as he named that area. Alexandre Pétion was elected president of the Republic of Haiti in the south. On 26 March 1811, Christophe created a kingdom in the north and was later proclaimed Henry I, King of Haïti. He also created a nobility and named his legitimate son Jacques-Victor Henry as prince and heir.

He is known for constructing Citadel Henry, now known as Citadelle Laferrière, the Sans-Souci Palace, the royal chapel of Milot, the Palais de la Belle Rivière and numerous other palaces. Under his policies of corvée, or forced labor bordering on slavery, the Kingdom earned revenues from agricultural production, primarily sugar, but the Haitian people resented the system. He reached an agreement with the United Kingdom to respect its Caribbean colonies in exchange for their warnings to his government of any French naval activity threatening Haiti. In 1820, unpopular, ill and fearing a coup, he committed suicide. Jacques-Victor, his son and heir, was assassinated 10 days later. Afterwards, General Jean-Pierre Boyer came to power and reunited the two parts of Haiti.

== Early life ==
Claims about Henri Christophe's place of birth and life before coming to prominence have been contested since the early nineteenth century. Born Christophe Henry, probably in Grenada but perhaps Saint Kitts the son of a slave mother and Christophe, a freeman, he was brought as a slave to the northern part of Saint-Domingue. In 1779 he may have served with the French forces as a drummer boy in the Chasseurs-Volontaires de Saint-Domingue, a regiment composed of free people of color (mixed-race residents of Saint-Domingue), and a few full black residents. The regiment fought in the 1779 siege of Savannah during the American Revolutionary War. It is claimed that Christophe was wounded in this battle.

As an adult, Christophe may have worked as a mason, sailor, stable hand, waiter, or billiard marker; if so, most of his pay would have gone to his master. One popular story claims that he worked in and managed La Couronne, a hotel restaurant in Cap-Français, the first capital of the French colony of Saint-Domingue and a major colonial city. There, the legend goes, he became skilled at dealing with the grand blancs, as the wealthy white French planters were called. However, none of the hotel's sales records support this claim. He was said to have gained his freedom from slavery as a young man, before the slave uprising of 1791. On 15 July 1793 he married Marie-Louise Coidavid, a member of the free black community of Cap-Français.

Beginning with the slave uprising of 1791, Christophe distinguished himself as a soldier in the Haitian Revolution and quickly rose to be a colonel during the revolutionary years. He fought for years with Toussaint Louverture in the north, participating in numerous battles during the revolution, and eventually rising to the rank of commander-in-chief at Cap-Français. By 1801, Louverture had promoted him to brigadier-general.

== Independent Haiti ==
The French deported Toussaint Louverture to France, and brought in more than 20,000 new troops under the Vicomte de Rochambeau in an effort to regain control of the colony and re-establish slavery. Jean-Jacques Dessalines led the fight to defeat the French forces. The French withdrew their 7,000 surviving troops in late 1803. As leader, Dessalines declared the independence of Saint-Domingue with its new name of Haïti in 1804.

Christophe was in charge of the northern section of the country, where he notably supervised the first steps of the construction of Citadelle Laferrière. In 1805, General Nicolas Geffrard, commander in the south, approached Christophe with a plot to kill Dessalines, the self-proclaimed emperor of Haiti; Christophe did not warn Dessalines. Christophe's influence and power in the north was such that Dessalines, though aware of opposition brewing against him in the highest circles of power, found himself unable to strike against his general. The conspiracy involved the majority of Dessalines's senior officers, including his minister of war and navy Étienne Élie Gerin, General Alexandre Pétion, commander-in-chief of the second division in the west, General Nicolas Geffrard and many others. On 16 October 1806, they signed a proclamation entitled "Resistance to Oppression", declaring the necessity to overthrow Dessalines's government, and proclaimed Christophe head of the provisional Haitian government. Dessalines was assassinated on 17 October 1806.

== Failed military invasion of 1805 ==
In 1805, French troops still controlled Santo Domingo, where they were led by General Jean-Louis Ferrand. He ordered his troops to seize all black children of both sexes below the age of 14 years to be sold into slavery. Learning of this action, Dessalines said he was outraged, and decided to use this a pretext to invade Santo Domingo, with his forces looting several towns in reprisal, such as Azua and Moca, and finally laying siege to the city of Santo Domingo, the stronghold of the French.

Christophe (referred to as Enrique Cristóbal in Spanish-language accounts), under Dessalines, attacked the towns of Moca and Santiago. The barrister Gaspar de Arredondo y Pichardo wrote, "40 children had their throats cut at the Moca's church, and the bodies found at the presbytery, which is the space that encircles the church's altar..." This event was one of several documented accounts of atrocities perpetrated by Christophe under the orders of Dessalines; they retreated to Haiti after Dessalines lifted the siege of Santo Domingo.

On 6 April 1805, having gathered all his troops, Christophe took all male prisoners to the local cemetery and proceeded to slit their throats, among them Presbyter Vásquez and 20 other priests. Later he set on fire the whole town along with its five churches. On his way out he took along, fashioned like a herd, 249 women, 430 girls and 318 boys, a steep figure considering the relatively low population of the town at that time. Alejandro Llenas wrote that Christophe took 997 from Santiago alone, and "Monte Plata, San Pedro and Cotuí were reduced to ashes, and their residents either had their throats slit or were taken captives by the thousands, like farm animals, tied up and getting beaten on their way to Haiti."

Before leaving Santo Domingo, Dessalines "gave the order to... commanders posted in conquered communities, to round up all dwellers and subdue them to prison, and thus, at first command, have them stomped by mules and other beasts upon arriving to the Haitian side."

== State and Kingdom of Haiti ==
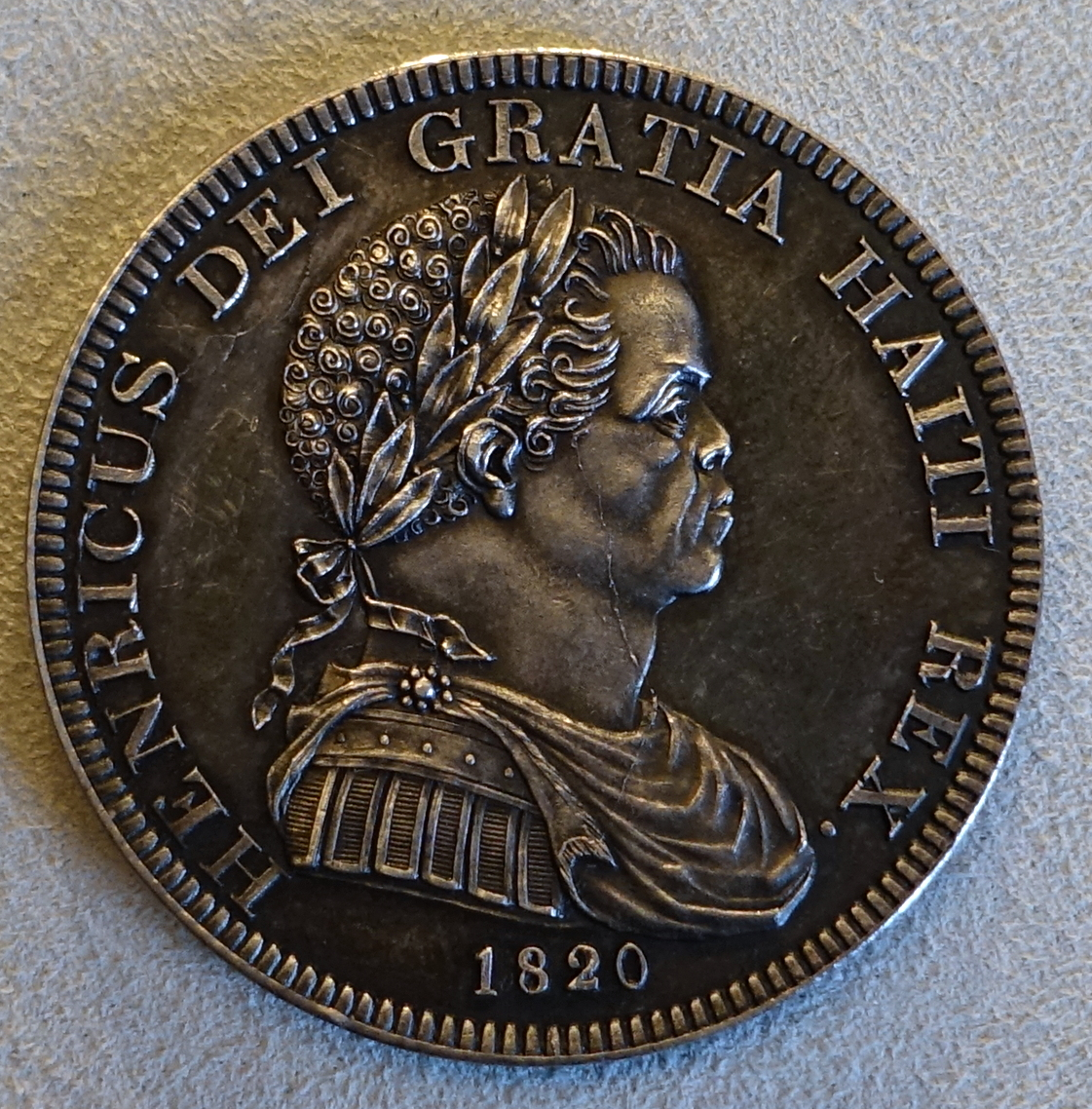
Haitian gourde coin with portrait of Henry I in the style of a Roman solidus, minted c. 1820. (Note: The coin is inscribed in Latin as "HENRICUS DEI GRATIA HAITI REX" (English: Henry, by the Grace of God, King of Haiti).)

Following a power struggle with Pétion and his supporters in the south, Christophe retreated with his followers to the Plaine-du-Nord of Haiti, the stronghold of former slaves, and created a separate government there. Christophe suspected he was also at risk of assassination in the south. In 1807, he declared himself "président et généralissime des forces de terre et de mer de l'État d'Haïti'" (English: President and Generalissimo of the armies of land and sea of the State of Haïti). Pétion became President of the "Republic of Haïti" in the south, where he was backed by General Jean-Pierre Boyer, a personne de couleur who controlled the southern armies.

In 1811, Christophe declared the northern state of Haïti a kingdom and had himself crowned by Jean-Baptiste-Joseph Brelle, the archbishop of Milot. The 1 April 1811 edict gave his full title as

Henry, par la grâce de Dieu et la Loi constitutionelle de l'État Roi d'Haïti, Souverain des Îles de la Tortue, Gonâve, et autres îles adjacentes, Destructeur de la tyrannie, Régénérateur et bienfaiteur de la nation haïtienne, Créateur de ses institutions morales, politiques et guerrières, Premier monarque couronné du Nouveau-Monde, Défenseur de la foi, Fondateur de l'ordre royal et militaire de Saint-Henri.

Henry, by the grace of God and constitutional law of the state, King of Haiti, Sovereign of Tortuga, Gonâve, and other adjacent islands, Destroyer of tyranny, Regenerator and Benefactor of the Haitian nation, Creator of her moral, political, and martial institutions, First crowned monarch of the New World, Defender of the faith, Founder of the Royal Military Order of Saint Henry.

He renamed Cap-Français as Cap-Henry (later renamed as Cap-Haïtien).

Christophe named his legitimate son Jacques-Victor Henry heir apparent, giving him the title of Prince Royal of Haïti. Christophe built six châteaux, eight palaces and the massive Citadelle Laferrière, on a mountain near Milot. With the remains of the Sans-Souci Palace, it has been designated as a UNESCO World Heritage Site. Nine years later, at the end of his monarchy, Henry increased the number of designated nobility from the original 87 to 134. Some Europeans mocked his aristocracy. The titles of the Duc de Limonade (Julien Prévost, Christophe's secretary of state) and Duc de Marmelade (Jean-Pierre Richard, governor of Cap Henry) were considered particularly comic by those unaware that they were derived from place names given by the previous French colonists.

The two parts of Haiti struggled to increase agricultural production to recover from the expensive and damaging wars. The United States had only recently ended its arms and goods embargo against Haiti, and began war with United Kingdom in the War of 1812. Christophe had to choose whether to enforce a version of the slave plantation system to increase agricultural production, or to subdivide the land into parcels for peasants' subsistence farming. The latter was President Pétion's policy in the south. King Henry chose to enforce corvée plantation work, a system of forced labor, in lieu of taxes, but also began his massive building projects.

He made an agreement with Britain that Haiti would not threaten its Caribbean colonies; in return, the Royal Navy would warn Haiti of imminent attacks from French troops. In 1807, the Parliament of the United Kingdom passed the Slave Trade Act 1807 to abolish the importation of slaves into the British Empire. Because of increased bilateral trade with Britain, Christophe's government earned an enormous sum of British pounds for his treasury. By contrast, Petion's southern Haiti became much poorer because the land-share system reduced agricultural productivity, and exports fell.

Coat of Arms of the Kingdom of Haiti 1811-1814

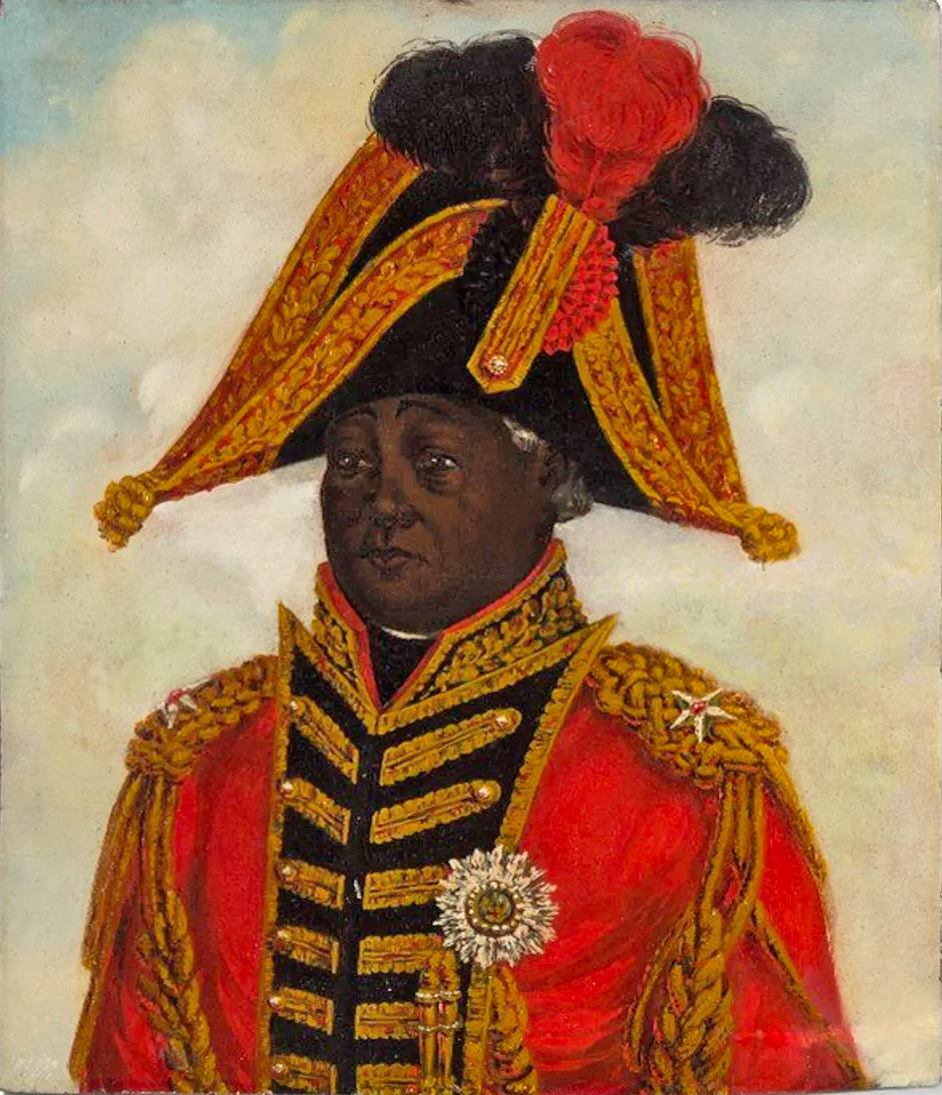
In this portrait painted by Johann Gottfried Eiffe, a German artist in the Royal Court, Henry wears the grand cross of the Royal and Military Order of St. Henry (Ordre Royal et Militaire de Saint Henry)

== French attempt to regain Haiti ==
After Napoleon abdicated in April 1814, King Louis XVIII attempted to take back St Domingue. The Treaty of Paris, ratified on 30 May, gave neighboring Santo Domingo back to Spain, and granted an extra five years of slave trade in which to recoup losses entailed by abolition of slavery. In October 1814, Henry I's ministers made public evidence of French schemes to try and recover its former colony, in the form of letters carried by French agents captured on the island. In the ensuing uproar, the nation mobilized for the expected French invasion and began an international public relations campaign. From November on, reprints of Haitian pamphlets, newspapers and open letters appeared in print media across the Atlantic world. Such broadsides and editorial interventions were accompanied by critical theoretical texts on race and colonialism such as Pompée Valentin Vastey's The Colonial System Unveiled (Le Système colonial dévoilé). Simultaneously, Henry opened up communication with the most prominent English abolitionists: his letter to William Wilberforce arrived on 5 January 1815, and began a new level of engagement between the United Kingdom and the Kingdom of Haiti.

== End of reign ==
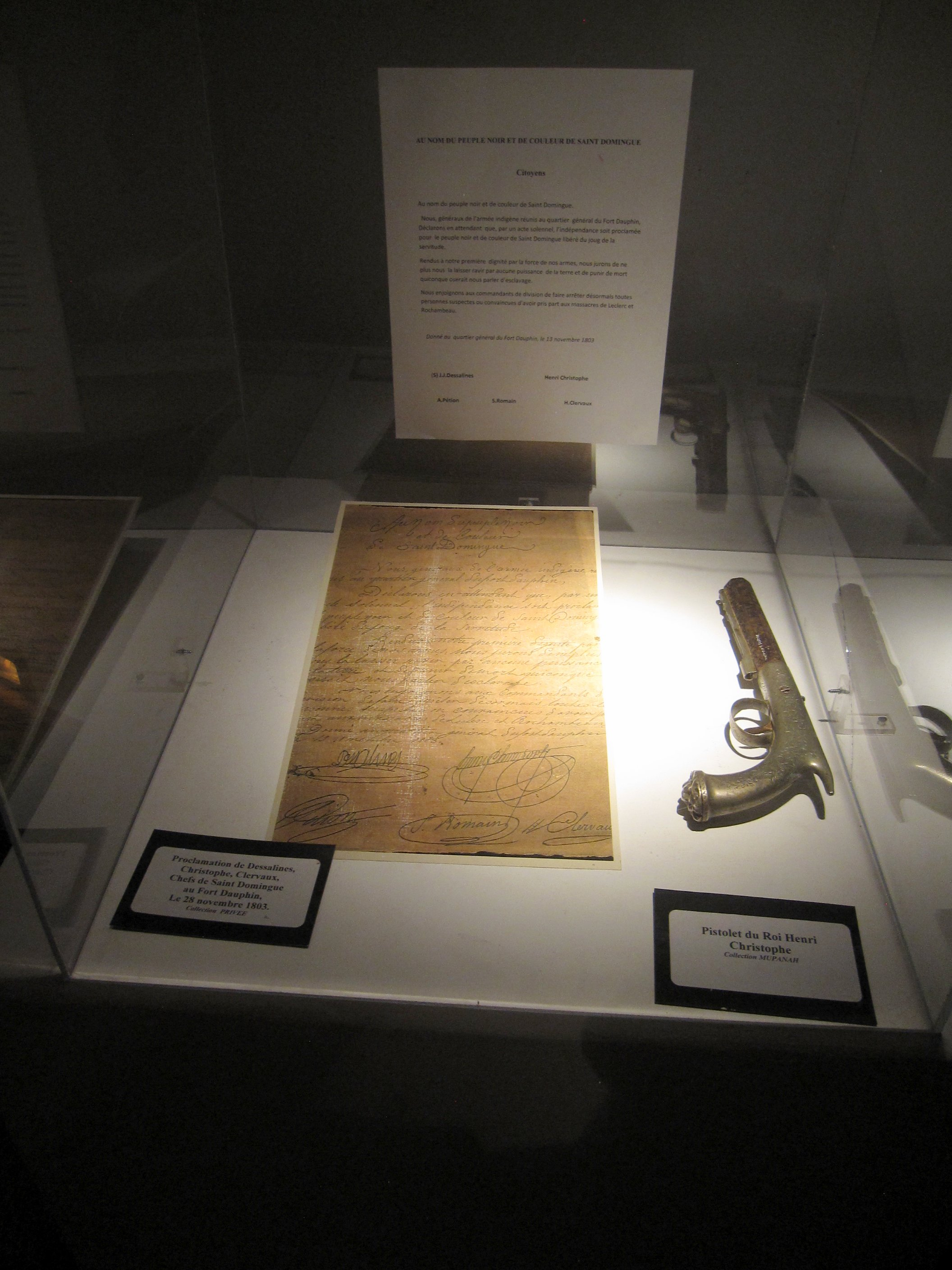
The pistol used in Henri Christophe's suicide

Despite promoting education and establishing a legal system called the Code Henry, King Henry was an unpopular, autocratic monarch. His realm was constantly challenged by Petion's government of the south, in which gens de couleur held power. Toward the end of Christophe's reign, public sentiment opposed what many considered his feudal policies of forced labor, which he intended to use to develop the country. Ill and infirm at age fifty-three, King Henry died by suicide by shooting himself with a silver bullet rather than risk a coup and assassination. His son and heir was assassinated 10 days later. He was buried within the Citadelle Laferrière.

His descendants continued to be among the powerful of Haiti. Pierre Nord Alexis, President of Haiti from 1902 to 1908, was Christophe's grandson. Michèle Bennett, who married Jean-Claude Duvalier and was First Lady of Haiti during his administration (1980 to 1986), is Christophe's great-great-great-granddaughter.

== Sources ==
- Cheesman, Clive (2007), The Armorial of Haiti: Symbols of Nobility in the Reign of Henry Christophe, London: The College of Arms, ISBN 978-0950698021.
- Clammer, Paul (2023), Black Crown: Henry Christophe, the Haitian Revolution and the Caribbean's Forgotten Kingdom, London: Hurst Publishers, ISBN 9781787387799.
- Cole, Hubert (1967), Christophe: King of Haiti, London: Eyre & Spottiswoode.
- Griggs, E.L.; Prator, C.H., eds. (1968), Henry Christophe and Thomas Clarkson: A Correspondence.
- James, C.L.R. (1968), The Black Jacobins.
- Vandercook, John (1928), Black Majesty: The Life of Christophe, King of Haiti, New York: Harper and Brothers Publishing.

Preceded by Jacques I Emperor of Haïti	President of the State of Haïti; 1807–1811 King of Haïti; 1811–1820	Succeeded by Jean-Pierre Boyer; President of Haïti
