= Jean-Baptiste-Joseph Brelle =

Grand Archbishop of Haiti (1751–1819)

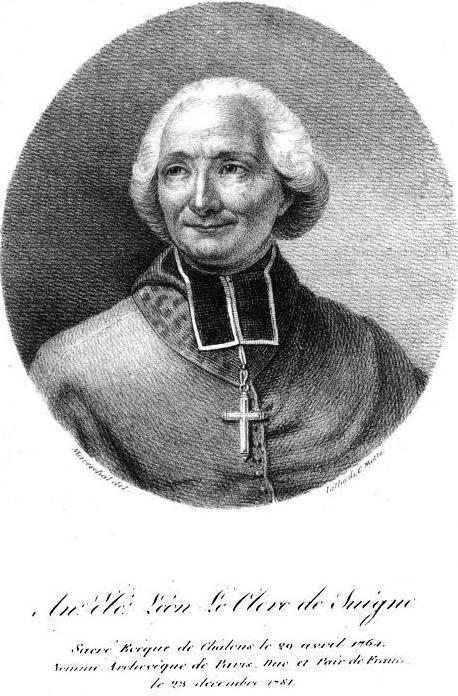
Jean-Baptiste-Joseph Brelle

Jean-Baptiste-Joseph Brelle (August 18, 1754 – July 1819) was the Grand Archbishop of Haiti. He also crowned the first two rulers of Haiti. Haiti being a Catholic country far from Rome, from the independence of the country in 1804, Brelle was chosen as representative of the Roman Catholic Church in the country. He became its Grand Archbishop and thus governed like the Pope while respecting the Vatican.
