= Jacques-Victor Henry =

Heir apparent to the throne of the Kingdom of Haiti

Henri II
- Prince Royal of Haiti
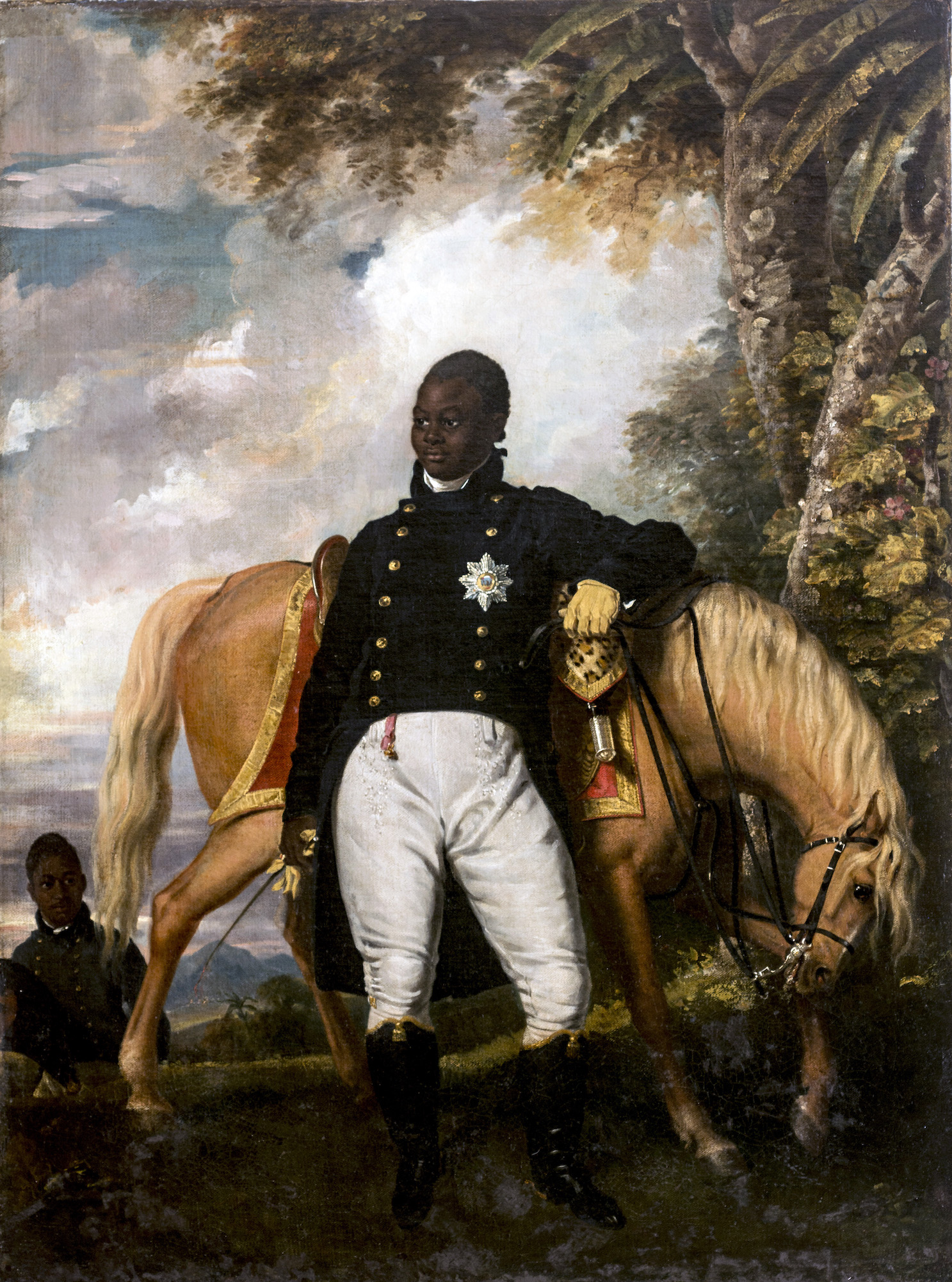
- Portrait by Richard Evans, c. 1816

King of Haiti (unproclaimed)
- Reign: 8 October 1820 – 18 October 1820
- Predecessor: Henri I
- Successor: Jean-Pierre Boyer as President of Haïti
- Born: 3 March 1804; Empire of Haiti
- Died: 18 October 1820 (aged 16); Sans-Souci Palace, Kingdom of Haiti
Names
- Jacques-Victor Henri Christophe
- Father: Henri I
- Mother: Marie-Louise Coidavid
- Religion: Roman Catholicism

Jacques-Victor Henry, Prince Royal of Haiti (3 March 1804 – 18 October 1820) was the heir apparent to the throne of the Kingdom of Haiti.

He was the youngest child of Henri Christophe, then a general in the Haitian Army, by his wife Marie-Louise Coidavid. His father became President of the State of Haiti in 1807, and on March 28, 1811, he was proclaimed King of Haiti. The Prince Royal had two older brothers who both died before the proclamation of the kingdom, so he became the heir apparent with the title Prince Royal of Haiti, which came with the style of Royal Highness.

== Death ==
Following the death of his father on October 8, 1820, the Prince Royal should have been proclaimed as King Henri II of Haiti, but the country was already in turmoil and he never had a chance. Ten days later, he was murdered after being bayoneted by revolutionaries at the Sans-Souci Palace.
