= United Nations Security Council Resolution 601 =

UN Security Council Resolution 601
- Namibia
- Date: 30 October 1987
- Meeting no.: 2,759
- Code: S/RES/601 (Document)
- Subject: Namibia
- Voting summary: 14 voted for; None voted against; 1 abstained
- Result: Adopted

Security Council composition
- Permanent members: China; France; Soviet Union; United Kingdom; United States
- Non-permanent members: Argentina; Bulgaria; Congo; Ghana; Italy; Japan; United Arab Emirates; Venezuela; West Germany; Zambia

United Nations Security Council resolution 601, adopted on 30 October 1987, after recalling resolutions 269 (1969), 276 (1970), 301 (1971), 385 (1976), 431 (1978), 432 (1978), 435 (1978), 439 (1978), 532 (1983), 539 (1983) and 566 (1985), the council again condemned South Africa for its continued "illegal" occupation of Namibia and its refusal to comply with previous resolutions.

The resolution reaffirmed the direct responsibility of the United Nations over the territory of Namibia, noting that all outstanding issues relevant to Resolution 435 (1978) have been resolved. It also welcomed the pledge by the South West Africa People's Organization to sign and observe a ceasefire with the South African Defence Force, therefore the council authorised the Secretary-General Javier Pérez de Cuéllar to arrange a ceasefire between both parties in order for the emplacement of the United Nations Transition Assistance Group in Namibia.

The council also urged Member States to assist the Secretary-General and his staff with the implementation with the current resolution, and requested the Secretary-General to report back as soon as possible regarding developments in the region.

Resolution 601 was adopted by 14 votes to none, with one abstention from the United States.

== See also ==
- Internal resistance to apartheid
- List of United Nations Security Council Resolutions 601 to 700 (1987–1991)
- South African Border War
- Apartheid
- United Nations Commissioner for Namibia
