= United Nations Security Council Resolution 566 =

UN Security Council Resolution 566
- Namibia
- Date: 19 June 1985
- Meeting no.: 2,595
- Code: S/RES/566 (Document)
- Subject: Namibia
- Voting summary: 13 voted for; None voted against; 2 abstained
- Result: Adopted

Security Council composition
- Permanent members: China; France; Soviet Union; United Kingdom; United States
- Non-permanent members: Australia; Burkina Faso; Denmark; Egypt; India; Madagascar; Peru; Thailand; Trinidad and Tobago; Ukrainian SSR

United Nations Security Council resolution 566, adopted on 19 June 1985, after recalling resolutions 269 (1969), 276 (1970), 301 (1971), 385 (1976), 431 (1978), 432 (1978), 435 (1978), 439 (1978), 532 (1983) and 539 (1983), the Council expressed concern at the tension and instability caused the continued occupation of Namibia (then known as South West Africa) by South Africa, noting the apartheid policies implemented in the territory and that the territory was used as a springboard for attacks on other southern African countries.

The Council stated its international responsibility over Namibia, noting that 1985 marked the 40th anniversary of the founding of the United Nations, as well as the 25th anniversary of the adoption of the Declaration on the Granting of Independence to Colonial Countries and Peoples, expressing the concern that the question of Namibia had yet to be resolved.

Resolution 566, welcoming the worldwide campaign against apartheid, condemned South Africa for its continuing illegal occupation of Namibia and its defiance of resolutions on the topic. The resolution regarded the interim government in Windhoek as illegal, and declared that no recognition will be offered to it. It also supported the Namibian people in their "legitimate struggle", asking Member States to provide moral and material support to them.

The Council went on to reject South Africa's efforts to link the independence of Namibia to irrelevant or extraneous issues incompatible with Resolution 435, and condemning all obstruction of it. Therefore, the Council insisted the United Nations plan is the only internationally accepted basis for a peaceful settlement of the issue.

The resolution continued by outlining the Secretary-General's role in consultations with the Government of South Africa and resolving issues related to the implementation of Resolution 435, urging South Africa to cooperate with him, and that failure to do so will compel the Security Council to take further action under Chapter VII.

Finally, the Council reminded Member States to continue to enforce the arms embargo against South Africa, including restrictions on investments, maritime and aerial relations, sport and cultural relations, and probitation of the sale of krugerrands.

Resolution 566 was adopted by 13 votes to none, with two abstentions from the United Kingdom and United States.

== See also ==
- Internal resistance to apartheid
- List of United Nations Security Council Resolutions 501 to 600 (1982–1987)
- Apartheid
- United Nations Commissioner for Namibia
