= United Nations Security Council Resolution 539 =

UN Security Council Resolution 539
- Namibia
- Date: 28 October 1983
- Meeting no.: 2,492
- Code: S/RES/539 (Document)
- Subject: Namibia
- Voting summary: 14 voted for; None voted against; 1 abstained
- Result: Adopted

Security Council composition
- Permanent members: China; France; Soviet Union; United Kingdom; United States
- Non-permanent members: Guyana; Jordan; Malta; Netherlands; Nicaragua; Pakistan; Poland; Togo; Zaire; Zimbabwe

United Nations Security Council resolution 539, adopted on 28 October 1983, after hearing a report from the Secretary-General and reaffirming resolutions 301 (1971), 385 (1976), 431 (1978), 432 (1978), 435 (1978), 439 (1978) and 532 (1983), the council condemned South Africa's continued occupation of Namibia, then known as South West Africa, and the tension and instability prevailing in southern Africa as a result.

The resolution also condemned South Africa for its obstruction of the implementation of previous resolutions on Namibia, and rejected its attempts to link irrelevant issues to the declination of independence of Namibia. The council reaffirmed the only basis for a peaceful settlement of the issue is to allow Namibian independence.

Finally, the council urged South Africa to cooperate with the Secretary-General on plans for implementing the United Nations provisions outlined in Resolution 435, requesting him to report back to the council by 31 December 1983.

Resolution 539 was adopted with 14 votes to none, while France abstained from voting.

== See also ==
- List of United Nations Security Council Resolutions 501 to 600 (1982–1987)
- Namibian War of Independence
- South African Border Wars
- South Africa under apartheid
