= Koevoet =

Former South West Africa Police counterinsurgency organisation

- Operation K SWAPOL-COIN / SWAPOL-TIN
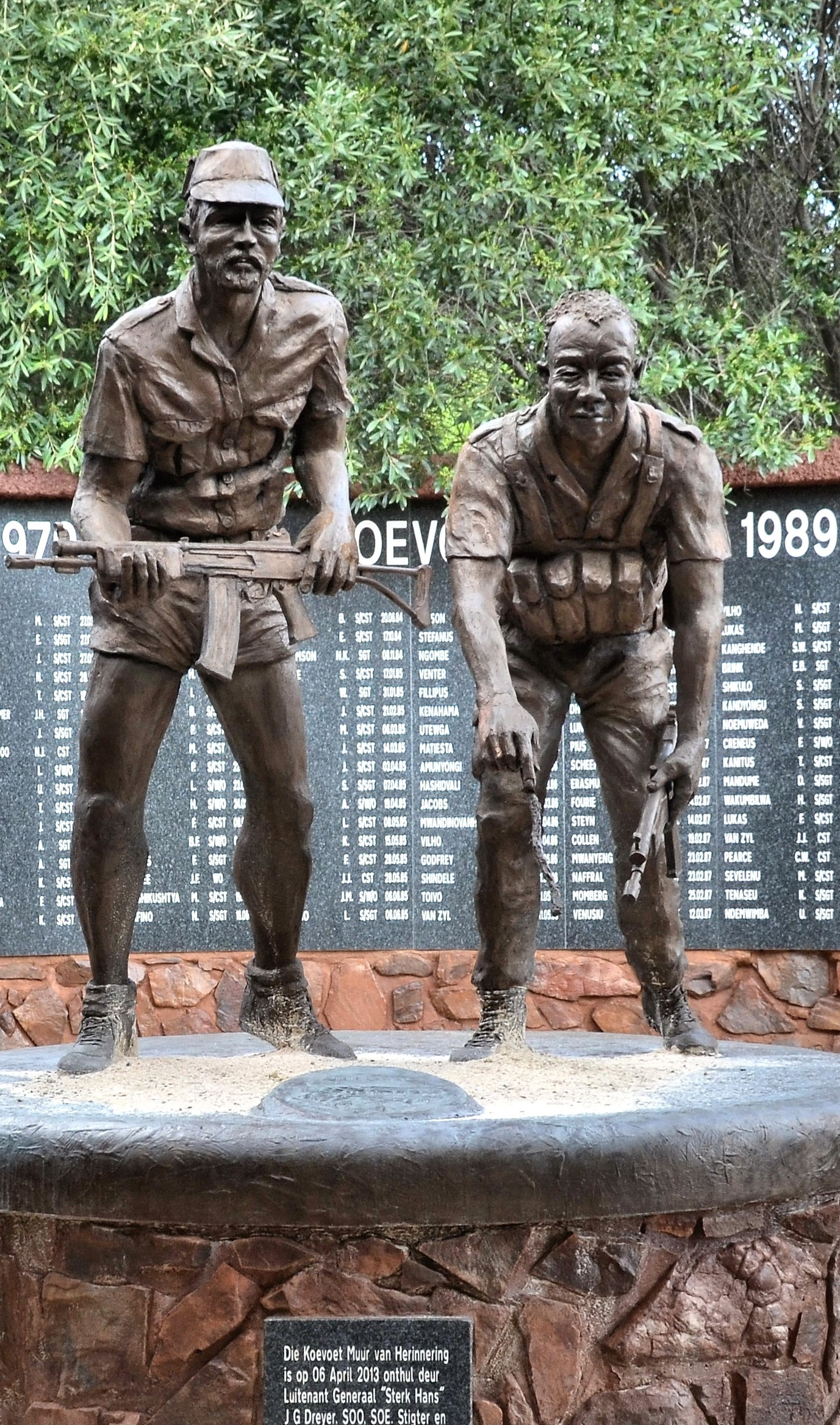
- Koevoet Memorial at the Voortrekker Monument, Pretoria

Agency overview
- Formed: June 1979
- Preceding agency: (South Africa) South African Police (various)
- Dissolved: 30 October 1989
- Superseding agency: (Namibia) Special Field Force
- Type: Paramilitary
- Jurisdiction: South West Africa
- Headquarters: Oshakati, Oshana Region
- Employees: 3,000 (c. 1988)
- Ministers responsible: Louis Pienaar, Administrator-General; Louis le Grange, Minister of Law and Order
- Agency executive: Hans Dreyer, Major General (1979–1990)
- Parent agency: (South Africa) South West African Police (SWAPOL)

Koevoet ([ˈkufut], Afrikaans for crowbar, also known as Operation K or SWAPOL-COIN) was the counterinsurgency branch of the South West African Police (SWAPOL). Its formations included white South African police officers, usually seconded from the South African Security Branch or Special Task Force, and black volunteers from Ovamboland. Koevoet was patterned after the Selous Scouts, a multiracial Rhodesian military unit which specialised in counter-insurgency operations. Its title was an allusion to the metaphor of "prying" insurgents from the civilian population.

Koevoet was active during the South African Border War between 1979 and 1989, during which it carried out hundreds of search and destroy operations against the People's Liberation Army of Namibia (PLAN). Koevoet's methods were controversial, and the unit was accused of committing numerous atrocities against civilians. Over the course of the war, it killed or captured 3,225 insurgents and participated in 1,615 individual engagements. Koevoet was disbanded in 1989 as part of the implementation of United Nations Security Council Resolution 435, which effectively ended the South African Border War and ushered in South West African independence as Namibia.

== History ==
=== Background ===
Following the end of World War I, the German Empire was dismantled and its African colonies granted to Allied nations as various League of Nations mandates. The mandate system was formed as a compromise between those who advocated an Allied annexation of former German and Turkish territories, and another proposition put forward by those who wished to grant them to an international trusteeship until they could govern themselves. South Africa received the former German possession of South West Africa and was permitted to administer it until that territory's inhabitants were prepared for political self-determination. However, the South African government interpreted the mandate as a veiled annexation and took steps to integrate South West Africa as a domestic province.

South Africa's attempts to absorb South West Africa became a matter of contention during the 1960s as a result of the increasingly widespread decolonisation of the African continent. Over the next decade, low intensity conflicts broke out in many of the remaining European colonies as militant African nationalist movements emerged, often with direct backing from the Soviet Union and revolutionary left-wing governments in the Middle East. The nationalists were often encouraged to take up arms by the success of indigenous anti-colonial guerrilla movements around the world, namely in French Indochina and French Algeria, as well as the rhetoric of contemporary African statesmen such as Ahmed Ben Bella, Gamal Abdel Nasser, and Julius Nyerere.

During the early 1960s, new nationalist parties such as the South West African National Union (SWANU) and South West African People's Organisation (SWAPO) made determined attempts to establish indigenous political structures for an independent South West Africa. In 1962, SWAPO formed a militant wing, known as the South West African Liberation Army (SWALA), and began sending recruits to Egypt and the Soviet Union for guerrilla training. In 1966 SWALA initiated an insurgency against the South African government, sparking what would later evolve into a wider regional conflict known as the South African Border War.

As the war intensified, so did international sympathy for SWAPO's cause. The United Nations declared that South Africa had failed in its obligations to ensure the moral and material well-being of the indigenous inhabitants of South West Africa, and had thus disavowed its own mandate. On 12 June 1968, the UN General Assembly adopted a resolution which proclaimed that, in accordance with the desires of its people, South West Africa be renamed Namibia. United Nations Security Council Resolution 269, adopted in August 1969, declared South Africa's continued occupation of Namibia illegal. In recognition of this landmark decision, SWALA was renamed the People's Liberation Army of Namibia (PLAN).

=== Formation of Koevoet ===
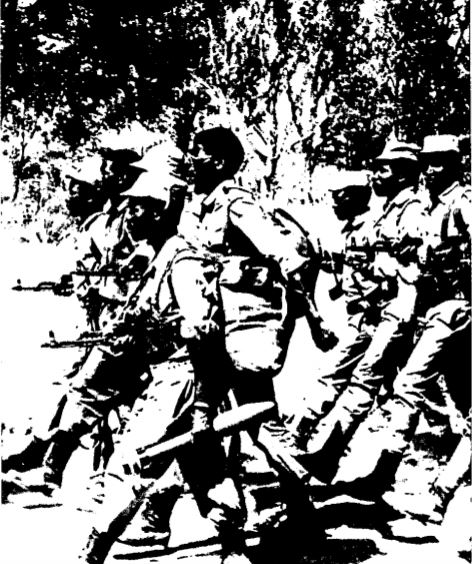
PLAN insurgents on the march

From the early to late 1970s, the brunt of counter-insurgency operations was borne by the South African Defence Force (SADF). The SADF's primary source of manpower were white national servicemen fulfilling their terms of compulsory military service under the leadership of professional career officers. The initial commitment of South African troops to the South West African theatre in 1974 was about 15,000 men. Beginning the same year, however, there was also increasingly widespread enlistment of local armed auxiliaries and semi-official militias. The most powerful armed group outside the direct command structure of the SADF emerged in Ovamboland, SWAPO's traditional political stronghold and the source of its support base. The Ovamboland civil administration employed a local militia known as the Ovambo Home Guard, established to protect local officials who were often the target of PLAN assassination attempts.

The Ovambo Home Guard was assembled, as time passed, into larger numbered units or attached to regular SADF battalions. By late 1978, the number of Ovambo Home Guard personnel stood at about 3,000. Their relative effectiveness compared to national servicemen sent out from South Africa, who were unfamiliar with the terrain and environment and had more difficulty adapting to Ovamboland, was noted by the government. This and other developments resulted in a deliberate policy of "Namibianisation", a reference to the Vietnamization programme the United States had pursued during the Vietnam War. The war effort became less likely to entail clear-cut confrontations between foreign South African troops and local PLAN insurgents, but significant numbers of Namibians fighting under South African command. The main objectives of Namibianisation were to establish a self-sufficient military infrastructure in South West Africa, reinforce the perception of a domestic civil conflict rather than an independence struggle, and reduce casualty rates among South Africa's national servicemen, to which the government was especially sensitive. Furthermore, the SADF was overstretched and if efficient local forces could be raised to take over the bulk of the defensive and local security tasks, it would be more free to pursue conventional offensive operations.

Both the SADF and South African Police (SAP) launched parallel initiatives to create Ovambo counter-insurgency units between 1976 and 1980. The SADF's programme resulted in 101 Battalion, while the SAP formed Koevoet. A senior officer with the SAP's Security Branch, Hans Dreyer, was appointed to lead the latter. Dreyer had served with the SAP in Rhodesia during the Rhodesian Bush War and drew heavily on his operational experiences there while shaping Koevoet's mandate and organisational structure. Koevoet was to be patterned directly after the Selous Scouts, a Rhodesian special forces unit which included large numbers of former insurgents. The SAP especially appreciated the small unit tactics of the Selous Scouts, which had demonstrated how a few operators, disguised as insurgents and trained to high levels of subterfuge, could have an effect utterly disproportionate to their size.

Koevoet was established in June 1979, at which time the unit consisted of six white South African policemen and 60 of the most skilled trackers from the Ovambo Home Guard. The trackers received three months of additional reconnaissance training from SADF special forces before being deployed into Ovamboland. They were also instructed in criminal investigation techniques and police procedure by the SAP. In May 1979, they captured their first insurgent.

Koevoet was formally known as "Operation K" of the SAP Security Branch's special operations division, but that title was almost never used. Its existence remained a closely guarded secret until June 1980, when church newspapers in Ovamboland began circulating rumours of a new special forces group linked to assassination of SWAPO sympathisers. The rumours had their basis in a "death list" of prominent Ovambo political figures and businessmen who were covert sympathisers of SWAPO, which was allegedly recovered from the body of a local politician killed in a motor accident. A number of individuals on the list were subsequently assassinated. While South Africa denied the report, officials did name Koevoet and praise it for its efficiency.

Koevoet's initial role was to engage in intelligence gathering for the SADF, but it soon adopted its own counter-insurgency campaign of infiltration and raids. Being a police unit, Koevoet also investigated politically motivated murders and property destruction. The unit rapidly expanded to about 3,000 personnel, about the size of the Ovambo Home Guard. At first the numbers of recruits were modest, due in part to limited training facilities and the time it would take to provide them with officers. This problem was partly solved by training Koevoet recruits at the Police Counter-Insurgency School in Maleoskop, South Africa. There, the recruits received instruction on a unique hybrid syllabus which combined specialist police skills such as anti-riot tactics, road security, and conventional counter-terrorism with basic infantry training resembling that of the SADF and counter-insurgency theory. The disbandment of the Selous Scouts in 1980 provided Koevoet with an influx of Rhodesian officers from that unit who were recruited by the SAP. White Namibians were also recruited in modest numbers as Koevoet officers, although the SAP faced stiff competition in this regard from the SADF. Most white South African policemen were transferred to Koevoet as a result of personal referrals.

The overwhelming majority of black Koevoet operators were applicants from the Ovambo Home Guard, who wanted regular employment and better pay. The only prerequisite was that they had to speak Afrikaans or English, in order to communicate with their white officers. The SAP occasionally recruited Ovambos from Angola, including unemployed former soldiers of the Portuguese colonial army and insurgents from the National Union for the Total Independence of Angola (UNITA), who met these qualifications. Competition for employment with Koevoet was fierce due to the relatively high pay and benefits, including life insurance, offered by the SAP.

=== Operational service ===
PLAN units operating in Ovamboland were kept supplied by a constant flow of insurgents and war materiel along external infiltration routes through Angola. Koevoet monitored an area adjacent to the Angolan border with screening patrols coordinated between three permanent base strongpoints at Opuwo, Rundu, and Oshakati. It was also permitted to establish its own internment facility for captured PLAN prisoners just north of Windhoek. Patrols were carried out in Casspir mine-protected vehicles and sometimes lasted for weeks on end. Koevoet operators spent most of their time following suspicious tracks in search of insurgents, sometimes for over a hundred kilometres. PLAN was forced to alter its tactics accordingly. Following raids and attacks, PLAN cadres would scatter. Many ceased wearing military boots with readily identifiable sole patterns and walked barefoot or in civilian shoes. They camouflaged their tracks, retraced their steps, and changed footwear to throw off Koevoet trackers. More commonly, the insurgents would withdraw until they had reached appropriate terrain, then ambush the Koevoet response team.

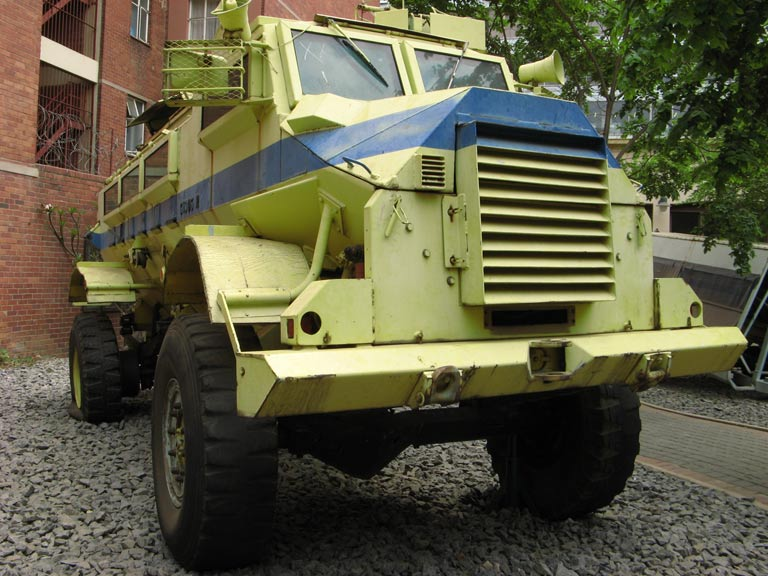
SAP Casspir similar to those utilised by Koevoet.

In April 1980, Administrator-General Gerrit Viljoen announced that transfer of some control over local military and police forces to Namibians would occur once the necessary structures were implemented. This marked a new step in South Africa's Namibianisation campaign, and in 1985 Koevoet was formally integrated with the South West African Police (SWAPOL). At the time, 80% of Koevoet's manpower consisted of locals from Ovamboland, with the remaining 20% being white officers and Ovambos from elsewhere, namely Angola. Off-duty Koevoet operators were prime targets for PLAN assassination attempts; between 1979 and 1982, for example, at least 198 were killed by insurgents at home. By 1982, about 40 Koevoet operators were being killed in targeted assassinations per year. Their families were also subject to intimidation. Thereafter, the South African government permitted Koevoet personnel to retain their weapons at home.

In 1983, Koevoet attracted considerable controversy when an Angolan citizen serving with the unit, Jonas Paulus, was convicted of murder, attempted rape, and armed robbery by the South West African Supreme Court in Windhoek. Paulus and an accomplice went on a crime spree with a captured PLAN rifle, and had identified themselves as insurgents. The duo killed an elderly farmer and abducted several young girls, after which they were captured by other members of Koevoet and turned over to the civil police. Paulus was sentenced to death and hanged in Windhoek on 4 June 1985. Around the same time, a white Koevoet non-commissioned officer, Norman Abrahams, appeared in court on charges of having murdered a suspected SWAPO sympathiser in his custody. The charges were dropped after the prosecution failed to establish whether Abrahams or one of several other Koevoet personnel present had actually committed the murder; the South African government reached an out of court settlement with the victim's family. These cases were notable because they generated considerable publicity about Koevoet in South Africa itself, and forced the unit to disclose details of its operations previously kept secret. For example, the use of a PLAN weapon by Paulus was explained by the fact that Koevoet possessed an inventory of captured uniforms and arms, which members often used to impersonate insurgents. An Atrocities Liaison Committee was also established in Ovamboland to review excesses committed by members of the security forces while on duty.

The Paulus and Abrahams trials caused a public outcry, compelling SWAPOL to issue a statement that it would not condone any atrocities committed by Koevoet and would not hesitate to prosecute members of that unit. For the first time SWAPOL's civil police and Criminal Investigation Department (CID) began internal investigations of Koevoet operations.

In 1977, South West Africa's administrator-general had issued AG Proclamation 9, which empowered any non-commissioned officer of the SAP (and subsequently, SWAPOL) to arrest and detain anybody in designated "security districts", including Ovamboland, without a warrant. Koevoet invoked this proclamation to detain suspects for up to thirty days without trial, and simply evoked it again once the thirty days had expired, in effect giving itself the power of indefinite detention. Its transition of jurisdiction to SWAPOL, however, opened the unit to more scrutiny in the local judicial system, and in 1986 the Windhoek Supreme Court ruled that Koevoet could not hold suspects for more than thirty days without legal representation. This was because captured insurgents were not held as prisoners of war, but rather apprehended by a police unit for trial in open courts as common law criminals.

=== The 1988 ceasefire and final PLAN offensive ===
As a result of the Brazzaville Protocol and subsequent Tripartite Accord, South Africa agreed to grant Namibia independence in exchange for a parallel Cuban withdrawal from Angola and a commitment by the Angolan government to cease all assistance to PLAN. Under the terms of the agreement, both the Cuban withdrawal and the independence process in Namibia would be monitored by two multinational peacekeeping forces known as the United Nations Angola Verification Mission (UNAVEM) and the United Nations Transition Assistance Group (UNTAG), respectively. UNTAG planned to confine both PLAN and the SADF to their respective bases, demobilise all paramilitary forces that belonged to neither the SADF nor to the civil police, and supervise the return of refugees via designated entry points to participate in new elections.

PLAN and the South African security forces began observing an informal truce which went into effect on 10 August 1988. This was scheduled to become a permanent ceasefire on 1 April 1989, at which time UNTAG was supposed to arrive in force and monitor the belligerent parties. However, UNTAG's deployment was beset with delays, and PLAN was able to begin covertly moving its forces in Angola to the border. UN Secretary-General Javier Pérez de Cuéllar declared that Koevoet was considered a paramilitary force not part of the SADF or the civil police, and should therefore be disbanded. The continued existence of that unit, he claimed, contravened the spirit of the independence process and their use of heavy weapons violated specific provisions concerning what equipment SWAPOL was permitted to carry to maintain basic law and order. South Africa bowed to pressure and effectively deactivated Koevoet in December 1988, although the unit could still be remobilised as needed.

PLAN had consistently maintained that a precondition of any settlement was that it be permitted to establish base camps inside Namibia. The South African government consistently rejected PLAN's demands, likely because it feared the insurgents would interfere with the political process. The strategy of taking advantage of a ceasefire to establish an armed presence inside the country had previously been employed by other militant groups in the region, namely the Zimbabwe African National Liberation Army (ZANLA).

PLAN interpreted a general directive by the UN for all Namibian exiles to return home as de facto approval for it to begin its deployment. The insurgent commanders assured their troops that sympathetic UN personnel would provide them secure passage once inside Namibia. On the morning of 1 April, the first PLAN cadres crossed into Ovamboland, unhindered by UNTAG, which had failed to monitor their activity in Angola due to the delays in its arrival. South Africa accused PLAN of violating the ceasefire. With tensions rising, de Cuéllar immediately contacted SWAPO's delegation at New York and ordered it to rein in PLAN.

At the end of the day, with no signs of the PLAN advance abating, the UN Special Representative in Namibia, Martti Ahtisaari, lifted all restrictions confining the SADF to its bases. The responsibility of stopping the incursion fell to SWAPOL until six battalions of South African army regulars could be mobilised and deployed to Ovamboland. In light of this situation, Ahtisaari granted the South African government's request to remobilise Koevoet. The decision was made after joint consultations with South African Foreign Minister Pik Botha and UNTAG commander Dewan Prem Chand. The number of Koevoet operators authorised for remobilisation was approximately the size of two battalions.

Koevoet and other SWAPOL units were able to fight off PLAN in a series of chaotic delaying actions until the SADF's arrival. Combined SADF and SWAPOL forces proceeded to drive PLAN back across the border in a counteroffensive known as Operation Merlyn. Koevoet's key role in containing the initial PLAN advance had the effect of persuading many South African officials that it was the only force capable of keeping the peace in Ovamboland during the political transition. Louis Pienaar, the territory's Administrator-General, refused to withdraw Koevoet from Ovamboland after Operation Merlyn was concluded. According to Pienaar, UNTAG's failure to stop the incursion demonstrated it was impotent to ensure PLAN maintained the ceasefire. Koevoet was needed to prevent further infiltration attempts by insurgents in the future. Lieutenant General Dolf Gouws, commissioner of SWAPOL, also released statements in which he declared that "if Koevoet were removed, the way would be open to lawless government". As a compromise, the UN permitted Koevoet to continue operating in Ovamboland, albeit in an ostensibly civil role; operators were prohibited from carrying any weapons other than handguns and were restricted to the mundane duties of maintaining public order. In practice, Koevoet disregarded the UN's directives and continued carrying out counter-insurgency patrols with automatic weapons. The fact that the individual operators were allowed to keep their personal weapons at home made efforts to disarm them largely impractical.

=== Disbandment ===
Koevoet's continued presence in Ovamboland became a matter of serious contention as UNTAG began supervising the return of Namibian refugees to participate in the territory's upcoming elections, many of whom were SWAPO supporters. Koevoet operators, who continued to perceive SWAPO as their enemy, responded by breaking up political rallies held by the returnees. Within a few weeks of its deployment, UNTAG had received over fifty formal complaints from Ovamboland residents, alleging misconduct on the part of the security forces and Koevoet in particular. Koevoet was accused of assaulting SWAPO supporters and firing into crowds at rallies with live ammunition. Namibian refugees being repatriated from Angola were intimidated by Koevoet's presence due to its controversial reputation among exiles in general and SWAPO supporters in particular.

On 3 April, de Cuéllar had notified the UN Security Council that Koevoet had been reactivated. The decision to remobilise Koevoet, while not in accord with the agreements which the belligerent parties and the UN had concluded, was credited with defusing a potential crisis. Nevertheless, the Security Council demanded that South Africa disband Koevoet permanently. Pienaar refused to do so, citing the April incursion. De Cuéllar approached SWAPO officials and insisted they refrain from undertaking further military operations, which South Africa could use as a pretext to justify the continued deployment of Koevoet. He also flew to Pretoria to meet with Pik Botha and South African Minister of Law and Order Adriaan Vlok. During the meeting, the South African officials offered to take steps towards demobilising Koevoet in exchange for UNTAG sharing intelligence it possessed on PLAN movements and activities, as well as taking steps to demobilise PLAN. De Cuéllar agreed to work with the Angolan government and SWAPO president Sam Nujoma to ensure PLAN was properly demobilised.

In late April, UNTAG again lifted all restrictions confining the SADF to its bases, allowing the security forces to remove arms caches from Ovamboland and verify the absence of any remaining insurgents. By the end of May, nearly all the PLAN insurgents were accounted for, and were confined to their bases in Angola above the 16th parallel south under close UNTAG and UNHCR supervision. Likewise, the SADF returned to its bases. UNTAG systematically disarmed the insurgents and repatriated them to Namibia as civilian refugees without differentiating between members of PLAN and SWAPO's political wing. In all, 43,400 SWAPO members were repatriated to Namibia, at least 32,000 of whom were former insurgents.

SWAPOL responded to these overtures by reducing the size of Koevoet to about 1,600 personnel; the remaining operators were reassigned to other divisions. Prior to September 1989 between 1,200 and 2,000 Koevoet operators received new assignments and postings within SWAPOL. UNTAG continued receiving complaints of violence and political intimidation being committed by ex-Koevoet elements in the civil police. UNTAG had initially included a small civil police contingent of 500, but this was increased to 1,000 in May 1989 and subsequently to 1,500 by September. The UNTAG police contingent, known as CIVPOL, was tasked with monitoring SWAPOL's activities and discouraging the further integration of Koevoet operators with the civil police. As part of its mandate, CIVPOL performed joint patrols with Koevoet and other SWAPOL units. This proved nearly impossible because Ovamboland was still inundated with land mines planted by PLAN insurgents and CIVPOL lacked mine-protected vehicles like the Koevoet Casspirs. The CIVPOL vehicles also possessed inferior off-road performance compared to the Casspirs and would often be left behind during the joint patrols. UNTAG initially rejected CIVPOL's requests for its own Casspirs due to the claims touted by PLAN that these vehicles were associated with repression of the Namibian people. This reasoning was later abandoned due to the practical difficulties of the joint patrols, and CIVPOL was finally permitted to acquire several Casspirs from South Africa. Acts of political intimidation witnessed by CIVPOL monitors could be reported to their local headquarters, which in turn lodged complaints with the local SWAPOL precinct.

On 16 August, South Africa's acting state president F.W. de Klerk ordered Koevoet confined to its bases, and the unit effectively ceased operations. Almost two weeks later, United Nations Security Council Resolution 640 was passed, condemning Koevoet for its apparent "intimidation and harassment of the civilian population" and calling for its immediate disbandment, as well as the dismantling of its command structure. In late September, the South African government demobilised 1,200 Koevoet operators. The remaining 400 operators continued to remain on standby until 31 October, when the unit was formally disbanded. SWAPOL also took steps to demobilise ex-Koevoet operators integrated into the civil police, but this proved to be a more gradual process.

=== Postwar status ===
Due to concerns that unemployed and poorly educated Koevoet veterans would use their paramilitary skills for criminal purposes, the South African government announced it would permit any discharged member of Koevoet to continue drawing pay indefinitely until Namibian independence. Koevoet officers benefited from a pension fund and pension payment system established for them some years prior to independence. Their pensions were paid by the South African government until 1990, after which the Namibian government assumed responsibility for the pension system. No pension deductions were made from the schemes of constables or non-commissioned officers. The Namibian government also assumed responsibility for severance pay following independence; in 1990 each unemployed Koevoet veteran received lump sums ranging from $500 to $1,500 in Namibian currency. These benefits were only awarded to members of Koevoet who had served with the unit between 1988 and 1990; those with earlier service records were excluded. Most reintegration programmes devoted to Namibian veterans have explicitly excluded ex-Koevoet operators, who became the object of national stigma due to their service with such a controversial unit.

Following Namibian independence, all paramilitary elements of the Namibian police were consolidated into a new unit, the Special Field Force. Conventional counter-terrorism became the responsibility of the unrelated Special Reserve Force.

== Structure and organisation ==
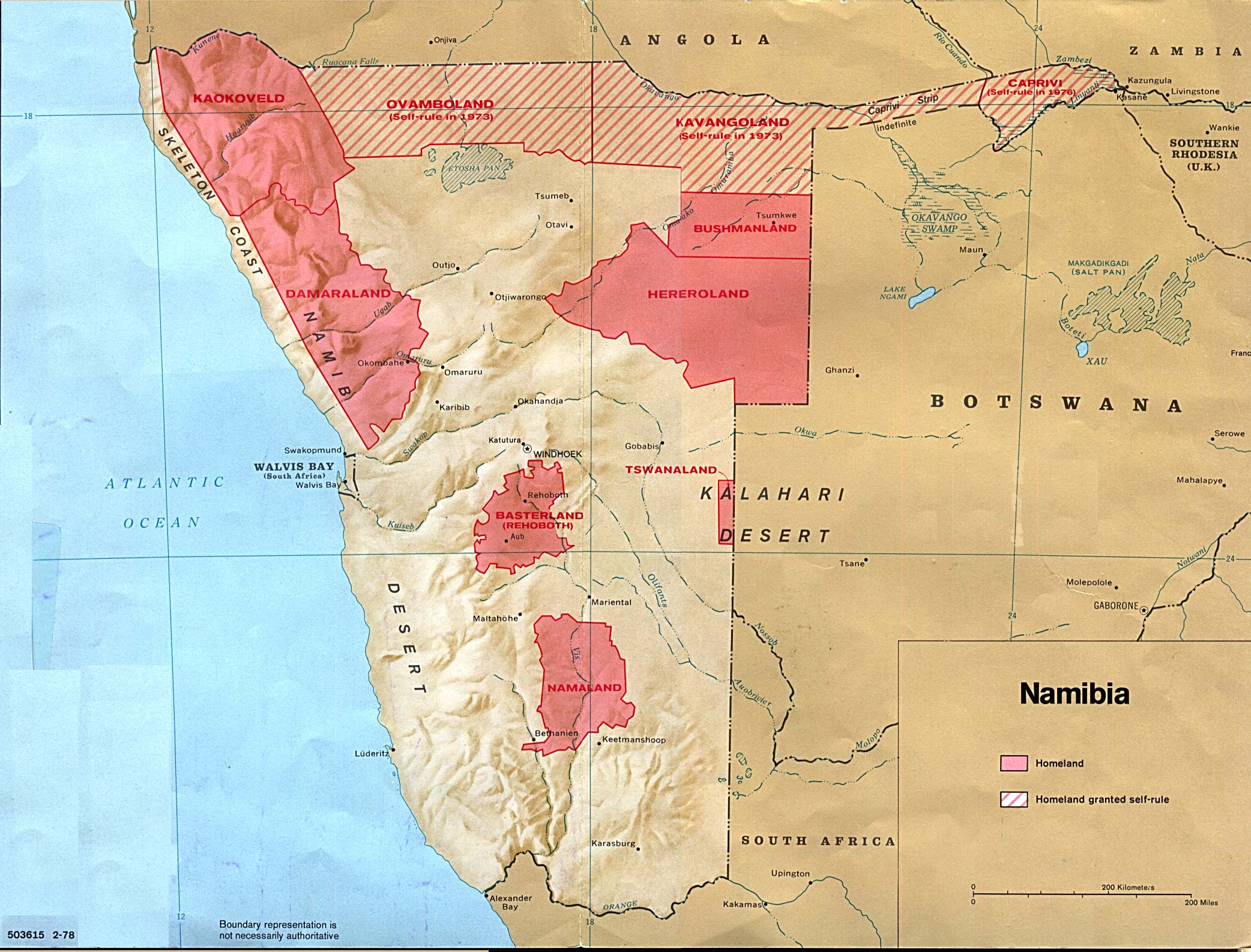
Map of Namibia, 1980s. Regions such as Kaokoland, Ovamboland, and Kavangoland were given theoretically self-governing status under South African law. In the northern part of the country, it was these areas where PLAN (and by extension, Koevoet) were most active.

Koevoet's jurisdiction spanned three regions in northern Namibia: Kaokoland, Ovamboland, and Kavangoland. Operations were coordinated by a single headquarters at Oshakati, with two smaller regional headquarters being established in Opuwo and Rundu. Basic training for Koevoet operators was carried out at a training school at Ondangwa, although more specialised instruction could later be provided in South Africa. Koevoet also operated a detention facility just north of Windhoek, where it interned captured PLAN insurgents. Temporary Koevoet encampments and bases were strung along the border, and in some cases the unit shared a partitioned base with the civil police or the SADF.

Koevoet was organised with a disproportionate emphasis on small unit tactics and most of its engagements were fought at the platoon or section level. The unit was structured into 24 platoon-sized fighting groups, which each received the prefix Zulu. The Zulu teams were designated alphabetically from A to Y and an individual team was identified by its letter's corresponding code in the NATO phonetic alphabet (i.e. Zulu Alpha). A team was usually composed of 40 black Ovambo constables and no more than 4 white officers. The team was led by a warrant officer and further divided into sections led by sergeants, which were capable of operating autonomously. While in the field, the sections were accompanied by a support element which handled logistics and intelligence. Each team had four Casspir mine-protected armoured vehicles, all of which carried ten passengers. Most of the Koevoet operators in a section remained mounted in the vehicles, but others proceeded ahead on foot and watched the ground for insurgent tracks. Operators were paid a bounty (known informally as a kopgeld) for every insurgent they killed or captured. Smaller bounties were also awarded for captured PLAN weapons, based on their condition and lethality. The bounty for a captured insurgent varied anywhere from 2,000 to 20,000 rand.

In 1985, Koevoet had about 1,000 personnel under arms. Between 700 and 800 of the Koevoet operators serving in 1985 were black Namibians drawn from the local population in Ovamboland. The remainder were black recruits from other regions and white officers, predominantly South Africans. Relatively few local whites were recruited into Koevoet because the SAP and later SWAPOL faced stiff competition from the military for suitable white Namibian officer candidates. A handful of white Rhodesian exiles were recruited as officers during the early 1980s as well as some Angolans of Ovambo origin who joined the enlisted ranks. Koevoet did not have dedicated operational medics, and all of those serving with the unit were from the South African Medical Service, a branch of the SADF.

By early 1989, Koevoet had almost tripled in size to about 3,000 personnel. Over the course of that year, it was reduced in size to about 1,600 personnel, a figure which remained more or less consistent between April and September 1989. Most of the Koevoet operators removed from the unit were given new assignments or demobilised. At the time of its disbandment in October 1989, Koevoet numbered only about 400 men.

== Uniforms and equipment ==
Each Koevoet fighting team adopted stylised shoulder patches and T-shirts depicting a mascot animal. Some of the patches also included an illustration of a broken insurgent AK-47 rifle. While on operations, Koevoet personnel dressed light and informally. Individual operators wore a wide variety of uniforms with little consistency, including SAP camouflage, SWAPOL camouflage, and brown SADF fatigues. Late in the war, Koevoet adopted an olive green uniform and green canvas boots to distinguish itself from other police units and the SADF.

Like the insurgents, Koevoet operators carried their ammunition in chest webbing rigs; this load-carrying tactic was favoured as it was less likely to restrict movement when moving through thick vegetation. The standard issue weapon in the unit was the Vektor R4 and Vektor R5 rifles, although some operators also carried captured PLAN Kalashnikov-pattern rifles. Koevoet sections were also issued support weapons during operations, namely the FN MAG general-purpose machine gun and the M79 grenade launcher. A few sections had access to Milkor MGLs or captured PLAN RPG-7s.

Koevoet initially possessed no vehicles aside from three Hippo armoured personnel carriers, which were designed to be blastproof and mine-resistant. As Koevoet was accustomed to fighting on foot, there was a distinct lack of enthusiasm for vehicle-borne operations. However, in time the unit's leadership opted to modify the Hippos essentially as infantry fighting vehicles and integrate them into Koevoet teams to increase their mobility. Koevoet Hippos were open-topped, as the hull roofs made the vehicles too hot for the extreme temperatures in Ovamboland and degraded situational awareness. Interior water tanks were also fitted, as well as additional rifle racks and turrets for heavy weapons. The Hippos were initially mounted with general-purpose machine guns, such as FN MAGs, captured PLAN PKMs, and Browning M1919s. In time, some were fitted with ZPU-2 anti-aircraft guns and even a French variant of the 20mm MG 151 cannon.

After 1980, the Casspir replaced the Hippo in Koevoet service, and weapon mounts became more standardised. Most Koevoet Casspirs were armed with a .50 calibre Browning M2 heavy machine gun on the hull roof, directly behind the driver's compartment. Ten Casspirs were fitted with 20mm cannon in lieu of the heavy machine gun, and a few section commanders replaced the single Browning with a twin mount for two general-purpose machine guns. It was not uncommon for Casspirs, like the Hippos, to be armed with M1919s or captured PKMs as auxiliary support weapons. Very late in the war, the Casspir was complemented in Koevoet service by the WMF Wolf Turbo, a similar vehicle optimised for Namibian conditions. Some Casspirs and Wolf Turbos were equipped with a mount for a 60mm mortar on the hull roof; this was used for suppressing ambushes.

== Tactics ==
Koevoet's tactics were shaped in response to PLAN efforts to create insecurity in South West Africa's northern districts. An integral part of PLAN's strategy was to organise insurgent cells in the region, which could effectively harass the security forces and politically indoctrinate the population to undermine the South African administration and later, the South African-sponsored government of national unity. The emphasis on politicisation by PLAN insurgents was the result of their training in the Soviet Union and other socialist states, which was not confined to tactical instruction but extended to the procedures for establishing a covert political-military infrastructure within enemy-held areas. Aside from political activities, PLAN sabotaged rural infrastructure, namely power lines. The insurgents also laid land mines along known military patrol routes to hinder South African convoys.

Koevoet's response was twofold: firstly, the unit carried out patrols to intercept PLAN insurgents near the Namibian border before they could get any further into the country itself. Secondly, it carried out what were essentially counter-intelligence operations aimed at compiling intelligence about PLAN activities while breaking up that movement's own intelligence network.

Half of Koevoet's manpower was on patrol at any given time. The unit's headquarters at Oshakati identified areas where the likelihood of a PLAN presence was the greatest, and dispatched teams to patrol these districts in search of the insurgents. Koevoet operators obtained their intelligence by observing suspicious tracks or interrogating the local population. Each patrol lasted between one and two weeks. The teams either spent the night in SADF and police camps or slept in the bush. It was standard procedure to circle villages in the area and study the tracks to determine if there were any recent signs of unusual activity. After the patrol was over, the team spent a week resting, retraining, and maintaining its equipment in base while another was dispatched to take its place.

Telltale cues in the environment indicating suspicious activity, including tracks and other signs, were known as spoor, an Afrikaans hunting term. Koevoet trackers were trained to scrutinise their environment down to the smallest detail, such as observing where dust had been disturbed on fallen leaves. The trackers walked or ran ahead of the remainder of the team, which followed in the vehicles, a tactic which Koevoet adopted in 1980. Occasionally Koevoet would be able to plot the insurgents' route after following their tracks; a section would then be dispatched ahead in an attempt to cut them off or intimidate them by firing its weapons. The purpose of this tactic was to sow panic among the insurgents, who would leave more obvious tracks and discard equipment as they attempted to outdistance their pursuers. If the spoor was lost, the trackers would be joined by others who dismounted from the vehicles and walked in a staggered line while they attempted to recover the spoor. The trackers frequently shouted clues and instructions to each other as they advanced. When they became exhausted, they were permitted to ride in the vehicles, and a fresh detachment of trackers dismounted to take their place. It was not uncommon for spoor to be followed for days on end. The longest distance a Koevoet team followed a single spoor without interruption was 185 kilometres.

In many cases, the insurgents would attempt to ambush the team if they became aware of the pursuit. Koevoet trackers were usually able to discern that an ambush was imminent by studying the growing concentration of tracks, and in this event the team would circle the suspected ambush area in its vehicles, laying down suppressive fire. On other occasions, they would attempt to suppress the suspected ambush with mortars.

Koevoet's counter-intelligence activities were equally effective, largely because the unit was more in contact with the civilian population at the local grassroots level, and unlike the intelligence organs of the SADF, was organised specifically with unconventional (i.e. counter-insurgency) warfare in mind. Koevoet was able to wage a successful irregular campaign against PLAN using "pseudo guerrillas", operators attired in PLAN uniforms who carried captured Soviet weapons. This helped sow suspicion in the ranks of the real insurgents and leave their informants uncertain as to whether any insurgent was a real PLAN fighter; it thus undermined PLAN's capacity to conduct politicisation programmes within local communities. The "pseudo guerrilla" programme was a closely guarded secret until Koevoet was compelled by the Namibian courts to disclose some details during the trial of Jonas Paulus in 1983.

== Allegations of war crimes ==
While Koevoet had an exceptional combat record in Namibia—during the final decade of the war it killed a little over 2,800 insurgents and captured another 463 while suffering 151 casualties—it also cultivated a reputation for being particularly brutal and ruthless, as well as being indifferent towards the SADF's rules of engagement.

Over the course of the South African Border War, PLAN accused Koevoet of committing numerous human rights violations, especially extrajudicial killings and assassinations. Koevoet was accused of mistreating detainees and prisoners, subjecting them to various forms of torture, including physical assault, electric shocks, and sleep, food, and water deprivation. The unit operated its own detention facility, which was not subject to oversight by the civil authorities and where prisoners could be detained indefinitely. The detainees included captured insurgents as well as any civilian suspected of possessing vital information related to PLAN activities. In 1986, the Namibian courts ruled that as all the Koevoet's detainees had been arrested by a police unit as common law criminals, they were entitled to legal representation within a period of thirty days. Koevoet later subverted this ruling by evoking the Terrorism Act.

Two especially contentious issues which emerged with regards to Koevoet was the common practice of displaying corpses of dead insurgents on the unit's Casspirs, and the use of "pseudo-guerrilla" forces. During the early 1980s, SWAPOL and the SADF issued vehement denials that the enemy dead were being publicly exhibited, and warned that members of the security forces who indulged in such behaviour would be prosecuted. In December 1986, photographs were leaked to the international press which displayed two dead insurgents draped over the hull of a Koevoet Casspir. Koevoet claimed that the insurgents were not being exhibited, but simply being carried back to base, presumably for the purpose of claiming kopgeld, stating that it was impractical to store the corpses inside the Casspirs due to the vehicles' limited internal stowage space.

PLAN insisted that Koevoet's "pseudo-guerrilla" forces were being used to carry out atrocities later attributed to insurgents. The most controversial incident allegedly involving "pseudo-guerrillas" was the murder of a family of 8 Ovambo civilians at Oshipanda. The civilians were shot with Kalashnikov rifles, and their home ransacked for valuables. A man who escaped the massacre claimed to have recognised a Koevoet constable among the assailants. Koevoet and the civil police blamed PLAN for the killings.

Perceptions of Koevoet's human rights record among the SADF's general staff were almost universally critical. General Constand Viljoen, who served as Chief of the SADF between 1980 and 1985, claimed that Koevoet operators "had a cruelty about them that certainly didn't further the hearts and minds of the people....they used cruel, cruel, methods". His successor, General Johannes Geldenhuys, was no less scathing: "[Koevoet] would, for example, go into an area, clean it up, then collect the bodies and drag them through town behind their vehicles. Obviously this kind of action upset the local population greatly and we'd find we were suddenly getting no more cooperation from the locals". General Georg Meiring, who served as chief of the South West African Territorial Force between 1983 and 1987, stated that "Koevoet was not a law unto itself, Koevoet was just unto itself...I hated working with them."

In 1996, the Truth and Reconciliation Commission was established to investigate human rights abuses committed in South Africa and Namibia under the apartheid system. The commission suggested that Koevoet carried out the Oshipanda murders, based on the account of the surviving eyewitness. It was favourably inclined towards PLAN's claims that Koevoet operators carried out atrocities during "pseudo-guerrilla" operations to discredit the insurgent cause. The commission found that rape by Koevoet operators "was common, and women and girls of all ages were victims". It held Koevoet responsible for the summary execution of captured PLAN insurgents, including those who were wounded or otherwise incapacitated, and for the maltreatment of detainees at its internment facility.

== See also ==
- Eugene de Kock, notable former Koevoet operator
- Selous Scouts
- 32 Battalion
- Flechas
- Senoi Praaq
