= United Nations Security Council Resolution 532 =

UN Security Council Resolution 532
- Namibia
- Date: 31 May 1983
- Meeting no.: 2,449
- Code: S/RES/532 (Document)
- Subject: Namibia
- Voting summary: 14 voted for; None voted against; 1 abstained
- Result: Adopted

Security Council composition
- Permanent members: China; France; Soviet Union; United Kingdom; United States
- Non-permanent members: Guyana; Jordan; Malta; Netherlands; Nicaragua; Pakistan; Poland; Togo; Zaire; Zimbabwe

United Nations Security Council resolution 532, adopted almost unanimously on 31 May 1983, after hearing a report from the Secretary-General and reaffirming resolutions 301 (1971), 385 (1976), 431 (1978), 432 (1978), 435 (1978) and 439 (1978), the Council condemned South Africa's continued occupation of Namibia, then known as South West Africa. All voted in favour other than France, who abstained.

The resolution called upon South Africa to make firm commitments for the independence of Namibia, including the provisions of free and fair elections, under Resolution 435. It also called on the Secretary-General to report on the results of the consultations no later than 31 August 1983.

== See also ==
- List of United Nations Security Council Resolutions 501 to 600 (1982–1987)
- Namibian War of Independence
- South African Border Wars
- Apartheid
