= Western Contact Group =

Joint diplomatic group

The Western Contact Group (WCG), representing three of the five permanent members of the UN Security Council - France, United Kingdom and United States - and including Canada and West Germany, launched a joint diplomatic effort in 1977 to bring an internationally acceptable transition to independence for Namibia, after a decade of illegal occupation by apartheid of South Africa.

== International diplomacy ==
The Western Contact Group's efforts led to the presentation in 1978 of United Nations Security Council Resolution 435 for resolving the Namibian problem. The Settlement Proposal, as it became known, was worked out after lengthy consultations by the WCG with South Africa, the front-line states (Angola, Botswana, Mozambique, Tanzania, Zambia, and Zimbabwe), together with SWAPO and the then UN Commissioner for Namibia, Martti Ahtisaari. It called for the holding of elections in Namibia under UN supervision and control, the cessation of all hostile acts by all parties, and restrictions on the activities of South African and Namibian military, paramilitary, and police.

Although South Africa had agreed to cooperate in achieving the implementation of Resolution 435, it unilaterally held elections in Namibia which were boycotted by SWAPO and a few other political parties. South Africa continued to administer Namibia through its installed multiracial coalitions and an appointed Administrator-General. Negotiations after 1978 focused on issues such as supervision of elections connected with the implementation of the settlement proposal.

The Western Contact Group was the first International Contact Group and an example for later ad-hoc formed informal forms of diplomatic crisis management.

== Conditional agreement ==
Another decade passed until South Africa signed the New York Accords agreeing to grant independence to Namibia, but on condition that Cuban troops were withdrawn from neighbouring Angola and that Soviet military aid to Angola should cease.

Namibia finally achieved its independence on March 21, 1990.

== See also ==
- History of Namibia
