= List of colonial governors of Walvis Bay =

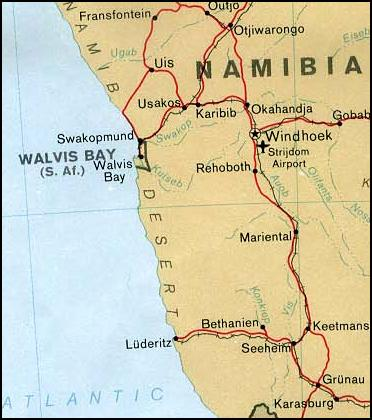
Walvis Bay on a 1978 map, and reference to South Africa before the handover to Namibia.

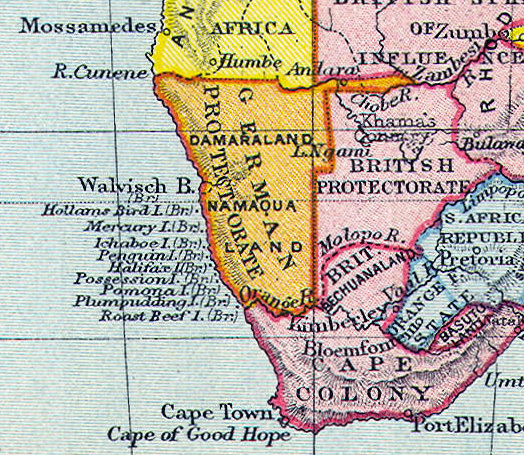
The Penguin Islands on an extract from a 1897 map of colonial Southern Africa.

This article lists the colonial governors of Walvis Bay, a city in the modern day Republic of Namibia (currently the third largest city in the country). The list encompass the period from 1878 to 1994, when Walvis Bay and the surrounding territory (including the Penguin Islands) was controlled by the United Kingdom and later by South Africa.

The list also encompasses the period of joint Namibian-South African control of Walvis Bay, from 1993 to 1994.

The title of the position changed a number of times. Under British rule, the title of the position went from Captain (1878) to Resident Magistrate (1878–1883) to Magistrate (1883–1910). Under South African rule, the title was Magistrate (1910–1925), Magistrate and Chairman of Village Management Board (1925–1931) and Mayor (1931–1994). Under joint Namibian-South African rule, the title was Chief Executive Officer of Joint Administrative Authority (1993–1994).

== List ==
(Dates in italics indicate de facto continuation of office)

Tenure	Portrait	Incumbent	Notes
British Suzerainty
Walvis Bay annexed by the United Kingdom (annexation confirmed on 14 December 1878)
12 March 1878 to 1878		Richard C. Dyer, Captain	
1 June 1878 to 1880		D. Erskine, Resident Magistrate	
1879 to January 1880		W. E. Manning, acting Resident Magistrate	acting for Erskine
1880 to November 1880		William Coates Palgrave, Resident Magistrate	
November 1880 to 1882		Benjamin d'Urban Musgrave, Resident Magistrate	
August 1882 to 13 June 1883		E. J. Whindus, Resident Magistrate	
13 June 1883 to 7 August 1884		J. S. Simpson, Magistrate	
Incorporated into Cape Colony
7 August 1884 to 1885?		J. S. Simpson, Magistrate	
1885 to 1889		Emile S. Rolland, Magistrate	
1889 to 1901		John James Cleverly, Magistrate	1st time, acting to July 1890
1902 to 1903		Frank H. Guthrie, Magistrate	
1903 to August 1905		John James Cleverly, Magistrate	2nd time
August 1905 to 1909?		David Eadie, Magistrate	
1909 to 31 May 1910		J. M. Richards, Magistrate	
South African Suzerainty
Part of Cape Province within Union of South Africa
31 May 1910 to 1915?		J. M. Richards, Magistrate	
1915 to 1920		Frederic Wodehouse Bult, Military Magistrate for Swakopmund	
1920 to 1 October 1922		K. R. Thomas, Magistrate for Swakopmund and Walvis	
Administration assigned to South West Africa
1 October 1922 to 18 March 1925		K. R. Thomas, Magistrate for Swakopmund and Walvis	
18 March 1925 to 16 March 1931		K. R. Thomas, Magistrate and Chairman of Village Management Board	
Municipal status
16 March 1931 to 1932		S. Blyth, Mayor	
1932 to 1934		W. G. Neate, Mayor	
1934 to 1940		Thomas Perris Hall, Mayor	
1940		E. O. Bull, Mayor	
12 December 1940 to 15 April 1948	Municipal status suspended (under magistrates for Swakopmund)		
29 April 1948 to 12 September 1949		J. Christie, Mayor	
23 September 1949 to 12 September 1950		F. Davel, Mayor	
13 September 1950 to 6 September 1951		Joseph C. Harries, Mayor	1st time
7 September 1951 to 8 February 1952		A. C. Stafford, Mayor	
9 February 1952 to 16 September 1953		W. J. Hamilton, Mayor	
17 September 1953 to 31 August 1954		Joseph C. Harries, Mayor	2nd time
31 August 1954 to 21 March 1955		H. St. John Reid, Mayor	
22 March 1955 to 31 May 1955		W. A. Bester, Mayor	
14 September 1955 to 27 August 1958		William Austin Willis, Mayor	1st time
27 August 1958 to 1960?		Peter van Aarde, Mayor	
1960? to 1963?		William Austin Willis, Mayor	2nd time
4 July 1963 to 11 March 1970		M. C. Botma, Mayor	
16 March 1970 to 14 March 1974		Heleon "Leon" Hendrikus Laubscher, Mayor	1st time
14 March 1974 to 12 March 1975		Nelis Naudé Dreyer, Mayor	
14 March 1975 to 10 March 1977		Heleon "Leon" Hendrikus Laubscher, Mayor	2nd time
11 March 1977 to 1 September 1977		Nico Retief, Mayor	1st time
Re-integrated into Cape Province (within South Africa)
1 September 1977 to 16 March 1978		Nico Retief, Mayor	1st time; on 4 November 1977, South African claim to Walvis Bay and the Penguin Islands declared "null and void" and are named "integral parts of Namibia" by the United Nations (formally 28 July 1978, by United Nations Security Council (UNSC) Resolution 432)
17 March 1978 to 28 March 1980		A. Prinsloo, Mayor	
28 March 1980 to 27 March 198?		Hester E. M. Deissler, Mayor	1st time
28 March 198? to 17 March 1983		Nico Retief, Mayor	2nd time
18 March 1983 to 1 November 1988		Christoffel L. de Jager, Mayor	
2 November 1988 to 6 December 1989		Hester E. M. Deissler, Mayor	2nd time
7 December 1989 to 4 October 1991		Nico Retief, Mayor	3rd time
25 October 1991 to 29 October 1992		Ronald Noel "Buddy" Bramwell, Mayor	
30 October 1992 to 8 November 1993		Jacobus N. "Koot" Blaauw, Mayor	
9 November 1993 to 22 August 1994		Bryce Gerard Edwards, Mayor	
Joint Administrative Authority (in Pretoria)
15 January 1993 to 28 February 1994	Under joint Namibian-South African administration		
15 January 1993 to 28 February 1994		Nangolo Mbumba, Chief Executive Officer	Representing Namibia
15 January 1993 to 28 February 1994		Carl von Hirschberg, Chief Executive Officer	Representing South Africa
1 March 1994	Walvis Bay exclave ceded to Republic of Namibia by South Africa		

== See also ==
- Walvis Bay
- Penguin Islands
- South West Africa
  - List of colonial governors of South West Africa
- History of Namibia
- Politics of Namibia
