= Marthinus T. Steyn =

Marthinus T. Steyn may refer to:

- Marthinus Theunis Steyn (1857–1916), a South African lawyer, politician, and statesman
- Marthinus T. Steyn, Administrator-General of South West Africa (1977–1979)
