= Settlement Proposal =

1978 UN proposal for Namibian independence

The 1978 Settlement Proposal in Namibia, devised by the Contact Group of Western States, mandated the United Nations Transition Assistance Group (UNTAG) under United Nations Security Council Resolution 435 to assist a UN Special Representative appointed by the UN Secretary-General 'to ensure the early independence of Namibia through free and fair elections under the supervision and control of the United Nations'.

== Background ==
In 1978, the United Nations Security Council agreed to the basic principle of a UN-assisted Namibian independence process. But disputes remained over which group would determine Namibia's independence. Internationally, the division over Namibia was between, on the one hand, South Africa, Namibia's 'internal parties', the Western Contact Group (WCG), and on the other, SWAPO, the United Nations General Assembly, the Non-Aligned States in the Security Council, and the Frontline States (Tanzania, Zambia, Angola, Mozambique, Botswana, Zimbabwe - since its independence in 1980 - and Nigeria).

The UN Secretariat's UNTAG mission was supposed to be impartial even though both South Africa and SWAPO accused UNTAG of favouring the other side. (The General Assembly supported SWAPO financially for many years, including the construction of the United Nations Institute for Namibia in Zambia, which was set up to train Namibian exiles and refugees.

== Basic framework ==
The Western Contact Group brought South Africa to the negotiating table and drafted three 1978 documents which created the basic framework of UNTAG's peace implementation mandate:

1. WCG's Settlement Proposal S/12636 of 10 April 1978;
2. UN Secretary-General's report of 29 August 1978 (S/12827);
3. United Nations Security Council Resolution 435 (S/RES/435).

The Settlement Proposal called for free and fair elections to pave the way for a transition to Namibian independence. The proposal included the mandate for the Secretary-General to appoint a Special Representative, who 'will have to satisfy himself at each stage as to the fairness and appropriateness of all measures affecting the political process at all levels of administration before such measures take effect. Moreover, the Special Representative may himself make proposals in regard to any aspect of the political process.' This resolution placed the Special Representative at the heart of all decision making. Finnish diplomat, Martti Ahtisaari, was chosen for the position in 1978, after his appointment as UN Commissioner for Namibia in 1977.

The Settlement Proposal included a very specific timetable for the implementation of the elections with certain tasks which the UN, South African government and SWAPO had to fulfil. The elections would create an independent Namibian 'Constituent Assembly' which would draw up a constitution immediately upon its election and then govern in a 'National Assembly'.

A number of uncertainties were resolved in the UNS-G's report (S/12827) including uniting the civilian and military components of UNTAG under one Special Representative. But many issues were unresolved.

== Ten years later ==
The unresolved issues, while potentially hindering the operation, actually helped the Special Representative to define the mission based on the realities of 1988 - when the operation began - rather than 1978, when the accord was initially drafted. UN Commissioner for Namibia, Bernt Carlsson, should have become the Special Representative upon signature of the New York Accords on 22 December 1988 but was killed in the Lockerbie bombing of 21 December 1988.

Former UN Commissioner Martti Ahtisaari, who helped draw up the original Settlement Proposal, was therefore recalled from an administrative position at UN Headquarters to serve as Special Representative so as 'to ensure the early independence of Namibia through free and fair elections under the supervision and control of the United Nations'.

== Independence ==
Free elections in Namibia were held in November 1989 with SWAPO taking 57% of the vote in spite of Pretoria’s attempts to swing it in favour of other parties. By 9 February 1990, the Constituent Assembly had drafted and adopted a constitution. Independence Day on 21 March 1990 was attended by numerous international representatives, including the main players, the UN Secretary-General Javier Pérez de Cuéllar and President of South Africa F. W. de Klerk, who jointly conferred formal independence on Namibia.

Sam Nujoma was sworn in as the first President of Namibia watched by Nelson Mandela (who had been released from prison shortly beforehand) and representatives from 147 countries, including 20 heads of state.
