= Beves =

Beves is a surname. Notable people with the surname include:

- Donald Beves (1896–1961), English academic
- Gordon Beves (1862–1927), South African cricket umpire
- Percival Scott Beves (1863 or 1868–1924), British and South African military officer
