= Willie van Niekerk =

South African politician (1937–2009)

Willem Abraham van Niekerk M.B. Ch.B., MRCOG, FCOG (CMSA), M.D., FRCOG, F.I.A.C

Minister of Health
- In office 1985–1989
- President: PW Botha
- Preceded by: Cornelis van der Merwe
- Succeeded by: Rina Venter

Administrator-General of South West Africa
- In office 1 February 1983 – 1 July 1985
- Preceded by: Danie Hough
- Succeeded by: Louis Pienaar

Personal details
- Born: Willem Abraham van Niekerk; 29 June 1937
- Died: 3 August 2009 (aged 72)
- Party: National Party
- Occupation: Medical Doctor

Willem (Willie) Abraham van Niekerk (29 June 1937 in Pretoria – 8 August 2009) was a South African physician, professor, and politician. Van Niekerk was Minister of Health in the government of P. W. Botha from 1985 to 1989 and Administrator-General of South West Africa from 1983 to 1985. He specialized in cytogenetics, cell biology, gynecology, and obstetrics.

== Biography ==
Van Niekerk was born in Pretoria and grew up on the family farm located in the Orange Free State. He studied medicine and surgery at the University of Pretoria, and graduated in 1959. He worked as a researcher for the Roswell Park Memorial Cancer Institute in Buffalo, New York, United States, before returning to South Africa in 1960 where he worked at the Department of Obstetrics and Gynecology at the University of Pretoria.

In 1965, he became a member of the Royal College of Obstetricians and Gynaecologists (MRCOG) in London. Van Niekerk became a Fellow of the College of Obstetricians and Gynaecologists (FRCOG) in 1971. In 1969, he was appointed a lecturer/consultant at the University of Pretoria where he taught. In 1970, he moved to the University of Stellenbosch where he was given a full professorship and made Head of the Department of Obstetrics and Gynaecology.

Van Niekerk left the University of Stellenbosch in 1982 to enter politics. He renounced his presidency of the International Academy of Cytology in 1983, and was appointed administrator of South-West Africa. He was appointed Minister of Health and Population Development in the Cabinet of P. W. Botha from 1985 to 1989 and served on the President's Council from 1989.

In 1992, as the National Party began to lose their grip on power, Van Niekerk left politics to return to the private sector as a Gynaecologist in the suburbs of Cape Town. He retired in 2004.

Van Niekerk is the author of over 27 publications on cytology, cytogenetics, gynaecology and obstetrics, gynaecological pathologies. He was the first to describe the cytological appearance of cervical cells in folate deficiency, which had certain similarities with pre-neoplastic changes (Nel, JT). His doctoral thesis on hermaphroditism, published in 1972, is considered the authoritative work on the subject. He became an honorary member of the combination of the American Association of Obstetricians and Gynecologists and the American Gynecological Society in 1981.
