= Percival Scott Beves =

British and South African military officer

Brigadier-General Percival Scott Beves CB CMG
- Born: 1863 or 1868
- Died: 26 September 1924 (aged 61 or 56)
- Military career
- Allegiance: United Kingdom; South Africa
- Branch: British Army (Union of South Africa) Union Defence Force
- Rank: Brigadier-General
- Conflicts: Second Boer War; World War I
- Other work: Military Governor of South West Africa (1915)

Brigadier-General Percival Scott Beves, CB, CMG ( March 1868 – 26 September 1924) was an officer of the British Army and the South African Defence Forces.

== Life ==
Beves went to The Leys School in Cambridge and joined the British Army in 1887. A year later he was already serving in India and Burma and shortly afterwards became an instructor at the Wargrave Military College in the United Kingdom. Here he taught military tactics, topography, engineering and military law until 1890.

He then took part in the Second Boer War until February 1900, including in the Battle of Ladysmith. From then on, Beves lived in the South African Republic.

During World War I, Beves was military governor of South West Africa, present-day Namibia, from 11 July 1915 to 30 October 1915. As a member of the South African military, the Union Defence Force (UDF), he played a key role in the campaign against German South West Africa through his landing in Lüderitz. In 1917 he went to German East Africa to take part in the campaign there.

Beves died in 1924 from complications resulting from a malaria infection he had contracted in East Africa.

== Honours ==
In 1916, Beves received the Order of Saint Stanislaus 2nd Class with Sword from the Russian Empire. In 1917, he became Companion of the Order of St Michael and St George (CMG) and a year later Companion of The Most Honorable Order of the Bath (CB). Beves was also a recipient of the Queen's South Africa Medal with 2 service clasps and the King's South Africa Medal with 2 service clasps.

== Bibliography ==
- Brock Katz, David (2022). General Jan Smuts and His First World War in Africa, 1914–1917 – Incorporating His German South West and East Africa Campaigns. Casemate Publishers. ISBN 978-1-63624-018-3.
- Cruise, Adam (2015). Louis Botha’s War – The Campaign in German South-West Africa, 1914–1915. Penguin Random House. ISBN 978-1-77022-753-8.
- The Colonial Official List, 1919. Great Britain Colonial Office, Princeton University, 1919 (available online)

Military offices
| Preceded by Louis Botha | Military Governor of South West Africa; 11 July 1915 – 30 October 1915 | Succeeded by Edmond Gorges as Administrator of South West Africa |
