= Onze Rust =

Coordinates: 29°16′30″S 26°11′00″E

Onze Rus was the farm owned by President Martinus Theunis Steyn, the last State President of the Orange Free State. It is located around 22 km south of Bloemfontein, South Africa. After the Second Boer War, he tended to operate from here as a leader and adviser to the Afrikaner people.

President Steyn's agteryer is buried at his farm in honor of him working for the President of the Oranje Vrystaat (or it is because he is the President's agteryer).There is also a school named after the President Steyn's farm(Onze Rust) in the capital city of the Freestate province (Bloemfontein).

== History ==
President Steyn bought the farm in 1896 and named it Onze Rust. During his presidency and the war, he did not live there, but after his return from Europe in 1905, he settled there.

After the war, President Steyn and his family traveled Europe to obtain treat his botulism. During their exile, Afrikaners decided to enlarge the farm. An encouraged Steyn invited out-of-work Free Staters to work on the building. No hard materials were used for construction. The walls were built with red, crude stone and long unplastered, and the woodwork was pine.

The new house, with its large porch where Steyn met with visiting dignitaries, was very spacious. Onze Rust became Steyn's headquarters and was open to the public. They received many visitors.

After Steyn's death in 1916, his widow continued to live in the house for thirty years.

== Contemporary appearance ==
Steyn's grandson, Justice MT Steyn, made several alterations - for instance shuttering windows for more light and purchasing furniture and utensils for Onze Rust.

The old homestead in the shade of the giant trees remains similar in appearance to what it was when President Steyn lived there, and the pomegranate and apricot trees planted by Steyn himself remain.

The walls are covered with family portraits and photographs of friends. The bathroom still features an old pink bath made specially for President Steyn after his illness; the bedrooms have four-poster canopy beds and antique lamps; and the Victorian lounge contains family heirlooms. In the kitchen is a shelf where many of Mrs. Rachel Isabella Steyn often laid cake tins and kitchen utensils.

The historic study is largely in line with its appearance in the President's time. The large old leather reading chair, or invalid chair, that the paralyzed president used, is still there.

A photo of First Lady Steyn hangs in a place of honor on the mantel. There are also photographs of the Free State President and other leaders, such as Gen. Koos de la Rey and Paul Kruger. Judge Steyn purposefully position the photo of Sarel Cilliers between those of Gens. J. B. M. Hertzog and Louis Botha "so that a man of God can keep the peace."

== Sources ==
- Internet Museum of Afrikaner History

== Bibliography ==
- NALN. 1989. "Onze Rust." In Afrikanerbakens, Auckland Park: Federasie van Afrikaanse Kultuurvereniginge, pp. 92–93.
