= Theunie Steyn =

South African judge

The Honourable Theunie Steyn SC

Judge of the Appellate Division
- In office 1988–1995

Administrator-General of South West Africa
- In office 1977–1978
- Preceded by: Barend Johannes van der Walt (Administrator)
- Succeeded by: Gerrit Viljoen

Judge of the Orange Free State Provincial Division of the Supreme Court of South Africa
- In office 1974–1988

Personal details
- Born: Marthinus Theunis Steyn; 5 November 1920 Bloemfontein, Orange Free State, Union of South Africa
- Died: 4 April 1998 (aged 77) Bloemfontein, South Africa
- Relations: MT Steyn (Grandfather)
- Parent: Colin Fraser Steyn (father)
- Education: University of Cape Town
- Profession: Advocate

Marthinus Theunis "Theunie" Steyn SC (5 November 1920 – 14 April 1998) was a South African judge of the Appellate Division and Administrator-General of South West Africa.

== Early life and education ==
Steyn was born on the farm "Onze Rust", which belonged to his grandfather, President MT Steyn, the last president of the Orange Free State, and then to his father, Colin Fraser Steyn, a former Minister of Justice of the Union of South Africa. In 1937, he matriculated at Grey College in Bloemfontein and then went to the University of Cape Town, where he obtained his BA degree in 1940 and his LLB in 1944. During 1944 to 1945, Steyn was a first lieutenant in the infantry of the 6th Armoured Division and fought in Italy during World War II.

== Career ==
On 5 February 1948, Steyn was admitted as an advocate of the High Court of South Africa and immediately began practising as an advocate at the Free State Bar. He became senior counsel in May 1965 and acted as judge of the division several times from 1968. He was permanently appointed judge of the Free State Provincial Division on 1 June 1974.

From September 1977 to August 1978, Steyn served as first Administrator-General of the then South West Africa. It is widely acknowledged that he did good work in preparing for the independence of SWA. In 1987 he was appointed acting appeal judge and on 14 January 1988 as permanent judge of appeal. He continued to serve as an appeal judge until he reached the age of 75.
