= Danie Hough =

South African politician

Daniel "Danie" Hough (1937–2008) was a South African politician who served as the Administrator-General of South West Africa from September 4, 1980 to February 1, 1983 and as the Administrator of the Transvaal Province from June 1, 1988 to May 7, 1994. Upon his arrival in South West Africa, he was greeted with a military parade through Windhoek, the capital city. His time in South West Africa was during the period where the United Nations had declared the South African control over Namibia as illegal, and was during the South African Border War versus SWAPO. From 1988 to 1994 he was the Administrator of Transvaal.
