= Edmond Gorges =

South African politician (1872–1924)

Sir Edmond Gorges KCMG

Administrator of South West Africa
- In office 31 October 1915 – 1 October 1920
- Preceded by: Percival Scott Beves (as Military Governor of South West Africa)
- Succeeded by: Gysbert Reitz Hofmeyr

Personal details
- Born: Edmond Howard Lacam Gorges; 16 January/11 February 1872 King William's Town, Cape Colony
- Died: 18 November 1924 (aged 52) Cape Town, Cape Province, Union of South Africa
- Spouse: Dora Faure
- Children: 2
- Occupation: Politician

Sir Edmond Howard Lacam Gorges, KCMG, rarely also written Edmund (16 January/11 February 1872 in King William's Town – 18 November 1924 in Cape Town) was a South African politician and Administrator of South West Africa, present-day Namibia.

Gorges became the first civilian South African administrator to assume responsibility for South West Africa on 31 October 1915. He held the office until 1 October 1920.

Gorges was married to Dora Faure, with whom he had two children.

He was Knight Commander of the Order of St Michael and St George. A Baobab ("Sir Howard") in the former Bantustan of Ovamboland is named after him, after Gorges was the first administrator to visit this part of the country in 1916.

Government offices
Preceded by Percival Scott Beves as Military Governor of South West Africa	Administrator of South West Africa; 31 October 1915 – 1 October 1920	Succeeded by Gysbert Reitz Hofmeyr
