= United Nations Security Council Resolution 439 =

UN Security Council Resolution 439
- Namibia
- Date: 13 November 1978
- Meeting no.: 2,098
- Code: S/RES/439 (Document)
- Subject: Namibia
- Voting summary: 10 voted for; None voted against; 5 abstained
- Result: Adopted

Security Council composition
- Permanent members: China; France; Soviet Union; United Kingdom; United States
- Non-permanent members: Bolivia; Canada; Czechoslovakia; Gabon; India; Kuwait; Mauritius; Nigeria; Venezuela; West Germany

United Nations Security Council Resolution 439, adopted on November 13, 1978, after recalling resolutions 385 (1976), 431 (1978), 432 (1978) and 435 (1978), the Council condemned South Africa for its decision to proceed unilaterally with elections in Namibia in contravention of previous resolutions. The Council considered this a clear defiance of the authority of the United Nations.

Resolution 439 continued by stating that the results of elections held in South West Africa will be declared null and void and will not be recognised by the United Nations or any of its Member States. The Council demanded that South Africa cooperate with it and if not, will consider further action under Chapter VII of the United Nations Charter so as to ensure South Africa's compliance with the Security Council. The resolution also required the Secretary-General to report on the progress of the implementation of the resolution by November 25, 1978.

The resolution passed with 10 votes to none, while Canada, France, West Germany, the United Kingdom and United States abstained from voting.

== See also ==
- List of United Nations Security Council Resolutions 401 to 500 (1971–1976)
- Namibian War of Independence
- South Africa under apartheid
