= South West African Police =

National police force in modern-day Namibia

South West African Police Suidwes-Afrikaanse Polisie Südwestafrikanische Polizei
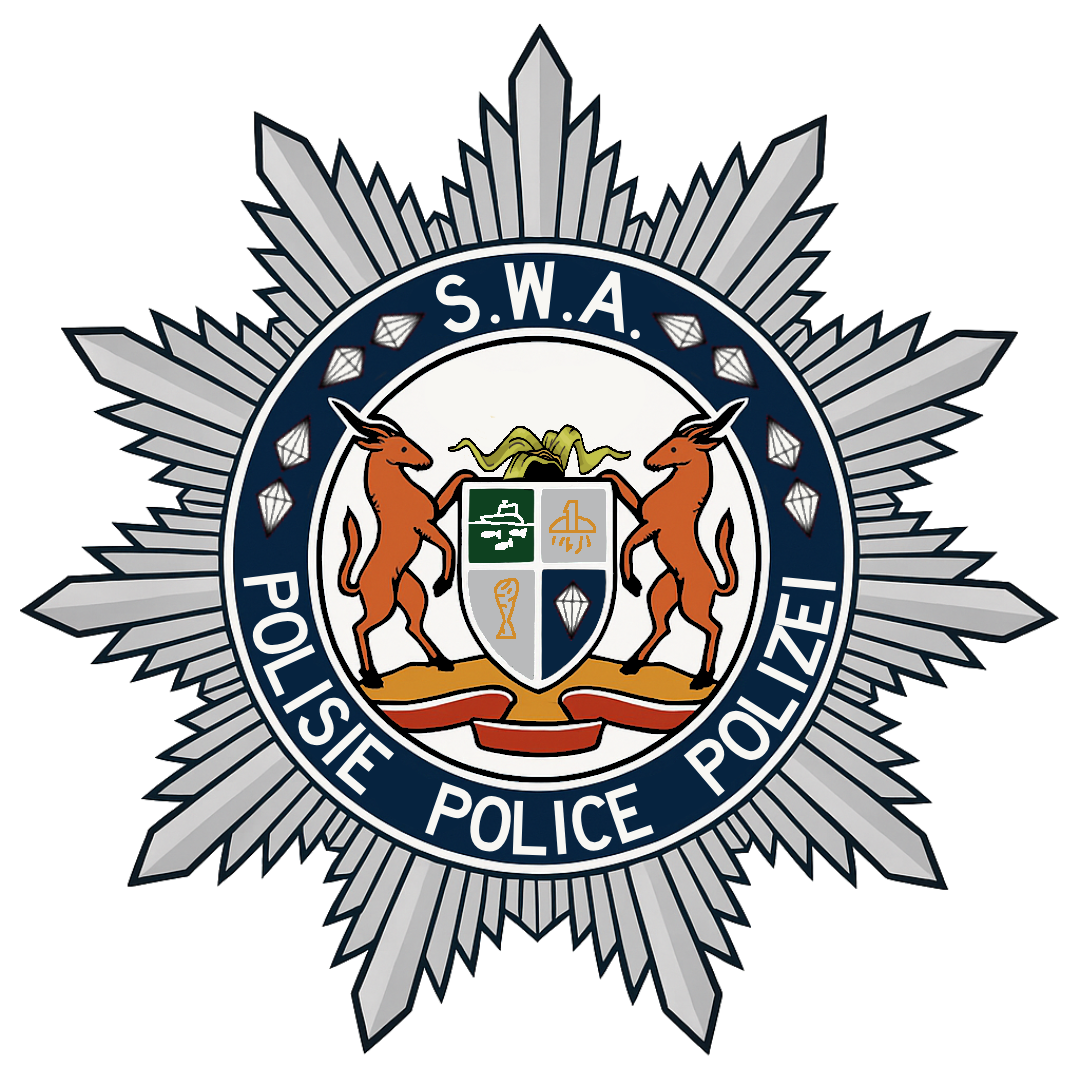
- Abbreviation: SWAPOL

Agency overview
- Formed: 1920
- Dissolved: 1990
- Superseding agency: Namibian Police Force
- Employees: 6,500 (1989)

Jurisdictional structure
- National agency: South West Africa
- Operations jurisdiction: South West Africa
- Map of the South West African Police’s jurisdiction
- Area: 825,615 km^{2} (318,772 sq mi)
- Population: 2 million
- General nature: Gendarmerie; Local civilian police

The South West African Police (SWAPOL) was the national police force of South West Africa (now Namibia), responsible for law enforcement and public safety in South West Africa when the territory was administered by South Africa. It was organised and structured both as a paramilitary force and as a civil police force.

== History ==
Before World War I, then colonial authorities in German South West Africa maintained a small gendarmerie-styled police force. When the South African government assumed administration of South West Africa under the terms of a League of Nations mandate, the South African military police was initially charged with law enforcement duties.

SWAPOL was established in 1920, modeled after the South African Police (SAP) but with a stronger paramilitary character due to the area's vast, sparsely populated terrain and its initial focus on tribal policing, stock theft control and maintenance of South African rule.

In 1939, the government under Prime Minister Jan Smuts implemented a number of measures in respect to SWAPOL, in particular, it was merged with the SAP for a number of reasons - one of them being the fear of pro-Nazi sympathies among the residents of German ancestry.

With South Africa becoming a republic in 1961 and the mandate being terminated by the United Nations in 1966, SAP closely co-operated with the South African Defence Force on counterinsurgency against the South West African People's Organisation (SWAPO) and its armed wing, the People's Liberation Army of Namibia (PLAN).

In the aftermath of the Turnhalle Constitutional Conference, SWAPOL was re-established as an attempt to legitimise the South African administration of the terrtitory. SAP reduced its direct role, but key units, like Koevoet, remained active. In 1985, Koevoet was transferred from SAP under SWAPOL's control.

With the proclamation of a new Namibian Constitution, SWAPOL was fully dissolved and replaced by the Namibian Police Force (NAMPOL) at independence.

== Role in Counterinsurgency ==
The first large scale contact between units of the police and the People's Liberation Army of Namibia was in 1968. On July 14, 1968, a Police Patrolling team from Eenhana District Police, led by Sergeant Fourie, W/O Nelumbu, B/Constable Bavingi, Constable Schaefer, Constable Hattingh and B/Constable Kauluma were patrolling the Eenhana-Outapi Highway when their Land Rover jeep came under machine gun fire and grenade attack from a band of guerillas from the bushes. Their jeep tyres having been shot away, Sgt. Fourie and W/O Nelumbu fired back with their side arms (pistols) and a wounded Constable Hattingh brought to bear the lone Sten Gun in the jeep to drive the attack away, in the process rescuing under fire a wounded B/Constable Kauluma, the driver, who had been thrown from the jeep and wounded. Following this attack Police radio patrols in the highway region were strengthened with an additional jeep with 2 Policemen armed with the R1 rifle (A variant of the FN FAL manufactured in South Africa). In 1970 the situation had deteriorated to the extent that all Policemen in the Northern Region were given training in the R1 and the Sten Gun, and the SAP Air Wing started twice daily helicopter patrols along the Eenhana-Outapi Road

Until 1970, the arms sanctioned for SAP units in South West Africa were as following:

1. Police Stations: 25 Batons, 8 Pistols, 3 Sten Guns, 12 Lee Enfield .303 Rifles, and 1 Bren light machine gun;
2. For District Police Reserve Forces: 150 Batons and Shields, 20 Tear Gas Guns, 30 Pistols, 18 Sten Guns, 10 R1 Rifles (introduced from December 1969) 36 Lee Enfield .303 Rifles, 20 Shotguns, and 4 Bren light machine guns;
3. For Mobile Patrol/Flying Squad team: 2 Pistols, 1 Sten Gun, 2 R1 Rifles.

Between 1974 and 1977, all Sten Guns and .303 Rifles were phased out and replaced with R1 Rifles. 4 M2 Browning heavy machine guns, 2 of them mounted on mobile patrol, were also assigned to the District Police Reserve from 1974 onwards, and 1 M2 Browning assigned to each Police Station. From 1978 onwards, 2 105mm Recoilless Rifles were assigned to each Police Circle Reserve. Casspirs were provided at the level of District Reserve from 1982 onwards and at Police Stations from 1984 onwards.

== Rank Structure ==
From 1981 until 1990, the rank structure of SWAPOL was as follows:

1. Major General
2. Brigadier
3. Colonel
4. Chief Superintendent
5. Superintendent
6. Inspector
7. Sub-Inspector
8. First Sergeant
9. Second Sergeant
10. Constable

There were also special constables.

== Organization ==
Until 1981, the organization of the SAP in South West Africa was as follows:

1. Police Stations (divided into several Outposts, Beats and Mobile Patrols/Flying Squad) led by a Lieutenant or an Inspector;
2. District Police/Investigation Centres (controlling around 4 Police Stations and having an Armed Reserve) commanded by a Major;
3. Police Circles (controlling 3 Districts) led by a Colonel;
4. Regional Police Commands (controlling 2 to 3 Circles or an entire Bantustan) commanded by a Brigadier;
5. Four Super-Commands of North, South, Coastal and Koevoet, commanded by Major Generals;
6. The Cities of Walvis Bay and Windhoek were at the level of Super-Command;
7. The Air Wing was at the level of a Regional Police Command. The Air Wing maintained a Central Fleet of 20 helicopters and a further fleet of 6 helicopters under each of the Regional Commands;
8. There were other functional and Staff Directorates led by Brigadiers, such as Criminal Investigation, Forensics, Administration, Intelligence, Training, Communications/Wireless, Economic Offences, Personnel, Traffic, Provisioning, and Establishment.

== Koevoet ==
SWAPOL's most controversial unit was its counter-insurgency division, which was known officially as SWAPOL-COIN or Operation K, but more commonly referred to as Koevoet. Koevoet was initially an autonomous unit under the nominal authority of the SAP Security Branch, but became part of SWAPOL in 1985. Koevoet worked closely with SWAPOL's own Security Branch in investigating crimes of a political nature, namely politically motivated murders. The unit was better known for its combat operations against insurgents of the People's Liberation Army of Namibia (PLAN) in Ovamboland, which earned it a formidable reputation. Koevoet's hybrid status as a paramilitary police unit made it something of a legal anomaly; for example, it lacked the mandate to hold insurgents as prisoners of war. Insurgents were technically supposed to be apprehended for trial in open courts as common law criminals. Based on this interpretation, the South West African courts ruled that insurgents captured by Koevoet had to be granted legal representation and could not be detained indefinitely.

With the South African Border War drawing to a close in mid-1989, Koevoet was greatly reduced in size and most of its personnel were reassigned to other divisions by SWAPOL. Additionally, many of the South African personnel were transferred back to the South African Police or the Homeland Forces. In 1988, SWAPOL consisted of 6,500 uniformed personnel, including the 3000-man Koevoet force and the 300-man Air Wing, of which 4000 were local Blacks, 800 were local Whites, 1000 were South African Whites and 700 were South African Blacks. The local Municipal Constabulary, Homeland Guards and Traffic Police were entirely locals, both Black and White Nevertheless, the unit's continued existence was the subject of much controversy, as both current and former Koevoet operators were accused of political intimidation and human rights abuses. United Nations Security Council Resolution 640 explicitly named Koevoet as being a barrier to the peace process in Namibia and demanded its disbandment. SWAPOL dissolved the unit on October 30, 1989.

== See also ==
- South African Border War
- South African Defence Force
- South West Africa Territorial Force
