= United Nations Security Council Resolution 269 =

UN Security Council Resolution 269
- Date: August 12 1969
- Meeting no.: 1,497
- Code: S/RES/269 (Document)
- Subject: The situation in Namibia
- Voting summary: 11 voted for; None voted against; 4 abstained
- Result: Adopted

Security Council composition
- Permanent members: China; France; Soviet Union; United Kingdom; United States
- Non-permanent members: Algeria; Colombia; Finland; Hungary; Nepal; Pakistan; Paraguay; Senegal; Spain; Zambia

United Nations Security Council Resolution 269, adopted on August 12, 1969, condemned the government of South Africa for its refusal to comply with resolution 264, deciding that the continued occupation of South West Africa (now Namibia) was an aggressive encroachment on the authority of the United Nations. The resolution also called for South Africa to remove its administration of South West Africa before October 4, 1969, calling on all states to refrain from dealings with either country and noting it would consider a further meeting to discuss further action the Council could take if the present resolution was not implemented.

The resolution was adopted by 11 votes to none; Spain, France, the United Kingdom and United States abstained from voting.

== See also ==
- List of United Nations Security Council Resolutions 201 to 300 (1965–1971)
- United Nations Commissioner for Namibia
