= United Nations Security Council Resolution 431 =

UN Security Council Resolution 431
- Namibia
- Date: 27 July 1978
- Meeting no.: 2,082
- Code: S/RES/431 (Document)
- Subject: Namibia
- Voting summary: 13 voted for; None voted against; 2 abstained
- Result: Adopted

Security Council composition
- Permanent members: China; France; Soviet Union; United Kingdom; United States
- Non-permanent members: Bolivia; Canada; Czechoslovakia; Gabon; India; Kuwait; Mauritius; Nigeria; Venezuela; West Germany

United Nations Security Council Resolution 431, adopted on July 27, 1978, after recalling resolution 385 (1976), the Council took note of a proposal of a solution to the situation in Namibia and asked the Secretary-General to appoint a Special Representative for Namibia to ensure the independence of Namibia from South Africa as soon as possible. It also called on all concerned to exert their best efforts to resolve the issue, so that free and fair elections could be held.

Resolution 431 was adopted by 13 votes to none; Czechoslovak Socialist Republic and the Soviet Union abstained from voting.

== See also ==
- List of United Nations Security Council Resolutions 401 to 500 (1976–1982)
- Namibian War of Independence
- United Nations Commissioner for Namibia
- South West Africa
