= United Nations Security Council Resolution 301 =

UN Security Council Resolution 301
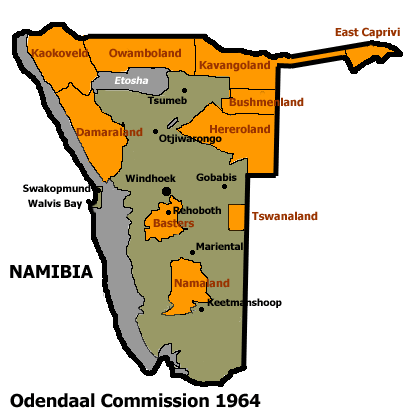
- Bantustans in South West Africa (Namibia)
- Date: 20 October 1971
- Meeting no.: 1,598
- Code: S/RES/301 (Document)
- Subject: The situation in Namibia
- Voting summary: 13 voted for; None voted against; 2 abstained
- Result: Adopted

Security Council composition
- Permanent members: China; France; Soviet Union; United Kingdom; United States
- Non-permanent members: Argentina; Belgium; Burundi; Italy; Japan; Nicaragua; Poland; Sierra Leone; Somalia; Syria

United Nations Security Council Resolution 301, adopted on October 20, 1971, after reaffirming previous resolutions on the topic, the Council condemned the Bantustans, which they described as moves designed to destroy unity and territorial integrity along with South Africa's continued illegal presence in South West Africa (now known as Namibia).

The Council finished by calling upon all states to support the rights of the people of Namibia by fully implementing the provisions of this resolutions and requested the Secretary-General to report periodically on the implementation of the resolution.

The resolution was adopted by 13 votes to none, with France and the Soviet Union abstaining.

This was the last resolution adopted prior to the expulsion of the Republic of China (headquartered in Taiwan) from the United Nations, when the People's Republic of China (headquartered on the mainland) replaced it.

== See also ==
- List of United Nations Security Council Resolutions 301 to 400 (1971–1976)
- South Africa under apartheid
