= List of colonial governors of South West Africa =

Colonial governor of South West Africa
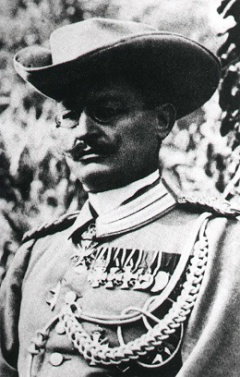
- Longest serving Theodor Leutwein; 15 March 1894–19 August 1905
- German South West Africa
- Formation: 9 April 1883
- First holder: Heinrich Vogelsang
- Final holder: Louis Pienaar
- Abolished: 21 March 1990
- Succession: President of Namibia

This article lists the colonial governors of South West Africa. South West Africa was the colonial predecessor of the modern day Republic of Namibia from when the territory was controlled by the German Empire (as German South West Africa) and the Union of South Africa.

The title of the position changed a number of times. Under German rule, the title of the position went from Commissioner (1884–1893) to Provincial Governor (Landeshauptleute) (1893–1898) to Governor (1898–1915). Under South African rule, the title was Administrator (1915–1977) and Administrator-General (1977–1990).

After the United Nations terminated South Africa's mandate to govern South West Africa, the UN appointed commissioners of its own. They had no authority and South Africa refused to recognize them, and are not included here.

== List ==
- Dates in italics indicate de facto continuation of office

=== German South West Africa ===
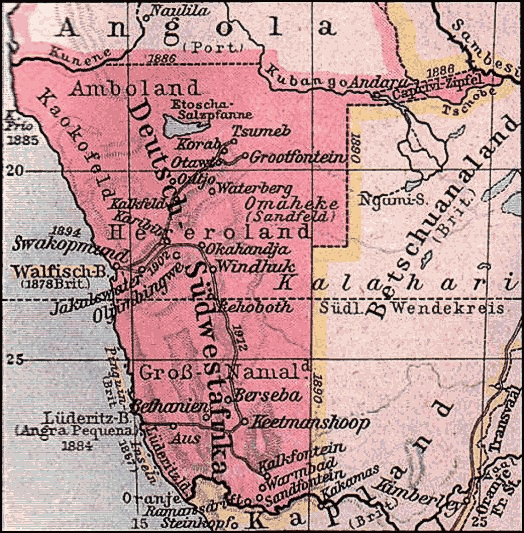
Map of German South West Africa, 1904. It shows the Penguin Islands, which is rare in maps of this region.

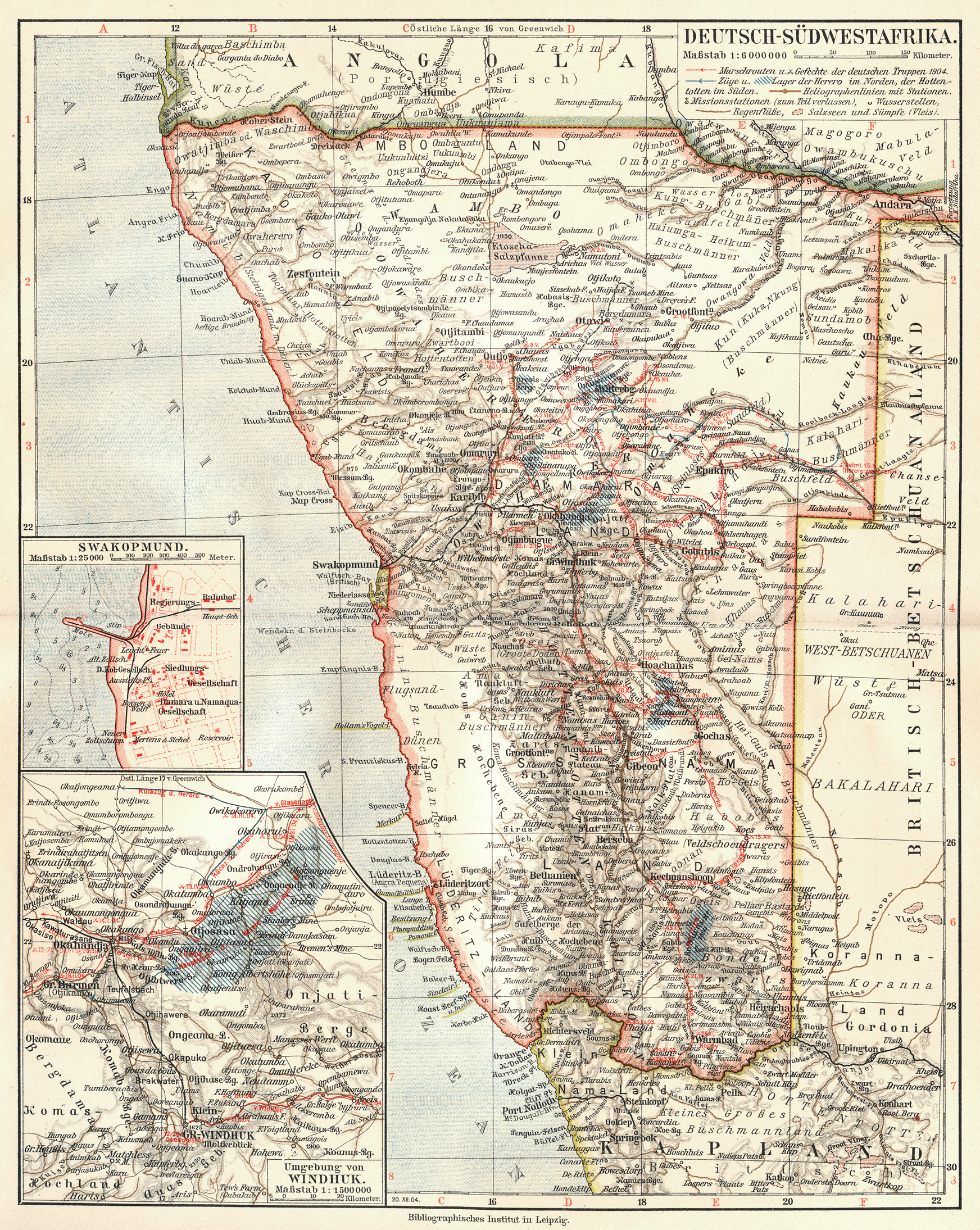
Map of German South West Africa (bordered in red), 1905.

No.	Portrait	Name (Birth–Death)	Term of office		
No.	Portrait	Name (Birth–Death)	Took office	Left office	Time in office
Magistrat (Magistrate)
–		Heinrich Vogelsang (1862–1914); Acting	9 April 1883	12 May 1883	33 days
1		Adolf Lüderitz (1834–1886)	12 May 1883	7 October 1884	1 year, 148 days
Reichskommissar (Imperial commissioner)
2		Gustav Nachtigal (1834–1885)	7 October 1884	20 April 1885 †	195 days
–		Heinrich Ernst Göring (1839–1913); Acting	20 April 1885	August 1890	5 years, 3 months
–		Louis Nels (1855–1910); Acting	August 1890	March 1891	7 months
3		Curt von François (1852–1931)	March 1891	November 1893	2 years, 8 months
Landeshauptleute (Administrator)
3		Curt von François (1852–1931)	November 1893	15 March 1894	4 months
4		Theodor Leutwein (1849–1921)	15 March 1894	27 June 1895	1 year, 104 days
4		Theodor Leutwein (1849–1921)	27 June 1895	18 April 1898	2 years, 295 days
Gouverneur (Governor)
4		Theodor Leutwein (1849–1921)	18 April 1898	19 August 1905	7 years, 123 days
–		Lothar von Trotha (1848–1920); Acting	19 August 1905	November 1905	2 months
5		Friedrich von Lindequist (1862–1945)	November 1905	20 May 1907	1 year, 6 months
6		Bruno von Schuckmann (1857–1919)	20 May 1907	20 June 1910	3 years, 31 days
7		Theodor Seitz (1863–1949)	28 August 1910	9 July 1915	4 years, 315 days

=== South West Africa ===
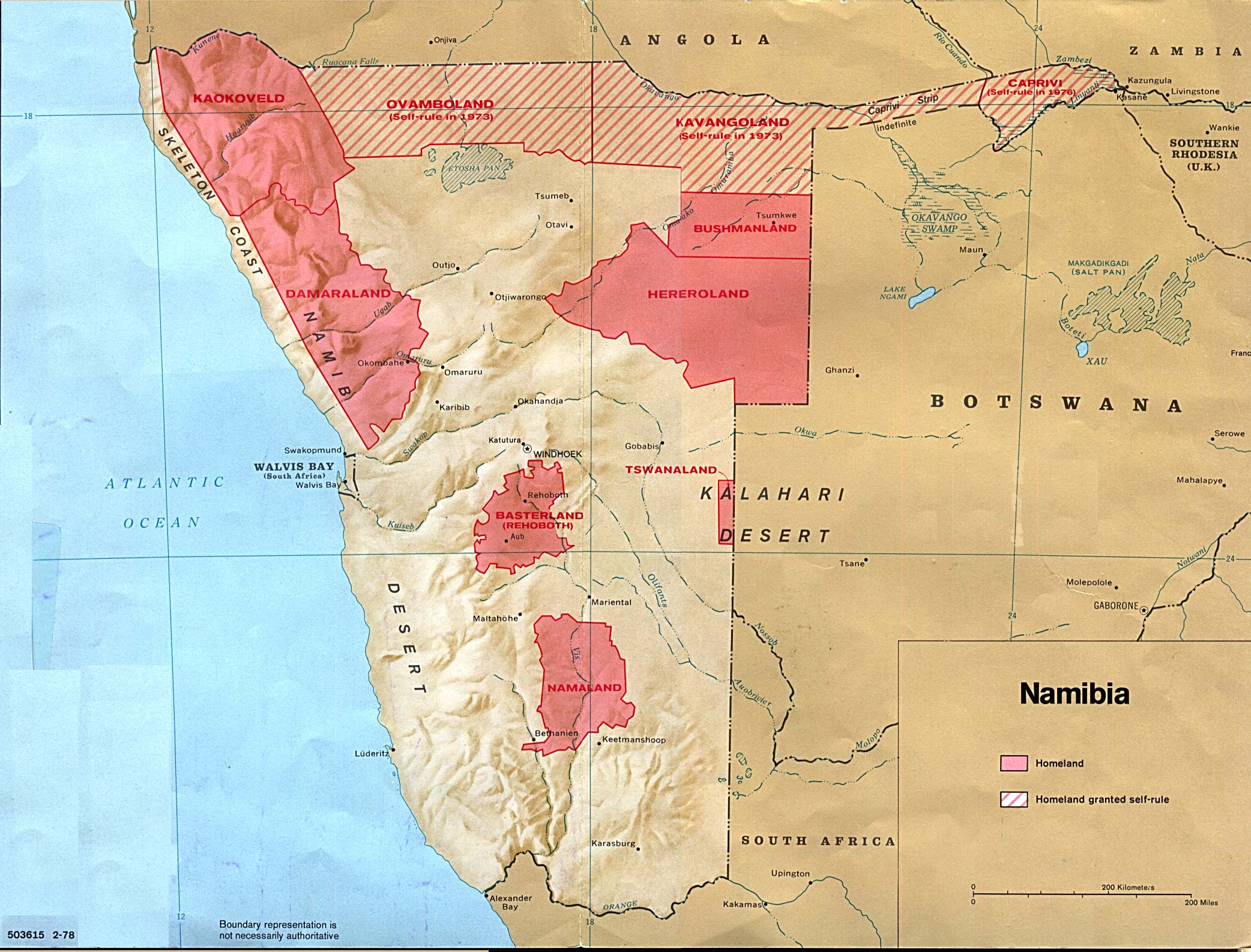
Map of South West Africa (Namibia) with bantustans highlighted (red), 1978.

No.	Portrait	Name (Birth–Death)	Term of office		
No.	Portrait	Name (Birth–Death)	Took office	Left office	Time in office
Occupation by South Africa
Military Governor
1		Louis Botha (1862–1919)	9 July 1915	11 July 1915	2 days
2		Percival Scott Beves (1863/68–1924)	11 July 1915	30 October 1915	111 days
Administrator
3		Sir Edmond Gorges (1872–1924)	31 October 1915	1 October 1920	4 years, 336 days
4		Gysbert Reitz Hofmeyr (1871–1942)	1 October 1920	17 December 1920	77 days
League of Nations mandate (administered by South Africa)
4		Gysbert Reitz Hofmeyr (1871–1942)	17 December 1920	1 April 1926	5 years, 105 days
5		Albertus Johannes Werth (1888–1948)	1 April 1926	1 April 1933	7 years
6		David Gideon Conradie (1879–1966)	1 April 1933	1 April 1943	10 years
7		Petrus Imker Hoogenhout (1884–1970)	1 April 1943	6 December 1951	8 years, 249 days
8		Albertus Johannes Roux van Rhijn (1890–1971)	6 December 1951	1 December 1953	1 year, 360 days
9		Daniel du Plessis Viljoen (1892–1972)	1 December 1953	1 December 1963	10 years
10		Wentzel Christoffel du Plessis (1904–1988)	1 December 1963	1 November 1968	4 years, 336 days
South African occupation of Namibia
11		Johannes van der Wath (1903–1986)	1 November 1968	1 November 1971	3 years
12		Barend van der Walt (1914–2002)	1 November 1971	1 September 1977	5 years, 304 days
Administrator-General
13		Marthinus T. Steyn (1920–1998)	1 September 1977	7 August 1979	1 year, 340 days
14		Gerrit Viljoen (1926–2009)	7 August 1979	4 September 1980	1 year, 28 days
15		Danie Hough (1937–2008)	4 September 1980	1 February 1983	2 years, 150 days
16		Willie van Niekerk (1937–2009)	1 February 1983	1 July 1985	2 years, 150 days
17		Louis Pienaar (1926–2012)	1 July 1985	21 March 1990	4 years, 263 days

== See also ==
- President of Namibia
- Vice President of Namibia
- Prime Minister of Namibia
- Deputy Prime Minister of Namibia
- United Nations Commissioner for Namibia
- Transitional Government of National Unity (Namibia)
- Walvis Bay
  - List of colonial governors of Walvis Bay
- History of Namibia
- Politics of Namibia
