= Tripartite Accord (1988) =

1988 treaty between Angola, Cuba and South Africa

Agreement among the People's Republic of Angola, the Republic of Cuba, and the Republic of South Africa
- Type: Peace treaty
- Context: Cold War
- Signed: 22 December 1988; 37 years ago
- Location: New York City, Headquarters of the United Nations
- Signatories: Isidoro Malmierca Peoli _{(Foreign Minister of Cuba)}; Afonso Van-Dunem _{(Foreign Minister of Angola)}; Roelof F. Botha _{(Foreign Minister of South Africa)}
- Parties: Cuba; Angola; South Africa
- Languages: Portuguese; Spanish; English

The Agreement among the People's Republic of Angola, the Republic of Cuba, and the Republic of South Africa (also known as the Tripartite Accord, Three Powers Accord or New York Accords) granted independence to Namibia (then known as South West Africa) from South Africa and ended the direct involvement of foreign troops in the Angolan Civil War. The accords were signed on 22 December 1988 at the United Nations Headquarters in New York City by the Foreign Ministers of People's Republic of Angola (Afonso Van-Dunem), Republic of Cuba (Isidoro Malmierca Peoli) and Republic of South Africa (Roelof F. Botha).

== Negotiations ==
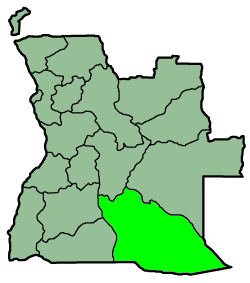
Angola's Cuando Cubango province

In 1981 Chester Crocker, U.S. assistant secretary of state for African affairs for newly elected United States President Ronald Reagan, had developed a linkage policy. It tied apartheid South Africa's agreement to relinquish control of Namibia, in line with United Nations Security Council Resolution 435, and to retreat from Angola, to Cuba's withdrawing its troops from Angola. On 10 September 1986 Cuban president Fidel Castro accepted Crocker's proposal in principle. The South African government also accepted the principle of linkage; it proposed the concept at the UN 7th Plenary Meeting on 20 September 1986 (the Question of Namibia).

The concept was strongly rejected by a Cuban-backed majority, with representatives strongly stating their opposition to the effect of, "... The UN.... Calls upon South Africa to desist from linking the independence of Namibia to irrelevant and extraneous issues such as the presence of Cuban troops in Angola as such linkage is incompatible with the relevant United Nations resolutions, particularly Security Council resolution 435 (1978);..."

The Angolan and United States governments started bilateral talks in June 1987 while the civil war continued. There is disagreement amongst historians on how the various parties agreed to come to the table:

1. Cuba contends that its military successes against the South Africans in Angola drove the South Africans to the negotiating table. They claim their intervention in the defence of Cuito Cuanavale stopped UNITA and South African offensives. They believe that UNITA and South Africa retreated after a 15-hour battle on 23 March, and moved for negotiations when the stakes became too high. While the negotiations started in June 1987, during the latter half of 1987 South African had numerous military successes. In addition, the major Cuban military surge did not take place until 1988, long after the negotiations had commenced.
2. South Africa places the events in the context of the end of the Cold War, with an associated end to the threat of Communist expansion in the region. From an economic perspective, the effect of sanctions was beginning to be felt in South Africa, while Namibia was costing South Africa over 1 billion Rand annually. Also, the South African domestic political landscape was changing rapidly and the country was under considerable pressure at the United Nations to grant independence to Namibia. The Cubans too faced the economic pressures of the war, as the MPLA government of Angola had stopped paying Cuba for its services.

In the words of Chester Crocker, "Watching South Africa and Cuba at the table was like watching two scorpions in a bottle."

After refusing direct talks with Cuba, the US agreed to include a Cuban delegation in the negotiations, who joined on January 28, 1988. The three parties held a round of negotiations on March 9 in London. The South African government joined negotiations in Cairo on 3 May expecting UN Security Resolution 435 to be modified. Defence Minister Magnus Malan and President P.W. Botha asserted that South Africa would withdraw from Angola only "if Russia and its proxies did the same." They did not mention withdrawing from Namibia. On 16 March 1988, the South African Business Day reported that Pretoria was "offering to withdraw into Namibia – not from Namibia – in return for the withdrawal of Cuban forces from Angola. The implication is that South Africa has no real intention of giving up the territory any time soon." However the UN plenary meeting of 1986 indicates that the South Africans were linking Namibian independence with Cuban withdrawal. The Cuban negotiator, Jorge Risquet, announced that Cuba would stay in Angola until the end of apartheid, probably also as a negotiation ploy. (Apartheid did not end until more than 4 years after Cuba left Angola).

The Cubans suggested that the U.S. was worried whether the Cuban forces would stop their advance at the Namibian border. Jorge Risquet, head of the Cuban delegation, rejected the South African demands, noting that "South Africa must face the fact that it will not obtain at the negotiating table what it could not achieve on the battlefield."

According to the book 32 Battalion by Piet Nortje, during this campaign South Africa introduced its new secret weapons, the G5 and G6 howitzer guns. The cannons can fire a projectile over 40 kilometres (25 mi) with a high degree of accuracy. The guns were used to halt the Cuban advance to the south and raised the specter of yet another unaffordable arms escalation between two medium-sized military powers. The South Africans assert that the new weapon raised Cuba's fear of more casualties in a war where Cuban fatalities had outnumbered South African fatalities by a factor 10. Conversely, the Cuban air force held air superiority, as was demonstrated by the bombing of the strategic Calueque complex, and the overflights in 1988 of Cuban Mig-23s of Namibian airspace. According to David Albright, South Africa believed that the discovery of preparations for a nuclear weapon test at the Vastrap facility created an urgency amongst the superpowers to find a solution.

While the hostilities in Angola continued, the parties met in June and August in New York City and Geneva. Finally, all approved an outline agreement of Principles for a Peaceful Settlement in South Western Africa on 20 July. During the negotiations, the South Africans were asked to release imprisoned ANC activist Nelson Mandela as a sign of goodwill, which was denied. A ceasefire was finally agreed upon on August 8, 1988. Mandela remained in prison until 2 February 1990, when South Africa lifted the ban on activities of the African National Congress.

The negotiations were finalised in New York with Angola, Cuba and South Africa signing the accord on 22 December 1988. It provided for the retreat of South African forces from Angola, which had already taken place by 30 August; the withdrawal of South Africa from Namibia; and Namibia's independence and the withdrawal of Cuban forces from Angola within 30 months.

The agreement followed the American linkage proposal which had also been pushed by South Africa on numerous occasions in 1984 and in 1986 (the UN plenary meeting). Namibia was to gain independence on terms that South Africa had set out, including multi-party democracy, a capitalist free-market economy, and a transition period.

The signing of the agreement was marred by the death of Bernt Carlsson, the United Nations Commissioner for Namibia, who had contributed to the agreement but was killed on Pan Am Flight 103, on his way to the signing ceremony.

== Implementation ==
The South African Army left Angola by 30 August 1988, before the conditions for Cuba's withdrawal had been agreed. Cuban troops began withdrawing on 10 January 1989, and the withdrawal was finalised in stages one month early on 25 May 1991.

The Angolan government offered an amnesty to UNITA troops under the premise that UNITA would be integrated into the MPLA under a one-party state economy. That concept was rejected by UNITA. The situation in the country was anything but settled, and civil war continued for more than a decade.

According to Presidents of Foreign Policy by Edward R. Drachman and Alan Shank, a series of meetings and accords between UNITA and the MPLA, brokered by various African leaders, failed horribly. UNITA was insulted by MPLA's insistence on a premise of a one-party state. A combination of MPLA dismay of intervention from the USA (backing UNITA and forcing a shift in power) led to the MPLA dropping the one-party state and opening the door to a multi-party democracy, with the inclusion of UNITA as a competing party. After some 18 years of war, that was a tremendous breakthrough.

The elections were declared "generally" free and fair by the UN, with the MPLA gaining just under 50% of the vote. However UNITA, along with eight opposition parties and many other election observers, said that the election had been neither free nor fair. Following the Halloween Massacre, UNITA leader Jonas Savimbi directed UNITA forces to take up arms again against the MPLA. However, the US now opposed UNITA, instead pressuring Savimbi to accept the election results. The war ended after Savimbi's death, in 2002.

In preparation for independence, free elections in Namibia were held in November 1989, with SWAPO taking 57% of the vote. Namibia gained independence in March 1990. SWAPO was originally a Marxist party that intended to install a one-party state. The South African government rejected that premise until the fall of the Soviet Union and SWAPO assured that it would support a multi-party democracy.

South Africa held onto Namibia's economic port of Walvis Bay for an additional 18 months until it was assured that SWAPO would respect the newly founded constitution and the principle of a multi-party democracy.

As part of the Tripartite Accord, the African National Congress, the Marxist-leaning guerrilla/freedom movement conducting guerrilla attacks in South Africa to end apartheid, would remove its bases from Angola and no longer received support from the Angolan MPLA. The ANC moved its operations to Zambia and Uganda. Later, the ANC also dropped its Marxist philosophy and was accepted into the wider South African Democratic Movement, which supported political change in the country.

After the government repealed a ban on ANC activities, it eventually won democratic elections in South Africa, became the ruling party of a multi-party, democratic South Africa.

== See also ==
- Cuban intervention in Angola
- Alvor Accord
- Bicesse Accords
- Lusaka Protocol
- Nakuru Agreement
