= United Nations Security Council Resolution 432 =

UN Security Council Resolution 432
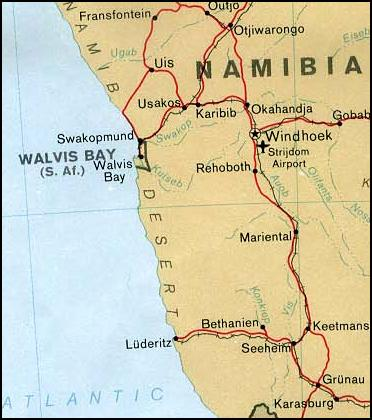
- Location of Walvis Bay and reference to South Africa
- Date: 27 July 1978
- Meeting no.: 2,082
- Code: S/RES/432 (Document)
- Subject: Namibia
- Voting summary: 15 voted for; None voted against; None abstained
- Result: Adopted

Security Council composition
- Permanent members: China; France; Soviet Union; United Kingdom; United States
- Non-permanent members: Bolivia; Canada; Czechoslovakia; Gabon; India; Kuwait; Mauritius; Nigeria; Venezuela; West Germany

United Nations Security Council Resolution 432, adopted unanimously on July 27, 1978, after reaffirming previous resolutions on the topic including 385 (1976), the Council urged for respect of Namibia's territorial integrity by South Africa and called for the full integration of Walvis Bay back into Namibia. The town had been directly administered by South Africa.

== See also ==
- List of United Nations Security Council Resolutions 401 to 500 (1976–1982)
