= United Nations Security Council Resolution 385 =

UN Security Council Resolution 385
- South West Africa (Namibia)
- Date: 30 January 1976
- Meeting no.: 1,885
- Code: S/RES/385 (Document)
- Subject: The situation in Namibia
- Voting summary: 15 voted for; None voted against; None abstained
- Result: Adopted

Security Council composition
- Permanent members: China; France; Soviet Union; United Kingdom; United States
- Non-permanent members: Benin; Guyana; Italy; Japan; Libya; Pakistan; Panama; Romania; Sweden; Tanzania

United Nations Security Council Resolution 385, adopted unanimously on January 30, 1976, recalled previous resolutions on the topic as well as an advisory opinion of the International Court of Justice that South Africa was under obligation to withdraw its presence from the Territory of Namibia. The Resolution reaffirmed the United Nations' legal responsibility over Namibia, expressed its concern over the continued illegal actions of South Africa and deplored the militarization of Namibia.

The Council then demanded that South Africa put an end to its policy of bantustans and its attempts calculated to evade the demands of the United Nations. The rest of the resolution demands that South Africa promise to allow a UN-organized election to select a future government, release all political prisoners, leave Namibia and respect international law.

== See also ==
- History of Namibia
- List of United Nations Security Council Resolutions 301 to 400 (1971–1976)
- South West Africa
