= South West Africa =

South African territory from 1915 to 1990

South West Africa: Suidwes-Afrika (Afrikaans); Südwestafrika (German); Zuidwest-Afrika (Dutch)
- 1915–1990
- Flag Coat of arms (1963–1980)
- Motto: Viribus Unitis (Latin) "With United Forces"
- Anthem: God Save the King (1915–1952); God Save the Queen (1952–1961) (Note: Remained the royal anthem until 1961.) Die Stem van Suid-Afrika (1938–1990) (English: "The Call of South Africa")
- Location of South West Africa (light green) within South Africa (dark green)
- Status: Occupied by South Africa (1916–1920); Class C League of Nations mandate of South Africa (1920–1966) De jure direct United Nations responsibility, de facto annexed by South Africa (1966–1990)
- Capital and largest city: Windhoek
- Official languages: English; Afrikaans; German
- Common languages: Khoekhoegowab; Oshiwambo; Otjiherero; RuKwangali; Setswana; siLozi
- Demonyms: South West African, Namibian
- Type: Dependent territory: under mandate status (until 1966); under direct governance; interim government (1985–1989)
- Administrator
  - 1915–1920: Sir Edmond Howard Lacam Gorges
  - 1985–1990: Louis Pienaar
- Chairman of TGNU
  - 1985: Dawid Bezuidenhout
  - 1989: Harry Booysen
- Legislature: Legislative Assembly (1926–1979); National Assembly (1979–1983; 1985–1989); Direct rule (1983–1985)
- Historical era: World War I; Interwar period; World War II; Cold War
  - Occupation started: 9 July 1915
  - Treaty of Versailles: 28 June 1919
  - Mandate repealed by the UN: 27 October 1966
  - South African Border War: 1966–1990
  - TGNU installed: 17 June 1985
  - Tripartite Accord: 22 December 1988
  - Parliamentary election: 7–11 November 1989
  - Independence: 21 March 1990
- Currency: South West African pound and South African pound (1920–1961); South African rand (1961–1990)
Preceded by	Succeeded by
German South West Africa	Republic of Namibia
- Today part of: Namibia

South West Africa (Note: Afrikaans: Suidwes-Afrika German: Südwestafrika Dutch: Zuidwest-Afrika) was a colonial territory under the South African government from 1915 to 1990. Renamed Namibia by the United Nations in 1968, once the country became independent the name was formally adopted on 21 March 1990.

South West Africa bordered Angola (a Portuguese colony before 1975), Botswana (Bechuanaland before 1966), South Africa, and Zambia (Northern Rhodesia before 1964). During its administration, South Africa applied its own apartheid system in the territory of South West Africa.

A German colony known as German South West Africa from 1884 to 1915, it was made a League of Nations mandate of the Union of South Africa following Germany's defeat in World War I. Although the mandate was repealed by the United Nations on 27 October 1966, South African control over the territory continued. The territory was administered directly by the South African government from 1915 to 1978, when the Turnhalle Constitutional Conference laid the groundwork for semi-autonomous rule. During an interim period between 1978 and 1985, South Africa gradually granted South West Africa a limited form of home rule, culminating in the formation of a Transitional Government of National Unity.

== German colony ==
As a German colony from 1884, it was known as German South West Africa (Deutsch-Südwestafrika). Germany had a difficult time administering the territory, which experienced many insurrections against the harsh German rule, especially those led by guerrilla leader Jacob Morenga. The main port, Walvis Bay, and the Penguin Islands were annexed by the United Kingdom in 1878, becoming part of the Cape Colony in 1884. Following the creation of the Union of South Africa in 1910, Walvis Bay became part of the Cape Province.

As part of the Heligoland–Zanzibar Treaty in 1890, a corridor of land taken from the northern border of Bechuanaland, extending as far as the Zambezi River, was added to the colony. It was named the Caprivi Strip (Caprivizipfel) after the German Chancellor Leo von Caprivi.

== South African rule ==
In 1915, during the South West Africa campaign of World War I, South Africa captured the German colony. After the war, it was declared a League of Nations Class C Mandate territory under the Treaty of Versailles, with the Union of South Africa responsible for the administration of South West Africa. From 1922, this included Walvis Bay, which, under the South West Africa Affairs Act, was governed as if it were part of the mandated territory. South West Africa remained a League of Nations Mandate until World War II and the collapse of the League of Nations.

The Mandate was supposed to become a United Nations Trust Territory when League of Nations Mandates were transferred to the United Nations following World War II. The Prime Minister, Jan Smuts, objected to South West Africa coming under UN control and refused to allow the territory's transition to independence, instead seeking to make it South Africa's fifth province in 1946.

In 1949, the South West Africa Affairs Act was amended to give representation in the Parliament of South Africa to whites in South West Africa, which gave them six seats in the House of Assembly and four in the Senate.

This was to the advantage of the National Party, which enjoyed strong support from the predominantly Afrikaner and ethnic German white population in the territory. These actions by the South African government were challenged at the UN, by priest Michael Scott, on behalf of South West African people. Between 1950 and 1977, all of South West Africa's parliamentary seats were held by the National Party.

An additional consequence of this was the extension of apartheid legislation to the territory. This gave rise to several rulings at the International Court of Justice, which in 1950 ruled that South Africa was not obliged to convert South West Africa into a UN trust territory, but was still bound by the League of Nations Mandate, with the United Nations General Assembly assuming the supervisory role. The ICJ also clarified that the General Assembly was empowered to receive petitions from the inhabitants of South West Africa and to call for reports from the mandatory nation, South Africa. The General Assembly constituted the Committee on South West Africa to perform the supervisory functions.

In another advisory opinion issued in 1955, the Court further ruled that the General Assembly was not required to follow League of Nations voting procedures in determining questions concerning South West Africa. In 1956, the Court further ruled that the committee had the power to grant hearings to petitioners from the mandated territory. In 1960, Ethiopia and Liberia filed a case in the International Court of Justice against South Africa alleging that South Africa had not fulfilled its mandatory duties. This case did not succeed, with the Court ruling in 1966 that they were not the proper parties to bring the case.

=== Mandate terminated ===
There was a protracted struggle between South Africa and forces fighting for independence, particularly after the formation of the South West Africa People's Organisation (SWAPO) in 1960..

On 27 October 1966, the General Assembly passed resolution 2145 (XXI) which declared the Mandate terminated and that the Republic of South Africa had no further right to administer South West Africa. South African control over the territory nevertheless continued despite its illegality under international law. In 1971, acting on a request for an Advisory Opinion from the United Nations Security Council, the ICJ ruled that the continued presence of South Africa in Namibia was illegal and that South Africa was under an obligation to withdraw from Namibia immediately. It also ruled that all member states of the United Nations were under an obligation not to recognise as valid any act performed by South Africa on behalf of Namibia.

South West Africa became known as Namibia by the UN when the General Assembly changed the territory's name by Resolution 2372 (XXII) of 12 June 1968. SWAPO was recognised as representative of the Namibian people, and gained UN observer status when the territory of South West Africa was already removed from the list of non-self-governing territories.

In 1977, South Africa transferred control of Walvis Bay back to the Cape Province, thereby making it an exclave.

=== Bantustans (1968–1980) ===
The South African authorities established 10 bantustans in South West Africa in the late 1960s and early 1970s in accordance with the Odendaal Commission, three of which were granted self-rule. These bantustans were replaced with separate ethnicity-based second-tier representative authorities in 1980.

Bantustan	Capital	Most represented tribe	Legislative Council established	Self-government	Representative Authority years
Ovamboland	Ondangua	Ovambo	1968	1973	1980–1989 (1990)
Kavangoland	Rundu	Kavango	1970	1973	1980–1989 (1990)
East Caprivi	Katima Mulilo	Lozi	1972	1976	1980–1989 (1990)
Namaland	Keetmanshoop	Nama	1976	—	1980–1989 (1990)
Rehoboth	Rehoboth	Baster	1977	—	1980–1989 (1990)
Damaraland	Welwitschia	Damara	1977	—	1980–1989 (1990)
Hereroland	Okakarara	Herero	—	—	1980–1989 (1990)
Tswanaland	Aminuis	Tswana	—	—	1980–1989 (1990)
Bushmanland	Tsumkwe	San	—	—	—
Kaokoland	Ohopoho	Himba	—	—	—

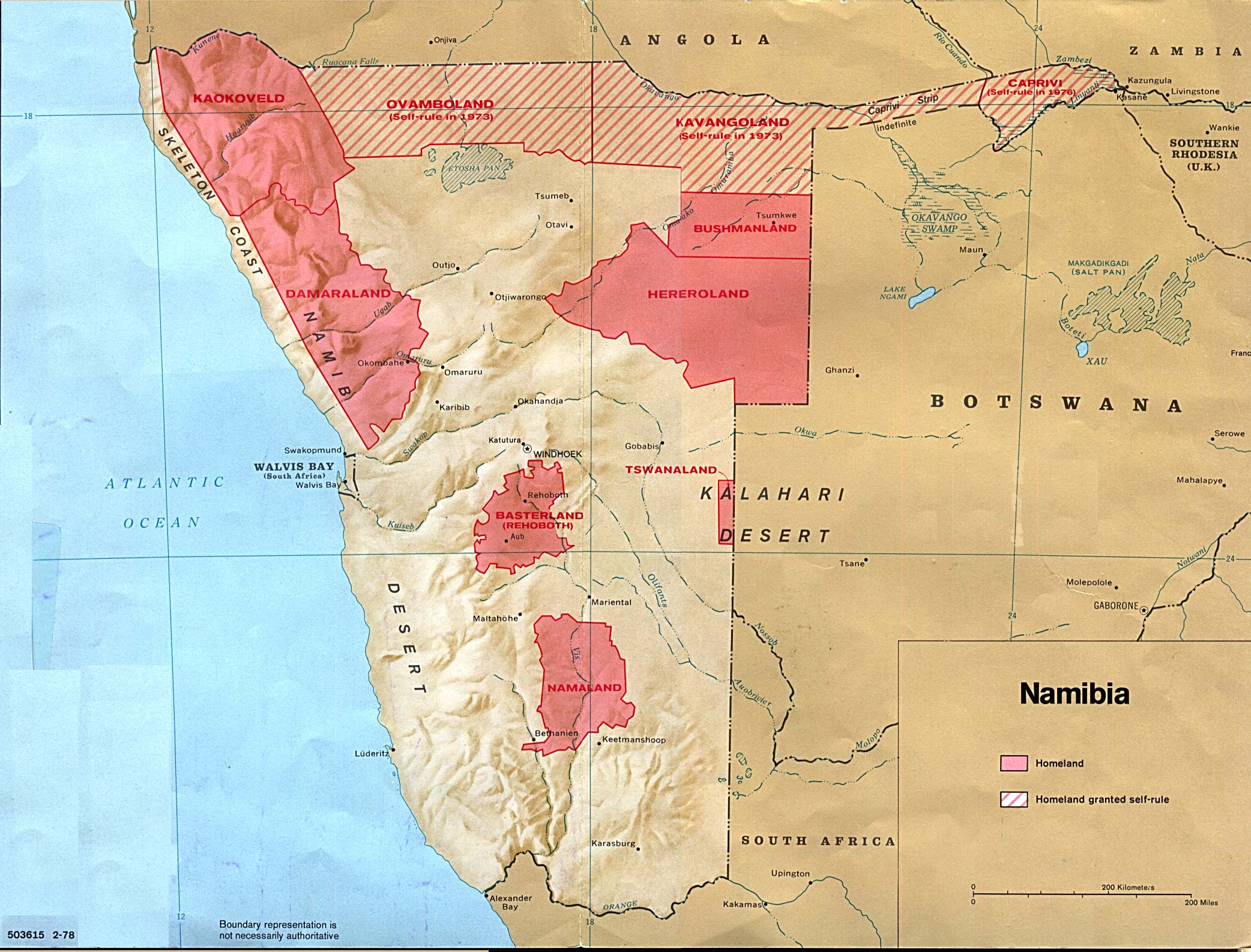
Bantustans in South West Africa as of 1978

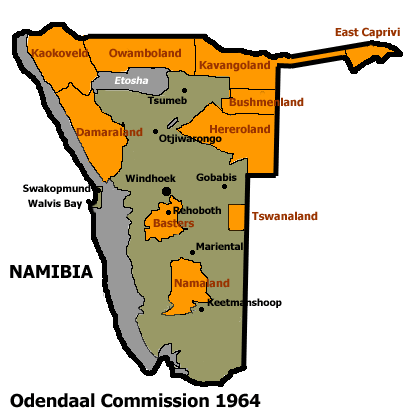
Allocation of land to Bantustans according to the Odendaal Plan, with grey being the Etosha National Park

=== Three-tier system of governance (1980–1989) ===
The South African government convened the Turnhalle Constitutional Conference between 1976 and 1978 with a view to achieving an "internal" solution to the status of South West Africa. The conference was attended by representatives of 11 ethnic groups: Herero, Baster, Tswana, Damara, Ovambo, Lozi, Nama, Kavango, San, the Coloureds, and the Whites. However, the largest freedom movement, SWAPO, was not invited. The conference produced a 29-page document entitled "Petition for the establishment of an interim government". The petition contained a request to set up an interim government for the territory, as well as a draft constitution for "a republican, democratic state" to be known as "South West Africa/Namibia" with its own flag and national anthem.

Under the proposals, there was to be a three-tiered system of governance. The first tier, the Central Government, would consist of a National Assembly which would appoint a Council of Ministers. The second tier would consist of ethnically based Representative Authorities and the third tier would be made up of Local Authorities.

==== Tier one: Central Government ====
Interim Government (1980–1983)

The upper tier of governance consisted of an elected fifty member National Assembly with legislative powers. The assembly would appoint a Council of Ministers with executive powers. Multi-racial elections for the National Assembly were held in December 1978. The Democratic Turnhalle Alliance (DTA) won 41 of the 50 seats and its leader, Dirk Mudge would become Chairman of the Council of Ministers on 1 July 1980. Johannes Skrywer, also of the DTA, became Speaker of the National Assembly.

The interim government collapsed on 18 January 1983 following the resignation of the Council of Ministers citing interference from the South African government and proposals to create a State Council.

Direct rule (1983–1985)

Following the collapse of the Interim Government, its legislative and executive powers returned to South African Administrator-General Willie van Niekerk, who was assisted by and Jan F Greebe as chief executive officer. The Representative Authorities and Local Authorities continued to function as intended during this period.

Transitional Government of National Unity (1985–1989)

A Multi-Party Conference was established in September 1983 to suggest arrangements for the formation of a new Central Government. Nineteen parties participated in the conference, but again SWAPO was excluded.

The Multi-Party Conference issued the Windhoek Declaration of Basic Principles in 1984 and a Bill of Fundamental Rights and Objectives the following year, resulting in the establishment of a Transitional Government of National Unity (TGNU) on 17 June 1985.

Unlike the previous Interim Government, the TGNU was not directly elected but instead consisted of an appointed 62 member National Assembly and an 8-member Council of Ministers which would be led by each member on a three-month rotational basis. The DTA was awarded 22 seats in the National Assembly with five other parties being awarded 8 seats each. Johannes Skrywer would again become Speaker of the National Assembly and Dawid Bezuidenhout would be the first Chairman of the Council of Ministers.

==== Tier two: Representative Authorities ====
The second-tier of governance in South West Africa consisted of ethnic-based Representative Authorities which replaced the previous system of Bantustans that were established in the late 1960s and early 1970s. Each authority would have executive and legislative competencies, being made up of elected Legislative Assemblies who would appoint Executive Committees led by chairmen. Representative Authorities had responsibility for land tenure, agriculture, education up to primary level, teachers' training, health services, and social welfare and pensions and their Legislative Assemblies had the ability to pass legislation known as Ordinances. Unlike the former Bantustans, Representative Authorities functioned on the basis of ethnicity only and were no longer based on geographically defined areas.

Representative Authorities were created for Whites, Coloureds, Ovambos, Kavangos, Lozi, Damaras, Namas, Tswanas, and Herero. A similar body had been established for Rehoboth Basters by the Rehoboth Self-Determination Act, 1976. An advisory council was established for San Bushmen in 1986. No representative body was established for Himbas.

==== Tier three: Local authorities ====
Local authorities formed the lowest tier of governance in South West Africa. Previously established local government bodies would continue to exist and new ones could be formed. In urban areas, the local authority would be an elected local council. In rural areas where local governance structures was based on traditional customary law, the relevant Representative Authority could support their further development.

=== Transition to independence (1989–1990) ===
The three-tier system of governance was suspended on 28 February 1989 following the signing of a peace agreement the previous year. As stipulated by United Nations Security Council Resolution 435, a United Nations Transition Assistance Group (UNTAG) was deployed on 1 April 1989. Elections to a Constituent Assembly were held in November 1989 and the territory became independent as the Republic of Namibia on 21 March 1990. Walvis Bay and the Penguin Islands remained under South African control until 1994.

== See also ==
- History of Namibia
- List of colonial governors of South West Africa
- 1971–72 Namibian contract workers strike
- South West African People's Organisation (SWAPO)
- South West African Territorial Force (SWATF)
- South West African Police (SWAPOL)
- South African Border War
