= List of members of the Senate (Haiti) =

The following is a list of members of the Senate of Haiti.

== List ==
=== 1806-1964 ===
Name	District	Date elected/appointed	Term ended	Term	Notes
Alexandre Pétion	Port-au-Prince	28 December 1806	28 December 1815	1st (Provisional)	appointed to 9-year term; elected by the Senate as President of Haiti 9 March 1807
Charles Lys	Port-au-Prince	28 December 1806	28 December 1815	1st (Provisional)	appointed to 9-year term
Etienne Elie Gérin	Anse-à-Veau	28 December 1806	28 December 1815	1st (Provisional)	appointed to 9-year term
Ignace Fresnel	Port-au-Prince	28 December 1806	28 December 1815	1st (Provisional), 2nd	appointed to 9-year term; re-elected on 22 February 1827
Ignace Fresnel	Port-au-Prince	22 February 1827		1st (Provisional), 2nd	appointed to 9-year term; re-elected on 22 February 1827
Gabriel David-Troy	Port-au-Prince	28 December 1806	28 December 1815	1st (Provisional)	appointed to 9-year term
Lamothe Aigron	Cap-Haïtien	28 December 1806	28 December 1815	1st (Provisional)	appointed to 9-year term
César Thélémaque	Cap-Haïtien	28 December 1806	28 December 1812	1st (Provisional)	appointed to 6-year term; elected senate president on 31 December 1806, appointed to 6-year term
Jean-Louis Barlatier	Mirebalais	28 December 1806	28 December 1812	1st (Provisional)	appointed to 6-year term
Jn-Louis Despas Médina	Cayes	28 December 1806	28 December 1812	1st (Provisional)	appointed to 6-year term
Magloire Ambroise	Jacmel	28 December 1806	28 December 1812	1st (Provisional)	appointed to 6-year term
Pierre Timothé, (Aubert)	Port-de-Paix	28 December 1806	March 4, 1807	1st (Provisional)	appointed to 6-year term; took the oath of office, but later joined the rebels. Replaced separately by Jean-Auguste Voltaire on March 4, 1807.
Bruno Blanchet jeune	Port-au-Prince	28 December 1806	28 December 1812	1st (Provisional)	appointed to 6-year term
Louis Auguste Daumec	Port-au-Prince	28 December 1806	28 December 1809	1st (Provisional), 2nd	appointed to 3-year term; did not accept re-appointment in 1815, re-elected 3 February 1825
Louis Auguste Daumec	Port-au-Prince	3 February 1825	3 February 1834	1st (Provisional), 2nd	appointed to 3-year term; did not accept re-appointment in 1815, re-elected 3 February 1825
Théodat Trichet	Cayes	28 December 1806	28 December 1809	1st (Provisional)	appointed to 3-year term
Charles Daguilh	Cayes	28 December 1806	28 December 1809	1st (Provisional)	appointed to 3-year term
Félix Ferrier	Cap-Haïtien	28 December 1806	28 December 1809	1st (Provisional)	appointed to 3-year term
Guy Joseph Bonnet	Port-au-Prince	28 December 1806	28 December 1809	1st (Provisional)	appointed to 3-year term
Jean-Louis Guillaume Manigat	Fort-Dauphin	28 December 1806	28 December 1809	1st (Provisional)	appointed to 3-year term
Jean Simon	Saint-Marc	28 December 1806	28 December 1809	1st (Provisional)	appointed to 3-year term
Yayou	Port-au-Prince	28 December 1806	28 December 1809	1st (Provisional)	appointed to 3-year term
Pélage Varein	Gonaïves	March 4, 1807		1st (Provisional)	
Jean-Louis Larose	Port-au-Prince	March 4, 1807		1st (Provisional), 1st	re-elected 28 February 1817
Jean-Louis Larose	Port-au-Prince	28 February 1817		1st (Provisional), 1st	re-elected 28 February 1817
Philippe Bourjolly-Modé	Jacmel	March 4, 1807		1st (Provisional)	
Louis Leroux	Port-au-Prince	March 30, 1807		1st (Provisional)	
Jean-Auguste Voltaire	Cayes	March 4, 1807		1st (Provisional)	
Joseph Neptune	Port-au-Prince	March 30, 1807		1st (Provisional)	
André Auguste Borno Lamarre	Port-au-Prince	21 March 1808		1st (Provisional)	
Jean-Baptiste Delaunay	Miragoâne	4 May 1808		1st (Provisional)	
Casimir Célestin Panayoty	Port-au-Prince	5 December 1815		1st (Provisional)	
Jean-Baptiste Bayard	Jacmel	5 December 1815		1st (Provisional)	
Antoine Gédéon	Port-au-Prince	5 December 1815		1st (Provisional)	
Etienne Célestin Obas	Port-au-Prince	5 December 1815		1st (Provisional)	
Jean Augustin Hogu	Port-au-Prince	5 December 1815		1st (Provisional)	
Hilaire Martin	Jacmel	5 December 1815		1st (Provisional)	
Paul Romain	?	28 December 1806		1st (Provisional)	never took office, joined Christophe's rebellion.
Toussaint-Brave	?	28 December 1806		1st (Provisional)	never took office, joined Christophe's rebellion.
Étienne Magny	?	28 December 1806		1st (Provisional)	never took office, joined Christophe's rebellion.
Charéron	?	28 December 1806		1st (Provisional)	never took office, joined Christophe's rebellion.
Montbrun	?	March 4, 1807		1st (Provisional)	appointed by Pétion, but turned down the appointment. Replaced by Leroux
Jean-Pierre Boyer		5 December 1815		1st	did not accept appointment in 1815
Frédéric		5 December 1815		1st	did not accept appointment in 1815
J.-F. Lespinasse		5 December 1815		1st	did not accept appointment in 1815
Noël Viallet		28 April 1817	28 April 1826	1st, 2nd	
Antoine Lerebours		24 September 1821	24 September 1830	1st, 2nd	
Pierre-Prosper Rouanez (Romanez)	Port-au-Prince	8 February 1825	8 February 1834	2nd, 3rd	
François Sambour	Cayes	26 January 1825	26 January 1834	2nd, 3rd	
Pierre François Birot	Port-au-Prince	23 July 1822		2nd, 3rd	
Jean Rigolet,	St. Marc	23 July 1822		2nd, 3rd	
Eliacin Dupuche	Port-au-Prince	21 October 1822	21 October 1831	2nd, 3rd	
Coquière Dupiton	Port-au-Prince	28 October 1822	28 October 1831	2nd, 3rd	
Joseph Pitre jeune	Port-au-Prince	14 April 1824	14 April 1833	2nd, 3rd, 4th	
Antoine Martinez Valdès,	Santo-Domingo	28 June 1824	28 June 1833	2nd, 3rd, 4th	
Desrivières Chanlatte	Port-au-Prince	14 January 1825	14 January 1834	2nd, 3rd, 4th	
Dévalions	Léogâne	24 January 1825	24 January 1834	2nd, 3rd, 4th	
Jean-Louis Lafontant père	Jacmel	31 January 1825	31 January 1834	2nd, 3rd, 4th	
Fonroë Dubreuil	Cayes	13 January 1826	13 January 1835	2nd, 3rd, 4th	
Jean-François Lespinasse	Port-au-Prince	20 January 1826	20 January 1835	2nd, 3rd, 4th	
Louis Gabriel Audigé	Port-au-Prince	26 February 1826	26 February 1835	2nd, 3rd, 4th	
Jean Colin Castor	Port-au-Prince	21 April 1826	21 April 1835	2nd, 3rd, 4th	
Jacques Hyppolyte Laroche	Port-au-Prince	24 April 1826	24 April 1835	2nd, 3rd, 4th	
Charles Théodore Cupidon	Port-au-Prince	14 February 1827	14 February 1836	2nd, 3rd, 4th	
Fleuran Chevalier	Petit-Trou	6 August 1828	1837	3rd, 4th	
Gilles Bénèche	Baradères	11 August 1828	1837	3rd, 4th	
Marie Eth. Eustache Frémont	Port-au-Prince	4 September 1830	1839	3rd, 4th	
Noël Piron	Port-au-Prince	4 September 1830	1839	3rd, 4th	
Philippe Laraque	Jérémie	4 September 1830	1839	3rd, 4th	
Glésil	Cayes	25 September 1830	1839	3rd, 4th	
Louis Rigaud	Port-au-Prince	10 October 1830	1839	3rd, 4th	
Lochard aîné	Miragoâne	12 October 1830	1839	3rd, 4th	
Jean Béchet	Port-au-Prince	17 October 1830	1839	3rd, 4th	
Jn. Jh. Dieudonné	Port-au-Prince	18 October 1830	1839	3rd, 4th	
François Domingue Labbée	Cayes	26 October 1830	1839	3rd, 4th	
Joseph Georges	Port-au-Prince	8 December 1830	1839	3rd, 4th	
Louis Alin	Port-de-Paix	6 June 1832	1841	4th, 5th	
Antoine Paret	Jérémie	3 July 1833	1842	4th, 5th	
Alexis Beaubrun Ardouin	Port-au-Prince	17 July 1833	1842	4th, 5th	later appointed to the Council of State
Alexis Beaubrun Ardouin	Port-au-Prince	22 March 1846		Council of State	
Pierre André	Port-au-Prince	22 July 1833	1842	4th, 5th	
Jean Pierre Oriol	Port-au-Prince	16 April 1834		4th, 5th	
Désiré Maillard,	Jacmel	5 May 1834		4th, 5th	
José Joaquim Delmonte,	Santo-Domingo	21 May 1834		4th, 5th	
Joseph Noël,	Cap-Haïtien	23 May 1834		4th, 5th	
Emérand Lafontant	Port-au-Prince	30 May 1834		4th, 5th	
Charles Bàzelais	Port-au-Prince	4 June 1835		4th, 5th	
Pierre Louis Bouzi	Port-au-Prince	5 June 1835		4th, 5th	
Thomas Madiou	Port-au-Prince	19 September 1836		4th, 5th	
Jh. Guillaume Longchamp	Cayes	21 September 1836		4th, 5th	
Louis Lézeaux jeune, Aquin	Aquin	5 October 1836		4th, 5th	
Jean-Jacques Sully, Cayes	Cayes	19 October 1836		4th, 5th	
Jean-Claude Michel jeune	Jacmel	20 April 1838	1847	5th, 6th	
Rozier Decossard	Jérémie	2 May 1838	1847	5th, 6th	
Jérôme Chardavoine	Cayes	4 September 1839	1847	5th, 6th	
Tassy aîné	Cap-Haïtien	7 October 1839	1847	5th, 6th	
Calice Bonneau	Port-au-Prince	11 October 1839	1847	5th, 6th	
Philippe César	Grand Goâve	14 October 1839	1847	5th, 6th	
Gabriel Dallon	Arcahaie	16 October 1839	1847	5th, 6th	
Guillaume Chegaraye	Cayes	23 October 1839		5th, 6th	
Alexandre Bouchereau	Port-au-Prince	18 April 1840		5th, 6th	
Pierre Bineau	Anse-à-Veau	17 June 1840		5th, 6th	
Michel Charles jeune	Mirebalais	26 July 1841		5th, 6th	
Héraux aîné	Cap-Haïtien	26 July 1841		5th, 6th	
Jean Daguerre, Port-au-Prince	Port-au-Prince	20 April 1843		6th	
Lunley Ch. Cerisier	Port-au-Prince	20 April 1843		6th	
Jean-Paul	Port-au-Prince	4 May 1843		6th, 7th	re-elected 1847
Jean-Paul	Port-au-Prince	1847		6th, 7th	re-elected 1847
Louis Séguy Vilvaleix aîné	Port-au-Prince	4 May 1843		6th	
Paul Emile Berthonieux	Port-au-Prince	13 June 1843		6th	
Jean Michel Corvoisier	Gonaïves	15 June 1843		6th	
Jean Bénis	Petit-Goâve	15 June 1843		6th	
David Troy	Port-au-Prince	13 January 1845		Council of State	
Joseph Courtois	Port-au-Prince	13 January 1845		Council of State	
Noël Piron	Port-au-Prince	13 January 1845		Council of State	
Jean-Julien Dasny Labonté	Port-au-Prince	13 January 1845		Council of State	
	Port-au-Prince	10 August 1855		8th, 9th, 10th	re-elected
Auguste Elie	Port-au-Prince	13 January 1845		Council of State	
Joseph François	Jacmel	13 January 1845		Council of State	
André Jean-Simon	Miragoâne	13 January 1845		Council of State	
Cinus Marion aîné	Cayes	13 January 1845		Council of State	
Jean Joseph Rameau père	Cayes	13 January 1845		Council of State	
Salomon père	Cayes	13 January 1845		Council of State	
Philibert Laraque	Jérémie	13 January 1845		Council of State	
Jean-Baptiste Dupuy	Gonaïves	13 January 1845		Council of State	
François Genty	Cap-Haïtien	13 January 1845		Council of State	
Nemours Pierre-Louis	Cap-Haïtien	13 January 1845		Council of State	re-elected 2 May 1846
Belonière Petionny	Cap-Haïtien	13 January 1845		Council of State	
Cerres et Valcin Gaudin	Gonaïves	22 February 1845		Council of State	
Louis Hector	Borgne	22 February 1845		Council of State	re-elected 20 July 1858
Louis Hector	Borgne	20 July 1858		9th	
Nicolas Célestin, Lapointe	Saint-Marc	22 February 1845		Council of State	
François Lacruz	Cap-Haïtien	22 February 1845		Council of State	re-elected 10 November 1855
François Lacruz	Cap-Haïtien	10 November 1855		8th	re-elected 10 November 1855
Céligny Ardouin	Port-au-Prince	16 April 1845		Council of State	
Hilaire Jean-Pierre	Cap-Haïtien	16 May 1845	1847	Council of State	re-elected 13 October 1849 and 13 October 1857
Hilaire Jean-Pierre	Cap-Haïtien	13 October 1849		7th, 8th	re-elected 13 October 1849 and 13 October 1857
Pierre François Toussaint	Port-au-Prince	1 August 1845	1847	Council of State	re-elected 16 September 1849 and 20 July 1858
Pierre François Toussaint	Port-au-Prince	16 September 1849		7th, 8th	re-elected 16 September 1849 and 20 July 1858
Applys fils	Port-de-Paix	1 August 1845		Council of State	
Fils-Aimé Obas	Limbe	1 August 1845		Council of State	
François Balmire	Jérémie	1 March 1846		Council of State	
Turenne Guerrier	Saint-Marc	1 March 1846		Council of State	
Jn. -Louis Nicolas fils	Cayes	1 March 1846	1847	Council of State	re-elected 25 August 1855
Jn. -Louis Nicolas fils	Cayes	25 August 1855		8th	re-elected 25 August 1855
Numa Paret	Jérémie	1 March 1846		Council of State	
Alexandre Bouchereau	Port-au-Prince	1 March 1846		Council of State	
Chancy Ducayette	Port-au-Prince	1 March 1846		Council of State	
Cauvin aîné	Port-au-Prince	1 March 1846		Council of State	
Philippeaux fils	Petit-Trou	16 March 1846		Council of State	
Paul	Saint-Marc	16 March 1846		Council of State	
Guerrier Prophète	Trou, (Nord).	16 March 1846		Council of State	
Maximilien Zamor	Port-au-Prince	22 March 1846		Council of State	
Jean-Paul	Port-au-Prince	22 March 1846	6 April 1847	Council of State	re-elected 6 April 1847
		6 April 1847		7th	
Antoine François Bance père	Port-au-Prince	22 March 1846		Council of State	
Aplys père	Cap-Haïtien	22 March 1846		Council of State	
Victorin Plésance	Port-au-Prince	9 June 1846		Council of State	re-elected 10 November 1855
Damien Delva	Port-au-Prince	20 June 1846		Council of State	
Jean Michel	?	20 June 1846		Council of State	
J. Corvoisier	Gonaïves	11 July 1846		Council of State	
Salomon jeune	Cayes	11 July 1846		Council of State	
François Capois	Port-de-Paix	13 September 1846		Council of State	12 November 1856
Ls. de Gonzague Latortue	Cap-Haïtien	16 October 1846		Council of State	
Edouard Hall	Cayes	16 October 1846		Council of State	
Thermidor Jean-Bart	Cayes	16 October 1846		Council of State	
Détré	Port-au-Prince	17 March 1847	1856	7th	
Casimir Jean-Baptiste	Port-au-Prince	15 November 1847	1865	7th, 8th, 9th	re-elected 8 July 1856
Alphonse Larochel	Port-au-Prince	15 November 1847	1865	7th, 8th, 9th	re-elected 8 July 1856
Duverno Trouillot	Port-au-Prince	15 November 1847	1865	7th, 8th, 9th	re-elected 8 July 1856
Désormes Ls. Lafontant	Port-au-Prince	13 October 1848	1866	7th, 8th, 9th	re-elected 13 October 1857
Jean-Baptiste Alerte	Léogane	13 October 1848	1857	7th	
Jean Michel Duval	Port-au-Prince	13 October 1848	1866	7th, 8th, 9th	re-elected 13 October 1857
Hippolite Lucas	Port-au-Prince	13 October 1848	1866	7th, 8th, 9th	re-elected 13 October 1857
Jean-Baptiste Pernier	Croix des Bouquets	13 October 1848	1866	7th, 8th, 9th	re-elected 13 October 1857
Clervaux Lavache	Port-au-Prince	13 October 1848	1857	7th	
Saladin Lamour	Port-au-Prince	13 October 1848	1866	7th, 8th, 9th	re-elected 13 October 1857 and 10 March 1870
		10 March 1870	1876	13th	
François Sévère	Cap-Haïtien	13 October 1848	1857	7th	
Michel Roche	Jacmel	13 October 1848	1857	7th	
Chéry Alcindor	Jérémie	13 October 1848	1866	7th, 8th, 9th	re-elected 13 October 1857
Zamor père	Gonaïves	13 October 1848	1866	7th, 8th, 9th	re-elected 20 July 1857
Julien Mathon	Cap-Haïtien	13 October 1848	1857	7th	
Lévçillé aîné	Cayes	13 October 1848	1857	7th	
Edouard Etienne	Ouanaminthe	18 June 1852		8th	
Jean- Joseph Dieudonné	Port-au-Prince	18 June 1852		8th	
Jean-Louis Hippolite	Port-au-Prince	18 June 1852		8th	
Louis Doizé, Pouponneau	Petit-Trou des Baradères	18 December 1852		8th	
Célestin Balier	Port-au-Prince	18 December 1852		8th	
Sulïren Mirault	St. -Marc	18 December 1852		8th	
Pierre Santhonax	Cap-Haïtien	18 December 1852		8th	
Gustave Apollon	Cayes	18 December 1852		8th	
Myrtil La tortue	Gonaïves	24 December 1853		8th	
Joseph Eyssalenne	Croix-des-Bouquets	24 December 1853		8th	
François Lacruz	Cap-Haïtien	10 August 1855		8th, 9th, 10th	re-elected
J. J. Dasny Labonté	Port-au-Prince	10 August 1855		8th, 9th, 10th	re-elected
Pierre Abraham	Port-au-Prince	10 August 1855		8th, 9th, 10th	re-elected
Dérival Lévêque	Petit-Goâve	10 August 1855		8th	
Jn.-Louis Nicolas fils	Cayes	25 August 1856		8th, 9th, 10th, 11th	re-elected
Casimir Jn.-Baptiste	Port-au-Prince	8 July 1856		8th, 9th, 10th, 11th	re-elected
D. Trouillot	Port-au-Prince	8 July 1856		8th, 9th, 10th, 11th	
Louis Masson	Léogâne	8 July 1856		8th, 9th, 10th, 11th	
François Acloque	Port-au-Prince	8 July 1856		8th, 9th, 10th, 11th	
Pierre-Louis, Carriès	Jacmel	8 July 1856		8th, 9th, 10th, 11th	
Brutus Jean-Simon	Port-au-Prince	8 July 1856		8th, 9th, 10th, 11th	
Jean-Baptiste Nicolas	St. -Marc	8 July 1856		8th, 9th, 10th, 11th	
Surville Toussaint	Port-au-Prince	19 April 1859		9th, 10th, 11th, 12th	re-elected
Balthazar Ingignac	Port-au-Prince	19 April 1859		9th, 10th, 11th, 12th	
Théiismon Bouchereau	Port-au-Prince	19 April 1859		9th, 10th, 11th, 12th	
Jean Evangéliste Célestin	Gonaïves	19 April 1859		9th, 10th, 11th, 12th	
René Lavelanet	Port-au-Prince	19 April 1859		9th, 10th, 11th, 12th	
J. H. Cayemitte	Jérémie	19 April 1859		9th, 10th, 11th, 12th	
Jn. Alphonse, Mirambeau	Port-au-Prince	19 April 1859		9th, 10th, 11th, 12th	
Joseph Lamothe	Port-au-Prince	19 April 1859		9th, 10th, 11th, 12th	
Sylvestre Jacques	Borgne	19 April 1859		9th, 10th, 11th, 12th	
Guillaume André	St.-Marc	19 April 1859		9th, 10th, 11th, 12th	
José Ignacio Mendoza	Gonaïves	19 April 1859		9th, 10th, 11th, 12th	
Théophile Adrien Blanchet	Jérémie	19 April 1859		9th, 10th, 11th, 12th	
Antoine Laforest	Port-au-Prince	19 September 1860		9th, 10th, 11th, 12th	
F. S. Faubert	Port-au-Prince	19 September 1860		9th, 10th, 11th, 12th	
Thimagène Rameau	Port-au-Prince	19 September 1860		9th, 10th, 11th, 12th	
r. B. Lavaud	Jérémie	28 December 1860		9th, 10th, 11th, 12th	
Fénelon Buteau	Port-au-Prince	14 July 1862	1873	10th, 11th, 12th	
Félix Box	Cap-Haïtien	14 July 1862	1873	10th, 11th, 12th	
Jean Pierre Dauphin	Gonaïves	14 July 1862	1873	10th, 11th, 12th	
Félix Poisson	Petit-Goâve	14 July 1862	1873	10th, 11th, 12th	
Placide David	Port-au-Prince	5 August 1864			
Bruno Blanchet	Cayes	5 August 1864			
Joseph Armand	Port-au-Prince	5 August 1864			
Phanor Dupin	Milot	5 August 1864			
Alexandre Madiou	Port-au-Prince	5 August 1864			
Jn.-Baptiste Dupuy	Gonaïves	5 August 1864			re-elected
Heureau aîné	Cap-Haïtien	5 August 1864			
Antoine Larose	Port-au-Prince	5 August 1864			
Exilien Heurtelou	Port-au-Prince	19 July 1865			
Antoine Bernard, Thomas Madiou	Port-au-Prince	19 July 1865			
Charles Antoine Preston	Port-au-Prince	19 July 1865			
Léveillé	Cayes	19 July 1865			re-elected
Valmé Lizaire	Jérémie	23 July 1866			
Azor	Petite Rivière-deNippes	23 July 1866			
Dassas Sévère	Trou	23 July 1866			
Volmar Laporte	Port-au-Prince	23 July 1866			
Pierre Louis Coicou	Port-au-Prince	23 July 1866			
Auguste Nau	Port-au-Prince	23 July 1866			
E. Lauture	Jacmel	23 July 1866			
Philippeaux	Petit-Trou	21 August 1866			
Auguste Elie	Port-au-Prince	21 August 1866			
Alexandre Carrié	Port-au-Prince	8 September 1866			
Jacques Thébaud	Jacmel	4 September 1867			
Edmond Lauture	Jacmel	4 September 1867			
Salien	St.-Louis du Sud	4 September 1867			
Montmorency Benjamin	Mirebalais	4 September 1867			
J. F. S. Victor	Port-au-Prince	5 September 1867			
Hyppolite aîné	Cap-Haïtien	5 September 1867			
Dagueaseau Lespinasse	Port-au-Prince	5 September 1867			
Alphonse Henriquez	Port-de-Paix	5 September 1867			
P. A. Florent	Gonaïves	5 September 1867			
Alvinzi Clément	Cap-Haïtien	5 September 1867			
Guerrier Prophète	?	5 September 1867			
Volmar Laporte	Port-au-Prince	5 September 1867			re-elected
Louis Gauthier	Cap-Haïtien	5 September 1867			
Dupont jeune	Cayes	5 September 1867			
J. Cassius Daniel	Cap-Haïtien	5 September 1867			
Numa Rameau	Cayes	5 September 1867			
Joubert	Gonaïves	5 September 1867			
Jn.-Pierre Dauphin	Gonaïves	5 September 1867			
Etienne St. -Aude	Port-de-Paix	5 September 1867			re-elected 10 March 1870
Pierre François Toussaint	Port-au-Prince	5 September 1867			
Lauriston Kernizan	Léogâne	5 September 1867			
Pierre Félix Cadet	Limbe	5 September 1867			
Dominique Benoit	St.-Michel de l'Attalaye	5 September 1867			
Lechaud père	Port-au-Prince	5 September 1867			
Pierre Momplaisir Pierre	Anse-à-Veau	8 March 1870			
Mégie aîné	Jacmel	8 March 1870			
Lissade	Léogâne	10 March 1870			
Samuel Dupré	Lascahobas	10 March 1870			
Désilus Lamour	Jacmel	10 March 1870			
Samson Antoine	Acul-du-Nord	10 March 1870			
Antoine Norbert Gâteau	Port-au-Prince	10 March 1870			
Fabre jeune (Fabien)	Cayes	10 March 1870			
Gonzalve Labanette	Hinche	10 March 1870			
Debout aîné	Aquin	10 March 1870			
St.-Louis Alexandre	PetiteRivière-de-l'Artibonite	10 March 1870			
Polémon Lorquet	Port-au-Prince	10 March 1870			
Marcel père	Jérémie	10 March 1870			
Albert Boucant	Port-de-Paix	10 March 1870			
Fils-Aimé Alexis	St.-Marc	10 March 1870			
Pierre Louis Toussaint	Limbe	15 March 1870			
Dominique Hilaire	St.Louis du Nord	15 March 1870			
Alexandre Benjamin	Port-au-Prince	15 March 1870			
Henry Théodore Granville	Port-au-Prince	15 March 1870			
Pierre Alexis Lageroy	Anse-à-Veau	15 March 1870			
Eugène Bourjolly	Port-au-Prince	15 March 1870			
Cauvin	Port-au-Prince	15 March 1870			re-elected
Furay V, Herne	Cayes	15 March 1870			
John Lynch	Port-au-Prince	17 August 1870			
Jeantel Manigat	Cap-Haïtien	17 August 1870			
Colbert Lochard	Port-au-Prince	17 August 1870			
Boisrond Canal	Port-au-Prince	17 August 1870			
Alfred Ménard	Cap-Haïtien	3 May 1871			
Altidor Noël	Port-au-Prince	3 May 1871			
Duvivier	Cap-Haïtien	3 May 1871			
Picare Niclaise	Cayes	7 July 1871			
Picare Niclaise	Cayes	1875			
F. Faubert	Port-au-Prince	17 August 1871			
P. Momplaisir Pierre	Port-au-Prince	17 August 1871			re-elected
Auguste Montas	Port-au-Prince	17 August 1871			
Volcé Pierre Louis	JeanRabel	17 August 1871			
Aristide Flambert	Jacmel	17 August 1871			
William Chanlatte	Jacmel	17 August 1871			
Montmorency Daguerre	Port-au-Prince	17 August 1871			
A. Rouzier	Jérémie	17 August 1871			
Symphor François	Môle St.-Nicolas	17 August 1871			
Ferrus	Petit Goâve	18 August 181			
A. Dupiton	Petite Rivière de l'Artibonite	1873			
Dupont	Cayes	11 August 1873			
A. Ménard	Cap-Haïtien	11 August 1873			
J. B. Damier	Port-au-Prince	11 August 1873			
\. Duval	Port-au-Prince	11 August 1873			
St. Léger Pierre Jean-Louis	Jérémie	11 August 1873			
Boisrond Canal	Port-au-Prince	5 September 1873			
Louis Auguste	Port-dePaix	5 September 1873			
Darius Denis	Port-au-Prince	5 September 1873			
Pyrrhus Michel	Grande-Rivièredu-Nord	5 September 1873			
Magny fils	Cap-Haïtien	5 September 1873			
Général Cauvin	Port-au-Prince	1875			
Jh. Armand	Port-au-Prince	1875			
J. J. Audain	Port-au-Prince	1875			
F. GeflErard	Gonaïves	1875			
F. Poitevien	Port-dePaix	1875			
G. Prophète	Port-au-Prince	1875			
Pre. Niclaise	Cayes	1875			re-elected
Numa Rameau	Cayes	1875			
Th. Paret	Jérémie	1875			
A. Débrosse	Baradères	1875			
H. Hérissé	St.-Marc	1875			
Ssmson Antoine	Acul-du-Nord	1875			
Lovinsky Isidor	Cap-Haïtien	1875			
Drouillard Meyers	Anse-à-Veau	1875			
O. Henry	Jérémie	1875			
Fabre jeune	Cayes	1875			
A. Boucan	Port-dePaix	1875			
Ph. Noël	Port-au-Prince	1875			
St.-Louis Alexandre	St.-Marc	1875			
Lazarre Bastien	Port-dePaix	1875			
D. Labonté	Port-au-Prince	1875			
C. Ségur	Port-au-Prince	1875			
Chavannes	Cap-Haïtien	1875			
L. J. Adam	Port-au-Prince	1875			
A. Fontaine	Cap-Haïtien	1875			
J. B. M Gnillet	MôleSt- Nicolas	1875			
Jh Armand	Port-au-Prince	1875			
S. Liautaud	Port-au-Prince	1875			
H. Baille	Gonaïves	1875			
E. Berret	Cayes	1875			
P. Alcindor	Anse-d'Hainault	1875			
A. Fougère	Cayes	1876			
D. Lamour	Jacmel	1876			
A. Rouzier	Jérémie	1876			
S. Léger Pre. Jn-Louis	Jérémie	1876			re-elected
Mouras	Cayes	1876			
Océan Joseph	Léogâne	1876			
François Hyppolite	Jérémie	1876			
Dartiguenave	Jacmel	1876			
Louis Audain	Port-au-Prince	1876			
Magny	Cap-Haïtien	1876			re-elected
M. Alexis	Gonaïves	1876			
D. Denis	Port-au-Prince	1876			
L. T. Lafontant	Jacmel	1876			
A, F. Duvivier	Grande-Saline	1876			
Richard Azor	Port-au-Prince	1876			
D. Pichardo	Hinche	1876			
A. Flambert	Jacmel	1876			
Jh. Baille	Gonaïves	1876			re-elected
Pre. Ethéart	Port-au-Prince	1876			
Symphor François	MôleSt- Nicolas	1876			
Brutus Casimir	Petite-Rivière de l'Artibonite	1876			
Dr. Jn. Joseph	Cap-Haïtien	1876			
B. Maignan	Anse-à-Veau	1876			
F. Dupuy	Cap-Haïtien	1876			
M. Montasse	Port-au-Prince	1876			
Arétus Duval	Port-au-Prince	1876			
Ferrus	Petit-Goâve	1876			
Pelage Qaude	Jacmel	1876			
Laërte Charles Pierre	Fort-Liberté	1876			
Choute Narcisse	St. Marc	1876			
Loyer Bareau	Port-au-Prince	1er September 1876			
A. Dupiton	St. Marc	1er September 1876			re-elected
1878: D. Lamour, Jacmel, réélu; François Hyppolite, Jérémie; Louis Auidain, Port-au-Prince, réélu; A. Thoby, St.-Marc; St. Léger Pre. Jn. Louis, Jérémie, réélu: E. Laroche, Cap-Haïtien; St.-Martin Dupuy, Cap-Haïtien; Falaiseau Cadet, Petit Goâve; Lalaguë fils, Aquin; Sylla Guignard, Port-au-Prince.					
May 1879: G. Prophète, Port-au-Prince. — 22 October: Buteau père, Cayes; Innocent Michel Pierre, Borgne; Desvallon jeune, Port-de-Paix; C. Auguste Laurent, Limbe; Désinor St.-Louis Alexandre, St.-Marc; Gaétan père, Coteaux; C. Kerlegrand, Jérémie; Marius Jean Simon, Miragoâne.					
1880: L. J. Adam, Port-au-Prince; Télus Lafontant, Port-au-Prince; Mompoint jeune, Cap-Haïtien: Hyppolitte (Gelin), Cap-Haïtien; T. Suire, Cavaillon; François Joseph, Port-au-Prince; Ed. Pinckombe, Port-au-Prince; Jn. -Charles Alexandre, Terre-Neuve; Surpris Laurent, St. -Marc; C. Océan Ulysse, Port-au-Prince; J, C. Kerlegrand, Jérémie, réélu.					
Albert Boucan	Port-de-Paix	17 June 1881			
21 June 1882: Laërte Charles Pierre, Fort-Liberté, réélu; Aimable Vilaire Cabêche, Gonaïves; Ed. Jn.-François, Plaine-du-Nord; N. Bottex, Cap-Haëtien; Jautel Manigat, Cap-Haïtien; N. Pierre-Louis aîné, Jean Rabel; Louis Auguste, Port-de-Paix; Montasse, Port-au-Prince; S. M. Marcelin, Port-au-Prince; T. Riboul, Port-au-Prince; Emile Pierre, Cayes; 18 September.					
A. Lindor	Port-au-Prince	22 Février 1883			
Badère	Port-au-Prince	13 July 1883			
B. Maignan	Anse-à-Veau	13 July 1883			re-elected
June 1884: Symphor François, Môle St.-Nicolas, réélu; Ségur Gentil, Port-au-Prince; F. D. Légitime, Port-au-Prince; Samson, Cap-Haïtien; Sénèque Pierre, Anse-à-Veau; Chenier Rigaud, Tiburon; N. Léger, Cayes; O. Cameau, St. Marc; Désinor St.-Louis Alexandre, St. -Marc; réélu.	Môle St.-Nicolas	June 1884			re-elected
Métellus Ménard	Donidon	2 July 1885			
Joseph Dessources	Borgne	2 July 1885			
14 Alai 1886: St.-Cap Ls. Blot, Cap-Haïtien; Dr. Atibry, Jacmel; A. Bréa, Hinche; C. Fouchard, Jérémie; Brutus St.-Victor, Port-au-Prince; M. Zéphir, Port-au-Prince, Hyppolite, Cap-Haïtien, réélu; J. P. Lafontant, Port-au-Prince, réélu; A. V. Cabêche, Gonaïves, réélu; B. Maignan, Anse-à-Veau, réélu. — 18 August: Moléus Germain, Port-au-Prince.					
18 July 1887: Etienne St.- Aude, Port-de-Paix.					
13 June 1888: Métellus Ménard, Dondon, réélu; Jules St.-Macary, Port-au-Prince; T. A. S. Sam, Cap-Haïtien; Nemours Pierre-Louis aîné, Jean- Rabel, réélu; Stewart, Cap-Haïtien, réélu; Joseph Dessources, Borgne, réélu; Badère, Port-au-Prince, réélu; M. Ménard, Dondon, réélu; Emile Pierre, Cayes, réélu; M. Montas, Port-au-Prince, réélu; D. Théodore, Ouanaminthe; T. Riboul, réélu.					
1890: Docteur M. Aubry, Port-au-Prince, réélu; T. Chalviré, Cayes; St.-Lucien Hector, Cap-Haïtien; Ovide Cameau, St. -Marc, réélu; Désinor St.-Louis Alexandre, St.-Marc, réélu; M. Montasse, Port-au-Prince, réélu; L. Barau, Port-au-Prince, réélu; Evariste Laroche, Cap-Haïtien, réélu; Dulciné Jean-Louis, Jacmel; J. P. Lafontant, Port-au-Prince, réélu; C. Archin, Port-au-Prince; Laërtre Charles Pierre, Fort-Liberté, réélu; Adin Boissonnière, Léogâne; Smith Duplessy, Port-au-Prince; C. W. Carvalho, Cap-Haïtien; Cadestin Robert, Jérémie; Mont-Morency Benjamin, Port-au-Prince; Cadieu Hibbert, Mîragoâne; Numa Tabuteau, Baradères; A. Roland, Jérémie; B. Maignan, Anse-à-Veau, réélu; Béliard jeune, Cap-Haïtien; S. Ultimo St.-Amand, Gonaïves; A. Dupiton, St.-Marc, réélu; Sidoine Thébaud, Gonaïves; C. Barbot, Gonaïves; Etienne St.-Aude, Port-de-Paix, réélu; Rosinky Jn-Joseph, Cap-Haïtien; Léonce Lubin, Cayes; Deslandes, Coteaux; Louis Auguste, Cayes, réélu; S. Dubuisson fils, Lascahobas; R. Samson, Cap-Haïtien, réélu; D, Lamour, Trou; Nemours Pre. Louis aîné, Jean-Rabel, réélu; Alfred William, Port-de-Paix; J. B. M. Guillet, Môle St.-Nicolas; réélu; D. Gentil, Cap-Haïtien; Edmond Paul, Jacmel; T. A. S. Sam, Cap-Haïtien, réélu; Nelson Louis, Saint-Louis-du-Nord.					
June 1891: Louis Thimogène Lafontant, Jacmel, réélu; Dr. Tacite Lamothe, Port-au-Prince; V. Kither Domnd, Jacmel; Plésance, Portau-Prince; Valcindor Hippolyte, Port-au-Prince.					
18 May 1892: Fontange Chevalier, Port-au-Prince; G. Guilbert Grand-Goâve; Jn. -Alerte, Port-au-Prince; S. M. Pierre, Port-au-Prince, réélu; Edmond Paul, Port-au-Prince, réélu; Ney-Cayemitte, Jérémie; A. Dérac, St. -Marc; C. G. D. Vaillant, Gonaïves; .Azenoff Jn-Gilles, Hinche; D. Lézard, Cap-Haïtien; C. P, F. Bazin, Limbe; E. Laroche, Cap-Haïtien, réélu; Jn-François Pre-Loui.s, Ste-Suzanne; B. Jn. -Bernard, Cerca-la-Source; Diogène Serres, Port-de-Paix; Robert Roche, Môle St.-Nicolas; L. Bareau, Port-au-Prince, réélu.					
1893: Ovide Camçau, Poit-au-Prince, réélu; Ernest Roumain, Portau-Prince; Jh. Osson, Petit-Trou de Nippes; Ed. Montreuil, Cap-Haïtien; Jules Justin, Dame-Marie; P. E. Latortue, Gonaïves.					
1894 May: J. P. Lafontant, Port-au-Prince, réélu; Valcindor Hyppolite, Port-au-Prince, réélu; Dérémond, Petit-Goâve; Camille Molière, Port-au-Prince; 3. Dubuisson fils, Lascahobas, réélu; Nemours PierreLouis aîné, Jn.-Rabel, réélu. — 15 May: Roche aîné, Jean-Rabel; A. Malebranche, Anse-à-Veau, M. Jean-Simon, Miragoâne, réélu; Stewart, CapHaïtien, réélu; Désinor Saint-Louis Alexandre, SaintMarc, réélu; P. E. Latortue, Gonaïves, Dupiton, St.-Marc, 21 May, réélu.					
1896: Jules Justin, Petite-Rivière de Nippes, réélu; B. Maignan, Anse-à-Veau, réélu; Louis Auguste, Cayes, réélu; Cadestin Robert, Jérémie, réélu 25 et 26 April; L. Malebranche, Anse-à-Veau; Nicolas Léger, Cayes, 25 et 28 April; Dutréville Lamour, Trou, réélu; Tancrède Auguste, Cap-Haïtien; Almonor Mars, Grande Rivière du Nord; Joseph Poujol, Cap-Haïtien. — 30 April Plésance, Port-au-Prince, réélu; Thézalus Pierre Etienne, Port-au-Prince. — 5 mai : Pétion Eveillard aîné, StMarc; Souverain Jn-Jacques, Cap-Haitien. — 2 mai: Cyrille Bernateau, St.-Louis-du-Nord.					
1897: Stéphen Archer, Port-au-Prince; Rovigo Barjon, Jacmel.					
1898 May: Pierre Victor fib, Cap-Haïtien, Renaud Hippolyte, Portau-Prince; Thézalus Pierre Etienne, Port-au-Prince, réélu; M. E. Magloire, Cap-Haïtien; Fuscien Denis, Cap-Haïtien; Aurel Bayard, Portau-Prince; Diogène Délinois, Port-au-Prince; Buteau, Cayes; R. Barjon, Jacmel réélu, J. C. Arteaud, Cap-Haïtien; W. Terlonge, Port-auPrince; J. T. Salnave, Cap-Haïtien; Dr. Arch. Désert, Gonaïves; Evariste Laroche, Cap-Haïtien; Julien Dusseck, Port-au-Prince, A. Dérac, SaintMarc, réélu; St.-Far, Port-de-Paix; A. Tiphaine, Port-de-Paix; Destin St. -Louis, St.-Marc.					
1900, 14 May: Camille Molière, Port-au-Prince, réélu; S. N, Lafontant, Port-au-Prince; S. Dubuisson fils, Lascahobas, réélu; Rémy Bastien, Port-au-Prince; Labbé Barbancourt Port-au-Prince; Tertulien Guilbaud, Port-de-Paix; Lascase Delbeau, Port-de-Paix.		14 May 1900			
16 May: Destin St. Louis, St. Marc, réélu; M. Limage Philippe, Gonaïves; Estime jeune, St.-Marc; Marius Jn, Simon, Miragoâne, réélu; Léonce Lubin, Cayes, réélu; Béris Léveillé, Cap-Haïtien.		16 May 1900			
18 May: P. A. Stewart, Cap -Haïtien, réélu; Admète Malebranche, Anise-à-Veau, réélu.		18 May 1900			
1901, 17 June: Tertilus Nicolas, F. Jn.-Baptiste,					
1902, 21 April: C. Bernateau, réélu; G. Guillaume, réélu; F. Jn.Baptiste, réélu; J. C. Arteau, réélu; T. Guillaumette, W. Terlonge, réélu; P. E. Painson, réélu; P. Eveillard, réélu; A. Malebranche, réélu; D. Lamour, réélu; . Justin, réélu, M. Morisset, Prudent jeune.					
1902 : Reconstitution du Sénat après les événements du 12 mai.					
28 August: Pour le Nord; Ls, André fils.					
1er September — 3 Dec: Nord — Dr. N. Auguste, P. Béliard, M. E. Magloire, P. A. Steward, D. Théodore, P. Ménard, T. C. Laurent, V. Hilaire.					
Du 4 Dec: Nord Ouest. — S. William, A. Tiphaine, Beauvoir, T. Champagne.					
4-5 December : Artibonite. — E. Cinéas, T. A. Dupiton, R. David, Boîsrond, Salomon, Jn.-Baptiste, Lanoue Sterling.					
8-9 December: Sud. — H. Dennery, M. Morisset, Néré Numa, Ney Cayemitte, N. Sandaire, A. Malebranche, N. Bance, P. Pierre André, Jules Justin.					
Ouest. — F. Cauvin, St.-Fort Colin, J, Dussek, A. Bourjolly, S. Dennis, R. Hippolite, E. Brossard, Michel Oreste, D. Jn-Louis, M. Gaston, C. François.					
1903, 12 May': S. M. Pierre, J. R. Barjon (Ouest) 1903, 1 Juil: F. Moïse (Nord-Ouest).					
1903, 11 August: Masséus Salvador (Ouest).					
1904, 11 May: P. Pierre André, (réélu) Sud; Morisset, Sud, réélu; N. Bance, Sud, réélu; Ney Cayemitte, Sud, réélu.					
19i04, 27 May: Boisrond Canal jeune.					
1904, 27 May: Nord — 'M, E. Magloire, réélu.					
1904, 30 May: Nord: Louis André fils réélu; Vaudré Hilaire, réélu; Fuscien Denis, Dr. Déjoie Laroche. — Ouest: Julien Dussek, réélu; J. R. Barjon, réélu; Buteau.					
1904, 17 August. — Nord: Th. H. Ménard.					
1905, 19 May. — Labbé Barbancourt, (Sud).					
1905, 28 Juil. — H. Baussan, (Ouest), Calice Lerebaurs (Ouest).					
1905, 18 August. — 'Diogène Lerebours, (Ouest).					
1906, 21 May. — Nord: T. C. Laurent, réélu; A. Béliard, réélu; Damisca Nelson (Nord-Ouest) Silencieux William, réélu.					
1906, 23 May. — Artibonite : T A. Dupiton, réélu; Lanoue Sterlin, réélu; Viau.					
1906, 23 May. — Sud: Camille St.-Rémy, P. Paulin.					
1906, 23 May. — Ouest: E. Brossard, réélu, Ph. Curiel, Dauphin, Chs. Régnier.					
1907, 20 August: S. Archer (Ouest), P. Colas, (Nord-Ouest).					
1908, 25 May: Vincent aîné, Gabriel Bouché, Moreau Michel, A dré Guillaume, Davilmar Théodore, Florian Moïse, (réélu); Robert David, réélu; Salomon Jn-Baptistc, réélu.					
1908, 27 May: Candelon Rigaud, Pétrus Pallière.					
1908, 29 May: Biaise Lavache, D. Lespinasse, Calice Lerebours, réélu; H. Baussan, réélu.					
1909, 24 May: Estimé jeiune, Léonce Lubin.					
1909, 29 Juil: Cuvier Rouzier,					
1910, 20 May: Dr. Déjoie Laroche, R. Barjon, N. S. Lafontant, Vaudré Hilaire, F. N. Apollon, M. Sylvain, Aug. Durosier, Camille Molière, Sudre Dartiguenave, R. Chalviré, Léonce Lubin (réélu). NeltusNelson, St-Louis Thimothée, Salomon fils Papillon.					
1910, 5juin : F. L. Cauvin.					
1910, 8 July: Etienne Magloire.					
1912, 17 May: Michel Oreste, Ed. Roumain, D. Duplessy, Paul Laraque, Weber Francis.					
1912, 20 May: Th. Laroche. Th. Salnave, M. Jn-François, S. William, E. Dornéval, Dr. D. Désir, M. Morpeau, H. Lanoue.					
1913, 5 May: Arthur Thimothée.					
1913, May: Dr. L E. Jeanty, L. C. Lhérisson.					
1914, 22 May: Louis Ed. Pouget, C. St.-Aude, S Villard, C. Bemateau, Bussy Zamor, C. V. Cabêche, C. Latortue, F. Martineau, Dr. A. Hollant.					
1914, 1er June: S. Archer, H. Baussan, Aug, Scott, Em. Volel, J. Dussek.					
1914, 6 July: Octave Brice.					
1914, 28 October: Gerson Desrosiers.					
1914, 18 Nov : Beauhamais Jn-François.					
1915, 26 May: Canrobert Gougues.					
1915, 20 August: Jules Justin, Aug. Supplice.					
1915, 8 Nov: Antoine François.					
1915, 26 Nov: Th. Laleau.					
1917, 9; April: S. Pradel, C. Mayard, A. Arault, S. Vincent, L. Ed, Pouget, Chs, Zamor, Lecorps					
1917, 11 April: N. Lanoix, Josaphat François, E. Dornéval, P. M. Ducasse, Chs. Annoual, A. C. Sansaricq, B. Dartiguenave, P. Sannon. (Prestation de serment le 17 April 1917).					
1930, 14 October: Seymour Pradel, Sténio Vincent, Léon Nau, David Jeannot, (Ouest); Louis S. Zéphirin, Dr. Price Mars, Charles Zamor, (Nord); Charles Elisée, Denis St.-Aude, (Nord'Ouest); Dr. Hector Paultre, Dr. Justin Latortue, Charles Fombrun, (Artibonite); Antoine Télémaque, Normil Laurent, Fouchard Martineau, (Sud).					
1931, 10 Janvier; Pierre Hudicourt, (Ouest).					
1932, 10 Janv. — V. Leconte, (Nord).					
1932, 2 August: Dr. Antoine V. Carré, (Ouest); Jh. Raphaël Noël, (Nord); Rameau Loubeau, (Sud); Valencourt Pasquet, (Artibonite); Léonce William, (Nord'Ouest).					
1935, 21 Février: Dr. W. Théard, Beauvais Darbouze, Louis D. Gilles, (Sud); Francelly François, Sténio Alerte, Marceau Désinor (Artibonite); Hector Charles-Pierre (Nord);Florian Alfred, Edgard Fanfan, Charles Moravia, René T. Auguste (Ouest).					
1936, 28 September. — Normil Laurent, E. Moraille (Sud), Joseph Raphaël Noël, Adalbert Lecorps (Nord); Rivarol Lemaire, Dr. A. V. Carré, Nemours Vincent (Ouest); Christian Laporte, François Sénat Fleury (Artibonite) Denis St.-Aude, Cadet Dessources (Nord'Ouest).					
1936, 28 September ARRETE PRIS EN VERTU DE LA CONSTITUTION.— Alfred Vieux, Charles Duplessy, Edgard Fanfan (Ouest); Beauvais Darbouze, Ulysse A. Simon (Sud); Joseph Titus, Charles Fombrun (Artibonite); Louiis S. Zéphirin, J. B. V. Leconte (Nord); Charles Elisée (Nord'Ouest).					

=== 1988-present ===
Name	District	Date elected/appointed	Term ended	Term	Notes
				44th	
Thomas Eddy Dupiton	Artibonite	4 February 1991	4 February 1995	45th	
Déjean Belizaire	Artibonite			45th	
Serge Joseph	Artibonite			45th	
Serge Gilles	Centre			45th	
Hérard Pauyo	Centre			45th	
Smith Metelus	Centre			45th	
Robert Opont	Grand'Anse			45th	
Bernard Sansaricq	Grand'Anse			45th	
Yvon Ghislain	Grand'Anse			45th	
Rony Mondestin	Nord			45th	
Edrice Raymond	Nord			45th	
Raoul Remy	Nord			45th	
Firmin Jean-Louis	Nord-Est			45th	
Judnel Jean	Nord-Est			45th	
Amos Andre	Nord-Est			45th	
Luc Fleurinord	Nord-Ouest			45th	
Ebrané Cadet	Nord-Ouest			45th	
Art L. Austin	Nord-Ouest			45th	
Jacques Clarck Parent	Ouest			45th	
Turneb Delpe	Ouest			45th	
Wesner Emmanuel	Ouest			45th	
Julio Larosiliere	Sud			45th	
Franck Leonard	Sud			45th	
Frahner Jean-Baptiste	Sud			45th	
Guy Bauduy	Sud-Est			45th	
Jean-Robert Martinez	Sud-Est			45th	
Alberto Joseph	Sud-Est			45th	
Edgard Leblanc Fils		October 9, 1995	January 11, 1999	46th	
Yvon Neptune				47th	
Fourel Célestin					
Yvon Feuillé					
Youri Latortue	Artibonite			48th	
(vacant, due to death of Noël Emmanuel Limage)	Artibonite			48th	
François Fouchard Bergromme	Artibonite			48th	
Edmonde Supplice Beauzile	Centre			48th	
Jean Wilbert Jacques	Centre			48th	
(vacant, due to resignation of Ultimo Compère)	Centre			48th	
Michel Clerié	Grand'Anse			48th	
Andris Riché (vice-president)	Grand'Anse			48th	
Jean Maxime Roumer	Grand'Anse			48th	
Nenel Cassy	Nippes			48th	
Jean Joseph Pierre Louis	Nippes			48th	
Huguette Lamour	Nippes			48th	
Kely Bastien (president)	Nord			48th	
Cemephise Gilles	Nord			48th	
Antoine René Samson	Nord			48th	
(vacant, due to resignation of Rudolph H. Boulos of FUSION)	Nord-Est			48th	
Judnel Jean (2nd secretary)	Nord-Est			48th	
Jean Rodolphe Joazile	Nord-Est			48th	
Eddy Bastien (1st secretary)	Nord-Ouest			48th	
Evallière Beauplan	Nord-Ouest			48th	
Miléus Hypolite	Nord-Ouest			48th	
Anacacis Jean Hector	Ouest			48th	
Rudy Hérivaux	Ouest			48th	
Evelyne Cheron	Ouest			48th	
Yvon Buissereth	Sud			48th	
Fritz Carlos Lebon (Quaestor)	Sud			48th	
Fortuné Jean Gabriel	Sud			48th	
Joseph Lambert	Sud-Est			48th	
Laurent Fequière Mathurin	Sud-Est			48th	
Ricard Pierre	Sud-Est			48th	
				49th	
François Anick Joseph	Artibonite		2017	50th	
Carl Murat Cantave	Artibonite		2020	50th	
Youri Latortue	Artibonite		2022	50th	
Francesco Delacruz	Centre		2017	50th	
(vacant, due to expiration of term in 2013)	Centre		none	50th	
(vacant, due to expiration of term in 2015)	Centre		none	50th	
Riché Andris	Grand'Anse		2017	50th	
(vacant, due to expiration of term in 2013)	Grand'Anse		none	50th	
(vacant, due to expiration of term in 2015)	Grand'Anse		none	50th	
	Nippes			50th	
Francenet Denius	Nippes		2020	50th	
Nenel Cassy	Nippes		2022	50th	
Westner Polycarpe	Nord		2017	50th	
(vacant, due to expiration of term in 2013)	Nord		none	50th	
(vacant, due to expiration of term in 2015)	Nord		none	50th	
Jean-Baptiste Bien-Aimé	Nord-Est		2017	50th	
Jacques Sauveur Jean	Nord-Est		2020	50th	
Ronald Larêche	Nord-Est		2022	50th	
François Lucas Sainvil	Nord-Ouest		2017	50th	
Evallière Beauplan	Nord-Ouest		2020	50th	
Onondieu Louis	Nord-Ouest		2022	50th	
Steven I. Benoit	Ouest		2017	50th	
Antonio Cherami	Ouest		2020	50th	
Jean Renel Senatus	Ouest		2022	50th	
Fritz Carlos Lebon	Sud		2017	50th	
Richard Lenine Hervé Fourcand	Sud		2020	50th	
Jean-Marie Junior Salomon	Sud		2022	50th	
Edwin Zenny	Sud-Est		2017	50th	
Ricard Pierre	Sud-Est		2020	50th	
Dieupie CHERUBIN	Sud-Est		2022	50th	
