= List of legislatures of the Haitian Parliament =

The following is a list of the terms of the Parliament of Haiti since the formation of the first bicameral parliament in 1817. In Haitian historiography, the first unicameral Senate, which served from 1806 to 1817, is considered separate from the first Legislature

== List of legislatures ==
Legislature	Elections	Term	Presidents of the Lower House	Presidents of the Senate	Head(s) of state	Notes	References
1st Senate		1806 - 1817			Pétion	unicameral 24-member legislature nominated by adult male voters but ultimately elected by other senators. only governed southern Haiti.	
1st Legislature		April 22, 1817 – March 31, 1822	Pierre André, N.-D. Lafargue		Pétion; Boyer	first bicameral legislature under the Revised Constitution of 1806. Governed southern Haiti from 1817-1820 when the northern Kingdom of Haiti was reintegrated.	
2nd Legislature		April 1822-March 31, 1827			Boyer	governed the entire island.	
3rd Legislature		April 1827-March 31, 1832			Boyer		
4th Legislature		April 1832-March 31, 1837			Boyer		
5th Legislature		April 1837-March 31, 1842			Boyer		
6th Legislature		April 6, 1842-Sept. 1843			Boyer; Rivière-Hérard		
vacant		1843-1847			Rivière-Hérard; Guerrier; Pierrot; Riché	Haitian occupation of eastern side of the island ends in 1844.	
7th Legislature		March 11, 1847 – March 31, 1852			Soulouque		
8th Legislature		April 7, 1852 – March 31, 1857			Soulouque		
9th Legislature		April 14, 1857 – March 31, 1862			Geffrard; Soulouque		
10th Legislature		April 14, 1862 – July 3, 1863			Geffrard	dissolved by order of Fabre Geffrard over budgetary disputes (June 8, 1863).	
11th Legislature		September 3, 1863 – March 17, 1867			Saget; Salnave	formed after a snap election (September 7, 1863)	
12th Legislature		October 3, 1867 – February 4, 1869			Salnave	driven out of chambers by supporters of Sylvain Salnave (October 14, 1867). Continued to meet until the civil war became too intense to continue.	
vacant		1869 - 1870			Saget		
13th Legislature		May 21, 1870 – March 31, 1873			Saget		
14th Legislature		July 30, 1873 - May 14, 1874			Saget; Council of Secretaries of State		
15th Legislature		Oct. 7, 1875 -April 14, 1879			Domingue; Boisrond-Canal		
16th Legislature		May 15, 1879-Jan. 1882			Public Order Committee; Lamothe; Hyppolite; Salomon		
17th Legislature	1882	Jan. 1882-March 14, 1887			Salomon		
18th Legislature		April 5, 1887-Oct. 25, 1888			Salomon; Boisrond-Canal; Légitime		
vacant		1888-1890			Légitime; Jeune; Hyppolite		
19th Legislature		May 26, 1890 – April 15, 1893			Hyppolite		
20th Legislature		August 11, 1893 – March 31, 1896			Hyppolite		
vacant		1896 - 1899			T. S. Sam		
21st Legislature		April 9, 1896-4 April 1899			T. S. Sam		
22nd Legislature		May 31, 1899 – April 10, 1902			T. S. Sam		
23rd Legislature		April 14, 1902 – May 12, 1902			T. S. Sam; Boisrond-Canal		
24th Legislature		Dec. 21, 1902- April 2, 1905			Alexis		
25th Legislature		May 4, 1905 – April 7, 1908			Alexis		
26th Legislature		April 21, 1908 – April 9, 1911			Alexis; Commission for Public Order; Simon		
27th Legislature		May 10, 1911-Jan. 25, 1914			Leconte; Auguste; Oreste		
28th Legislature		April 23, 1914 – April 1, 1917			Polynice; Zamor; Polynice; Théodore; Guillaume Sam; Revolutionary Committee; Dartiguenave	assassination of Vilbrun Guillaume Sam; beginning of the United States occupation of Haiti (1915)	
29th Legislature		April 19, 1917 – June 19, 1917			Dartiguenave	dissolved by Philippe Sudré Dartiguenave when he refused to accept the results of Senate elections in January 1917	
vacant		1917-1930			Dartiguenave; Borno; Roy	presidents elected by a Council of State	
30th legislature	1930	Nov. 17, 1930-April 3, 1932			Vincent		
31st Legislature	1932	April 13, 1932 – 1935			Vincent		
32nd Legislature	1935	January 20, 1935 – January 14, 1941			Vincent		
33rd Legislature	1941	January 30, 1941 – January 12, 1945			Lescot		
National Constituent Assembly		1946			Lavaud		
34th Legislature	1946	April 2, 1946 – April 2, 1950			Estimé; Lavaud		
Constituent Assembly		1950			Lavaud		
35th Legislature		April 2, 1950 – May 10, 1950			Lavaud		
36th Legislature	1950, 1955	December 6, 1950 – April 10, 1955			Magloire		
vacant		1955 - 1956			Pierre-Louis		
37th Legislature		Jan. 22, 1957-March 29, 1957			Sylvain^{‡}; Cantave; Executive Government Council; Cantave; Cantave; Fignolé; Kébreau		
38th Legislature	1957	Oct. 11, 1957- April 10, 1961			F. Duvalier	Mostly consists of supporters of François Duvalier. Passes the 1957 constitution, which abolishes the Senate	
39th Legislature	1961, 1964	May 12, 1961 – April 10, 1967			F. Duvalier	First unicameral legislature under the rule of François Duvalier and the 1961 constitution	
40th Legislature	1967	April 10, 1967 – April 8, 1973			F. Duvalier, J-C Duvalier		
41st Legislature	1973	April 9, 1973 – April 8, 1979			J-C Duvalier		
42nd Legislature	1979	April 9, 1979 – August 27, 1983			J-C Duvalier		
43rd Legislature	1984	1984- Feb 7, 1986			J-C Duvalier	unicameral legislature suspended by the National Council of Government.	
Constitutional Assembly	1986	1986-1988			Namphy	governed by the National Council of Government	
44th Legislature	1987–1988	Feb 7, 1988- Jun 20, 1988			Manigat	Bicameral legislature restored under 1987 constitution; legislature suspended by 1988 coup	
vacant		1988 - 1991			Namphy; Avril; Abraham; Pascal-Trouillot		
45th Legislature	1990–91, 1993	Feb 4, 1991-Feb 4, 1995			Aristide; Cédras; Nérette; Bazin; Jonassaint; Aristide		
46th Legislature	1995, 1997	Oct 9, 1995- Jan 11, 1999			Préval		
47th Legislature	2000	Aug 2000- Jan 12, 2004			Aristide	legislature dissolved by 2004 Haitian coup d'état	
vacant		2004 - 2006			Alexandre		
48th Legislature	2006, 2009 (Senate)	May 8, 2006- May 10, 2010			Préval		
49th Legislature	2010-2011	April 25, 2011- 13 January 2015			Martelly		
50th Legislature	2015–16 (general), 2016–17 (Senate)	Jan 11, 2016-January 2020	Chancy; Bodeau		Privert; Moïse	most recent legislature to meet	
vacant	TBD	2020–present			Joseph^{*}; Henry^{*}; Transitional Presidential Council	elections indefinitely postponed due to ongoing political crisis	
