= 1st Senate of Haiti =

The 1st Senate of Haiti was organized from the Constituent Assembly which drafted the 1806 Constitution. After the elected president and previous Provisional Chief Executive of Haiti Henri Christophe took up arms against the Senate, the Senate retaliated by stripping power from Christophe and electing Alexandre Pétion as president of Haiti in early 1807.

The 24-member Senate was the first legislative body in post-revolutionary Haiti, and was designed by Pétion to be a powerful body. The members were nominated by Pétion from regions of the country for affirmation by the members, with a third each being selected for nine, six and three-year terms. The Senate was suspended until 1811 due to the power struggle which split Haiti between Pétion and Christophe. Those senators who remained in office representing western and southern Haiti voted to re-elect Pétion to the presidency on March 9, 1811 and again in 1815. However, Pétion tired of the Senate, and successfully pushed for a significant revision to the 1806 Constitution in 1816, including authorizing him to serve as president for life, as well as the transformation of the unicameral Senate to the first bicameral Parliament.

== Members ==
| Name | District | Date elected/appointed | Term ended | Term | Notes |
|---|---|---|---|---|---|
| Alexandre Pétion | Port-au-Prince | 28 December 1806 | 28 December 1815 | 9 years; | elected by the Senate as President of Haiti 9 March 1807 |
| Charles Lys | Port-au-Prince | 28 December 1806 | 28 December 1815 | 9 years | |
| Etienne Elie Gérin | Anse-à-Veau | 28 December 1806 | 28 December 1815 | 9 years | |
| Ignace Fresnel | Port-au-Prince | 28 December 1806 | 28 December 1815 | 9 years | re-elected on 22 February 1827 |
| Gabriel David-Troy | Port-au-Prince | 28 December 1806 | 28 December 1815 | 9 years | |
| Lamothe Aigron | Cap-Haïtien | 28 December 1806 | 28 December 1815 | 9 years | |
| César Thélémaque | Cap-Haïtien | 28 December 1806 | 28 December 1812 | 6 years | elected senate president on 31 December 1806 |
| Jean-Louis Barlatier | Mirebalais | 28 December 1806 | 28 December 1812 | 6 years | |
| Jn-Louis Despas Médina | Cayes | 28 December 1806 | 28 December 1812 | 6 years | |
| Magloire Ambroise | Jacmel | 28 December 1806 | 28 December 1812 | 6 years | |
| Pierre Timothé, (Aubert) | Port-de-Paix | 28 December 1806 | 28 December 1812 | 6 years | took the oath of office, but later joined the rebels. Replaced separately by Jean-Auguste Voltaire on March 4, 1807. |
| Bruno Blanchet jeune | Port-au-Prince | 28 December 1806 | 28 December 1812 | 6 years | |
| Louis Auguste Daumec | Port-au-Prince | 28 December 1806 | 28 December 1809 | 3 years | did not accept re-appointment in 1815, re-elected 3 February 1825 |
| Théodat Trichet | Cayes | 28 December 1806 | 28 December 1809 | 3 years | |
| Charles Daguilh | Cayes | 28 December 1806 | 28 December 1809 | 3 years | |
| Félix Ferrier | Cap-Haïtien | 28 December 1806 | 28 December 1809 | 3 years | |
| Guy Joseph Bonnet | Port-au-Prince | 28 December 1806 | 28 December 1809 | 3 years | |
| Jean-Louis Guillaume Manigat | Fort-Dauphin | 28 December 1806 | 28 December 1809 | 3 years | |
| Jean Simon | Saint-Marc | 28 December 1806 | 28 December 1809 | 3 years | |
| Yayou | Port-au-Prince | 28 December 1806 | 28 December 1809 | 3 years | |
| Pélage Varein | Gonaïves | March 4, 1807 | | | |
| Jean-Louis Larose | Port-au-Prince | March 4, 1807 | | | re-elected 28 February 1817 |
| Philippe Bourjolly-Modé | Jacmel | March 4, 1807 | | | |
| Louis Leroux | Port-au-Prince | March 30, 1807 | | | |
| Jean-Auguste Voltaire | Cayes | March 4, 1807 | | | |
| Joseph Neptune | Port-au-Prince | March 30, 1807 | | | |
| André Auguste Borno Lamarre | Port-au-Prince | 21 March 1808 | | | |
| Jean-Baptiste Delaunay | Miragoâne | 4 May 1808 | | | |
| Casimir Célestin Panayoty | Port-au-Prince | 5 December 1815 | | | |
| Jean-Baptiste Bayard | Jacmel | 5 December 1815 | | | |
| Antoine Gédéon | Port-au-Prince | 5 December 1815 | | | |
| Etienne Célestin Obas | Port-au-Prince | 5 December 1815 | | | |
| Jean Augustin Hogu | Port-au-Prince | 5 December 1815 | | | |
| Hilaire Martin | Jacmel | 5 December 1815 | | | |
| Paul Romain | ? | 28 December 1806 | | 9 years | never took office, joined Christophe's rebellion. |
| Toussaint-Brave | ? | 28 December 1806 | | 9 years | never took office, joined Christophe's rebellion. |
| Étienne Magny | ? | 28 December 1806 | | 6 years | never took office, joined Christophe's rebellion. |
| Charéron | ? | 28 December 1806 | | 6 years | never took office, joined Christophe's rebellion. |
| Montbrun | ? | March 4, 1807 | | | appointed by Pétion, but turned down the appointment. Replaced by Leroux |
| Jean-Pierre Boyer | | 5 December 1815 | | | did not accept appointment in 1815 |
| Frédéric | | 5 December 1815 | | | did not accept appointment in 1815 |
| J.-F. Lespinasse | | 5 December 1815 | | | did not accept appointment in 1815 |

== Presidents ==
| Name | Took office | Left office | Party |
|---|---|---|---|
| César Télémaque | 31 December 1806 | February 1807 | |
| Jean-Louis Barlatier | March 1807 | April 1807 | |
| Louis-Auguste Daumec | April 1807 | May 1807 | |
| Théodat Trichet | June 1807 | 1807 | |
| Guy Joseph Bonnet | 1808 | 4 March 1808 | |
| Gabriel David Troy | 4 March 1808 | April 1808 | |
| Jean-Louis Larose | May 1808 | June 1808 | |
| Pierre Charles Lys | July 1808 | August 1808 | |
| Philippe Bourjolly-Modé | September 1808 | 18 November 1808 | |
| Louis-Auguste Daumec | 18 November 1808 | ? | |
| Jean-Louis Larose | ? | April 1811 | |
| Louis Leroux | May 1811 | 1811 | |
| Jean-Auguste Voltaire | 1812 | 1812 | |
| Jean-Louis Larose | 1812 | ? | |
| Pierre Charles Lys | 1813 | 1813 | |
| Jean-Auguste Voltaire | 1813 | ? | |
| Jean-Louis Larose | 1814 | 1814 | |
| Louis Leroux | 1814 | July 1814 | |
| Jean-Louis Larose | August 1814 | 1814 | |
| Jean-Auguste Voltaire | 1814 | December 1814 | |
| Jean-Louis Larose | December 1814 | 1815 | |
| Pierre Charles Lys | 1815 | 1815 | |
| Joseph Neptune | 1815 | January 1816 | |
| Casimir Célestin Panayoty | January 1816 | 1816 | |
| Jean-Baptiste Bayard | 1816 | ? | |
