= 50th Legislature of the Haitian Parliament =

This is a list of the 149 members of the 50th Parliament of Haiti. The House of Representatives is currently defunct as of 13 January 2020, as the terms of the representatives elected in the 2015-16 election expired. 10 senators elected in 2016-17 retained their seat until 10 January 2023, and after the expiration of those remaining senators' terms, Haiti has no elected members of either chamber of its Parliament.

== Senate ==
Composition of the Haitian Senate in the 50th Legislature: Unity: 5 seats Alternative: 5 seats OPL: 1 seat Verite: 3 seats KID: 3 seats Pitit Desalin: 1 seat LIDE: 1 seat Pont: 1 seat Fanmi Lavalas: 1 seat PHTK: 2 seats AAA: 1 seat Vacant: 6 seats

=== Delegation from Artibonite department ===
Senator (and position)	Party	Expiration of term
François Anick Joseph	ALTERNATIVE	2017
Carl Murat Cantave	KID	2020
Youri Latortue	AAA	2022

=== Delegation from Centre department ===
Senator (and position)	Party	Expiration of term
Francesco Delacruz	ALTERNATIVE	2017
(vacant, due to expiration of term in 2013)	none	none
(vacant, due to expiration of term in 2015)	none	none

=== Delegation from Grand'Anse department ===
Senator (and position)	Party	Expiration of term
Riché Andris	ALTERNATIVE	2017
(vacant, due to expiration of term in 2013)	none	none
(vacant, due to expiration of term in 2015)	none	none

=== Delegation from Nippes department ===
Senator (and position)	Party	Expiration of term
Francenet Denius	VERITÉ	2020
Nenel Cassy	FL	2022

=== Delegation from Nord department ===
Senator (and position)	Party	Expiration of term
Westner Polycarpe	ALTERNATIVE	2017
(vacant, due to expiration of term in 2013)	none	none
(vacant, due to expiration of term in 2015)	none	none

=== Delegation from Nord-Est department ===
Senator (and position)	Party	Expiration of term
Jean-Baptiste Bien-Aimé	INITE	2017
Jacques Sauveur Jean	PHTK	2020
Ronald Larêche	VERITÉ	2022

=== Delegation from Nord-Ouest department ===
Senator (and position)	Party	Expiration of term
François Lucas Sainvil	INITE	2017
Evallière Beauplan	PONT	2020
Onondieu Louis	KID	2022

=== Delegation from Ouest department ===
Senator (and position)	Party	Expiration of term
Steven I. Benoit	ALTERNATIVE	2017
Antonio Cherami	VERITÉ	2020
Jean Renel Senatus	LIDE	2022

=== Delegation from Sud department ===
Senator (and position)	Party	Expiration of term
Fritz Carlos Lebon	INITE	2017
Richard Lenine Hervé Fourcand	PHTK	2020
Jean-Marie Junior Salomon	OPL	2022

=== Delegation from Sud-Est department ===
Senator (and position)	Party	Expiration of term
Edwin Zenny	INITE	2017
Ricard Pierre	PITIT DESSALINES	2020
Dieupie CHERUBIN	KID	2022

== Leaders ==
=== Senate ===
Name	Took office	Left office	Party
Riché Andris	12 January 2015	14 January 2016	Alternative
Jocelerme Privert	14 January 2016	14 February 2016	INITE
Ronald Larêche	14 February 2016	13 January 2017	VÉRITÉ
Youri Latortue	13 January 2017	9 January 2018	AAA
Joseph Lambert	9 January 2018	17 January 2019	KONA
Carl Murat Cantave	17 January 2019	14 January 2020	KID
Pierre François Sildor	14 January 2020	12 January 2021	PHTK
Joseph Lambert	12 January 2021	11 January 2022	KONA
Joseph Lambert	11 January 2022	10 January 2023	KONA

=== Chamber of Deputies ===
Name	Took office	Left office
Cholzer Chancy	2016	10 January 2018
Gary Bodeau	10 January 2018	13 January 2020
