= 45th Legislature of the Haitian Parliament =

Haitian Legislature (1991-1994)

The 45th Legislature of the Haitian Parliament was in office from 4 February 1991 to 4 February 1995.

== Elections ==
Following the June 1988 military-led coup d'état, the newly-formed 44th Legislature was dissolved. Legislative activity was further delayed by the September 1988 coup and ongoing military rule. After the departures of Generals Namphy and Avril, General Hérard Abraham organized elections for president and Parliament in two rounds of elections on 16 December 1990 and 20 January 1991, alongside the presidential election. Jean-Bertrand Aristide's National Front for Change and Democracy (FCND) won the parliamentary elections, with a voter turnout of 50.8%.

The 45th Legislature's work was disrupted by a military coup eight months after the elections, which overthrew Aristide. Additional partial Senate elections were held in Haiti on 18 January 1993 to elect one-third of the 27-member Senate, alongside by-elections for one seat in the Senate and three seats in the Chamber of Deputies.

These 1993 elections, conducted under the rule of Raoul Cédras (who had overthrown the democratically elected government in the 1991 coup) and overseen by Marc Bazin, were declared illegitimate by the Permanent Council of the Organization of American States. The elected members were generally supportive of the coup.

On 2 March 1993, police and soldiers entered Parliament in an attempt to remove 13 parliamentarians elected in 1990 to make way for the newly elected members. The presence of the 1993-elected members posed an additional obstacle to negotiations for returning to civilian rule; however, it was eventually agreed that they would not take their seats.

Legislative activity largely continued with the return of Aristide and civilian rule in October 1994.

== Members ==
=== Senate ===
- Artibonite: Thomas Eddy Dupiton, Déjean Belizaire, Serge Joseph
- Centre: Serge Gilles, Hérard Pauyo, Smith Metelus
- Grand-Anse: Robert Opont, Bernard Sansaricq, Yvon Ghislain
- Nord: Rony Mondestin, Edrice Raymond, Raoul Remy
- Nord-Est: Firmin Jean-Louis, Judnel Jean, Amos Andre
- Nord-Ouest: Luc Fleurinord, Ebrané Cadet, Art L. Austin
- Ouest: Jacques Clarck Parent, Turneb Delpe, Wesner Emmanuel
- Sud: Julio Larosiliere, Franck Leonard, Frahner Jean-Baptiste
- Sud-Est: Guy Bauduy, Jean-Robert Martinez, Alberto Joseph

== Leaders ==
=== Senate ===
Name	Took office	Left office	Party
Endrice Raymond	1991	1991	FNCD
Déjean Bélizaire	? - August 1991	31 January 1993	MNP 28
Firmin Jean-Louis and Thomas Eddy Dupiton	31 January 1993	4 February 1994	FNCD
Bernard Sansaricq	4 February 1994	October 1994	
Firmin Jean-Louis	October 1994	13 October 1995	FNCD

=== Chamber of Deputies ===
Name	Took office	Left office	Party
Ernst Pedro Casséus	1991	20 August 1991	MOP
Pierre Duly Brutus	20 August 1991	1992	
Alexandre Médard	15 January 1992	January 1993	
Antoine Joseph	January 1993	January 1994	
Frantz Robert Mondé	13 January 1994	1994	
Pierre Duly Brutus	1994	1995	
