= 1st Legislature of the Haitian Parliament =

The 1st Legislature of the Haitian Parliament held office from April 22, 1817, to March 31, 1822. It was the first bicameral parliament, introduced by the Revised Constitution of 1806 under President Alexandre Pétion. It succeeded the 1st unicameral Senate of Haiti, adding the 29-member "Chamber of Representatives of the Communes" as the lower house. Despite the expansion of the parliament, Pétion's also revised the constitution to designate himself as president for life, and the Senate approved his designation of Jean-Pierre Boyer as his successor. In addition, the revision adjusted the 24 Senate members' terms entirely to nine-year terms, and the Chamber of Commons regularly accepted Pétion's slates of nominations for appointments to the Senate. Initially a supporter of democracy, Pétion found the constraints imposed on him by the senate onerous and suspended the legislature in 1818. It was reconstituted following Boyer's succession to the presidency on 30 March 1818.

The parliament only governed southern Haiti until 1820, when the northern Kingdom of Haiti was overthrown in a coup and reintegrated under Boyer's government in Port-au-Prince.

== Members ==
=== Senate ===
Senator	Appointment	End of term	Department	Notes
Pierre Simon				
Hilaire Martin	5 December 1815			
Jean-Louis Larose	28 February 1817			previous held office 1807-?
Casimir Célestin Panayoty	5 December 1815			
Jean-Baptiste Bayard	5 December 1815			
Antoine Gédéon	5 December 1815			
Etienne Célestin Obas	5 December 1815			
Jean Augustin Hogu	5 December 1815			
Noel Viallet	28 April 1817	28 April 1826	Port-au-Prince	re-elected 14 July 1834
Eloy	28 April 1817	28 April 1826	Port-au-Prince	
Stanislas Lamothe	28 April 1817	28 April 1826	Port-au-Prince	
François Arrault	28 April 1817	28 April 1826	Port-au-Prince	
Alexandre Dégand	28 April 1817	28 April 1826	Anse-à-Veau	
Jean-Baptiste Désiré Canaux	29 May 1820	29 May 1829	Port-au-Prince	
Louis Bazelais	24 September 1821	24 September 1830	Port-au-Prince	
Amédé Gayot	24 September 1821	24 September 1830	Port-au-Prince	
Antoine Lerebours	24 September 1821	24 September 1830	Port-au-Prince	re-elected 14 July 1834
Jean Thézan	24 September 1821	24 September 1830	Port-au-Prince	
Germain Linard	24 September 1821	24 September 1830	Port-au-Prince	
Samon Roche	24 September 1821	24 September 1830	St. Marc	
Noël Colard	26 September 1821	24 September 1830	Jean-Rabel	
Joseph Philiaire	26 September 1821	24 September 1830	Cap-Haïtien	
Stanislas Latortue	26 September 1821	24 September 1830	Cap-Haïtien	

=== Chamber of Representatives ===
Representative	Commune
Louis Vérac	Mirebalais
Plomba Ladouceur	Croix-des-Bouquets
Pierre André	Port-au-Prince
Godefroy	Port-au-Prince
Rasteau	Port-au-Prince
Vilbon	Léogâne
Desnoyers jeune	Grand-Goâve
Louque	Petit-Goâve
Doret	Miragoâne
Erasme Anglade	Anse-à-Veau
Doizé Pouponneau	Petit-Trou
Dutreuilh	Corail
Laraque ainé	Jérémie
Labissiere	Abricots
Pierre Lundi	Dalmarie
N/A	Anse d'Hainault
Pierre-Louis Mozaine	Tiburon
George Mallet	Coteaux
F. Dubreuil	Torbeck
D. Sully	Port-Salut
Salomon fils	Cayes
Lafargue	Cayes
Verdier	Cavaillon
Lefranc	Saint-Louis
Baudouin	Acquin
Arbouet	Baynet
Louis Baronnet	Jacmel
Pierre Maillard	Marigot
Gédéon	Saltrou

== Leaders ==
=== Senate ===
Name	Took office	Left office	Party
Pierre Simon	1817	August 1817	
Jean-Louis Larose	August 1817	?	
Hilaire Martin	? – 1820	1820 – ?	
Amédé Gayot	1821	?	

=== Chamber of Representatives ===
Name	Took office	Left office	Party
Pierre André	? - 1817	1817–?	
N.-D. Lafargue	? - July 1820	July 1820–?	
Pierre André	? - 1820	1820–?	
Doizé Pouponneau	? - November 1821	November 1821–?	
