= 3rd Legislature of the Haitian Parliament =

The 3rd Legislature of the Haitian Parliament met from April 1827-March 31, 1832.

== Members ==
=== Senate ===
| Name | | Took office | Left office | |
|---|---|---|---|---|
| Antoine Lerebours | | 24 September 1821 | 24 September 1830 | |
| Pierre François Birot | Port-au-Prince | 23 July 1822 | 1831 | |
| Jean Rigolet, | St. Marc | 23 July 1822 | 1831 | |
| Eliacin Dupuche | Port-au-Prince | 21 October 1822 | 21 October 1831 | |
| Coquière Dupiton | Port-au-Prince | 28 October 1822 | 28 October 1831 | |
| Joseph Pitre jeune | Port-au-Prince | 14 April 1824 | 14 April 1833 | |
| Antoine Martinez Valdès | Santo-Domingo | 28 June 1824 | 28 June 1833 | |
| Desrivières Chanlatte | Port-au-Prince | 14 January 1825 | 14 January 1834 | |
| Dévalions | Léogâne | 24 January 1825 | 24 January 1834 | |
| François Sambour | Cayes | 26 January 1825 | 26 January 1834 | |
| Jean-Louis Lafontant père | Jacmel | 31 January 1825 | 31 January 1834 | |
| Louis-Auguste Daumec | | 3 February 1825 | 3 February 1834 | first elected 1806-1809. Did not accept re-appointment in 1815 |
| Pierre-Prosper Rouanez (Romanez) | Port-au-Prince | 8 February 1825 | 8 February 1834 | |
| Fonroë Dubreuil | Cayes | 13 January 1826 | 13 January 1835 | |
| Jean-François Lespinasse | Port-au-Prince | 20 January 1826 | 20 January 1835 | |
| Louis Gabriel Audigé | Port-au-Prince | 26 February 1826 | 26 February 1835 | |
| Jean Colin Castor | Port-au-Prince | 21 April 1826 | 21 April 1835 | |
| Jacques Hyppolyte Laroche | Port-au-Prince | 24 April 1826 | 24 April 1835 | |
| Charles Théodore Cupidon | Port-au-Prince | 14 February 1827 | 14 February 1836 | |
| Fleuran Chevalier | Petit-Trou | 6 August 1828 | 1837 | |
| Gilles Bénèche | Baradères | 11 August 1828 | 1837 | |
| Marie Eth. Eustache Frémont | Port-au-Prince | 4 Septembre 1830 | 1839 | |
| Noël Piron | Port-au-Prince | 4 Septembre 1830 | 1839 | |
| Philippe Laraque | Jérémie | 4 Septembre 1830 | 1839 | |
| Glésil | Cayes | 25 September 1830 | 1839 | |
| Louis Rigaud | Port-au-Prince | 10 Octobre 1830 | 1839 | |
| Lochard aîné | Miragoâne | 12 October 1830 | 1839 | |
| Jean Béchet | Port-au-Prince | 17 October 1830 | 1839 | |
| Jn. Jh. Dieudonné | Port-au-Prince | 18 October 1830 | 1839 | |
| François Domingue Labbée | Cayes | 26 October 1830 | 1839 | |
| Joseph Georges | Port-au-Prince | 8 December 1830 | 1839 | |

== Presidents ==
=== Senate ===
| Name | Took office | Left office | Party |
|---|---|---|---|
| François Sambour | 1827 | 1827 – ? | |
| Fonroë Dubreuil | ? – 1828 | 1828 | |
| Jean-François Lespinasse | 1828 | 1828 | |
| Louis Gabriel Audigé | 1828 | 1828 | |
| François Sambour | 1828 | 1829 | |
| Jean-François Lespinasse | 1829 | 1830 | |
| Antoine Martinez Valdès | 1830 | 1830 | |
| Eustache Frémont | 1830 | 1831 | |
| Louis Gabriel Audigé | 1831 | 1831 – ? | |
| Joseph Georges | ? – 1832 | 1832 | |

=== Chamber of Deputies ===
| Name | Took office | Left office | Party |
|---|---|---|---|
| Jean Benis | 1827 | 1827 | |
| Jacques Depa | 1827 | 1827–? | |
| M. Druilhet | ? - 1828 | 1828 | |
| Doizé Pouponneau | 1828 | 1828 | |
| D. Villedautant | 1828 | 1829–? | |
| E. Legros | ? - 1830 | 1830 | |
| Doizé Pouponneau | 1830 | 1830–? | |
| A. Massez | ? - 1831 | 1831–? | |
| J. S. Milscent | ? - 1832 | 1832 | |
| G. Malval | 1832 | 1832–? | |
