= 5th Legislature of the Haitian Parliament =

The 5th Legislature of the Haitian Parliament met from April 1837-March 31, 1842.

== Members ==
=== Senate ===
Name	District	Took office	Left office	Notes
Fleuran Chevalier	Petit-Trou	6 August 1828	1837	
Gilles Bénèche	Baradères	11 August 1828	1837	
Marie Eth. Eustache Frémont	Port-au-Prince	4 Septembre 1830	1839	
Noël Piron	Port-au-Prince	4 Septembre 1830	1839	
Philippe Laraque	Jérémie	4 Septembre 1830	1839	
Glésil	Cayes	25 September 1830	1839	
Louis Rigaud	Port-au-Prince	10 Octobre 1830	1839	
Lochard aîné	Miragoâne	12 October 1830	1839	
Jean Béchet	Port-au-Prince	17 October 1830	1839	
Jn. Jh. Dieudonné	Port-au-Prince	18 October 1830	1839	
François Domingue Labbée	Cayes	26 October 1830	1839	
Joseph Georges	Port-au-Prince	8 December 1830	1839	
Louis Alin	Port-de-Paix	6 Juin 1832	1841	
Antoine Paret	Jérémie	3 July 1833	1842	
Alexis Beaubrun Ardouin	Port-au-Prince	17 Juillet 1833	1842	
Pierre André	Port-au-Prince	22 July 1833	1842	
Jean Pierre Oriol	Port-au-Prince	16 Avril 1834	1843	
Désiré Maillard,	Jacmel	5 May 1834	1843	
José Joaquim Delmonte,	Santo-Domingo	21 May 1834	1843	
Joseph Noël,	Cap-Haïtien	23 May 1834	1843	
Emérand Lafontant	Port-au-Prince	30 May 1834	1843	
Charles Bàzelais	Port-au-Prince	4 Juin 1835	1844	
Pierre Louis Bouzi	Port-au-Prince	5 Juin 1835	1844	
Thomas Madiou	Port-au-Prince	19 Septembre 1836	1845	
Jh. Guillaume Longchamp	Cayes	21 Septembre 1836	1845	
Louis Lézeaux jeune	Aquin	5 October 1836	1845	
Jean-Jacques Sully	Cayes	19 October 1836	1845	
Jean-Claude Michel jeune	Jacmel	20 Avril 1838	1847	
Rozier Decossard	Jérémie	2 May 1838	1847	
Jérôme Chardavoine	Cayes	4 Septembre 1839	1847	
Tassy aîné	Cap-Haïtien	7 October 1839	1847	
Calice Bonneau	Port-au-Prince	11 October 1839	1847	
Philippe César	Grand Goâve	14 October 1839	1847	
Gabriel Dallon	Arcahaie	16 October 1839	1847	
Guillaume Chegaraye	Cayes	23 October 1839		
Alexandre Bouchereau	Port-au-Prince	18 Avril 1840		
Pierre Bineau	Anse-à-Veau	17 June 1840		
Michel Charles jeune	Mirebalais	26 Juillet 1841		
Héraux aîné	Cap-Haïtien	26 Juillet 1841		

== Presidents ==
=== Senate ===
Name	Took office	Left office	Party
Jose Joachim Del Monte	1837	1837	
Beaubrun Ardouin	1837	?	
Amédé Gayot	1838	1838	
Charles Bazelais	1838	1838	
Beaubrun Ardouin	1838	1839	

=== House of Commons ===
Name	Took office	Left office	Party
Phanor Dupin	? - October 1839	October 1839–?	
