= 7th Legislature of the Haitian Parliament =

The 7th Legislature of the Haitian Parliament met from March 11, 1847-March 31, 1852. The legislature met following the promulgation of the Constitution of 1846 (amended in 1859 and 1860), in which the Senate was expanded to thirty-six members, all serving nine-year terms, and the House of Representatives consisting of two representatives per district.

== Members ==
=== Senate ===
Name	District	Took office	Left office	Notes
Jérôme Chardavoine	Cayes	4 Septembre 1839	1848	
Tassy aîné	Cap-Haïtien	7 October 1839	1848	
Calice Bonneau	Port-au-Prince	11 October 1839	1848	
Philippe César	Grand Goâve	14 October 1839	1848	
Gabriel Dallon	Arcahaie	16 October 1839	1848	
Guillaume Chegaraye	Cayes	23 October 1839	1848	
Alexandre Bouchereau	Port-au-Prince	18 Avril 1840	1849	
Pierre Bineau	Anse-à-Veau	17 June 1840	1849	
Michel Charles jeune	Mirebalais	26 Juillet 1841	1850	
Héraux aîné	Cap-Haïtien	26 Juillet 1841	1850	
Jean Daguerre	Port-au-Prince	20 Avril 1843	1852	
Lunley Ch. Cerisier	Port-au-Prince	20 Avril 1843	1852	
Jean-Paul	Port-au-Prince	4 May 1843	1852	re-elected 1847
Louis Séguy Vilvaleix aîné	Port-au-Prince	4 May 1843	1852	
Paul Emile Berthonieux	Port-au-Prince	13 June 1843	1852	
Jean Michel Corvoisier	Gonaïves	15 June 1843	1852	
Jean Bénis	Petit-Goâve	15 June 1843	1852	
Détré	Port-au-Prince	17 Mars 1847		
Casimir Jean-Baptiste	Port-au-Prince	15 Novembre 1847		réélu le 8 Juillet 1856
Alphonse Larochel	Port-au-Prince	15 Novembre 1847		réélu le 8 Juillet 1856
Duverno Trouillot	Port-au-Prince	15 Novembre 1847		réélu le 8 Juillet 1856
Désormes Ls. Lafontant	Port-au-Prince	13 Octobre 1848		réélu le 13 Octobre 1857
Jean-Baptiste Alerte	Léogane	13 Octobre 1848		
Jean Michel Duval	Port-au-Prince	13 Octobre 1848		réélu le 13 Octobre 1857
Hippolite Lucas	Port-au-Prince	13 Octobre 1848		réélu le 13 Octobre 1857
Jean-Baptiste Pernier	Croix des Bouquets	13 Octobre 1848		réélu le 13 Octobre 1857
Clervaux Lavache	Port-au-Prince	13 Octobre 1848		
Saladin Lamour	Port-au-Prince	13 Octobre 1848		réélu le 13 Octobre 1857 et le 10 Mars 1870
François Sévère	Cap-Haïtien	13 Octobre 1848		
Michel Roche	Jacmel	13 Octobre 1848		
Chéry Alcindor	Jérémie	13 Octobre 1848		réélu le 13 Octobre 1857
Zamor père	Gonaïves	13 Octobre 1848		réélu le 20 Juillet 1857
Julien Mathon	Cap-Haïtien	13 Octobre 1848		
Lévçillé aîné	Cayes	13 Octobre 1848		

== Presidents ==
=== Senate ===
Name	Took office	Left office	Party
David Troy	? – March 1846	March 1846 – ?	
Pierre Louis Bouzi	? – 1848	1848 – ?	
André Jean Simon	? – September 1849	September 1849–?	
Larouchel du Bas-de-Sainte-Anne	?	?	
Désormes Ls. Lafontant	? – 1852	1852 – ?	

=== House of Representatives ===
Name	Took office	Left office	Party
H.-In. Joseph	? - 1848	1848–?	
Brutus de Jean-Simon	? - September 1849	September 1849–?	
Brutus de Jean-Simon	? - 1852	1852–?	
