= 4th Legislature of the Haitian Parliament =

The 4th Legislature of the Haitian Parliament met from April 1832-March 31, 1837.

== Members ==
=== Senate ===
Name		Took office	Left office	
Joseph Pitre jeune	Port-au-Prince	14 April 1824	14 April 1833	
Antoine Martinez Valdès	Santo-Domingo	28 June 1824	28 June 1833	
Desrivières Chanlatte	Port-au-Prince	14 January 1825	14 January 1834	
Dévalions	Léogâne	24 January 1825	24 January 1834	
François Sambour	Cayes	26 January 1825	26 January 1834	
Jean-Louis Lafontant père	Jacmel	31 January 1825	31 January 1834	
Louis-Auguste Daumec		3 February 1825	3 February 1834	first elected 1806–1809. Did not accept re-appointment in 1815
Pierre-Prosper Rouanez (Romanez)	Port-au-Prince	8 February 1825	8 February 1834	
Fonroë Dubreuil	Cayes	13 January 1826	13 January 1835	
Jean-François Lespinasse	Port-au-Prince	20 January 1826	20 January 1835	
Louis Gabriel Audigé	Port-au-Prince	26 February 1826	26 February 1835	
Jean Colin Castor	Port-au-Prince	21 April 1826	21 April 1835	
Jacques Hyppolyte Laroche	Port-au-Prince	24 April 1826	24 April 1835	
Charles Théodore Cupidon	Port-au-Prince	14 February 1827	14 February 1836	
Fleuran Chevalier	Petit-Trou	6 August 1828	1837	
Gilles Bénèche	Baradères	11 August 1828	1837	
Marie Eth. Eustache Frémont	Port-au-Prince	4 Septembre 1830	1839	
Noël Piron	Port-au-Prince	4 Septembre 1830	1839	
Philippe Laraque	Jérémie	4 Septembre 1830	1839	
Glésil	Cayes	25 September 1830	1839	
Louis Rigaud	Port-au-Prince	10 Octobre 1830	1839	
Lochard aîné	Miragoâne	12 October 1830	1839	
Jean Béchet	Port-au-Prince	17 October 1830	1839	
Jn. Jh. Dieudonné	Port-au-Prince	18 October 1830	1839	
François Domingue Labbée	Cayes	26 October 1830	1839	
Joseph Georges	Port-au-Prince	8 December 1830	1839	
Louis Alin	Port-de-Paix	6 Juin 1832	1841	
Antoine Paret	Jérémie	3 July 1833	1842	
Alexis Beaubrun Ardouin	Port-au-Prince	17 Juillet 1833	1842	
Pierre André	Port-au-Prince	22 July 1833	1842	
Jean Pierre Oriol	Port-au-Prince	16 Avril 1834		
Désiré Maillard,	Jacmel	5 May 1834		
José Joaquim Delmonte,	Santo-Domingo	21 May 1834		
Joseph Noël,	Cap-Haïtien	23 May 1834		
Emérand Lafontant	Port-au-Prince	30 May 1834		
Charles Bàzelais	Port-au-Prince	4 Juin 1835		
Pierre Louis Bouzi	Port-au-Prince	5 Juin 1835		
Thomas Madiou	Port-au-Prince	19 Septembre 1836		
Jh. Guillaume Longchamp	Cayes	21 Septembre 1836		
Louis Lézeaux jeune, Aquin	Aquin	5 October 1836		
Jean-Jacques Sully, Cayes	Cayes	19 October 1836		

== Presidents ==
=== Senate ===
Name	Took office	Left office	Party
Joseph Georges	? – 1832	1832	
Louis Gabriel Audigé	1832	1832 – ?	
Jean Béchet	? – 1833	1833 – ?	
Jean-François Lespinasse	? – August 1833	August 1833 – ?	
Jean-Baptiste Bayard	?	1834	
Joseph Georges	June 1834	July 1834	
Noël Viallet	July 1834	1835	
Charles-Théodore Cupidon	1835	June 1835	
Pierre André	July 1835	?	
Louis D. Gilles	1836	August 1836	
Eustache Frémont	September 1836	October 1836	
Jean-Pierre Oriol	November 1836	?	

=== House of Commons ===
Name	Took office	Left office	Party
J. S. Milscent	? - 1832	1832	
G. Malval	1832	1832–?	
J. S. Milscent	? - September 1833	June 1835–?	
