= Guy Joseph Bonnet =

Haitian historian and major general

- Born: c. 1773
- Died: 1843
- Known for: Major General of the Army of the Republic of Haiti
- Scientific career
- Fields: History

Guy Joseph Bonnet (c. 1773 – 1843) was a Haitian historian and a major general of the Army of the Republic of Haiti. He was one of the signers of the Haitian Act of Independence, which formally declared Haiti independent from French colonial rule. He is known for his historical book Souvenirs Historiques (Historical Memories), published posthumously in 1864.

== Early life ==
Bonnet's date of birth is unknown with dates given of 1772 and 1773. His own memoirs give the year as 1775 and the place as Léogâne in French Saint-Domingue (Haiti). Bonnet was of mixed race; his mother was a free black and his paternal grandfather was a French merchant from Nantes.

== Revolution ==
Bonnet supported the French Revolution and joined the Haitian Revolution in 1791. He was close to André Rigaud who led the revolution in the south of the colony and was a political rival to Toussaint Louverture who led it in the north. Bonnet went to France in 1797 to defend Rigaud against accusations made by Louverture. On his return to Haiti he took part in the War of the South (also known as the War of the Knives), supporting Rigaud against Louverture. Upon Louverture's victory Bonnet fled to Cuba.

Bonnet returned to Haiti after French troops arrived in early 1802 and began excluding blacks from positions of influence. Bonnet joined his old friend and fellow revolutionary Alexandre Pétion in fighting against the French. Although he initially accepted the overall leadership of Jean-Jacques Dessalines he turned against him after the 1804 massacres of white captives. In his memoirs Bonnet stated that he played a key role in organising Dessalines's assassination.

== Republic of Haiti ==
Bonnet attempted to incorporate French republican ideals into the constitution of the Republic of Haiti. The country quickly split, with Pétion controlling the republic in the south and Henri Christophe establishing the State of Haiti in the north. Bonnet supported Pétion, though he opposed many of his policies and considered he lacked drive. Bonnet served as the republic's Minister of Finance from 1808 to 1810. He was insistent on careful management of the country's finances and implemented control measures used by the French Ancien Regime.

Bonnet's disagreements with Pétion led him to leave the country for the United States. After three years in exile he treturned to serve in the government of Pétion's successor, Jean-Pierre Boyer. Bonnet took credit for Boyer's 1825 scheme of reimbursing former French plantation owners for their seized land, in exchange for the restored French kingdom's recognition of Haiti. From then until his death, just before the 1843 overthrow of Boyer by Charles Rivière-Hérard, Bonnet commanded the district of Saint-Marc.
