= Kely Bastien =

Haitian politician

Kely Bastien is a Haitian politician and former president of the Parliament of Haiti.

He was born 1965 in Acul-du-Nord, and is a physician by profession. He served as the president of the Chamber of Deputies in 1990s. He was elected to the Senate of Haiti in 2006 as LESPWA party candidate. He was elected as the president of the Senate of Haiti from 2008 to 2011. A member of president René Préval's LESPWA party, he was trapped in rubble following the 2010 Haiti earthquake, but was found alive and transported to the Dominican Republic for treatment.
