= Étienne Élie Gerin =

Haitian politician

Etienne Elie Gérin (December 19, 1757 – January 18, 1810) was a Haitian military and politician.

== Biography ==
He was a general of the Armée indigène and later the Haitian army. During the reign of Jean-Jacques Dessalines, he served as the minister of war. On October 11, 1806, he issued a monarch's obedience and joined the troops centered around Henri Christophe, Alexandre Pétion and Laurent Férou seeking to overthrow Dessalines' empire. After the murder of Dessalines (17 October 1806), along with the other leaders of the rebellion, he decided about the need to pass a new constitution and to call the Constituent Assembly [5]. He became a deputy in the assembly [6], but did sign the text of the constitution, because he was on the day of its adoption (October 27, 1806) at the Southern Department [7]. When the Haitian state fell into two independent political creations, he took the side of Pétion's southern Republic. He was in favor of taking decisive military action against Christophe [8]. Mentioned as one of the main candidates for the office of President on March 9, 1807, he eventually lost to Pétion [9]. As one of the most important politicians opposed to the president, he responded to the appeal of the Republican general Andre Lamarre, besieged in Môle Saint-Nicolas. He sent him a ship loaded with food. The Senate thanked him for this gesture, citing him in his composition. Several dozen days later, Gérin submitted a mandate, wanting to express his opposition to the policy of the Presidential Palace.
