= 2nd Legislature of the Haitian Parliament =

The 2nd Legislature of the Haitian Parliament met from April 1822-March 31, 1827. During this period, the Legislature governed the entire island.

== Members ==
=== Senate ===
Name		Took office	Left office	
Noël Viallet		28 April 1817	28 April 1826	
Antoine Lerebours		24 September 1821	24 September 1830	
Louis-Auguste Daumec		3 February 1825	3 February 1834	first elected 1806-1809. Did not accept re-appointment in 1815
Pierre-Prosper Rouanez (Romanez)	Port-au-Prince	8 February 1825	8 February 1834	
François Sambour	Cayes	26 January 1825	26 January 1834	
Pierre François Birot	Port-au-Prince	23 July 1822		
Jean Rigolet,	St. Marc	23 July 1822		
Eliacin Dupuche	Port-au-Prince	21 October 1822	21 October 1831	
Coquière Dupiton	Port-au-Prince	28 October 1822	28 October 1831	
Joseph Pitre jeune	Port-au-Prince	14 April 1824	14 April 1833	
Antoine Martinez Valdès,	Santo-Domingo	28 June 1824	28 June 1833	
Desrivières Chanlatte	Port-au-Prince	14 January 1825	14 January 1834	
Dévalions	Léogâne	24 January 1825	24 January 1834	
Jean-Louis Lafontant père	Jacmel	31 January 1825	31 January 1834	
Fonroë Dubreuil	Cayes	13 January 1826	13 January 1835	
Jean-François Lespinasse	Port-au-Prince	20 January 1826	20 January 1835	
Louis Gabriel Audigé	Port-au-Prince	26 February 1826	26 February 1835	
Jean Colin Castor	Port-au-Prince	21 April 1826	21 April 1835	
Jacques Hyppolyte Laroche	Port-au-Prince	24 April 1826	24 April 1835	
Charles Théodore Cupidon	Port-au-Prince	14 February 1827	14 February 1836	

=== Chamber of Representatives ===
Name	Commune
Caminero	
Beaubrun Ardouin	
Franco Travieso	
P. Muzaine	
M. Duval	
Jean Benis	
Jacques Depa	
P. Junca	
V. Verdier	
Lapaquerie	
Chenet	
P. Larose	
Dougé aîné	
J. Petiny	
Désormeaux	
J. LaSale	
Velasco	
R. Roque	
Papilleau jeune	
Labissiére	
Cadilhon	

== Leaders ==
=== Senate ===
Name	Took office	Left office	Party
Antoine Lerebours	? – October 1822	October 1822–?	
Noël Viallet	? – July 1824	February 1825–?	
Louis-Auguste Daumec	? – April 1825	April 1825 – ?	
Noël Viallet	? – January 1826	April 1826	
Pierre-Prosper Rouanez	April 1826	May 1826 – ?	
François Sambour	1827	1827 – ?	

=== Chamber of Representatives ===
Name	Took office	Left office	Party
Caminero	? - October 1822	1825–?	
Beaubrun Ardouin	? - January 1826	January 1826–?	
Franco Travieso	? - 1826	1826–?	
P. Muzaine	? - 1826	1826–?	
M. Duval	? - 1827	1827	
Jean Benis	1827	1827	
Jacques Depa	1827	1827–?	
