= 6th Legislature of the Haitian Parliament =

The 6th Legislature of the Haitian Parliament met from April 6, 1842-Sept. 1843. The legislature was suspended by the coup led by Charles Rivière-Hérard, and was replaced by a Council of State from 1843 to 1847.

== Members ==
=== Senate ===
Name	District	Took office	Left office	Notes
Antoine Paret	Jérémie	3 July 1833	1842	
Alexis Beaubrun Ardouin	Port-au-Prince	17 July 1833	1842	
Pierre André	Port-au-Prince	22 July 1833	1842	
Jean Pierre Oriol	Port-au-Prince	16 April 1834	1843	
Désiré Maillard	Jacmel	5 May 1834	1843	
José Joaquim Delmonte	Santo-Domingo	21 May 1834	1843	
Joseph Noël,	Cap-Haïtien	23 May 1834	1843	
Emérand Lafontant	Port-au-Prince	30 May 1834	1843	
Charles Bàzelais	Port-au-Prince	4 June 1835		
Pierre Louis Bouzi	Port-au-Prince	5 June 1835		
Thomas Madiou	Port-au-Prince	19 September 1836		
Jh. Guillaume Longchamp	Cayes	21 September 1836		
Louis Lézeaux jeune	Aquin	5 October 1836		
Jean-Jacques Sully	Cayes	19 October 1836		
Jean-Claude Michel jeune	Jacmel	20 April 1838		
Rozier Decossard	Jérémie	2 May 1838		
Jérôme Chardavoine	Cayes	4 September 1839		
Tassy aîné	Cap-Haïtien	7 October 1839		
Calice Bonneau	Port-au-Prince	11 October 1839		
Philippe César	Grand Goâve	14 October 1839		
Gabriel Dallon	Arcahaie	16 October 1839		
Guillaume Chegaraye	Cayes	23 October 1839		
Alexandre Bouchereau	Port-au-Prince	18 April 1840		
Pierre Bineau	Anse-à-Veau	17 June 1840		
Michel Charles jeune	Mirebalais	26 July 1841		
Héraux aîné	Cap-Haïtien	26 July 1841		
Jean Daguerre, Port-au-Prince	Port-au-Prince	20 April 1843		
Lunley Ch. Cerisier	Port-au-Prince	20 Avril 1843		
Jean-Paul	Port-au-Prince	4 May 1843		re-elected 1847
Louis Séguy Vilvaleix aîné	Port-au-Prince	4 May 1843		
Paul Emile Berthonieux	Port-au-Prince	13 June 1843		
Jean Michel Corvoisier	Gonaïves	15 June 1843		
Jean Bénis	Petit-Goâve	15 June 1843		

== Council of State Members ==
Name	District	Took office	Left office	Notes
David Troy	Port-au-Prince	13 January 1845		
Joseph Courtois	Port-au-Prince	13 January 1845		
Noël Piron	Port-au-Prince	13 January 1845		
Jean-Julien Dasny Labonté	Port-au-Prince	13 January 1845		
Auguste Elie	Port-au-Prince	13 January 1845		
Joseph François	Jacmel	13 January 1845		
André Jean-Simon	Miragoâne	13 January 1845		
Cinus Marion aîné	Cayes	13 January 1845		
Jean Joseph Rameau père	Cayes	13 January 1845		
Salomon père	Cayes	13 January 1845		
Philibert Laraque	Jérémie	13 January 1845		
Jean-Baptiste Dupuy	Gonaïves	13 January 1845		
François Genty	Cap-Haïtien	13 January 1845		
Nemours Pierre-Louis	Cap-Haïtien	13 January 1845		re-elected 2 May 1846
Belonière Petionny	Cap-Haïtien	13 January 1845		
Cerres et Valcin Gaudin	Gonaïves	22 February 1845		
Louis Hector	Borgne	22 February 1845		re-elected 20 July 1858
Nicolas Célestin, Lapointe	Saint-Marc	22 February 1845		
François Lacruz	Cap-Haïtien	22 February 1845		re-elected 10 November 1855
Céligny Ardouin	Port-au-Prince	16 April 1845		
Hilaire Jean-Pierre	Cap-Haïtien	16 May 1845		re-elected 13 October 1849 and 13 October 1857
Pierre François Toussaint	Port-au-Prince	1 August 1845		re-elected 16 September 1849 and 20 July 1858
Applys fils	Port-de-Paix	1 August 1845		
Fils-Aimé Obas	Limbe	1 August 1845		
François Balmire	Jérémie	1 March 1846		
Turenne Guerrier	Saint-Marc	1 March 1846		
Jn. -Louis Nicolas fils	Cayes	1 March 1846		re-elected 25 August 1855
Numa Paret	Jérémie	1 March 1846		
Alexandre Bouchereau	Port-au-Prince	1 March 1846		
Chancy Ducayette	Port-au-Prince	1 March 1846		
Cauvin aîné	Port-au-Prince	1 March 1846		
Philippeaux fils	Petit-Trou	16 March 1846		
Paul	Saint-Marc	16 March 1846		
Guerrier Prophète	Trou, (Nord).	16 March 1846		
Maximilien Zamor	Port-au-Prince	22 March 1846		
Alexis Beaubrun Ardouin	Port-au-Prince	22 March 1846		
Jean-Paul	Port-au-Prince	22 March 1846		re-elected 6 April 1847
Antoine François Bance père	Port-au-Prince	22 March 1846		
Aplys père	Cap-Haïtien	22 March 1846		
Victorin Plésance	Port-au-Prince	9 June 1846		re-elected 10 November 1855
Damien Delva	Port-au-Prince	20 June 1846		
Jean Michel	?	20 June 1846		
J. Corvoisier	Gonaïves	11 July 1846		
Salomon jeune	Cayes	11 July 1846		
François Capois	Port-de-Paix	13 September 1846		12 November 1856
Ls. de Gonzague Latortue	Cap-Haïtien	16 October 1846		
Edouard Hall	Cayes	16 October 1846		
Thermidor Jean-Bart	Cayes	16 October 1846		
