= Noël Emmanuel Limage =

Haitian politician

Noël Emmanuel Limage (died January 20, 2007) was a Haitian senator with the Lespwa party. In the 2006 election, he won a seat representing Artibonite in the senate, but was killed in a car accident near Gonaïves less than a year after taking office. He was driving his car on a rural road when he swerved to avoid a cow and crashed into a ravine. He was taken to a hospital, where he died of head injuries. Two passengers in the car survived the accident; Limage's secretary suffered a broken leg and his cousin escaped uninjured.

The Constitution of Haiti stipulated that a special election should have been held within thirty days of Limage's death to fill his senate seat. Because Haiti lacks a permanent electoral commission, the special election did not take place and his seat remains empty. The position will be contested in the upcoming 2008 elections.
