= Bernard Sansaricq =

Haitian politician

Bernard Sansaricq was an American politician of Haitian origin who served as president of the Haitian Senate, backed by the Haitian Army, from February to October 1994.

== Biography ==
Sansaricq was born on 17 May 1944 in Les Cayes. He was a conservative politician and closely allied to the Haitian Army. He was appointed president of the Senate in February 1994. His Senate faction and leadership was not internationally recognized. After the democratically elected Jean-Bertrand Aristide returned to Haiti in October 1994, Sansaricq left and moved to Florida.

Sansaricq ran for the U.S. Congress in Florida's 23rd congressional district. He was a Republican activist and voted for Donald Trump in 2016.

Sansaricq died on 11 July 2023.
