= Bruno Blanchet =

Bruno Blanchet (French pronunciation: [bʁyno blɑ̃ʃɛ]; c. 1760–1822) was secretary of state of the Republic of Haiti.

== Political context ==
By nationalizing the land left abandoned by French planters, Jean-Jacques Dessalines incurred the enmity of those who sought to become landowners based on their family ties. Blanchet was fired from his post as treasurer of Jérémie and became an agent of Henri Christophe tasked with convincing general Nicolas Geffrard to lead an insurrection against Dessalines, who was assassinated by his collaborators on 17 October 1806 in Pont-Rouge north of Port-au-Prince.

During the secession of the North of Haiti by King Henry, the South of the country became a republic under the military authority of Alexander Pétion. During the first months of 1807, there was no civilian leader of the new republic.

== Political responsibility ==
Bruno Blanchet took part in the Constituent Assembly on 18 December 1806. He was one of the dominant voices in the crafting of a democratic constitution with a rigid separation of powers between the Senate and the President, which Pétion thought Christophe would not accept. It was adopted by the national assembly on 27 December 1806. As expected, Christophe did not accept the terms of this new Constitution, refused the presidency and subsequently tried but failed to take Port-au-Prince in early January 1807. Pushed back by Pétion's army, he retreated to his stronghold in the North leaving the position of president vacant.

Bruno Blanchet was named Secretary of State on 19 January 1807.

On 10 March 1807, Alexander Pétion officially became President of the Republic and appointed Bruno Blanchet Secretary General of the Government.

== Bibliography ==
- Dubois, Laurent (2012). Haiti: The Aftershocks of History. New York: Picador.
- Gaffield, Julia (October 2015). "The "States of Hayti" and the British Empire". Haitian Connections In the Atlantic World: Recognition after Revolution. University of North Carolina Press. doi:10.5149/northcarolina/9781469625621.003.0006.
- Madiou fils, Thomas (1848). Histoire d'Haiti: tome troisième (in French). Port au Prince: J. Courtois.
