= Louis Leroux =

French footballer (born 2006)

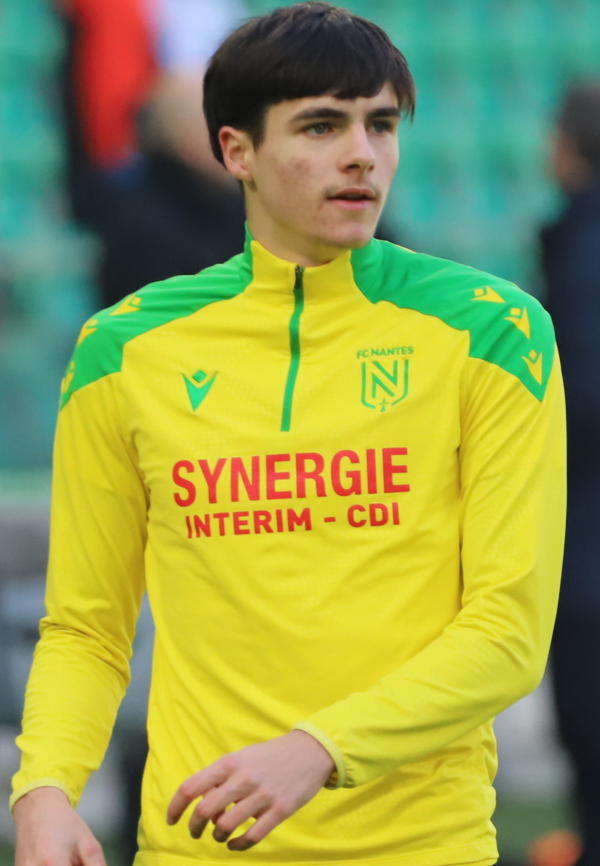
- Leroux with Nantes in 2025

Personal information
- Date of birth: 23 January 2006 (age 20)
- Place of birth: Le Longeron, France
- Height: 1.84 m (6 ft 0 in)
- Position: Midfielder

Team information
- Current team: Nantes
- Number: 19

Youth career
- 2011–2019: AS Longeron
- 2019–2023: Nantes

Senior career*
Years	Team	Apps	(Gls)
2023–	Nantes II	16	(1)
2024–	Nantes	48	(4)

International career^{‡}
2025–	France U20	4	(1)
2025–	France U21	3	(1)
- * Club domestic league appearances and goals as of 7 November 2026 ‡ National team caps and goals as of 13 October 2025

Louis Leroux (born 23 January 2006) is a French professional footballer who plays as a midfielder for Ligue 2 club Nantes.

== Club career ==
Leroux is a youth product of AS Longeron and Nantes, and signed a trainee contract with Nantes until 2026. In 2023 he was promoted to Nantes' reserves, and he started training with their senior side in 2024. He made his senior and professional debut with Nantes as a substitute in a 3–1 Ligue 1 win over Montpellier on 31 August 2024.

== Playing style ==
Leroux is left-footed. Get Football News France note his role as a key player. Writing for Le Télégramme, Nelson Scout highlights his intelligence and vision on the pitch.

== Career statistics ==
As of match played 7 November 2026

Appearances and goals by club, season and competition
Club	Season	League			Cup		Europe		Other		Total	
Club	Season	Division	Apps	Goals	Apps	Goals	Apps	Goals	Apps	Goals	Apps	Goals
Nantes B	2023–24	National 3	13	0	—		—		—		13	0
Nantes B	2024–25	National 3	3	1	—		—		—		3	1
Nantes B	2025–26	National 3	0	0	—		—		—		0	0
Nantes B	Total		16	1	—		—		—		16	1
Nantes	2024–25	Ligue 1	16	2	2	0	—		—		18	2
Nantes	2025–26	Ligue 1	23	1	0	0	—		—		23	1
Nantes	2026–27	Ligue 2	9	1	1	1	—		—		10	2
Nantes	Total		48	4	3	1	—		—		51	5
Career total			64	4	3	1	0	0	0	0	67	6

== Honours ==
Nantes U19

- Championnat National U19: 2022–23

France U20

- Maurice Revello Tournament: 2025
