= Rodolphe Joazile =

Haitian politician

Jean Rodolphe Joazile (born 15 September 1962) is a Haitian politician who served as president of the Senate from January 2011 to January 2012.

He was born on 15 Septembre 1962 in Ferrier. He works as lawyer. He was elected to the Senate of Haiti in 2009 from Fusion party. In 2012 he was appointed as minister of defence.
