= Ronald Larêche =

Haitian politician

Ronald Larêche is a Haitian politician who served as president of the Senate from February 2016 to January 2017.

Larêche was born in 1971. He is from Mont-Organisé. He is a lawyer, and has a law degree from the faculty of law of Cap-Haïtien. He joined the Haitian National Police in November 1995. He resigned from the police in 2005 to become a candidate for deputy of Mont-Organisé district.

Larêche was elected to the Senate in 2015 from Vérité party. He was the vice president of the Senate when Senate President Jocelerme Privert was elected as interim president, and was elected Senate president on his own right in July 2016.
