= Andris Riché =

Haitian politician

Andris Riché (born 15 September 1947) is a Haitian politician who served as president of the Senate from January 2015 to January 2016.

He was born on 15 September 1947 in Dame Marie City. He works as pastor. He was elected to the Senate of Haiti in 2006 from ALTENATIV party. Later he was political advisor of President Jovenel Moïse.
