= Alexandre Pétion =

Haitian army officer and statesman (1770–1818)

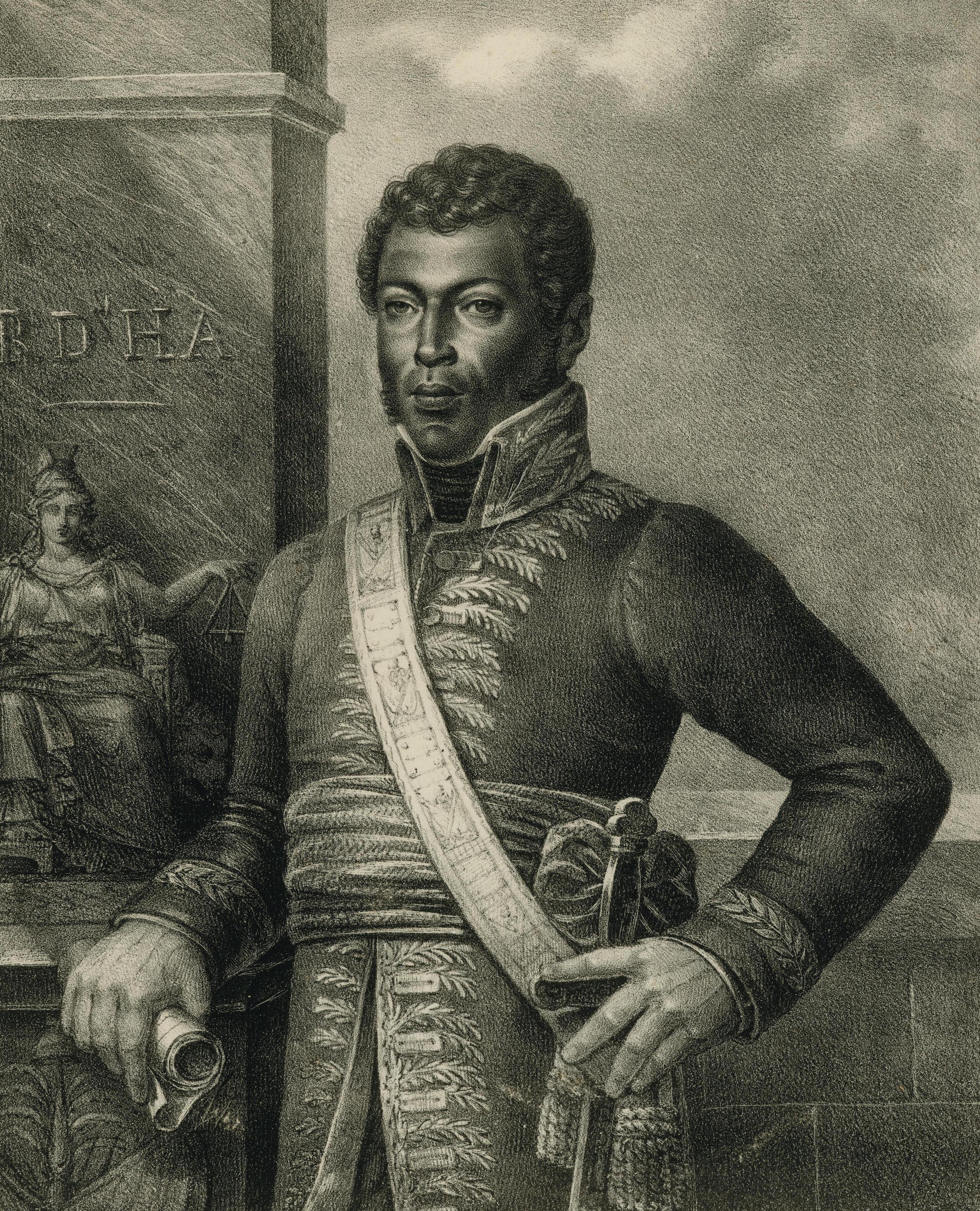
- Portrait of Pétion

1st President of Haiti
- In office 10 March 1807 – 29 March 1818
- Preceded by: Jacques I (as Emperor of Haiti); Henri Christophe (as President of the State of Haiti)
- Succeeded by: Jean-Pierre Boyer

Personal details
- Born: Anne Alexandre Sabès; 2 April 1770 Port-au-Prince, Saint-Domingue
- Died: 29 March 1818 (aged 47) Port-au-Prince, South Haiti
- Spouse: Marie-Madeleine Lachenais
- Military career
- Allegiance: French First Republic; First Empire of Haiti; Republic of Haiti
- Branch: French Revolutionary Army; Indigenous Army; Haitian Army
- Service years: 1791–1803
- Rank: General
- Conflicts: Haitian Revolution

Alexandre Sabès Pétion (French pronunciation: [alɛksɑ̃dʁ sabɛs petjɔ̃]; 2 April 1770 – 29 March 1818) was a Haitian army officer and statesman who served as the first president of the Republic of Haiti from 1807 until his death in 1818. One of Haiti's founding fathers, Pétion belonged to the revolutionary quartet that also includes Toussaint Louverture, Jean-Jacques Dessalines, and his later rival Henri Christophe. Regarded as an excellent artilleryman in his early adulthood, Pétion would distinguish himself as an esteemed military commander with experience leading both French and Haitian troops. The 1802 coalition formed by him and Dessalines against French forces led by Charles Leclerc would prove to be a watershed moment in the decade-long conflict, eventually culminating in the decisive Haitian victory at the Battle of Vertières in 1803.

== Early life ==
Pétion was born "Anne Alexandre Sabès" in Port-au-Prince to Pascal Sabès, a wealthy French father and Ursula, a free mulatto woman, which made him a quadroon (a quarter African ancestry). Like other gens de couleur libres (free people of color) with wealthy fathers, Pétion was sent to France in 1788 to be educated and study at the Military Academy in Paris.

In Saint-Domingue, as in other French colonies such as Louisiane, the free people of color constituted a third caste between the whites and enslaved Africans. While restricted in political rights, many received social capital from their fathers and became educated and wealthy landowners, resented by the petits blancs, who were mostly minor tradesmen. Following the French Revolution, the gens de couleur led a rebellion to gain the voting and political rights which they believed were due them as French citizens; this was before the 1791 slave rebellion. At that time, most free people of color did not support freedom or political rights for slaves.

== Haitian Revolution ==
Pétion returned to Saint-Domingue as a young man to take part in the Haitian Revolution, participating in skirmishes with British forces in Saint-Domingue. There had long been racial and class tensions between the gens de couleur and enslaved and free blacks in Saint-Domingue, where the enslaved black population outnumbered the white and gens de couleur by ten to one. During the years of warfare against French planters (commonly referred to as grands blancs), racial tensions in Saint-Domingue were exacerbated in competition for power and political alliances.

When tensions arose between full blacks and mulattoes, Pétion frequently supported the mulatto faction. He allied with André Rigaud and Jean-Pierre Boyer against Toussaint Louverture in the War of the South, which began in June 1799. By November, Rigaud's forces were pushed back to the strategic southern port of Jacmel by Louverture's army; the defence was commanded by Pétion. The town fell in March 1800 and the conflict was effectively over. Pétion, along with Boyer and other mulatto officers who had fought for Rigaud, went into exile in France alongside Rigaud himself.

In February 1802, General Charles Leclerc arrived with a large fleet transporting 32,000 French troops to retake Saint-Domingue from Louverture's control. Petion, Boyer, and Rigaud returned with him in the hope of securing power in the colony.

Following the deportation of Toussaint Louverture to France and continued resistance to the French takeover, Pétion joined the rebels in October 1802. This followed a secret conference at Arcahaie, where Pétion supported Jean-Jacques Dessalines, the general who had captured Jacmel. The rebels took the capital of Port-au-Prince on 17 October 1803. Dessalines proclaimed independence on 1 January 1804, naming the nation Haiti. On 6 October 1804, Dessalines declared himself ruler for life and was crowned Emperor of Haiti as Jacques I.

== Post-revolution ==
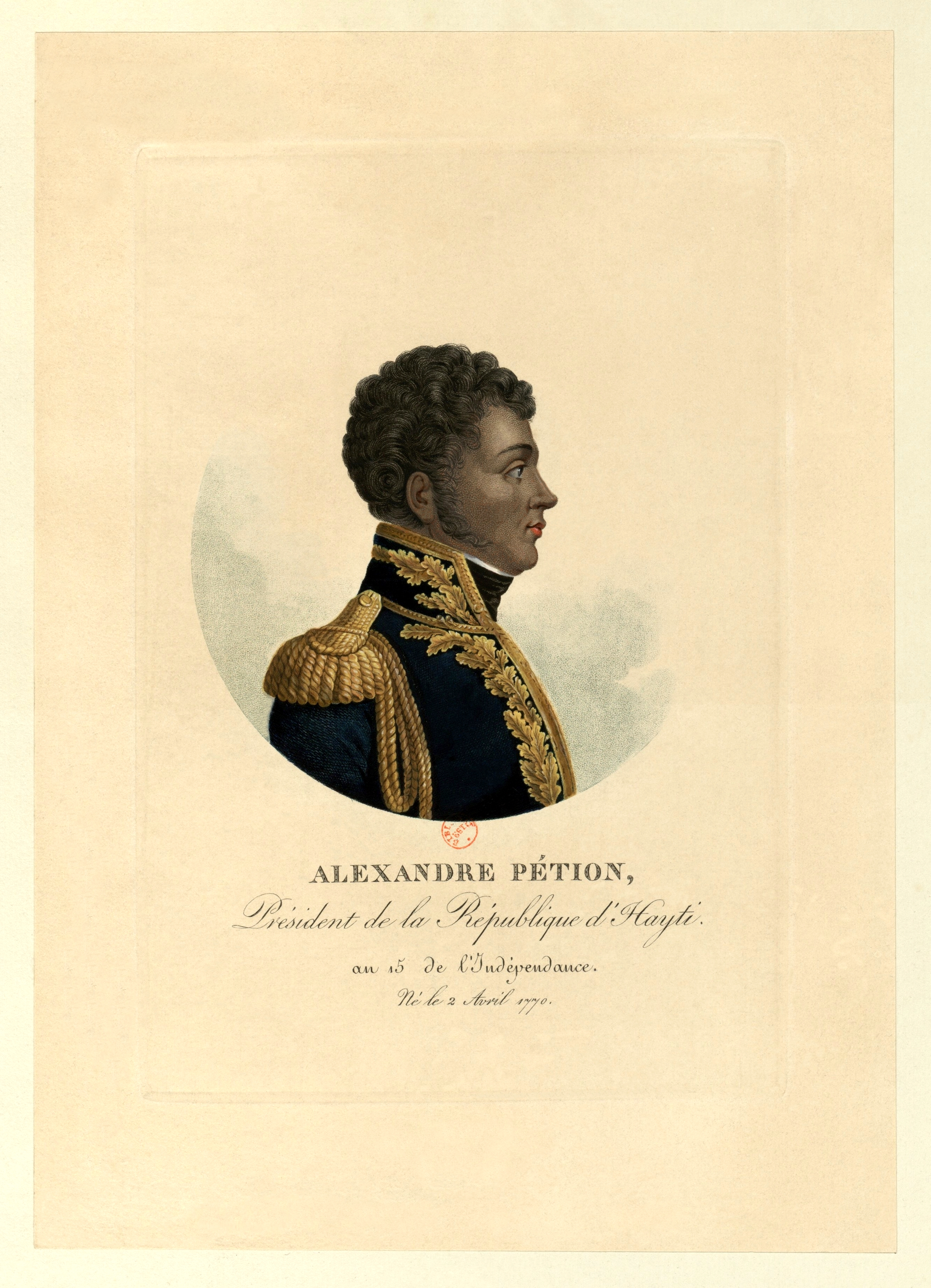
Alexandre Pétion

Disaffected members of Emperor Dessalines's administration, including Pétion and Henri Christophe, began a conspiracy to overthrow Dessalines. Following the assassination of Dessalines on 17 October 1806, Pétion championed the ideals of democracy and clashed with Henri Christophe who wanted absolute rule. Christophe was elected president, but he did not believe the position had sufficient power, as Pétion kept powers for himself. Christophe went to the north with his followers and established an autocracy, declaring the State of Haiti. The loyalties of the country divided between them, and the tensions between the blacks and mulattoes of the North and South, respectively, were reignited.

Pétion was elected President in 1807 of the southern Republic of Haiti. After the inconclusive struggle dragged on until 1810, a peace treaty was agreed to, and the country was split in two. In 1811, Christophe made himself king of the northern Kingdom of Haiti.

On 2 June 1816, Pétion modified the terms of the presidency in the constitution, making himself president for life. Initially a supporter of democracy, Pétion found the constraints imposed on him by the senate onerous and suspended the legislature in 1818.

Pétion seized commercial plantations from the rich gentry. He had the land redistributed to his supporters and the peasantry, earning him the nickname Papa Bon-Cœur ("good-hearted father"). The land seizures and changes in agriculture reduced the production of commodities for the export economy. Most of the population became full subsistence farmers, and exports and state revenue declined sharply, making survival difficult for the new state.

Believing in the importance of education, Pétion started the Lycée Pétion in Port-au-Prince. Petion's virtues and ideals of freedom and democracy for the world (and especially slaves) were strong, and he often showed support for the oppressed. He gave sanctuary to the independence leader Simón Bolívar in 1815 and provided him with material and infantry support. This vital aid played a defining role in Bolivar's success in liberating the countries of what would make up Gran Colombia. Petion was reported to be influenced by his (and his successor's) lover, Marie-Madeleine Lachenais, who acted as his political adviser.

Pétion named General Boyer as his successor as president of the Republic of Haiti; he took control in 1818 following the death of Pétion from yellow fever. After Henri Christophe of the Kingdom of Haiti and his son died in 1820, Boyer reunited the nation under his rule.

== Death and Controversy ==
Alexandre Pétion died on March 29, 1818. While his passing was officially attributed to natural causes, the specific circumstances remain a subject of historical debate, ranging from medical diagnoses to psychological decline.

=== Official Version and Succession ===
By early 1818, Pétion's health had visibly deteriorated. The official record states that he succumbed to yellow fever, a disease endemic to the Caribbean that claimed many lives during that era. Following his death, he was succeeded by his protégé and commander of the Presidential Guard, Jean-Pierre Boyer, in a transition of power that had been previously arranged and was subsequently approved by the Senate.

=== Historical Debates and Alternative Theories ===
The lack of consensus among early Haitian historians has led to two primary alternative narratives regarding his final days:

- Inanition (Self-Starvation): A widely cited theory, supported by accounts in the works of historians like Thomas Madiou, suggests that Pétion fell into a profound state of depression. Overwhelmed by the political stagnation of the Republic and the constant threat from Henri Christophe’s Kingdom in the North, it is alleged that he lost the will to live and died of "inanition" (exhaustion due to lack of nourishment). This psychological decline has been analyzed by modern scholars as a reaction to the failure of his agrarian reforms and the internal betrayal within his administration.
- Political Context and Rumors: Although less documented with evidence, the political climate of 1818 gave rise to various suspicions. Some contemporaries pointed to the psychological toll of his failed efforts to achieve national unity and the immense pressure of maintaining a deficit-ridden treasury. While rumors of poisoning circulated among the populace at the time, most historians, including Beaubrun Ardouin, dismissed these claims, emphasizing instead a combination of chronic fever and a broken spirit.

Political offices
Preceded by Jacques I as Emperor	President of Haiti; 1807–1818	Succeeded by Jean-Pierre Boyer
