= National Assembly (Haiti) =

Bicameral legislature of the Republic of Haiti

National Assembly Assemblée nationale

Type
- Type: Bicameral
- Houses: Senate; Chamber of Deputies

Structure
- Seats: 149 members; (30 senators; 119 deputies)
- Senate political groups: Vacant (30)
- Chamber of Deputies political groups: Vacant (119)

Elections
- Last Senate election: 20 November 2016
- Last Chamber of Deputies election: 20 November 2016
- Next Senate election: 30 August and 6 December 2026
- Next Chamber of Deputies election: 30 August and 6 December 2026

Meeting place
- Legislative Palace, Port-au-Prince

Website
- www.leparlementhaitien.info

The National Assembly (French: Assemblée nationale, Haitian Creole: Asanble Nasyonal) consists of the bicameral legislature of the Republic of Haiti, consisting of the upper house as the Senate (Sénat) and the lower house as the Chamber of Deputies (Chambre des Députés).^{[A88]} Both assemblies conduct legislative sessions at the Haitian capital of Port-au-Prince.^{[A103]}

Since 10 January 2023, every seat in each house is vacant as elections have been repeatedly delayed and the final elected legislators' terms expired on January 10. Many sources call Haiti an anarchy as there have only been two elections in 19 years and the country has been running by presidential decree since 2023.

Additionally, many outlets consider Jimmy Chérizier to be the most powerful man in the country, a gang leader who led the 2024 Haitian jailbreak which resulted in the resignation of Prime Minister Ariel Henry and total control of the nation's capital in his gang's hands.

== History ==
The National Assembly was preceded by the Council of State, a legislative council appointed by the head of state, mostly from among generals. The Council of State was first formed by Jean-Jacques Dessalines under his 1804 imperial constitution. Following his 1806 assassination, his northern general and the new Chief of the Provisional Government Henri Christophe called a Constituent Assembly to meet in Port-au-Prince in November. However, a power struggle ensued between supporters of Christophe and his fellow general Alexandre Petion.

Christophe had sought to ensure a majority of parishes from his power base in the Northern and Artibonite departments in the Assembly, but Petion authorized the election of deputies from parishes in the Western and Southern departments, counteracting Christophe. This resulted in a constitution which was more favorable to Petion's demands for a republican form of government. Under Petion's guidance, the constitution was approved, and the Assembly elected Christophe president and elected a powerful unicameral 24-member Senate.

Christophe and Petion came to violent blows, with Christophe eventually retreating to Cap Francais (now Cap-Haitien) and forming an "Assembly of the mandatories of the people" which elected him president and adopted his own constitution in February 1807. The Senate, meanwhile, met in Port-au-Prince, and formally replaced Christophe with then-Senator Petion as president. This resulted in two separately-governed countries.

Petion eventually tired of the 1806 constitution's limitations on his power, and he eventually drafted a major revision to the constitution in 1816, which established a bicameral parliament, consisting of the House of Representatives of the Communes and the Senate, as well as a separate judicial branch headed by the Tribunal of Cassation. The new parliament also elected Petion president for life, and allowed him to govern more or less by decree. This era, which continued under Petion's successor Jean-Pierre Boyer, ended in 1843, when Boyer resigned and went into exile.

A new provisional government assembled a Constituent Assembly, which drafted a new constitution and restored much of parliament's former power to the Parliament against the new president Charles Rivière-Hérard. But under his successor, Philippe Guerrier, the Parliament was temporarily replaced by a smaller appointed Council of State which held legislative power for the next two years until it was turned into a Senate in 1846 under Jean-Baptiste Riché.

Under the 1964 and 1971 Duvalier constitutions, the body became a unicameral Legislature with the abolition of the Senate. The Senate was subsequently restored in 1988.

== Houses ==
=== Senate ===
The Senate consists of thirty seats, with three members from each of the ten administrative departments. Prior to the creation of the department of Nippes in 2003, there were twenty-seven seats. Senators are elected by popular vote to six-year terms, with one-third elected every two years. After the elections of 2000, twenty-six of the then twenty-seven seats were held by Jean-Bertrand Aristide's Fanmi Lavalas party. The Senate was not in session following the overthrow of Aristide's government in February 2004.

An interim government was put in place following the rebellion, and the remaining Senators were not recognised during that time. The Senate was re-established and elections were held on 21 April 2006. In the Senate elections of 2009 LESPWA won five seats, and five parties won one seat each (OPL, AAA, FUSION, KONBA, UCADDE), as well as an independent.

=== Chamber of Deputies ===
The Chamber of Deputies has 119 members who are elected by popular vote to four-year terms. Candidates from Aristide's Fanmi Lavalas party took seventy-three of the then eighty-three seats in the 2000 elections. Following the coup d'état and the overthrow of the government in February 2004, the Chamber of Deputies remained empty. It was re-established along with the Senate, and elections were held on 21 April 2006.

== National Assembly ==
The National Assembly (French: Assemblée Nationale) is a joint session of Parliament. The National Assembly is convened for specific purposes laid out in the Constitution.^{[A98]}

Meetings of the National Assembly are presided over by the President of the Senate, with the President of the Chamber of Deputies assisting. The Secretaries of the Senate and the Chamber of Deputies also serve as Secretaries of the National Assembly.^{[A99]} The National Assembly building was built in 1949 for the Exposition internationale du bicentenaire de Port-au-Prince and was destroyed during the earthquake on 12 January 2010.

== Legislative Palace ==
The Legislative Palace (French: Palais Législatif) was among the many structures which were virtually destroyed by the earthquake on 12 January 2010. Parliament resumed sitting shortly after the earthquake in a temporary classroom.

On 22 November 2011, the government opened new temporary facilities for the Parliament, built with the help of the USAID program.

On 27 December 2012 the first stone of the new Legislative Palace was laid. The main building, horizontal, of 4 levels, will include 3 large sitting rooms for the 2 Chambers and the National Assembly, the Library of Parliament, the press rooms and several meeting rooms for the Parliamentary Committees and will have a parking for 94 vehicles. The second building, a tower of 9 levels, is going to be equipped with 4 main elevators, a freight elevator and emergency staircase, and will host the individual offices of senators and deputies, including their secretariats, waiting rooms, meeting rooms, space for clerks, toilets, kitchens and a parking of several levels with a capacity of 240 vehicles.

== See also ==
- List of legislatures by country
