= 46th Legislature of the Haitian Parliament =

The following is a list of members and leaders of the 46th Legislature of the Haitian Parliament.

== History ==
=== Elections ===
The parliamentary elections, held on 25 June, 13 August and 17 September 1995, were won by Lavalas. Voter turnout was just 31.09% for the parliamentary elections and 27.8% for the presidential elections. Further parliamentary elections were held on 6 April 1997 for one-third of the seats in the Senate and two seats in the Chamber of Deputies. A total of 45 candidates from 15 parties (including 25 independents) contested the Senate elections.

Only two candidates were elected in the first round, which was marked by a very low turnout. The second round was indefinitely postponed by the Provisional Electoral Council on 21 May due to international pressure from the Organisation of American States and threats of a boycott by the ruling Fanmi Lavalas, which claimed there had been fraud in the first round.

=== Tenure ===
The parliament was sworn in on October 9, 1995. The majority in the parliament, led by Fanmi Lavalas, largely worked in opposition to the structural adjustment and privatization reforms supported by President René Préval. In addition, the parliament worked to delay Préval's nominations for prime minister in return for inclusion of Fanmi Lavalas appointments to cabinet posts. He dissolved the parliament on January 11, 1999 and ruled by decree for the duration of the final year of his presidency.

== Members ==
=== Chamber of Deputies ===
Source.
Deputy	District	Party	Department
Raymonde J Aide	Dessalines	PPL	Artibonite
Axmen Antoine	L’Estère	FNCD	Artibonite
Emmanuel Dérilus	Pte Rivière de l’Artibonite	KONAKOM	Artibonite
Ronald Desormes	Gde. Saline / Desdunes	PPL	Artibonite
Jean Simon Guignard	La Chapelle	PPL	Artibonite
Renold Jules	St. Marc	PPL	Artibonite
Timoléon Louis	Gros Morne	PPL	Artibonite
Verdieu Meltinord	Marmelade / St Michel	PPL	Artibonite
Guy Metayer	Anse Rouge et Terre Neuve	PPL	Artibonite
Jean Laurent Nelson	Gonaives	PPL	Artibonite
André Jérôme Paul	Verrettes	PPL	Artibonite
Raphael V. Wilner	Ennery	PPL	Artibonite
Kenold Delacruz	Thomonde	PPL	Central
Etzer Desarmes	Maissade	PPL	Central
Louis Estiverne	Savanette	IND	Central
Gary Guiteau	Lascahobas	PPL	Central
Gabriël Marseille	Mirebalais	PPL	Central
Josué Salomon	Belladère	PPL	Central
Josué Simoly	Cerca la Source	PPL	Central
Jean B. Voltaire	Hinche	PPL	Central
Jocelin Sanon	Pestel / Beaumont	PPL	Grande Anse
Germain Jean Alix	Abricot / Bonbon	PPL	Grande Anse
Jean Mario Siclait	Jérémie	PPL	Grande Anse
	Anse d’Ainault / les Irois		Grande Anse
Louis Emilio(1) Passe	Dame Marie	FNCD	Grande Anse
Enold Jean-Baptiste	Corail / Roseaux	PPL	Grande Anse
Roland Fils Etienne	Miragoâne / Pte Rivière de Nippes	PPL	Grande Anse
Lorraine C. Besson	Baradères	PPL	Grande Anse
Pressois Germain	Petit Trou de Nippes	PANPRA	Grande Anse
Sain Marc Beaubrun	Moron / Chamberllan	PPL	Grande Anse
César Désir	Anse à Veau /L’Azile	PPL	Grande Anse
	Milot		North
Amas Pierre	Limbé	PPL	North
Joseph Jasmin	Cap-Haitien	PPL	North
Gabriel Ducatel	Borgne et Port-Margot	PPL	North
Edmond Colas	Pignon, Ranquitte / La Victoire	G-MRN	North
Beliard Clerrel	Limonade / Quartier Morin	PPL	North
Kelly C. Bastien	Acul du Nord	PPL	North
Ferdinand François	Grande Rivière du Nord	PPL	North
Bélizaire Danois	Plaisance et Pilate	PPL	North
Jean Guy Marcelin	Saint Raphael / Dondon)	PPL	North
Phylidor Annol	Ouanaminthe / Vallières / Carice / Mombrun Crochu	PPL	North-East
Charles D. Joselito	Fort-Liberté, Ferrier et Perches	PPL	North-East
Martial C. Pierre	Trou du Nord / CaracolG-MRN		North-East
Joseph Jose	Ouanaminthe / Mont Organisé / Capotille	PPL	North-East
Soly Millen	Sainte Suzanne	PPL	North-East
Félix Litz	Terrier Rouge	PPL	North-East
Jacques Garçon	Saint Louis du Nord et Anse à Foleur	PROP	North West
Constantin Arne	Port-de-Paix	PPL	North West
Selondieu Narcelus	La Tortue	PPL	North West
Vasco Thernelan	Môle Saint Nicolas, Bombardopolis et Baie de Henne	PPL	North West
Herny Desamours	Jean Rabel	IND	North West
Momprévil Saint Juste	Bassin Bleu	PPL	North West
Lyonel Bouzi	Ganthier / Fonds Verettes		West
Jean Gasner Douze	Cornillon	KONAKOM	West
Robert Barrais	Petit-Goâve	PPL	West
Ernst Pedro Casseus	Port-au-Prince: 1ère circ.: Zone nord (5)	PPL	West
Alix G. Chateigne	Port-au-Prince: 2ème circ.: Zone Est (4)	PPL	West
Carlo P. Févrius	Arcahaie	PPL	West
Alix Fils-Aimé	Pétion-Ville / Kenscoff	IND	West
Saint Fleur Fritzner	La Gonave	UPD	West
Auguste Jean Garcia	Delmas	PPL	West
Jean Laventure	Port-au-Prince: 3ème circ.: Zone Sud (3)	PPL	West
Eve Rose Pierre	Léogâne	PPL	West
Jean Rod Guerrier (5) Thénord	Croix des Bouquets / Thomazeau	PPL	West
P. J. R Victor	Carrefour	PPL	West
Robert Alerte	Cavaillon / Saint Louis du Sud	PPL	South
Levelt Antoine Altidor	Camp Perrin / Maniche	PPL	South
Habaho Duvinston	Tiburon	PPL	South
Jean Hubert Feuillé	Port-Salut / St Jean du Sud / Arniquet	PPL	South
Gabriël Fortuné	Cayes / l‘Île à Vaches	PPL	South
Jonel Laguerre	Aquin	PPL	South
Antoine Lubin	Chardonnières / Les Anglais	PPL	South
Pierre Paul. Marsan	Port à Piment	PPL	South
Fritz Robert Saint Paul	Torbeck / Chantale	PPL	South
François E. Sylné	Coteaux / Roche à Bateaux	PPL	South
Maxeau Baltazar	Belle Anse	MKN	South-East
Serge Boursiquot	Vallée de Jacmel	PPL	South-East
Félix Jean Délouis	Marigot / Cayes-Jacmel	PPL	South-East
Délima Jean-Claude	Côtes de Fer	PPL	South-East
Paul Aymond Pierre	Bainet	PPL	South-East
Marie Pierre Alex Pradel	Jacmel	PPL	South-East
Pierre Ricard	Thiotte / Grand Gosier / Anse à Pitre)	PPL	South-East

== Leaders ==
=== Senate ===
Name	Took office	Left office	Party
Edgard Leblanc Fils	13 October 1995	March 2000 – ?	OPL

=== Chamber of Deputies ===
Name	Took office	Left office	Party
Fritz Robert Saint Paul	8 November 1995	December 1996–?	
Kely Bastien	14 January 1997	January 1998	
Vasco Thernélan	January 1998	January 1999–?	
