= Jean-Alexis =

Jean-Alexis is a French masculine given name. Notable people with the name include:

- Jean-Alexis Moncorgé, birth name of Jean Gabin (1904–1976), French actor and singer
- Jean-Alexis Rouchon (1801–1878), French printer

== See also ==
- Alexis Jean Fournier (1865–1948) American artist
- Alexis-Jean-Marie Guilloux (1819–1885), French-born Haitian archbishop
- Alexis-Jean-Pierre Paucton (1736–1798), French mathematician
- Jean Achard (painter) (1807–1884; middle name Alexis) French painter
- Jean-Jacques Uhrich (1802 1886; middle name Alexis) French military personnel
- Jean Périer (1869–1954; middle name Alexis), French opera singer and actor
- Jean Tholbert Alèxis (born 1973), Haitian politician
- JA (disambiguation)
