= Robert Manuel =

Robert Manuel may refer to:

- Robert Manuel (veteran) (1935–2017), Korean War veteran
- Robert Manuel (politician) (born 1953), Haitian political figure
- Rob Manuel (born 1973), co-founder of B3ta
- Bobby Manuel (born 1945), American guitarist
- Robert Manuel (baseball) (born 1983), American baseball player
- Robert Manuel (actor) (1916–1995), French actor and film director
