= Pentti Väänänen =

Finnish politician and lawyer (1945–2020)

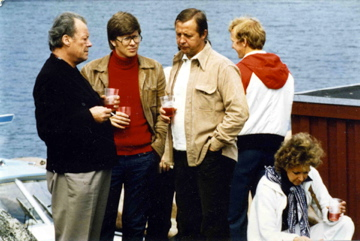
- Pentti Väänänen with Willy Brandt and Kalevi Sorsa in 1977

Deputy Secretary-General of the Parliamentary Assembly of the Organization for Security and Co-operation in Europe
- In office 1999–2004

Secretary-General of the Socialist International
- In office 10 April 1983 – 22 June 1989
- Preceded by: Bernt Carlsson
- Succeeded by: Luis Ayala

Personal details
- Born: 12 February 1945; Keuruu, Finland
- Died: 17 July 2020 (aged 75); Helsinki, Finland
- Party: Social Democratic

Pentti Väänänen (12 February 1945 – 17 July 2020) was a Finnish politician and Master of Laws from the Social Democratic Party of Finland (SDP).

== Career ==
He was a Master of Laws. He worked in the Social Democratic Party of Finland as the secretary for international affairs between 1976 and 1983, and also as an advisor for Prime Minister Kalevi Sorsa from 1980 to 1983. In 1983 Väänänen was elected as the Secretary General of the Socialist International to succeed Bernt Carlsson, and served until 1989. Later he worked in the OSCE Parliamentary Assembly until 2004.

He is also the author of the book Purppuraruusu ja samettinyrkki (in Finnish).ISBN 9789525787115

== Personal life ==
On July 17, 2020, Väänänen died in his sleep with his wife by his side after battling cancer for a year.
