= Robert Manuel (politician) =

Haitian political figure (born 1953)

Robert Manuel (born 1953) is a Haitian political figure who was an unsuccessful nominee to the post of Prime Minister of Haiti in 2008.

Manuel, a commercial architect, is regarded as an authority in law enforcement and security. He served as Secretary of State for Public Safety under President René Préval from 1996 until he resigned at the request of Préval on October 7, 1999. Manuel and police chief Pierre Denize had been strongly opposed by supporters of Jean-Bertrand Aristide, and Aristide's Lavalas party led protests against them in April and May 1999. He left Haiti soon afterwards and alleged that Aristide's supporters were attempting to destabilize the upcoming election. After Aristide was forced out of office during the February 2004 rebellion, Manuel returned to Haiti.

He is considered a friend of Préval, and he was Préval's campaign manager during the February 2006 presidential election, which was won by Préval. During Préval's second term (2006–present), Manuel has served as a presidential adviser. Critics have said that Manuel was behind harsh crackdowns on Aristide supporters.

After Prime Minister Jacques-Édouard Alexis was defeated in a no-confidence vote in April 2008, Préval nominated Ericq Pierre to replace him, but Pierre's nomination was rejected by the Chamber of Deputies on 12 May 2008 due to a technicality with his citizenship papers. Préval then nominated Manuel, a presidential adviser, as prime minister late on May 25 during a meeting with the President of the Senate and the President of the Chamber of Deputies.

The Chamber of Deputies rejected Manuel's nomination by a vote of 57 to 26, with 6 abstentions, on 13 June 2008, noting that he did not own property on Haiti and only registered to vote a day after formally being nominated to the post; both of those are necessary qualifications to becoming prime minister. The main group of deputies rejecting Manuel was the Progressive Parliamentarians Conference (CPP), composed of 52 deputies. Préval had attempted to win the CPP's support for Manuel at a meeting on the previous day. According to CPP spokesman Levaillant Louis Jeune, the group was only trying to "make sure the constitution is respected" in rejecting Manuel's nomination. October 21, 2009, Robert Manuel who speaks fluent Spanish, became ambassador of Haiti in Mexico. During the Haiti earthquake in 2010, Robert Manuel played an important role maintaining the Mexican media updated about the situation in Haiti.
