= Cholzer Chancy =

Haitian politician

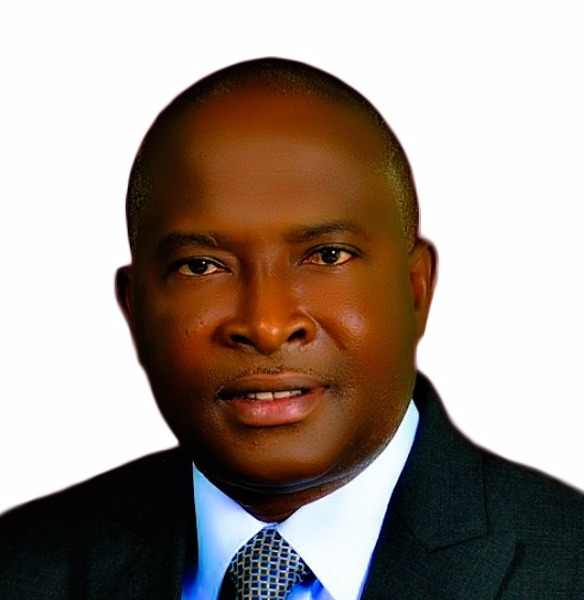

President of the Haitian Chamber of Deputies
- In office 11 January 2016 – 11 January 2018
- Preceded by: Stevenson Jacques Timoléon
- Succeeded by: Gary Bodeau

Personal details
- Born: 16 February 1967 (age 59) Ennery, Artibonite, Haiti
- Party: AAA

Cholzer Chancy (born 16 February 1967) is a Haitian politician. He was President of the Haitian Chamber of Deputies between 11 January 2016 and 11 January 2018. He is a member of the political party Haiti in Action.

== Career ==
Chancy was born on 16 February 1967 in Ennery, Artibonite. His parents were both farmers and Chancy aspired a career in agriculture. Chancy did however not manage to enter the faculty of agriculture at university and instead went to the l'Institut national d'administration, de gestion et des hautes études internationales (INAGHEI) in 1991. After studying Chancy became a businessman and owned a Texaco petrol station.

Chancy ran as a candidate of the party l'espace de concertation for the Chamber of Deputies in the 2000 parliamentary elections, he however retracted his candidacy for the second round. He was elected in the 2006 elections for the party Haiti in Action. Chancy was re-elected in the 2010 elections. During this term he served as president of the Finance commission.

On 11 January 2016, Chancy won the election of Speaker of the Chamber of Deputies, he obtained 46 votes while his opponent Jerry Tardieu of Plateforme Vérité obtained 44 votes. After his election Chancy was involved in seeking a solution to the political crisis in Haiti that occurred after the Presidential term of Michel Martelly had expired, and no new president was elected yet. After a vote in the Chamber of Deputies on 14 February Chancy declared Jocelerme Privert acting president.

In January 2017 Chancy was reelected as Speaker. He was succeeded as Speaker by Gary Bodeau on 11 January 2018.

In January 2024 Chancy was arrested in a corruption case regarding property of the National Center of Equipment in which more than forty public officials were indicted. On 27 March 2024 Chancy was released due to humanitarian reasons by the new judge on the case.

Political offices
Preceded by Stevenson Jacques Timoléon	President of the Haitian Chamber of Deputies; 2016–2018	Succeeded by Gary Bodeau
