= Socialist International =

Political international of socialist, social democratic and labour parties

- Logo

- Light red: Countries with a political party affiliated with the Socialist International; Dark red: Countries with the ruling party affiliated with the Socialist International
- Abbreviation: SI
- Predecessor: Labour and Socialist International
- Formation: 3 June 1951; 75 years ago
- Type: International non-governmental organisation
- Headquarters: Maritime House
- Location(s): Old Town, Clapham, London. SW4 0JW; United Kingdom
- Region served: Worldwide
- Members: 119 political parties and 13 affiliated organisations
- President: Pedro Sánchez
- General-Coordinator: Chantal Kambiwa
- Main organ: Congress of the Socialist International
- Secessions: Progressive Alliance
- Budget: £1.4 million (2014)
- Website: socialistinternational.org

The Socialist International (SI) is a political international consisting mostly of social democratic political parties and labour organisations. The SI was founded in support of democratic socialism, although it has generally moderated over time.

Although formed in 1951 as a successor to the Labour and Socialist International, it has antecedents in the late 19th century. The organisation currently includes 132 member parties and organisations from over 100 countries. Its members have governed in many countries, including most of Europe. In 2013, a schism in the SI led to the establishment of the Progressive Alliance.

The current president is the prime minister of Spain, Pedro Sánchez, elected at the last SI Congress held in Madrid, Spain, in November 2022.

== History ==
=== First and Second Internationals (1864–1916) ===
The International Workingmen's Association, also known as the First International, was the first international body to bring together organisations representing the working class. It was formed in London on 28 September 1864 by socialist, communist and anarchist political groups and trade unions. Tensions between moderates and revolutionaries led to its dissolution in 1876 in Philadelphia.

The Second International was formed in Paris on 14 July 1889 as an association of the socialist parties.

=== Labour and Socialist International (1919–1940) ===
The International Socialist Commission (ISC), also known as the Berne International, was formed in February 1919 at a meeting in Bern by parties that wanted to resurrect the Second International. In March 1919, Communist parties formed the Communist International ("Comintern"), the Third International, at a meeting in Moscow.

Some parties did not want to be a part of the resurrected Second International (ISC) or Comintern. They formed the International Working Union of Socialist Parties (IWUSP, also known as Vienna International, Vienna Union, or Two-and-a-Half International) on 27 February 1921 at a conference in Vienna. The ISC and the IWUSP joined to form the Labour and Socialist International (LSI) in May 1923 at a meeting in Hamburg.

=== Socialist International (1951–present) ===
The Socialist International was formed in Frankfurt in July 1951 as a successor to the LSI.

During the post-World War II period, the SI aided social democratic parties in re-establishing themselves when dictatorship gave way to democracy in Portugal (1974) and Spain (1975). Until its 1976 Geneva Congress, the SI had few members outside Europe and no formal involvement with Latin America. In the 1980s, most SI parties gave their backing to the Nicaraguan Sandinistas (FSLN), whose democratically elected left-wing government was subject to a campaign to overthrow it backed by the United States, which culminated in the Iran–Contra affair after the Reagan administration covertly continued US support for the Contras after such support was banned by Congress.

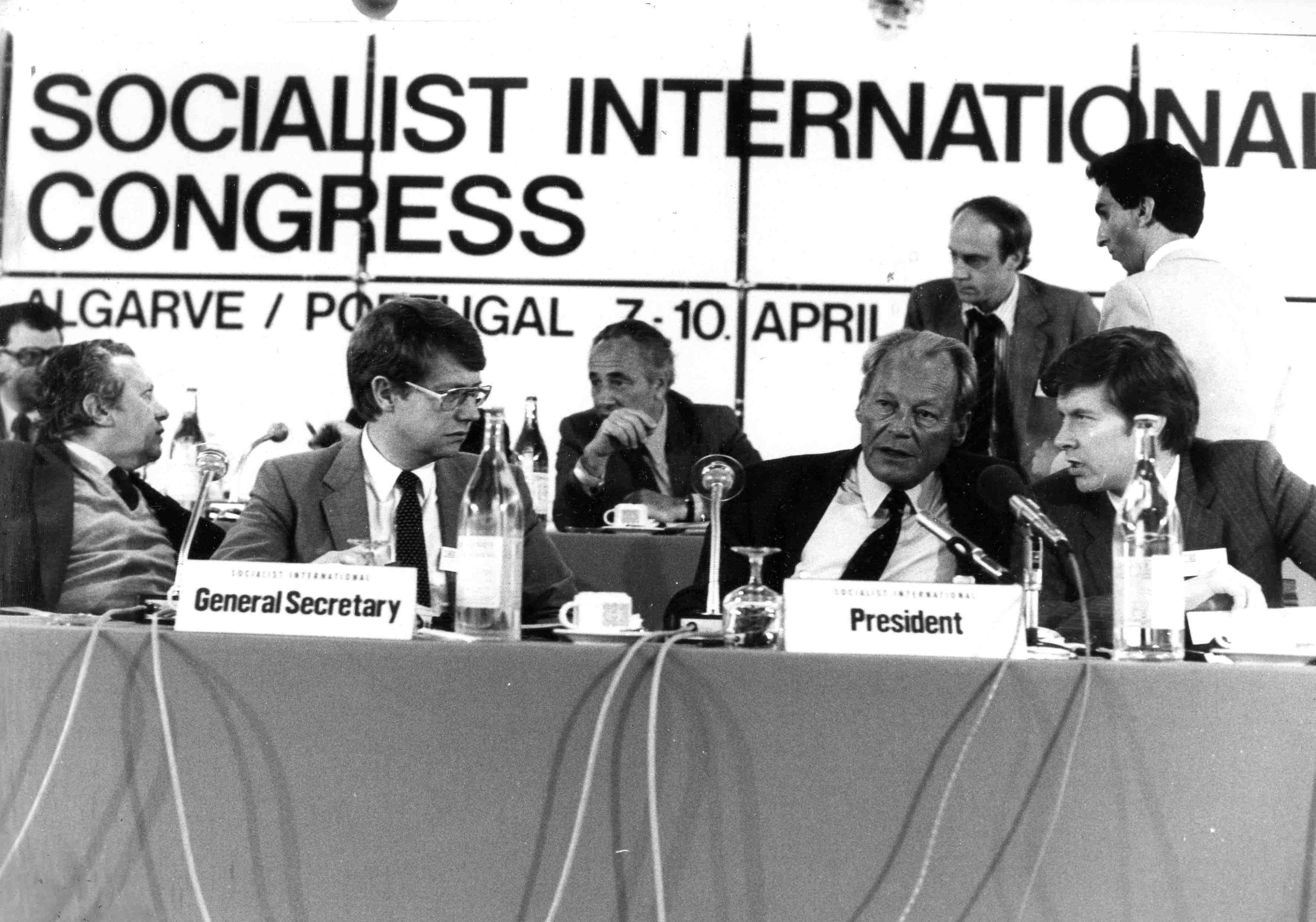
Willy Brandt with outgoing secretary general Bernt Carlsson (left) and new secretary general Pentti Väänänen (right) at the Socialist International Congress in 1983

In the late 1970s and in the 1980s, the SI had extensive contacts and discussions with the two leading powers of the Cold War period, the United States and the Soviet Union, on issues concerning East–West relations and arms control. The SI supported détente and disarmament agreements, such as SALT II, START and INF. They had several meetings and discussions in Washington, D.C., with President Jimmy Carter and Vice President George H. W. Bush and in Moscow with Secretaries General Leonid Brezhnev and Mikhail Gorbachev. The SI's delegations to these discussions were led by the Finnish Prime Minister Kalevi Sorsa.

By the 1980s, the SI had become more favourable to a social democratic or social market economy, rather than a socialist economy, arguing "a 'social market economy' needs to be developed, where economic development and a truly competitive market can be established [...]." In its platform, it states: "markets can and must function as a dynamic way of promoting innovation and signalling the desires of consumers [...]."

The SI sought out a partner in the early days of the Russian Federation. It maintained consultative status with the Social Democratic Party of the Russian Federation while that party lasted.

Following the Tunisian Revolution, the Constitutional Democratic Rally was expelled from the SI in January 2011; later that month the Egyptian National Democratic Party was also expelled; and as a result of the 2010–2011 Ivorian crisis, the Ivorian Popular Front was expelled in March 2011, in accordance with section 7.1 of the statutes of the Socialist International. These decisions were approved at the subsequent SI Congress in Cape Town in 2012 in line with section 5.1.3 of the statutes.

=== Progressive Alliance split (2013) ===
On 22 May 2013 the Social Democratic Party of Germany (SPD) and New Democratic Party of Canada along with some other current and former member parties of the SI founded a rival international network of social democratic parties known as the Progressive Alliance, citing the perceived undemocratic and outmoded nature of the SI, as well as the Socialist International's admittance and continuing inclusion of undemocratic political movements into the organisation. For example, the SPD objected to the continued presence of the Sandinista National Liberation Front and the delayed ouster of the Tunisian Democratic Constitutional Rally and Egyptian National Democratic Party.

=== Relationship with Latin America ===
For a long time, the Socialist International remained distant from Latin America, considering the region as a zone of influence of the United States. For example, it did not denounce the coup d'état against socialist President Jacobo Árbenz in Guatemala in 1954 or the invasion of the Dominican Republic by the United States in 1965. It was not until the 1973 Chilean coup d'état that "a world we did not know" was discovered, explained Antoine Blanca, a diplomat for the French Socialist Party. According to him, solidarity with the Chilean left was "the first challenge worthy of the name, against Washington, of an International which, until then, had done everything to appear subject to American strategy and NATO". Subsequently, notably under the leadership of François Mitterrand, the SI supported the Sandinistas in Nicaragua and other movements in El Salvador, Guatemala, and Honduras in their struggle against US-supported dictatorships.

In the 1990s, it was joined by non-socialist parties that took note of the economic power of the European countries governed or to be governed by their partners across the Atlantic and calculated the benefits they could derive from it. During this period, "the Socialist International works in a clientist way; some parties come here to rub shoulders with Europeans as if they were in the upper class," says Porfirio Muñoz Ledo, one of the representatives of the Party of the Democratic Revolution (Mexico) at the SI. It is home to "the very centrist Argentinean Radical Civic Union (UCR); the Mexican Institutional Revolutionary Party (PRI), which was not very democratically in power for seventy years; the Colombian Liberal Party—under whose governments the left-wing formation Patriotic Union (1986–1990) was exterminated—introduced the neoliberal model (1990–1994) and to which, until 2002, Álvaro Uribe will belong". In the following decade, many left-wing parties that came to power in the Pink Tide, in countries including Brazil, Venezuela, Bolivia, Ecuador, Honduras and El Salvador, preferred to keep their distance from the SI.

=== Left splits ===
As other left-wing parties distanced themselves from the SI, the Socialist Party of Uruguay and the Democratic Socialists of America left the International in 2017 due to SI members having adopted policies favouring austerity, privatisation, deregulation, and capitalism, and rejecting socialism. The former was a founding member of the Progressive Alliance in 2013, and the latter joined the anti-capitalist Progressive International in 2023.

Leashed to the Kremlin by its founder Sergei Mironov, A Just Russia used to be a full member of the Socialist International, but on 7 March 2022 the party was expelled for its support of the Russian invasion of Ukraine.

== Logo ==
The logo is the fist and rose, based on the 1977 design by José María Cruz Novillo for the Spanish Socialist Workers' Party, itself a variant of the logo drawn by Marc Bonnet for the French Socialist Party in 1969. Variants of the emblem are or were used by several SI member parties.

== Presidents, honorary presidents and secretaries general ==
The Presidium is elected to a four-year term of office; there are 25 vice-presidents.

=== Presidents ===
- As of 2025, there have been a total of 9 Socialist International presidents.

No.	Portrait	Name (born–died)	Term of office			Political party	Congress(es)	Country	Ref.
No.	Portrait	Name (born–died)	Took office	Left office	Time in office	Political party	Congress(es)	Country	Ref.
1		Morgan Phillips (1902–1963)	3 July 1951	6 July 1957	6 years, 3 days	Labour Party	I–IV	United Kingdom	
2		Alsing Andersen (1893–1962)	6 July 1957	5 December 1962 #	5 years, 152 days	Social Democratic Party of Denmark	V–VII	Denmark	
3		Erich Ollenhauer (1901–1963)	9 September 1963	14 December 1963 #	96 days	Social Democratic Party of Germany	VIII	West Germany	
4		Bruno Pittermann (1905–1983)	5 September 1964	26 November 1976	12 years, 82 days	Socialist Party of Austria	IX–XII	Austria	
5		Willy Brandt (1913–1992)	26 November 1976	17 September 1992	15 years, 296 days	Social Democratic Party of Germany	XIII–XVIII	West Germany	
6		Pierre Mauroy (1928–2013)	17 September 1992	10 November 1999	7 years, 54 days	Socialist Party	XIX–XX	France	
7		António Guterres (b. 1949)	10 November 1999	15 June 2005	5 years, 217 days	Socialist Party	XXI–XXII	Portugal	
8		George Papandreou (b. 1952)	30 January 2006	25 November 2022	16 years, 300 days	Panhellenic Socialist Movement	XXII–XXV	Greece	
8		George Papandreou (b. 1952)	30 January 2006	25 November 2022	16 years, 300 days	Movement of Democratic Socialists	XXII–XXV	Greece	
9		Pedro Sánchez (b. 1972)	25 November 2022	Incumbent	3 years, 356 days	Spanish Socialist Workers' Party	XXVI	Spain	

=== Honorary presidents ===
Honorary presidents include:

- Mustapha Ben Jafar, Tunisia
- Rubén Berríos, Puerto Rico
- Cuauhtémoc Cárdenas, Mexico
- Tarja Halonen, Finland
- Eero Heinäluoma, Finland
- Isabel Allende, Chile
- Mahamadou Issoufou, Niger
- Lionel Jospin, France
- George Papandreou, Greece
- Miguel Vargas, Dominican Republic

=== Secretaries general ===
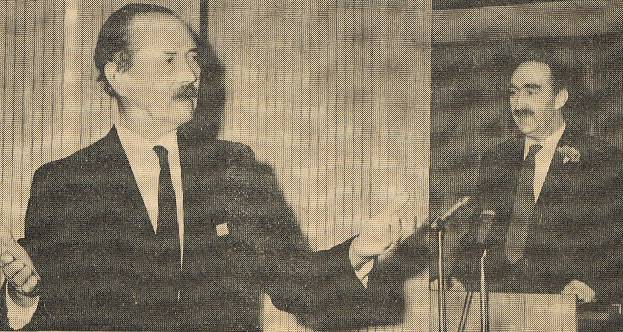
Albert Carthy, secretary general from the United Kingdom from 1957 to 1969

- Julius Braunthal, Austria (1951–1956)
- Bjarne Braatoy, Norway (1956–1957)
- Albert Carthy, United Kingdom (1957–1969)
- Hans Janitschek, Austria (1969–1976)
- Bernt Carlsson, Sweden (1976–1983)
- Pentti Väänänen, Finland (1983–1989)
- Luis Ayala, Chile (1989–2022)
- Benedicta Lasi, Ghana (2022-2024)

=== General Coordinator ===
In February 2024, the SI Council meeting in Madrid established the role of General Coordinator, effectively putting the office of Secretary General on hold:

- Chantal Kambiwa, Cameroon (2024-present)

== Summits ==
- 1951 (Ist): Frankfurt, West Germany.
- 1952 (IInd): Milan, Italy.
- 1953 (IIIrd): Stockholm, Sweden.
- 1955 (IVth): London, United Kingdom.
- 1957 (Vth): Vienna, Austria.
- 1959 (VIth): Hamburg, West Germany.
- 1961 (VIIth): Rome, Italy.
- 1963 (VIIIth): Amsterdam, Netherlands.
- 1964 (IXth): Brussels, Belgium.
- 1966 (Xth): Stockholm, Sweden.
- 1969 (XIth): Eastbourne, United Kingdom.
- 1972 (XIIth): Vienna, Austria (2nd time).
- 1976 (XIIIth): Geneva, Switzerland.
- 1978 (XIVth): Vancouver, Canada.
- 1980 (XVth): Madrid, Spain.
- 1983 (XVIth): Albufeira, Portugal.
- 1986 (XVIIth): Lima, Peru.
- 1989 (XVIIIth): Stockholm, Sweden (2nd time).
- 1992 (XIXth): Berlin, Germany.
- 1996 (XXth): New York City, United States.
- 1999 (XXIst): Paris, France.
- 2003 (XXIInd): São Paulo, Brazil.
- 2008 (XXIIIrd): Athens, Greece.
- 2012 (XXIVth): Cape Town, South Africa.
- 2017 (XXVth): Cartagena, Colombia.
- 2022 (XXVIth): Madrid, Spain (2nd time).

== Members ==
=== Full members ===
There are 93 full members:

Country	Name	Abbr	Government	Notes	Lower House	Upper House
Albania	Socialist Party of Albania	PS	in government	Admitted as consultative member in 1999. Promoted to full member in 2003.	83 / 140 (59%)	
Algeria	Socialist Forces Front	FFS	in opposition	Admitted as consultative member in 1992. Promoted to full member in 1996.	12 / 407 (3%)	4 / 144 (3%)
Andorra	Social Democratic Party	PS	in opposition	Promoted to full member in 2003.	3 / 28 (11%)	
Angola	Popular Movement for the Liberation of Angola	MPLA	in government	Admitted as observer member in 1996. Promoted to full member in 2003.	124 / 220 (56%)	
Argentina	Radical Civic Union	UCR	neither government nor opposition	Admitted as consultative member in 1996. Promoted to full member in 1999.	6 / 257 (2%)	10 / 72 (14%)
Armenia	Armenian Revolutionary Federation	ARF	in opposition	Admitted (as Armenian Socialist Party) as observer member in 1996. Promoted (as ASP) to consultative member in 1999. Promoted (as ASP) to full member in 2003.	10 / 107 (9%)	
Belarus	Belarusian Social Democratic Party (People's Assembly)	BSDP	extra-parliamentary	Admitted as observer member in 1999. Promoted to consultative member in 2003. Promoted to full member in November 2015. Officially deregistered in Belarus since 2005.	0 / 110 (0%)	0 / 64 (0%)
Belgium	Socialist Party	PS	in opposition		16 / 150 (11%)	7 / 60 (12%)
Bolivia	National Unity Front	UN	in government	Promoted to full member in March 2017.	26 / 130 (20%)	7 / 36 (19%)
Bosnia and Herzegovina	Social Democratic Party of Bosnia and Herzegovina	SDP BiH	in government	Admitted as observer member in 1996. Promoted to full member in 1999.	5 / 42 (12%)	0 / 15 (0%)
Brazil	Democratic Labour Party	PDT	independent	Admitted as consultative member in 1986. Promoted to full member in 1989.	17 / 513 (3%)	3 / 81 (4%)
Bulgaria	Party of Bulgarian Social Democrats	PBSD	extra-parliamentary		0 / 240 (0%)	
Bulgaria	Bulgarian Socialist Party	BSP	extra-parliamentary	Admitted as full member in 2003.	0 / 240 (0%)	
Burkina Faso	People's Movement for Progress	MPP	extra-parliamentary	Admitted as full member in 2016.	0 / 127 (0%)	
Cameroon	Social Democratic Front	SDF	in opposition	Admitted as consultative member in 1996. Promoted to full member in 1999.	5 / 180 (3%)	1 / 100 (1%)
Cape Verde	African Party for the Independence of Cape Verde	PAICV	in government	Admitted as consultative member in 1992. Promoted to full member in 1996.	37 / 72 (51%)	
Chad	National Union for Democracy and Renewal	UNDR	in opposition	Admitted as observer member in June/July 2014. Upgraded to full member in 2017.	7 / 188 (4%)	
Chile	Party for Democracy	PPD	in opposition	Admitted as consultative member in 1992. Promoted to full member in 1996.	9 / 155 (6%)	4 / 50 (8%)
Chile	Radical Party of Chile	PR	in opposition		2 / 155 (1%)	0 / 50 (0%)
Chile	Socialist Party of Chile	PS	in opposition	Admitted as consultative member in 1992. Promoted to full member in 1996.	11 / 155 (7%)	7 / 50 (14%)
Colombia	Colombian Liberal Party	PLC	junior party in coalition	Admitted as consultative member in 1992. Promoted to full member in 1999.	24 / 183 (13%)	13 / 103 (13%)
Costa Rica	National Liberation Party	PLN	in opposition	Full member since 1987.	17 / 57 (30%)	
Croatia	Social Democratic Party of Croatia	SDP	in opposition	Admitted as full member in 1999.	37 / 151 (25%)	
Cyprus	EDEK Socialist Party	EDEK	extra-parliamentary	Full member since 1987. Promoted to full member in 1992.	0 / 80 (0%)	
(Northern Cyprus) Cyprus (North)	Republican Turkish Party	CTP	in opposition	Admitted as consultative member in 2008 (pending consultation). Promoted to full member in June/July 2014.	18 / 50 (36%)	
(Northern Cyprus) Cyprus (North)	Communal Democracy Party	TDP	extra-parliamentary	Admitted as consultative member in November 2015. Promoted to full member in March 2017.	0 / 50 (0%)	
Czech Republic	Social Democracy	SOCDEM	extra-parliamentary		0 / 200 (0%)	0 / 81 (0%)
Democratic Republic of the Congo	Union for Democracy and Social Progress	UDPS	in government	Admitted as observer member in 2003. Promoted to full member in January 2019.	69 / 500 (14%)	0 / 108 (0%)
Dominican Republic	Dominican Revolutionary Party	PRD	in opposition	Full member since 1987.	1 / 190 (0.5%)	0 / 32 (0%)
Ecuador	Democratic Left	ID	extra-parliamentary	Member since 1987. Delisted in 2017. Rejoined in 2022.	0 / 151 (0%)	
Egypt	Egyptian Social Democratic Party	ESDP (or HMDI in Arabic)	in opposition	Admitted as consultative member in 2012. Promoted to full member in November 2015. Delisted in 2019 due to non-payment of membership fees. Rejoined in 2024.	12 / 596 (2%)	5 / 300 (2%)
Equatorial Guinea	Convergence for Social Democracy	CPDS	extra-parliamentary	Admitted as consultative member in 1996. Promoted to full member in 1999.	0 / 100 (0%)	
Finland	Social Democratic Party of Finland	SDP	in opposition		43 / 200 (22%)	
France	Socialist Party	PS	in opposition		65 / 577 (11%)	63 / 348 (18%)
Ghana	National Democratic Congress	NDC	in government	Admitted as consultative member in 2003. Promoted to full member in 2008.	184 / 276 (67%)	
Gibraltar	Gibraltar Socialist Labour Party	GSLP	in government (Major party in coalition alliance with GLP)	Became full member in 2025	7 / 17 (41%)	
Greece	PASOK – Movement for Change	PASOK-KINAL	in opposition	Full member since 1990.	32 / 300 (11%)	
Guinea	Rally of the Guinean People	RPG	extra-parliamentary	Admitted (as Guinean People's Assembly) as consultative member in 1999. Promoted (as GPA) to full member in 2003.	0 / 147 (0%)	
Haiti	Fusion of Haitian Social Democrats	PFSDH	extra-parliamentary	Full member since 1989.	0 / 119 (0%)	0 / 30 (0%)
Haiti	Social Democratic Assembly for the Progress of Haiti	RSD	extra-parliamentary	Admitted as full members in 2018	0 / 119 (0%)	0 / 30 (0%)
Hungary	Hungarian Socialist Party	MSzP	extra-parliamentary	Admitted as observer member in 1992. Promoted to full member in 1996.	0 / 199 (0%)	
India	Indian National Congress	INC	in opposition	Originally joined in 1993. Readmitted as full member December 2014.	100 / 543 (18%)	30 / 245 (12%)
Iran	Kurdistan Democratic Party of Iran	KDPI	—N/a	Admitted as observer member in 1996. Promoted to consultative member in 2008. Officially banned in Iran.		
Iraq	Patriotic Union of Kurdistan	PUK	junior party in coalition	Admitted as observer member in 2003. Promoted to full member in 2008.	15 / 329 (5%)	
Ireland	Labour Party		in opposition		11 / 174 (6%)	2 / 60 (3%)
Israel	The Democrats	Democrats	in opposition		8 / 120 (7%)	
Italy	Italian Socialist Party	PSI	extra-parliamentary		0 / 400 (0%)	0 / 200 (0%)
Ivory Coast	Ivorian Popular Front	FPI	in opposition	Admitted as consultative member in 1992. Promoted to full member in 1996. Expelled in March 2011. Rejoined in May 2025.	1 / 255 (0.4%)	0 / 99 (0%)
Jamaica	People's National Party	PNP	in opposition	Full member since 1952. Temporarily demoted to observer member in 2012 due to non-payment of membership fees.	28 / 63 (44%)	8 / 21 (38%)
Japan	Social Democratic Party	SDP	in opposition	Full member since 1951 as the Japan Socialist Party.	0 / 465 (0%)	2 / 248 (0.8%)
Kazakhstan	Nationwide Social Democratic Party	JSDP	in opposition	Admitted as consultative member in 2012. Promoted to full member in November 2015.	8 / 145 (6%)	
Kosovo	Vetëvendosje	LVV	in government	Admitted as observer member in 2018. Promoted to full member in 2024.	53 / 120 (44%)	
Kyrgyzstan	Social Democrats	SDK	extra-parliamentary	Legal successor to the Social Democratic Party of Kyrgyzstan.	0 / 90 (0%)	
Lebanon	Progressive Socialist Party	PSP	in opposition	Full member since 1980.	8 / 128 (6%)	
Lithuania	Social Democratic Party of Lithuania	LSDP	in government	Full member since the 1990s.	52 / 141 (37%)	
Mali	Alliance for Democracy in Mali	ADEMA-PASJ	in opposition	Admitted as consultative member in 1996. Promoted to full member in 1999. Promoted to full member in 2008. Status unclear following the 2020 Malian coup d'état.	24 / 147 (16%)	
Mali	Rally for Mali	RPM	in opposition	Admitted as consultative member in 2003. Status unclear following the 2020 Malian coup d'état.	51 / 147 (35%)	
Malta	Labour Party	PL	in government	Full member since 1955, leading to the entire party being interdicted by the Catholic Church in 1961. Demoted to observer member in 2012 due to non-payment of membership fees. Delisted in December 2014. Rejoined in 2025.	42 / 79 (53%)	
Mauritania	Rally of Democratic Forces	RFD	extra-parliamentary	Admitted as observer member in 2003. Promoted to full member in 2008.	0 / 176 (0%)	
Mauritius	Labour Party	PTR	in government	Full member since 1969.	35 / 66 (53%)	
Moldova	European Social Democratic Party	PSDE	extra-parliamentary	Admitted as consultative member in 2008. Promoted to full member in 2012.	0 / 101 (0%)	
Mongolia	Mongolian People's Party	MPP	in government	Admitted (as Mongolian People's Revolutionary Party) as observer member in 1999. Promoted (as Mongolian People's Revolutionary Party) to full member in 2003.	68 / 126 (54%)	
Montenegro	Democratic Party of Socialists of Montenegro	DPS	in opposition	Admitted as consultative member in 2003. Promoted to full member in 2008.	17 / 81 (21%)	
Montenegro	Social Democratic Party of Montenegro	SDP	extra-parliamentary	Admitted as observer member in 1996. Promoted to consultative member in 1999. Promoted to full member in 2003.	0 / 81 (0%)	
Morocco	Socialist Union of Popular Forces	USFP	in opposition	Promoted to full member in 1992.	26 / 395 (7%)	8 / 120 (7%)
Mozambique	Frelimo Party	FRELIMO	in government	Admitted as consultative member in 1996. Promoted to full member in 1999.	171 / 250 (68%)	
Namibia	South West Africa People's Organisation	SWAPO	in government	Promoted to full member in 2008.	51 / 96 (53%)	39 / 42 (93%)
Nepal	Nepali Congress	NC	in opposition	Admitted as consultative member in 1989. Promoted to full member in 1999.	38 / 275 (14%)	24 / 59 (41%)
Niger	Nigerien Party for Democracy and Socialism	PNDS	in opposition	Admitted as consultative member in 1996. Promoted to full member in 2003. Status unclear following the 2023 Nigerien coup d'état.	79 / 171 (46%)	
North Macedonia	Social Democratic Union of Macedonia	SDUM	in opposition	Admitted as observer member in 1996. Promoted to full member in 2003. Demoted to observer member in 2012 due to non-payment of membership fees. Delisted in December 2014. Rejoined in May 2025.	15 / 120 (13%)	
Pakistan	Pakistan People's Party	PPP	junior partner in coalition	Admitted as consultative member in 1982. Promoted to full member in 2018.	74 / 336 (22%)	26 / 96 (27%)
Palestine	Fatah		in government	Admitted as observer member in 1996. Promoted to consultative member in 1999. Promoted to full member in 2012.	45 / 132 (34%)	
Panama	Democratic Revolutionary Party	PRD	confidence and supply	Admitted as consultative member in 1986. Admitted as consultative member in 1996. Promoted to full member in 2003.	12 / 71 (17%)	
Paraguay	Progressive Democratic Party	PDP	in opposition	Admitted as consultative member in 2008. Promoted to full member in November 2015.	0 / 80 (0%)	1 / 45 (2%)
Peru	Peruvian Aprista Party	PAP	extra-parliamentary	Promoted to full member in 1999.	0 / 130 (0%)	0 / 60 (0%)
Philippines	Philippine Democratic Socialist Party	PDSP	extra-parliamentary	Admitted as consultative member in 1992. Demoted to observer member in 2012 due to non-payment of membership fees. Delisted in December 2014. Reinstated in 2019.	0 / 316 (0%)	0 / 24 (0%)
Portugal	Socialist Party	PS	in opposition		58 / 230 (25%)	
Puerto Rico	Puerto Rican Independence Party	PIP	in opposition	Consultative member in 1987, full member in 1994. Promoted to full member in 1992.	3 / 51 (6%)	2 / 27 (7%)
Romania	Social Democratic Party	PSD	in government	Admitted as consultative member in 1996. Promoted to full member in 1999. PSDR admitted as consultative member in 1992, full member in 2001. Admitted as full member in 2003. Both parties merged into PSD in 2001.	86 / 330 (26%)	36 / 136 (26%)
San Marino	Party of Socialists and Democrats	PSD	junior partner in coalition	Consultative member in 1961, full member in 1980.	8 / 60 (13%)	
Senegal	Socialist Party of Senegal	PS	in opposition	Full member since the 1970s.	1 / 165 (0.6%)	
Serbia	Social Democratic Party of Serbia	SDPS	junior party in coalition	Admitted as observer member in 2018. Promoted to full member in 2024.	6 / 250 (2%)	
Slovakia	Direction – Social Democracy	SMER-SD	in government	Full member.	42 / 150 (28%)	
South Africa	African National Congress	ANC	in government	Admitted as full member in 1999.	159 / 400 (40%)	43 / 90 (48%)
Spain	Spanish Socialist Workers' Party	PSOE	in government	Full member since 1951.	121 / 350 (35%)	91 / 266 (34%)
Tunisia	Democratic Forum for Labour and Liberties	FDTL	—N/a	Admitted as consultative member in 2003. Demoted to observer member in 2012 due to non-payment of membership fees. Promoted to full member in 2012. Boycotted the 2022–23 Tunisian parliamentary election.	0 / 217 (0%)	
Turkey	New Party		in opposition	Following the "absolute nullity" crisis, the Socialist International admitted the New Party in place of the CHP on 2 October 2026, recognizing the judicial removal of the party leadership as an intervention by the ruling government.	91 / 600 (15%)	
Ukraine	Social Democratic Party of Ukraine	SDPU	extra-parliamentary	Admitted as consultative member in 2003.	0 / 450 (0%)	
United Kingdom (Northern Ireland)	Social Democratic and Labour Party	SDLP	in opposition	Admitted as a full member in 1974.	8 / 90 (9%)	
Uruguay	New Space	PNE	in government	Admitted as consultative member in 1999. Promoted to full member in 2003. Party does not individually stand in elections but participates as part of the Broad Front.		
Venezuela	A New Era	UNT	in opposition	Admitted as consultative member in 2013. Promoted to full member in November 2015.	11 / 285 (4%)	
Venezuela	Democratic Action	AD	in opposition	Observer member in 1966, consultative member in 1981, full member mid 1980s.	8 / 285 (3%)	
Yemen	Yemeni Socialist Party	YSP	in opposition	Admitted as observer member in 2003. Promoted to consultative member in 2008. Promoted to full member in 2012.	8 / 301 (3%)	

=== Consultative parties ===
There are 17 consultative parties:

Country	Name	Abbr	Government	Notes	Lower House	Upper House
Botswana	Botswana Democratic Party	BDP	in opposition	Admitted as consultative member in June/July 2014.	4 / 61 (7%)	
Democratic Republic of the Congo	Unified Lumumbist Party	PALU	in opposition	Admitted as observer member in December 2014. Upgraded to consultative member in 2019.	17 / 500 (3%)	2 / 108 (2%)
Djibouti	Movement for Democratic Renewal and Development	MRD	—N/a	Upgraded to consultative member in 2019.		
Eswatini	People's United Democratic Movement	PUDEMO	—N/a	Admitted as consultative member in 2013. Political parties are banned in Eswatini.		
Gabon	Gabonese Progress Party	PGP	—N/a	Admitted as consultative member in 1996.	0 / 143 (0%)	
Gambia	United Democratic Party	UDP	in opposition	Admitted as consultative member in 2012.	15 / 58 (26%)	
Georgia	Social Democrats for the Development of Georgia	SDD	extra-parliamentary	Admitted as consultative member in 2013.	0 / 150 (0%)	
Ghana	Convention People's Party	CPP	extra-parliamentary	Admitted as consultative member in 2018	0 / 275 (0%)	
Guinea-Bissau	African Party for the Independence of Guinea and Cape Verde	PAIGC	in opposition	Admitted as consultative member in 2008.	47 / 102 (46%)	
Iran	Komala Party of Iranian Kurdistan	KPIK	—N/a	Admitted as observer member in 2014 Promoted to consultative member in 2018 Officially banned in Iran.		
Palestine	Palestinian National Initiative	PNI	in opposition	Admitted as observer member in 2008. Promoted to consultative member in 2012.	2 / 132 (2%)	
Palestine	Palestinian Popular Struggle Front	PPSF	junior partner in coalition	Admitted as consultative member in 2018.	0 / 132 (0%)	
Sahrawi Republic	Polisario Front	POLISARIO	in government	Admitted as observer member in 2008. Promoted to consultative member in 2017.	51 / 51 (100%)	
São Tomé and Príncipe	Movement for the Liberation of São Tomé and Príncipe/Social Democratic Party	MLSTP/PSD	in opposition	Admitted as consultative member in 2013.	18 / 55 (33%)	
Syria	Democratic Union Party	PYD	extra-parliamentary	Admitted as consultative member in November 2015.	0 / 250 (0%)	
Togo	Democratic Convention of African Peoples	CDPA	extra-parliamentary	Admitted as consultative member in 1999.	0 / 91 (0%)	
Turkey	Peoples' Equality and Democracy Party	DEM	in opposition		56 / 600 (9%)	

=== Observer parties ===
There are 11 observer parties:

Country	Name	Abbr	Government	Notes	Lower House	Upper House
Chad	Party for Liberties and Development	PLD	in opposition		3 / 188 (2%)	0 / 69 (0%)
Congo-Brazzaville	Congolese Party of Labour	PCT	in government	Admitted as observer member in November 2025.	112 / 151 (74%)	52 / 72 (72%)
Eswatini	Swazi Democratic Party	SWADEPA	—N/a	Admitted as observer member in June/July 2014.		
Kenya	Labour Party of Kenya			Admitted as observer member in 2012.		
Lesotho	Lesotho Congress for Democracy	LCD	junior party in coalition	Admitted as observer member in June/July 2014.	3 / 120 (3%)	
Libya	Future Movement		—N/a	Admitted as observer member in November 2025.		
Mauritania	El Islah		junior party in coalition	Admitted as observer member in November 2025.	6 / 176 (3%)	
Nicaragua	UNAMOS		extra-parliamentary		0 / 92 (0%)	
Sahrawi Republic	Sahrawi Movement for Peace	LCD	—N/a	Admitted as observer member in 2024.		
Somaliland	Justice and Welfare Party	JWP	in opposition	Admitted as observer member in 2013.		
United Kingdom	Labour Party		in government	Member since 1951. Currently holds a majority in Westminster, following the 2024 United Kingdom general election and London Labour holds the London Mayoralty. The party asked to be downgraded to observer status in February 2013 "in view of ethical concerns, and to develop international co-operation through new networks." The request was accepted later that year.	404 / 650 (62%)	209 / 822 (25%)

=== Former members ===
Country	Name	Abbr	Notes
Albania	Social Democratic Party of Albania	PSD	Admitted as consultative member in 1992. Promoted to full member in 1996. Demoted to observer member in 2012 due to non-payment of membership fees. Delisted in December 2014.
Algeria	National Liberation Front	FLN	Expelled following the 2019 Algerian protests.
Andorra	New Democracy	ND	Admitted as consultative member in 1999.
Antigua and Barbuda	Antigua and Barbuda Labour Party	ALP	Admitted as consultative member in 2008.
Argentina	Popular Socialist Party	PSP	Admitted as full member in 1992. Merged with the Democratic Socialist Party to form the Socialist Party.
Argentina	Socialist Party	PS	Full member since 1951.
Azerbaijan	Azerbaijani Social Democratic Party	ASDP	Admitted as observer member in 1996. Promoted to consultative member in 2003. Readmitted as consultative member in June/July 2014. Admitted as full member in 2016. Party dissolved in 2023.
Aruba	People's Electoral Movement	MEP	Promoted to full member in 1992. Full member since 1994. Delisted in December 2014.
Australia	Australian Labor Party	ALP	Admitted as full member in 1966. Delisted in December 2014.
Austria	Social Democratic Party of Austria	SPÖ	Admitted as a full member in 1951. Delisted in 2022.
Barbados	Barbados Labour Party	BLP	Admitted as full member in 1987. Demoted to observer member in 2012 due to non-payment of membership fees. Delisted in December 2014.
Belgium	Belgian Socialist Party	PSB/BSP	Founder member. Split in 1978.
Belgium	Forward		Delisted in 2017.
Benin	Democratic Union of Progressive Forces	UDFP	Admitted as observer member in 1992.
Benin	Social Democratic Party	PSD	Admitted as consultative member in 1999. Promoted to full member in 2003.
Bosnia and Herzegovina	Alliance of Independent Social Democrats	SNSD	Admitted as consultative member in 2003. Promoted to full member in 2008 Expelled in August 2012.
Botswana	Botswana National Front	BNF	Admitted as observer member in 1996.
Bolivia	Revolutionary Left Movement	MIR	Admitted as consultative member in 1986. Consultative member in 1987. Promoted to full member in 1992.
Bulgaria	Bulgarian Euro-Left	BEL	Admitted as observer member in 1999.
Burkina Faso	Party for Democracy and Progress / Socialist Party	PDP/PS	Admitted as full member circa 1995. Demoted to observer member in 2012 due to non-payment of membership fees. Delisted in December 2014.
Burundi	Front for Democracy in Burundi	FRODEBU	Admitted as consultative member in 2003. Demoted to observer member in 2012 due to non-payment of membership fees. Delisted in December 2014.
Canada	Co-operative Commonwealth Federation	CCF	Became the New Democratic Party in 1961.
Canada	New Democratic Party	NDP/NPD	Delisted in 2018.
Central African Republic	Movement for Democracy and Social Progress	MDPS	Admitted as observer member in 1992.
Central African Republic	Movement for the Liberation of the Central African People	MLPC	Admitted as observer member in 2008. Upgraded to full member in 2018.
Iran	Kurdistan Democratic Party	KDP	Admitted as a full member in November 2015. Party dissolved in 2022.
Kyrgyzstan	Social Democratic Party of Kyrgyzstan	SDPK	
Colombia	Alternative Democratic Pole	PDA	Former observer member. Delisted in December 2014.
Colombia	M-19 Democratic Alliance	AD/M-19	Admitted as observer member in 1992.
Curaçao	Partido MAN	MAN	Promoted to full member in 1989. Delisted in 2017.
Denmark	Social Democrats	SD	Founding member. Withdrew in 2017.
Dominica	Dominica Labour Party	DLP	Admitted as consultative member in 1996. Demoted to observer member in 2012 due to non-payment of membership fees. Delisted in December 2014.
Egypt	National Democratic Party	NDP	Admitted as full member in 1989. Full member since 1992. Expelled in January 2011.
El Salvador	Democratic Party	PD	Admitted as observer member in 1996.
Estonia	Social Democratic Party	SDE	Member since 1990. Withdrew in 2017.
Fiji	Fiji Labour Party	FLP	Admitted as consultative member in 1992. Expelled in 2008, due to the party's participation in a government issued from a military coup.
France	French Section of the Workers' International	SFIO	Founding member. Member in 1951–1969.
Georgia	Union of Citizens of Georgia	CUG	Admitted as observer member in 1996. Party disbanded in 2003.
Germany	Social Democratic Party of Germany	SPD	Founding member. Withdrew in 2017.
Greenland	Siumut		Admitted as consultative member in 1986. Demoted to observer member in 2012 due to non-payment of membership fees. Delisted in December 2014.
Guatemala	National Unity of Hope	UNE	Admitted as full member in 2008. Expelled in 2024.
Guatemala	Social Democratic Convergence	CSD	Admitted as consultative member in 2003.
Haiti	Party of the National Congress of Democratic Movements	KONAKOM	Admitted as consultative member in 1992. Promoted to full member in 1996.
Haiti	Struggling People's Organization	OPL	Admitted (as Lavalas Political Organisation) as observer member in 1996.
Haiti	Revolutionary Progressive Nationalist Party	PANPRA	Admitted as consultative member in 1989. Promoted to full member in 1992.
Hungary	Social Democratic Party of Hungary	MSZDP	Member since 1990. Admitted as observer member in 1992. Promoted to consultative member in 1999. Promoted to full member in 2003. Delisted in 2020 due to inactivity
Iceland	Social Democratic Party	A	Member since 1987. Formed Social Democratic Alliance in 2000.
Iceland	Social Democratic Alliance	S	Withdrew in 2017.
Iran	League of Iranian Socialists		Joined in 1960. It was dissolved in 1980s.
Italy	Democratic Party of the Left	PDS	Admitted as full member in 1992. Merged with others to form Democrats of the Left in 1998.
Italy	Democrats of the Left	DS	Full member since 1992 as Democratic Party of the Left. Merged with other movements to form the Democratic Party in 2007. Listed as SI member until XXIV Congress in 2012.
Italy	Italian Socialist Party	PSI	Party dissolved in 1994 and succeeded by the Italian Socialists (who formed the Italian Democratic Socialists in 1998 and resumed as the Italian Socialist Party in 2007).
Italy	Italian Democratic Socialist Party	PSDI	Founding member. Party merged into the Italian Democratic Socialists in 1998 (renamed into Italian Socialist Party in 2007).
Japan	Democratic Socialist Party	DSP/Minsha-tō	Admitted as SI member in 1961. Merged with non-socialist movements to form the New Frontier Party in 1994.
Japan	Japan Socialist Party	JSP/Shakai-tō	Admitted as SI member in 1951. Refounded as the Social Democratic Party in 1996.
Jordan	Jordanian Democratic Party of the Left	JDPL	Admitted as observer member in 2003.
Kyrgyzstan	Ata Meken Socialist Party		Admitted as observer member in 2008.
Latvia	Latvian Social Democratic Workers' Party	LSDSP	Full member since 1994. Demoted to observer member in 2012 due to non-payment of membership fees. Delisted in December 2014.
Latvia	Social Democratic Party "Harmony"	SDPS	Admitted as consultative member in June/July 2014. Withdrew in 2017.
Luxembourg	Luxembourg Socialist Workers' Party	LSAP/POSL	Full member since 1951. Delisted in 2022.
Madagascar	Party for National Unity	VITM	Admitted as consultative member in 1989.
Malaysia	Democratic Action Party	DAP	Full member since 1987. Delisted in 2017.
Mauritius	Mauritian Militant Movement	MMM	Admitted as consultative member in 1996. Promoted to full member in 2003. Delisted in 2022.
Mexico	Institutional Revolutionary Party	PRI	Admitted as consultative member in 1996. Promoted to full member in 2003. Expelled in 2025.
Mexico	Party of the Democratic Revolution	PRD	Admitted as full member in 1996.
Moldova	Social Democratic Party of Moldova	PSDM	Admitted as observer member in 1996.
Mongolia	Mongolian Social Democratic Party	MSDP	Admitted as consultative member in 1992. Promoted to full member in 1996. Merged with others in 2000 to form the Democratic Party.
Namibia	Congress of Democrats	CoD	Admitted as consultative member in 2003. Demoted to observer member in 2012 due to non-payment of membership fees. Delisted in December 2014.
Netherlands	Labour Party	PvdA	Decided to minimise involvement in SI in December 2012. Delisted in December 2014.
New Zealand	New Zealand Labour Party	NZLP	Member since 1952. Demoted to observer member in 2012 due to non-payment of membership fees. Delisted in December 2014.
Nicaragua	Sandinista National Liberation Front	FSLN	Expelled in January 2019 because of violation of human rights during the Nicaraguan protests
Nigeria	All Progressives Congress	APC	Admitted as consultative member in December 2014.
North Vietnam	Vietnamese Socialist Party		Consultative member between 1955 and 1969.
Norway	Labour Party	DNA	Member since 1951. Withdrew in 2016.
Paraguay	Party for a Country of Solidarity	PPS	Admitted as consultative member in 2003. Promoted to full member in 2008.
Paraguay	Revolutionary Febrerista Party	PRF	Admitted as full member in the 1970s.
Philippines	Akbayan		Admitted as consultative member in 2003.
Poland	Democratic Left Alliance	SLD	Full member since 1996. Withdrew in 2017.
Poland	Labour Union	UP	Admitted as full member in 1996. Demoted to observer member in 2012 due to non-payment of membership fees. Delisted in December 2014.
Poland	Social Democracy of the Republic of Poland	SdRP	Admitted as full member in 1996. Absorbed into the Democratic Left Alliance in 1999.
Romania	Democratic Party	PD	Admitted as consultative member in 1996. Promoted to full member in 1999. Merged with the Liberal Democratic Party to form the Democratic Liberal Party.
Russia	A Just Russia — Patriots — For Truth	SRZP	Admitted as observer member in 2008. Promoted to consultative member in 2010. Promoted to full member in 2012. Expelled in March 2022 for its support for the Russian invasion of Ukraine.
Russia	Social Democratic Party of Russia	SDPR	Admitted as consultative member in 2003.
Saint Kitts and Nevis	Saint Kitts and Nevis Labour Party	SKNLP	Admitted as consultative member in 1992. Demoted to observer member in 2012 due to non-payment of membership fees. Delisted in December 2014.
Saint Lucia	Progressive Labour Party		Expelled in 1992.
Saint Lucia	Saint Lucia Labour Party	SLP	Admitted as consultative member in 1992. Demoted to observer member in 2012 due to non-payment of membership fees. Delisted in December 2014.
Saint Vincent and the Grenadines	Saint Vincent Labour Party	SVGLP	Admitted as consultative member in 1989. Merged with the Movement for National Unity in 1994 to form the Unity Labour Party.
Saint Vincent and the Grenadines	Unity Labour Party	ULP	Demoted to observer member in 2012 due to non-payment of membership fees. Delisted in December 2014.
Serbia	Democratic Party	DS	Admitted as consultative member in 2003. Promoted to full member in 2008.
Serbia	Social Democratic Party	SDP	Admitted as consultative member in 2003. Promoted to full member in 2008. Demoted to observer member in 2012 due to non-payment of membership fees. Ceased to exist in 2009
Singapore	People's Action Party	PAP	Resigned in 1976 in response to the Dutch Labour Party's charges of violations of human rights and detention of political prisoners without trial, and DLP and the British Labour Party's charges of media censorship.
Slovakia	Party of the Democratic Left	SDĽ	Admitted as full member in 1996. Merged with Direction – Social Democracy in 2005.
Slovakia	Social Democratic Party of Slovakia	SDSS	Admitted as full member in 1992. Merged with Direction – Social Democracy in 2005.
Slovenia	Slovenian Democratic Party	SDS	Admitted (as the Social Democratic Party of Slovenia) as observer member in 1992.
Slovenia	Social Democrats	SD	Admitted (as United List of Social Democrats) as full member in 1996. Demoted to observer member in 2012 due to non-payment of membership fees. Delisted in December 2014.
Sweden	Swedish Social Democratic Party	SAP	Withdrew in March 2017.
Switzerland	Social Democratic Party of Switzerland	SP/PS	Withdrew in 2017.
Tanzania	Chama Cha Mapinduzi	CCM	Admitted as full member in 2013.
Timor-Leste	Revolutionary Front for an Independent East Timor	FRETILIN	Admitted as consultative member in 2003.
Tunisia	Democratic Constitutional Rally	RCD	Admitted as full member in 1989. Full member since 1993. Expelled in January 2011.
Tunisia	Popular Unity Movement	MUP	Admitted as consultative member in 1989.
Turkey	Democratic Left Party	DSP	Admitted as consultative member in 1986. Expelled in 1992.
Turkey	Peoples' Democratic Party	HDP	Admitted as consultative member. Merged with the Green Left Party to form the Peoples' Equality and Democracy Party.
Turkey	Democratic People's Party	DEHAP	Admitted as observer member in 2003. Merged with the Democratic Society Movement to form the Democratic Society Party which in turn was succeeded by the Peace and Democracy Party.
Turkey	Social Democratic Populist Party	SHP	Admitted as consultative member in 1986. Promoted to full member in 1989. Merged with the Republican People's Party in 1995.
Turkey	Republican People's Party	CHP	Took Social Democratic Populist Party's place in 1995. The Socialist International identified CHP as its member party in June 2026. However, as of July 2026, the Socialist International's online membership directory lists Turkey without naming a member party. On 2 October 2026, the party was completely removed from the membership list and the New Party was admitted in its place.
Ukraine	Socialist Party of Ukraine	SPU	Admitted as consultative member in 2003. Expelled in July 2011.
United States	Democratic Socialists of America	DSA	Had been a member of SI since founding in 1982, withdrew in August 2017.
United States	Democratic Socialist Organizing Committee	DSOC	Member since 1976, merged with the New American Movement in 1982 to form the Democratic Socialists of America, which remained a member until 2017.
United States	Social Democrats, USA	SDUSA	Member since 1972. Withdrew in 2005.
Uruguay	Party for the Government of the People	PGP	Admitted as consultative member in 1992. Merged with the Colorado Party in 1994.
Uruguay	Socialist Party of Uruguay	PSUA	Admitted as full member in 1999. Withdrew in 2017.
Venezuela	For Social Democracy	PODEMOS	Admitted as consultative member in 2008.
Venezuela	Movement for Socialism	MAS	Admitted as consultative member in 2003.
Venezuela	Popular Will	VP	Admitted as full member in December 2014. Expelled in 2024.
Zambia	Patriotic Front	PF	Admitted as consultative member in 2013.
Zimbabwe	Movement for Democratic Change	MDC	Admitted as full member in 2008. Delisted in 2017.

== Fraternal organisations ==
The Socialist International maintains close ties with three fraternal organisations:

- International Falcon Movement – Socialist Educational International (IFM/SEI)
- International Union of Socialist Youth (IUSY)
- Socialist International Women (SIW)

== Associated organisations ==
In addition to its member parties and fraternal organisations, the Socialist International collaborates with a number of associated organisations from across the world:

- Arab Social Democratic Forum (ASDF)
- Euro-Latin American Forum of Progressive and Socialist Parliamentarians
- International Federation of the Socialist and Democratic Press (IFSDP)
- International Labour Sports Confederation (CSIT)
- International League of Religious Socialists (ILRS)
- International Social Democratic Union for Education (ISDUE)
- Jewish Labor Bund (JLB)
- National Democratic Institute for International Affairs (NDI)
- Party of European Socialists (PES)
- Social Democratic Group of the Latin American Parliament
- World Labour Zionist Movement (WLZM)

== See also ==
- French Section of the Workers' International
- Reformism

Leftist Internationals include:

United left wing

- International Workingmen's Association, the First International (1864–1876)

Anarchist

- International Anarchist Congresses: at first with the 1st International; followed by:
  - International Working People's Association, sometimes known as the "Black" International (1881–1887); anarchist
  - International Workers' Association – Asociación Internacional de los Trabajadores IWA–AIT (est. 1922) and the International of Anarchist Federations (IFA; est. 1968), with several spin-offs: Libertarian Communist International (est. 1954), Anarchist International Conference (est. 1958), International Libertarian Solidarity (SIL/ILS) network (est. 2001)

Socialist and labour

- Second International (1889–1916), socialist and labour
- Berne International (est. 1919), socialist
- International Working Union of Socialist Parties (IWUSP), aka 2½ International or Vienna International, founded by Austro-Marxists (1921–1923)
- Labour and Socialist International (1923–1940), created by merger of Vienna and Berne Internationals

Communist

- Communist International, aka Third International or Comintern (1919–1943)

Trotskyist

- Fourth International (1938–1953 schism) led by the International Secretariat (ISFI); followed by Trotskyist internationals
- Fourth International (post-reunification) (since 1963), by reunification of ISFI and parts of the International Committee of the Fourth International (ICFI)

Democratic socialism

- Socialist International (est. 1951)

Reunification efforts

- Fifth International, a phrase referring to socialist and communist groups aspiring to create a new workers' international
