= Luis Ayala (politician) =

Chilean politician

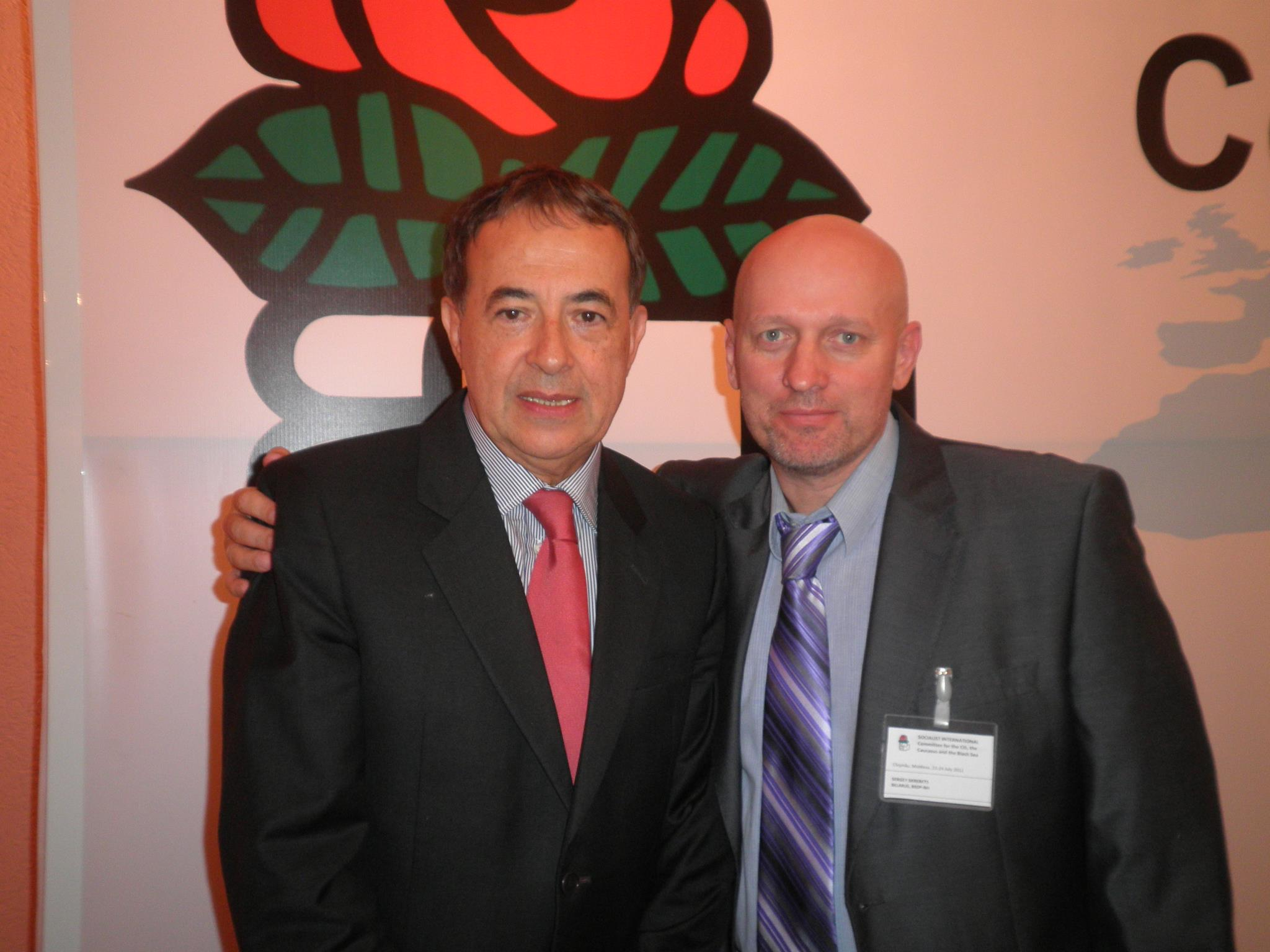
- Luis Ayala (left) with Siarhei Skrabets (2007)

Secretary General of the Socialist International
- In office 22 June 1989 – 27 November 2022
- Preceded by: Pentti Väänänen
- Succeeded by: Benedicta Lasi

Personal details
- Party: Radical Party of Chile

Luis Ayala is a Chilean politician who served as Secretary General of the Socialist International from 1989 to 2022, when he was succeeded by Benedicta Lasi.
