= Thirion =

Thirion is a French surname. Notable people with the surname include:

- André Thirion (1907–2001), French writer
- Pieter Willem Thirion, South African Judge, author of Thirion Report
- Rémi Thirion (b. 1990), French downhill mountain biker
