= Vimy Ridge Day =

Canadian observance

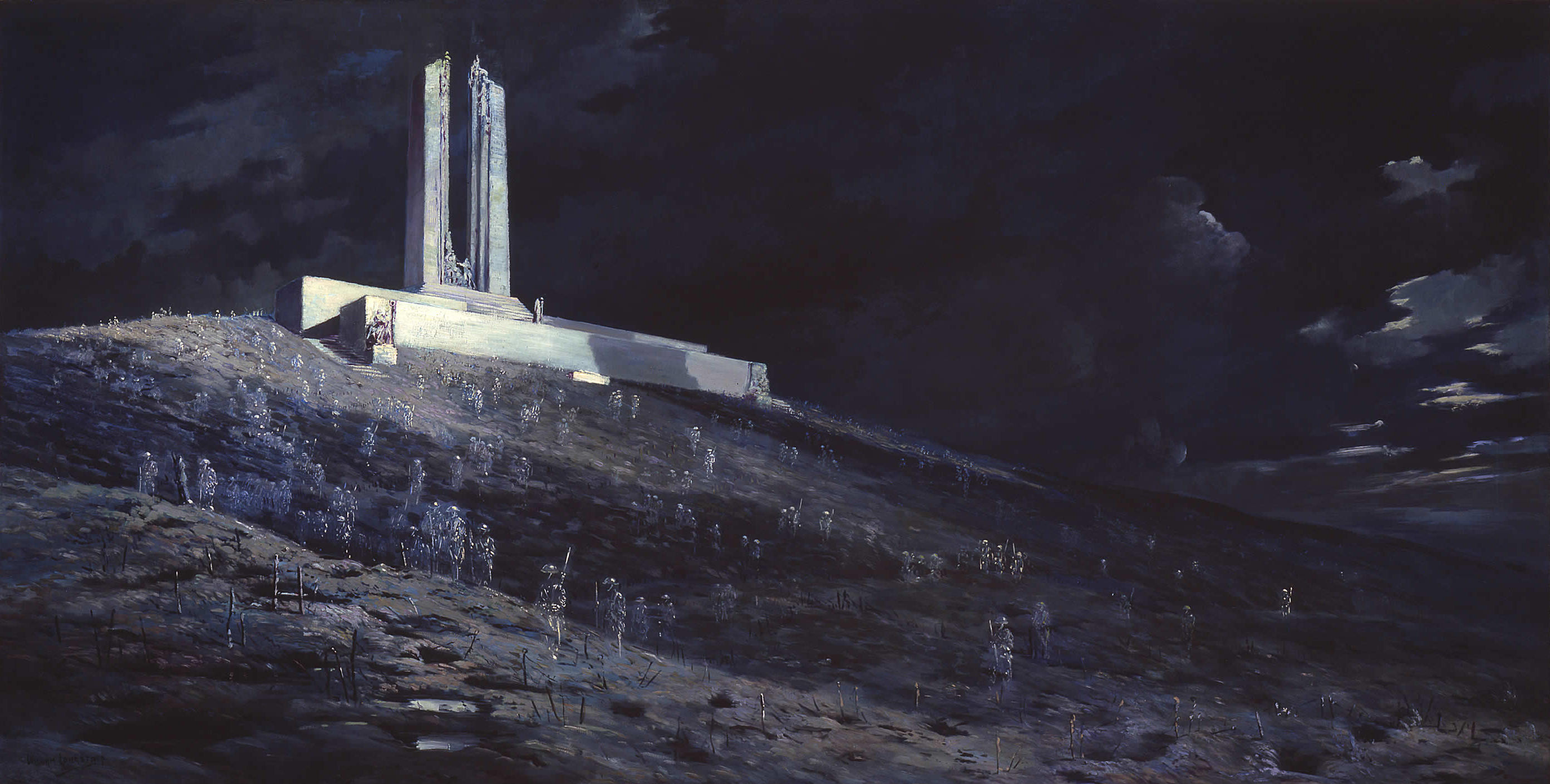
- Ghosts of Vimy Ridge by William Longstaff
- Official name: Vimy Ridge Day
- Observed by: Canada
- Significance: Remembrance of the Battle of Vimy Ridge
- Observances: Canadian flag on the Peace Tower of Parliament Hill in Ottawa lowered to half-mast.
- Date: April 9th
- Next time: 9 April 2027
- Frequency: annual

Vimy Ridge Day is a day to commemorate the deaths and casualties of members of the Canadian Corps in the Battle of Vimy Ridge, which took place during the First World War. The non-statutory observance has been designated to occur annually on 9 April since 2003.

== Introduction ==
In 2003, the Government of Canada declared 9 April to be "Vimy Ridge Day", to honour and remember the Battle of Vimy Ridge which took place during the First World War at Vimy Ridge, France, in 1917. The initiative to create the day of commemoration was spearheaded by Robert Manuel, a Korean War veteran. The annual non-statutory observance was created through passage of Bill C-227, introduced by Brent St. Denis, the Member of Parliament for Algoma-Manitoulin. By law, it is required that the Canadian flag on the Peace Tower of Parliament Hill in Ottawa be lowered to half-mast. Small ceremonies, including the laying of wreaths, also normally take place at the Canadian National War Memorial in Ottawa, the Canadian National Vimy Memorial in France and other areas across Canada.

== Battle ==
For the first time, all four Canadian divisions were to be assembled to operate in combat as a corps. The Canadian divisions were joined by the British 5th Infantry Division, and reinforced by artillery, engineer and labour units. The Canadian Corps was supported to the north by the 24th British Division of I Corps which advanced north of the Souchez river and by the advancing XVII Corps to the south. The attack began at 5:30 a.m. on Easter Monday, 9 April 1917, whereupon every artillery piece at the disposal of the Canadian Corps began firing. Light field guns laid down a barrage which advanced in predetermined increments, often 100 yards (91 m) every three minutes, while medium and heavy howitzers established a series of standing barrages further ahead, against known defensive systems.

The 1st, 2nd and 3rd Canadian Divisions reported reaching and capturing their first objective, the Black Line, by 6:25 a.m. The 4th Canadian Division encountered a great deal of trouble during its advance and was unable to complete its first objective until some hours later. After a planned pause, during which positions were consolidated, the advance resumed. Shortly after 7:00 a.m., the 1st Canadian Division had taken half of its second objective, the Red Line, and moved a brigade forward to mount an attack on the remainder. The 2nd Canadian Division reported reaching the Red Line and capturing the town of Les Tilleuls at approximately the same time. Units at the 3rd Canadian Division reached their section of the Red Line at around 7:30 a.m. However, due to an exposed left flank caused by the failure of the 4th Canadian Division to capture the top of the ridge, the 3rd Canadian Division was forced to stop and establish a divisional defensive flank to its north. It was not until 11:00 a.m. that the defending German 79th Reserve Division mounted a counterattack, by which time only the 4th Canadian Division had not reached its objective.

Three fresh brigades were moved up to the Red Line by 9:30 a.m., 10 April to support the advance whereupon they leapfrogged existing units occupying the Red line and advanced to the Blue Line. By approximately 11:00 a.m., the Blue Line, including Hill 135 and the town of Thélus, had been captured. The advance briefly halted, the artillery barrage remaining stationary for 90 minutes to give troops time to consolidate the Blue Line and bring supporting machine guns forward. Shortly before 1 p.m., the advance recommenced with the Brown Line being secure around 2:00 p.m. By this point only the northern half of Hill 145 and "the Pimple", a fortified highpoint outside of Givenchy-en-Gohelle, remained under German control. Fresh troops finally forced the remaining German troops from the northern half of Hill 145 at around 3:15 p.m and by nightfall of 10 April, the only objective not yet achieved was the capture of "the Pimple". Supported by a significant amount of artillery and the 24th British Division of I Corps to the north, the 10th Canadian Brigade attacked the hastily entrenched German troops and captured "the Pimple" on 12 April, bringing an end to the battle. By nightfall on 12 April 1917 the Canadian Corps was in firm control of the ridge.

The corps had suffered 10,602 casualties; 3,598 killed and 7,004 wounded. The German Sixth Army suffered an unknown number of casualties with an approximate 4,000 men becoming prisoners of war. Four Victoria Crosses, the highest military decoration awarded to British and Commonwealth forces for valour, were awarded to members of the Canadian Corps and at least two Orders Pour le Mérite, the Kingdom of Prussia's highest military order, were awarded to German commanders. The Germans did not attempt to recapture the ridge, including during the Spring Offensive, and it remained under British control until the end of the war.

== See also ==
- Vimy Award
- Vimy Ridge (march)
- Robert Manuel (veteran)
