= Gary Bodeau =

Haitian politician (born 1977)

President of the Haitian Chamber of Deputies
- In office 10 January 2018 – 13 January 2020
- Preceded by: Cholzer Chancy
- Succeeded by: Vacant

Member of the Chamber of Deputies for Ouest
- In office 11 January 2016 – 13 January 2020

Personal details
- Born: 18 November 1977 (age 48) Port-au-Prince, Haiti
- Party: Parliamentary Alliance for Haiti (APH)

Gary Bodeau (born 18 November 1977) is a Haitian politician who served as President of the Haitian Chamber of Deputies from 10 January 2018 to 13 January 2020.

On April 5, 2023, he was sanctioned for corruption by the U.S. Department of the Treasury.

== U.S. Treasury Sanctions ==
On April 5, 2023, the U.S. Department of the Treasury sanctioned Bodeau pursuant to Executive Order (E.O.) 13818, for his extensive involvement in corruption in Haiti. According to the OFAC designation, Bodeau was involved in several corrupt schemes wherein he engaged in efforts to influence the outcome of Haitian political appointments, including facilitating and soliciting bribes worth millions of dollars. In 2018, Bodeau paid Haitian officials to secure their votes while seeking ministerial position appointments. He also solicited a large bribery payment worth hundreds of thousands of dollars from senior government officials in exchange for his political support. In 2019, Bodeau offered to deliver a successful vote in Haiti’s Chamber of Deputies for a prospective ministerial appointee in exchange for millions of dollars paid out through individual payments to members of the Chamber of Deputies. Several Haitian businessmen provided between 500 and 600 million Haitian gourdes (approximately $6.2-$7.4 million) to members of the Chamber of Deputies to influence the outcome of a ministerial vote. In advance of the floor session, Bodeau participated in discussions on the vote and payments with various members of the Chamber of Deputies.

Political offices
Preceded by Cholzer Chancy	President of the Haitian Chamber of Deputies; 2018–2020	Vacant
