= Rudy Hériveaux =

Haitian politician

Rudy Hériveaux is a Haitian politician who served as President of the Chamber of Deputies.

Hériveaux was first elected member of the Chamber of Deputies in 2000. He was President of the Chamber of Deputies from 28 February 2002 to January 2003. He was a member of pro-Aristide Fanmi Lavalas party, but was ostracized from the party by March 2005. Hériveaux was arrested in October 2004 following the coup d'état, and was jailed for three months.

In 2006, Hériveaux was elected to the Senate of Haiti as a Lavalas member.

Hériveaux was appointed minister of communications in the cabinet of President Michel Martelly in April 2014.
