= Duly Brutus =

Haitian politician

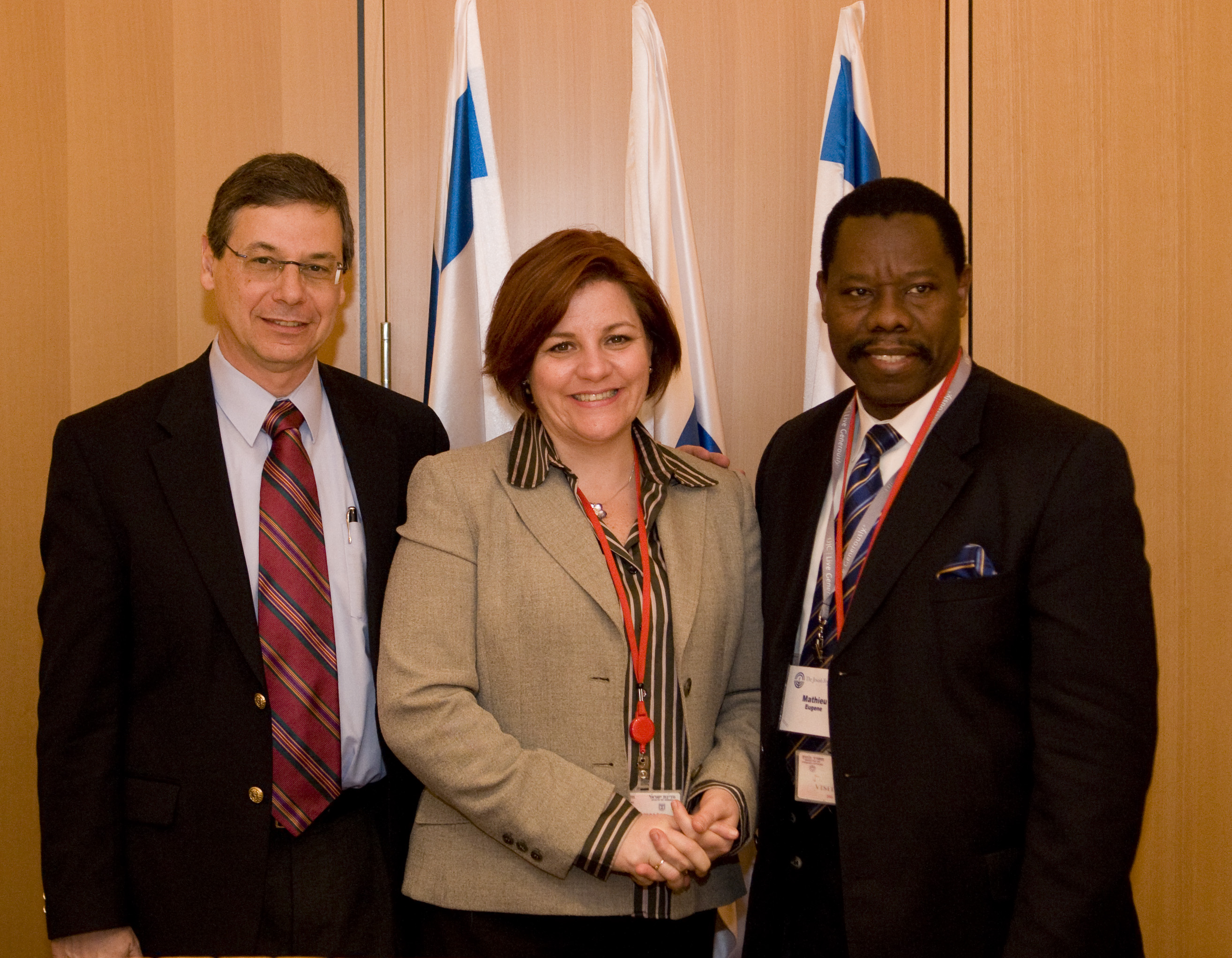
Brutus on right

Pierre Duly Brutus is a Haitian politician who served as President of the Chamber of Deputies and minister of foreign affairs.

Brutus was a member of a left-wing Revolutionary Progressive Nationalist Party (PANPRA) party. He was elected President of the Chamber of Deputies from 20 August 1991 to 1992, and again from 1994 to 1995. Brutus was the permanent representative of Haiti to OAS from 2004 to 2014. He was appointed as the minister of foreign affairs from April 2014 to 2015 under the presidency of Michel Martelly. He resigned in order to run in the 2015 presidential elections.

As of 2020, Brutus has retired and is living in Florida, United States.
