= Bernt Carlsson =

Swedish diplomat (1938–1988)

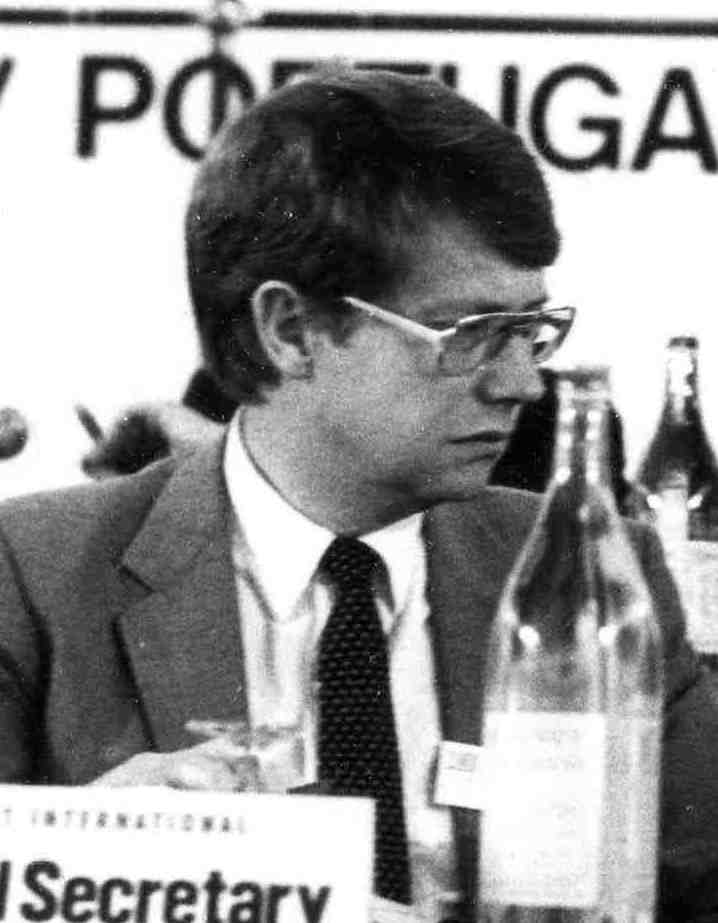
Carlsson at the Socialist International Convention, April 1983

Bernt Wilmar Carlsson (21 November 1938 – 21 December 1988) was a Swedish social democrat and diplomat who served as Assistant-Secretary-General of the United Nations and United Nations Commissioner for Namibia from July 1987 until he died on Pan Am Flight 103, which was blown up over Lockerbie, Scotland, on 21 December 1988. Abdelbaset al-Megrahi was subsequently convicted of 270 counts of murder in connection with the bombing and sentenced to life imprisonment.

== Social democrat ==
A native of Stockholm, Carlsson joined the Swedish Social Democratic Youth League when he was sixteen, studied economics at Stockholm University and, upon graduation, went into Sweden's foreign ministry. He worked as assistant to the Minister of Commerce in 1967 and was assigned to be international secretary of the ruling Social Democratic Party of Sweden in 1970. Concurrent with his position in the party, Prime Minister Olof Palme appointed him as a special adviser.

== Socialist International ==
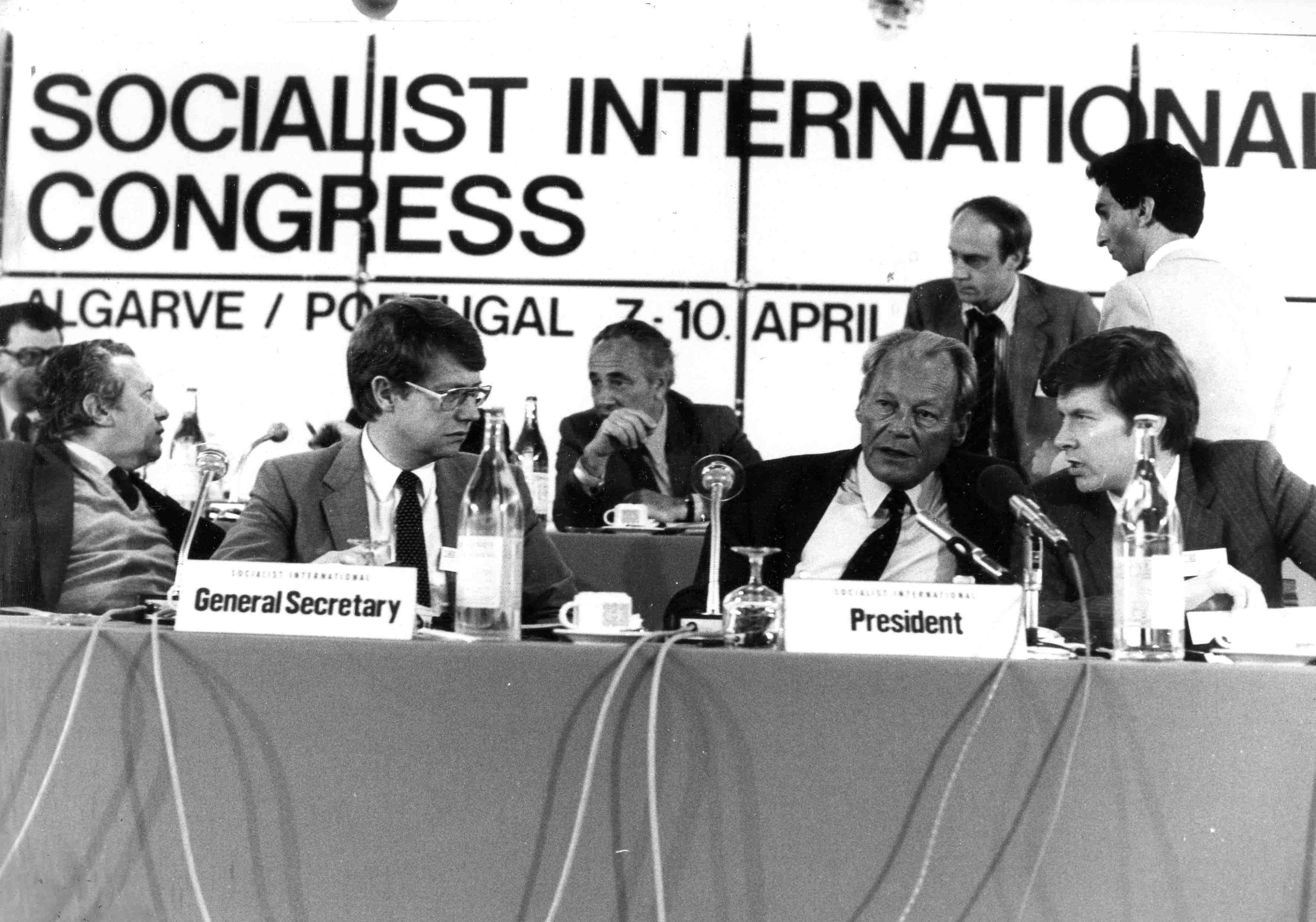
Socialist International Congress 1983. Willy Brandt with outgoing general secretary Bernt Carlsson (left) and new general secretary Pentti Väänänen (right)

In 1976, Carlsson became Secretary-General of Socialist International (SI), based in London, at the same time as former West German Chancellor, Willy Brandt, assumed the SI presidency. For the next seven years, Carlsson was engaged in extending the SI's influence beyond Europe to Third World countries, channelling money and political support to the struggle for liberation in Southern Africa. When there was a break-in at his London apartment, Carlsson confided to his Canadian SI colleague Robin Sears:

"They messed things up and pawed through my papers. Then just to make sure I knew it wasn't a simple burglary they piled my money in the centre of the living-room rug." ... "But don't talk about it, and I'm not going to report it. That would just give the bastards their little victory."

Carlsson also pioneered moves towards Middle East peace using the SI's unique position of having Israel's governing Labor Party as a member, and at the same time retaining very good ties with Arab countries and Yasser Arafat's faction in the PLO. Carlsson developed a particularly close relationship with Arafat's right-hand man, Issam Sartawi, who was murdered (allegedly by the Abu Nidal Organization) during an SI conference in Portugal on 10 April 1983. Earlier in 1983, however, in a dispute about what he perceived as the SI president's authoritarian approach, Carlsson rebuked Brandt saying: "this is a Socialist International – not a German International". Following the April 1983 SI congress in Albufeira, Portugal, which Brandt had contentiously decided to relocate the SI's conference from Sydney (due to the protests of newly elected pro-Israeli Australian Prime Minister Bob Hawke against the PLO's inclusion), Brandt retaliated by forcing Carlsson to step down.

== Swedish diplomat ==
Carlsson left London and returned to Sweden in 1983 and, for two years, became Palme's special emissary to the Middle East and Africa. Palme entrusted him with an important Middle East role in delicate attempts to negotiate a peace agreement between Iran and Iraq. From 1985 to 1987 Carlsson was head of Nordic Affairs in Sweden's foreign ministry. In 1986 Palme was assassinated.

== UN Commissioner for Namibia ==
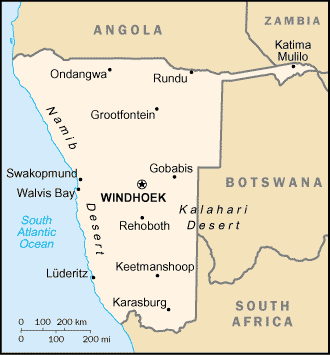
Map of South-West Africa (Namibia)

On 1 July 1987 Carlsson was appointed an Assistant-Secretary-General of the United Nations and the UN Commissioner for Namibia. On 28 September 1987 Carlsson was interviewed in the World In Action TV documentary The Case of the Disappearing Diamonds when he warned that the UN would take action against those who were illegally exploiting Namibia's natural resources. A year later, he convened a meeting in Stockholm between the SWAPO leadership (Sam Nujoma, Hage Geingob and Hidipo Hamutenya), and a delegation of whites from Namibia to discuss developments in the independence process.

Namibia's independence had been expected to take place soon after United Nations Security Council Resolution 435 was agreed in September 1978.

Ten years were to elapse until the Ronald Reagan/Mikhail Gorbachev summit of the leaders of the United States and the Soviet Union in Moscow (29 May 1988 – 1 June 1988), finally secured the implementation of UNSCR 435, which would require South Africa to relinquish its control of Namibia.

The delay was blamed by author and journalist Christopher Hitchens on Chester Crocker's 'procrastination' and on President Ronald Reagan's 'attempt to change the subject to the presence of Cuban forces in Angola' as well as the 'flagrant bias' in America's Namibia policy in favour of apartheid South Africa. Hitchens praised Carlsson's role as a 'neutral mediator' in the process leading to Namibia's independence:

An important participant was Bernt Carlsson, UN Commissioner for Namibia, who worked tirelessly for free elections in the colony and tried to isolate the racists diplomatically. Carlsson had been Secretary-General of the Socialist International, and International Secretary of the Swedish Social Democratic Party. He performed innumerable services for movements and individuals from Eastern Europe to Latin America. His death in the mass murder of the passengers on Pan American Flight 103 just before Christmas 1988, and just before the signing of the Namibia accords in New York, is appalling beyond words.

== Death ==
As a comment on Bernt Carlsson's death, in the Lockerbie bombing, an editorial in The Guardian of 23 December 1988 stated:

Two days before Christmas, two tides flow strongly. One – the greater tide – is the tide of peace. More nagging, bloody conflicts have been settled in 1988 than in any year since the end of the Second World War. There are forces for good abroad in the world as seldom before. There is also a tide of evil, a force of destruction. By just one of those ironies which afflict the human condition, peace came to Namibia yesterday. Meanwhile, on a Scottish hillside, the body of the Swedish UN Commissioner for Namibia was one amongst hundreds strewn across square miles of debris: a victim – supposition, but strongly based – of a random terrorist bomb which had blown a 747 to bits at 31,000 feet."

=== Call for urgent inquiry ===
In September 2009, former Labour Member of the European Parliament, Michael McGowan called for an urgent independent inquiry led by the United Nations into the Lockerbie bombing. McGowan wrote that he was personally affected by the crash: "As President of the Development Committee of the European Parliament, I had invited Bernt Carlsson, the Assistant Secretary-General of the United Nations and UN Commissioner for Namibia, to call in at Brussels in December 1988. He was on his way back to the United States from Namibia and agreed to address members of the Development Committee, which he did. In Brussels, he spoke about his hopes for an independent Namibia and the end of apartheid in South Africa to a packed meeting of MEPs."

=== UN murder inquiry ===
In investigating Carlsson's murder, Scottish police detective John Crawford stated in his book (The Lockerbie Incident: A Detective's Tale): 'We even went as far as consulting a very helpful lady librarian in Newcastle who contacted us with information she had on Bernt Carlsson. She provided much of the background on the political moves made by Carlsson on behalf of the United Nations. He had survived a previous attack on an aircraft he had been travelling on in Africa. It is unlikely that he was a target as the political scene in Southern Africa was moving inexorably towards its present state....I discounted the theory as being almost totally beyond the realms of feasibility.'

"A United Nations Inquiry can be expected to find a different – and much better – explanation for Bernt Carlsson's murder."

== Memorial ==
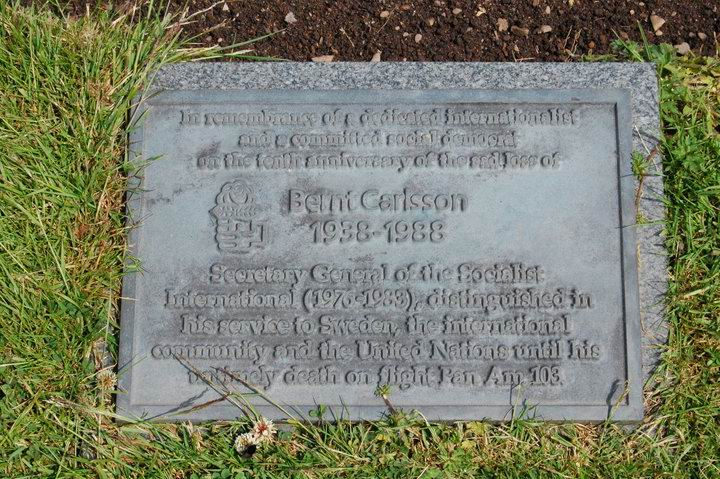
Bernt Carlsson memorial stone in Dryfesdale cemetery

On 26 December 1988, an obituary to Carlsson, written by his friend Michael Harrington, was published in the Los Angeles Times. The Bernt Carlsson Trust – otherwise known as One World Action – was founded by Glenys Kinnock on 21 December 1989 (the first anniversary of the Lockerbie air disaster) in memory of Carlsson.

On 21 December 1998, the Bernt Carlsson memorial stone was laid in the garden of remembrance at the Lockerbie air disaster memorial in the town's Dryfesdale cemetery. The inscription reads:

"In remembrance of a dedicated internationalist and a committed social democrat on the tenth anniversary of the sad loss of Bernt Carlsson (1938–1988), Secretary-General of the Socialist International (1976–1983), distinguished in his service to Sweden, the international community and the United Nations until his untimely death on flight Pan Am 103."

In 2008, to mark the 20th anniversary of the sabotage of Pan Am Flight 103, the Socialist International published an article entitled "Remembering Bernt Carlsson". The article quoted from the eulogy given by Sten Andersson (then Sweden's foreign minister) at the January 1989 memorial service in Stockholm. Andersson described Carlsson as:

"A man with a natural talent for the difficult art of silent diplomacy. In that art many are unsuccessful. But not Bernt. For Bernt was also a man with a soul as tough as steel as his friend Michael Harrington so nicely put it. We, his friends and colleagues, know that he was knowledgeable, with analytical acumen, single-minded and, most important of all, untiring in his fight for those most exposed, those most persecuted. At all times and in every post Bernt was always prepared in concrete action to make common cause with the weak and oppressed. In our country and the world."

In Windhoek, Namibia, a street in the Pionierpark Extension 1 township is named "Bernt Carlsson Road".

== Literature ==
John Douglas-Gray in his thriller The Novak Legacy ISBN 978-0-7552-1321-4

== See also ==
- Dag Hammarskjöld
- Hans Köchler's Lockerbie trial observer mission
- Olof Palme
- The Case of the Disappearing Diamonds
