= The Case of the Disappearing Diamonds =

Documentary film

The Case of the Disappearing Diamonds is a World in Action documentary film which reported on how billions of pounds' worth of gem diamonds were stripped from South West Africa (Namibia) over a 20-year period by the world's largest diamond mining company. It was broadcast by Thames Television on 28 September 1987. After the First World War, Ernest Oppenheimer held the monopoly over the mining and sale of South West African diamonds, and formed Consolidated Diamond Mines (CDM) which was owned by De Beers.

== Narrative ==
The voice-over narration begins:

Tonight we report on the dark side of the diamond industry. We show how one of the world's richest companies has been stripping one of the world's poorest nations of its main asset – diamonds from this mine. Namibia – a forgotten country long denied its independence. Here for 20 years, South Africa has ignored international law, occupied the land by force and refused to allow the formation of a democratic government. Behind the cover of a military occupation, Namibia has been robbed of its mineral wealth. Here a mining company has leased the world's largest diamond workings, taken £5 billion worth of gems and paid a rent of £130 per year. At the mouth of the Orange River, an accident of geology and the sands of time has laid down one of nature's rarest gifts to mankind – lonely beaches encrusted with the finest gem diamonds in the world. Released by volcanic activity inland, the diamonds were originally thrown into the Orange River, then over the centuries they were washed downstream and taken to the sea. Incoming tides put the finishing touches bringing the diamonds ashore.

== Interviewees ==
In sequence, the following were interviewed in The Case of the Disappearing Diamonds:

=== Martyn Marriott ===
Described as a Diamond Consultant, Mr Martyn Marriott, stated:

"It's well known they're the finest diamonds in the world – the highest quality, best colour, lovely diamonds. They are water-worn, thrown up into the beach and a very nice shape. They just happen to be good quality and good colour as well. The diamonds from Namibia are worth an average $200 per carat whereas the diamonds from Zaïre would be worth $8 per carat."

=== Eric Lang ===
Businessman Eric Lang said:

"Successive Administrator-Generals allowed the mining companies to get away with exporting 20–25% of production without any control whatsoever."

Lang threatened to release Namibia's mineral statistics, to which countries they were being sold and at what prices. Lang said he believes that the plunder of his country's resources could lead to another famine in Africa, and that the people of Namibia had lost their equivalent of North Sea Oil – what would have given them a secure future.

"Namibia's economy is extremely sick – the government consumes 75% of GDP to run the country which, today, is the second most indebted country on the African continent – from a debt-free nation seven years ago. The situation in Namibia could become far more serious than Angola and Mozambique. Without international aid, Namibia could turn into the Ethiopia of Southern Africa."

=== Gordon Brown ===
Former CDM manager, Gordon Brown, claimed that for 20 years De Beers had been stripping Namibia of its most precious asset – diamonds at Oranjemund.

"Overmining took place on the upper terraces and the 'N' blocks [in the upper terraces, blocks K, L, and M were rich in diamonds and the richest of all were the 'N' blocks] which were the series of beaches situated furthest from the sea. That's where the richest blocks were in terms of grade and stone size. There was a central block between the two major beaches that was of lower grade. That was left behind – the company concentrated on taking out the ore reserves furthest from the sea. That's not good mining practice. Proper mining practice calls for the average ore reserve grade and average stone size. I would liken this to a nice big cream cake, with a sponge cake below. Normally you would take out a slice at a time, but in the case of overmining the cream is completely scraped off the top."

=== John Shaedonhodi ===
A Namibian and a CDM worker, John Shaedonhodi, said he was concerned that a future independent Namibia would be impoverished.

=== Bernt Carlsson ===
The man responsible for Namibia under international law, Assistant Secretary-General of the United Nations and UN Commissioner for Namibia, Bernt Carlsson, was asked about Namibia's diamonds:

"The corporation has been trying to skim the cream which means they have gone for the large diamonds at the expense of the steady pace. In this way they have really shortened the lifespan of the mines. One would expect from a worldwide corporation like De Beers and Anglo American that they would behave with an element of social and political responsibility. But their behaviour in the specific case of Namibia has been one of profit maximisation regardless of its social, economic, political and even legal responsibility."

The United Nations Council for Namibia enacted in 1974 a Decree for the Protection of the Natural Resources of Namibia, under which no person or entity could search for, take or distribute any natural resources found in Namibia without the council's permission. Any person or entity contravening the Decree could be held liable for damages by the future government of an independent Namibia. Companies like De Beers have ignored the law but now attitudes at the UN are beginning to harden:

"The United Nations this year [1987] in July started legal action against one such company – the Dutch company URENCO which imports uranium."

Will you be taking action against other companies such as De Beers?

"All the companies which are carrying out activities in Namibia which have not been authorised by the United Nations are being studied at present."

== Thirion Report ==
The documentary referred to a wide-ranging investigation carried out by South African Judge Pieter Willem Thirion in 1982 into political corruption and the divisive tribal structures imposed on Namibia by the apartheid government. Judge Thirion extended his investigation into the behaviour of multinational mining companies in the former German colony and found: at one mine 420,000 tonnes of ore were sent out of the country as "geological samples"; at another, the state leased the mining rights to a businessman at £1,500 per year, who then reassigned them for an income of £650,000 per year; at the British owned Tsumeb mine, lead and copper were exported with undisclosed amounts of gold and silver; and the British South West Africa Company exported £7 million worth of minerals without paying tax.

Judge Thirion focused upon the stewardship of the nation's principal economic resource – gem diamonds of the Atlantic beaches north of the Orange River. The Thirion Report's main findings were:

1. There were no meaningful controls over Namibia's most important industry;
2. The premises of the supposedly independent Diamond Board for South West Africa were provided by De Beers;
3. All of the Board's agents were De Beers' employees;
4. The entire costs of running the Board were met by De Beers as a tax deductible expense;
5. Stanley Jackson, the Diamond Board Secretary, was also Secretary to Consolidated Diamond Mines.

The 350-page report found that De Beers had overmined the diamond reserves ahead of Namibia's independence:

The excessive depletion of the deposit was a preferential depletion of the more valuable deposits to the detriment of the low grade deposits, and therefore a breach of the provisions of Clause 3 of the Halbscheid Agreement. The probabilities are that the effect of the excessive depletion of the deposit will be to shorten the life of the mine and to detrimentally affect its profitability towards the end of its life.

== Credits ==
- Camera: Howard Somers
- Sound: David Woods
- Film Editors: Oral Ottey, John Rutherford
- Dubbing Mixer: John Whitworth
- Production Assistants: Adele McLoughlin, Judith Fraser
- Investigation by: Laurie Flynn and John Coates
- Editor: Stuart Prebble
- Executive Producer: Ray Fitzwalter
- Granada Television MCMLXXXVII.
