= Jean Tholbert Alèxis =

Haitian politician

Jean Tholbert Alèxis is a Haitian politician who served as President of the Chamber of Deputies.

Alèxis was born in 1973. He is a lawyer and former professor.

Alèxis was elected to the Chamber of Deputies in 2010 under the coalition Together We Are Strong. He was elected as the President of the Chamber of Deputies from January 2013 to January 2014.
