= Benedicta Lasi =

Ghanaian lawyer

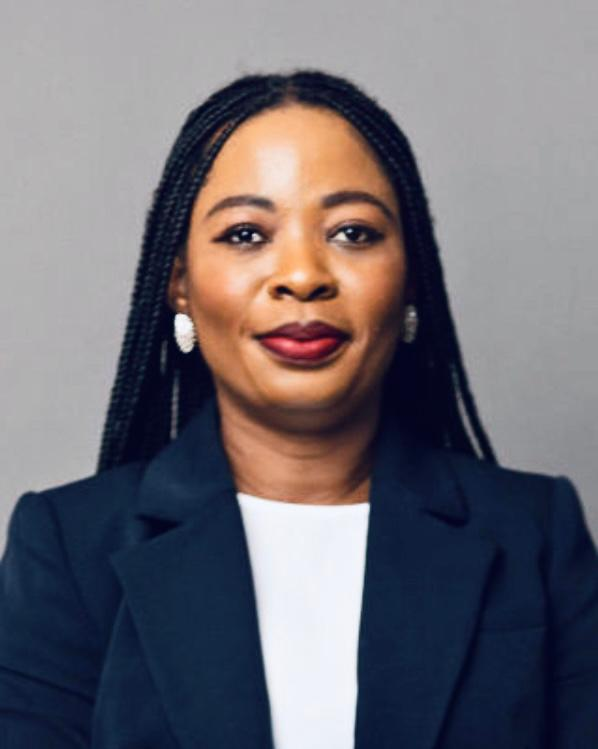
- Lasi in 2023
- Born: August 15, 1987 (age 38)
- Citizenship: Ghanaian
- Education: University of Ghana
- Alma mater: University of Ghana, Kofi Annan International Peacekeeping Training Centre
- Occupations: Lawyer, Development Economist, Governance Strategist
- Organization(s): Socialist International, Africa Governance Centre, African Trade Chamber, Fitch Attorneys
- Known for: Economic policy, Industrial policy, Global affairs, International development, Governance reforms

Benedicta Lasi (born 15 August 1987) is a Ghanaian lawyer, development economist, and politician. She is the founder of the Africa Governance Centre and the African Trade Chamber, and was elected to the Presidium of the Socialist International as Secretary-General together with other world leaders including Prime Minister of Spain, Pedro Sánchez and Prime Minister of Albania, Edi Rama, becoming the first woman, first African, and youngest person to ever hold the position

== Early life and education ==
Lasi was born on 15 August 1987 in Ghana. She attended the University of Ghana, earning a Bachelor of Arts in Political Science and Sociology and a Bachelor of Laws (LL.B.) degree. She completed professional legal training at the Ghana School of Law and was called to the Ghana Bar.

She holds two master’s degrees: a Master of Economic Policy Management from the University of Ghana’s Department of Economics and a Master of Conflict, Peace and Security from the Kofi Annan International Peacekeeping Training Centre. Her graduate researches examined Africa–European Union trade and development co-operation and inter-agency coordination within Ghana’s national security framework.

== Legal and Professional Career ==
Lasi is a Senior Partner at Fitch Attorneys, where she specialises in transactional law and advisory working on project finance, corporate structuring and finance, contracts, and investment advisory and structuring. She advises governments and private-sector corporations in the energy, mining, infrastructure development, and special economic zones (SEZs) sectors.

Her practice integrates legal, financial, and economic policy advisory to design bankable frameworks for industrial projects, public-private partnerships, and cross-border investments. As a development economist, she advises governments on fiscal and monetary policies and advocates for intra-African trade, regional value chains, and sound regulatory frameworks as drivers of sustainable growth.

== International Development Work ==
=== Africa Governance Centre ===
Benedicta Lasi founded the Africa Governance Centre - an independent, non-partisan think tank promoting governance excellence and institutional capacity across Africa. As Executive Chair, she leads programmes to strengthen democratic governance and cross-party co-operation, including the African Political Parties Initiative (APPI) and the African Political Parties Summit (APPS). Her public addresses emphasise that African nations’ progress is interdependent and that governance reform must underpin economic transformation.

=== Africa Trade Chamber ===
Benedicta Lasi also founded the African Trade Chamber to advance private-sector-led trade and industrial integration on the continent. As Executive Chair, she directs programmes that develop sector-based industry councils and entrepreneur networks linking African businesses to regional markets. The ATC collaborates with development banks and investors to strengthen Africa’s industrial base and policy frameworks for trade growth.

=== Socialist International and Global Leadership ===
At the XXVI Congress of the Socialist International (Madrid, 25–27 November 2022), Lasi was elected Secretary-General, becoming the first African, first woman, and youngest person to hold the office. From 2016 to 2021 she served as Vice-President of the International Union of Socialist Youth (IUSY), co-ordinating its Africa Committee and promoting youth political participation globally.

In 2023 she was appointed Co-Chair of the Feminist Foreign Policy Progressive Voices Collective, a Brussels-based initiative of the Foundation for European Progressive Studies (FEPS), alongside former Swedish Foreign Minister Ann Linde.

== Advocacy and Impact ==
Beyond her institutional roles, Lasi supports initiatives on women’s leadership and youth empowerment and frequently speaks at international forums on governance and development. She argues that political stability must translate into broad-based prosperity and human development.
