= Robert Manuel (veteran) =

Korean War veteran (1935–2017)

Robert Edward Manuel Sr. (February 21, 1935 – April 14, 2017) was a Korean War veteran best known for getting Vimy Ridge Day recognized as a National Heritage Day in Canada.

== Early life ==
Manuel was born in the small town of Stourbridge, England. He – along with his parents, Lillian Rae Manuel (née Liscumb) and Percy Manuel, and older brothers Donald and Reginald – immigrated to Canada, where he was raised and educated in Kirkland Lake, Ontario, Canada. Manuel was involved in the Royal Canadian Army Cadets starting at age 13. He joined the Regular Army and saw combat in the Korean War in 1951 to 1952.

=== Postwar life ===
Manuel returned to Canada after his service in Korea and resided in Elliot Lake, Ontario. He lived there with his wife Colleen Manuel (née Foster) from 1956 and until his death in 2017. He and Colleen wed on July 28, 1956, and the two had four children together: Robert, Christine, Stephen, and Terry. Manuel was an underground electrician for many years and retired to work on personal projects and give back to his community.

== Contributions and community service ==
Manuel was an active community member and fervent patriot throughout his life. He was the founding member of the Elliot Lake Legion Branch 561 marching band , where he was a Drum Major. He was the director of the Elliot Lake Chamber of Commerce and Regional Director of the Terry Fox Foundation for 10 years. Manuel helped establish many associations such as the Korean Veterans Association, the Navy League of Elliot Lake, and the Legion marching band. In the community of Elliot Lake, Manuel introduced the Elliot Lake Winter Fest and the annual Legion New Years Levée, and, with the support of his wife Colleen to a great extent, a number of other events in Elliot Lake.

Manuel was the chairman at the Woodland Cemetery Memorial Pilgrimage Annual July 1 Observance. He was also an executive member in the Royal Canadian Legion Branch 561, having attained the highest award the Legion issues. He raised funds for the Kidney Foundation in Elliot Lake and has started a fundraiser of his own, Koins for Kids, under the Christian Children's Fund of Canada.

== Achievements ==
Manuel accomplished a number of personal feats in addition to his community work. Most notably, he garnered support from Canadians of all statures in having the Battle of Vimy Ridge recognized as a national heritage day in Canada. From 2004 forward, April 9 has served as a reminder of the great sacrifices and contribution Canada and its military made to the world.

Manuel also initiated the recognition of the Canadian Peace Keepers' Day in Ontario, which is also a federally recognized day that falls on August 9.

== Awards and honours ==
- Jaycee of the Year – 1964
- Past Presidents Metal – Royal Canadian Legion (seven terms)
- Life Member – Royal Canadian Legion
- Certificate of Merit – Canada Council
- Certificate of Merit – Terry Fox Youth Centre
- 15 Year Volunteer Service Award – Ministry of Citizenship – Ontario
- Korean Veterans Association – Merit Medal
- Legion Dominion Command – highest award – The Palm Leaf
- Friendship Awards – First Elliot Lake Scouts
- Governor General Award for Volunteers – 1992
- Canadian Peace Keeping Medal
- Elliot Lake Civic Award – 2001
- Coronation Medal – 1952
- Queen Elizabeth Golden Jubilee Medal
- Ambassadors Peace Medal – Korean Government
- Ontario Bi-Centennial Medal – Province of Ontario
- Canada 125 Medal
