= Stevenson Jacques Thimoléon =

Haitian politician

Stevenson Jacques Thimoléon (born 10 May 1970) is a Haitian politician who served as president of the Chamber of Deputies from 15 January 2014 to 11 January 2016.

Thimoléon was born on 10 May 1970 in Petit-Goâve. He is a lawyer by profession. Thimoléon was elected to the Chamber of Deputies in the 2011 general elections from Petit-Goâve constituency. He was a member of the Parliamentarians for Stability and Progress (PSP) bloc.
