= Fritz Robert Saint-Paul =

Haitian politician

Fritz Robert Saint-Paul is a Haitian judge and politician who served as President of the Chamber of Deputies.

Saint-Paul was born on 1 June 1962 in Chantal, southern Haiti. He has a bachelor's degree in law from the State University of Haiti. He also has a master's degree in international law from the University of Montreal. He worked as a civil servant in the Ministry of National Education.

Saint-Paul was elected to the Chamber of Deputies of Haiti twice from 1991 to 1995 and from 1995 to 1999 as a Pro-Aristide Lavalas member. He served as the President of the Chamber of Deputies from October 1995 to January 1997. He worked as a consultant to the Chamber of Deputies from 2007 to 2008.

Saint-Paul was appointed as a judge to the Superior Court of Accounts and Administrative Litigation (CSCCA). He served as its chairman of the board from April 2014 to September 2015., and as the president from October 2021 to September 2022. He works as a professor at the State University of Haiti and teaches public international law and constitutional law.
