= Chamber of Deputies (Haiti) =

Lower house of the legislature of Haiti

Chamber of Deputies Chambre des députés Chanm Depite
- Currently Dissolved
- National emblem of Haiti

Type
- Type: Lower house of the Haitian Parliament
- Term limits: No limits

Structure
- Seats: 119
- Political groups: Vacant (119)
- Length of term: Four years

Elections
- Voting system: Two-round system
- Last election: 2015–16
- Next election: TBD

Meeting place
- Port-au-Prince

Website
- http://www.chambredesdeputes.ht/

The Chamber of Deputies (French: Chambre des députés; Haitian Creole: Chanm Depite) is the lower house of Haiti's bicameral legislature, the Haitian Parliament. The upper house of the Haitian Parliament is the Senate of Haiti. The Chamber has 119 members (previously 99) who are elected by popular vote to four-year terms. There are no term limits for Deputies; they may be re-elected indefinitely.

In March 2015 a new electoral decree stated that the new Chamber of Deputies have 118 members, and the Senate will retain the 30 members. On 13 March, President Michel Martelly issued a decree that split the Cerca La Source into two constituencies, and therefore increasing the number of deputies up to 119.

== Elections history ==
The first bicameral legislature, created under Alexandre Pétion's 1816 revision to the 1806 constitution, formed the Senate as the upper house and the Chamber of Representatives of the Communes as the lower house. The Chamber, which was first elected on 10 February 1817 and held its first session on 22 April 1817, elected Pierre André as its first president of the chamber. Pétion gave his final public speech in front of the newly-seated chamber, but then suspended the legislature the following year.

Candidates from Jean-Bertrand Aristide's Fanmi Lavalas party took 73 of the then 83 seats in the 2000 elections. Following the overthrow of the government in February 2004, an interim government was established. The terms of the Deputies expired during the rule of the interim government and the Chamber remained empty. It was re-established along with the Senate, and elections were scheduled for November 2005. After many delays and missed deadlines, elections were finally held on 21 April 2006. The Deputies commenced meeting in June 2006. The exact makeup of the Chamber remains unknown as the Provisional Electoral Committee (CEP) has not posted the results. The next Chamber elections were scheduled for 2010. There were new parliamentary elections in 2015–16.

== Previous composition ==
Party	Deputies		
Party	1st Round	2nd Round	Total
Haitian Tèt Kale Party (PHTK)	4	22	26
Plateforme Vérité (VERITE)	1	12	13
Konvansyon Inite Demokratik (KID)	0	7	7
Struggling People's Organization (OPL)	0	7	7
Fanmi Lavalas (FL)	0	6	6
Haiti in Action (AAA)	2	4	6
Patriotic Unity (INITE PATRIYOTIK)	1	3	4
Alternative League for Haitian Progress and Emancipation (LAPEH)	0	3	3
Fusion of Haitian Social Democrats (FSDH)	0	3	3
Reseau National Bouclier (BOUCLIER)	0	3	3
Renmen Ayiti	0	2	2
Tet Kole sous Chimen Devlopman pou un Nord'Ouest uni et Renonve (MOSANO)	0	2	2
Consortium National des Partis Politiques Haïtiens (CONSORTIUM)	0	2	2
Pont	0	1	1
Platfom Pitit Desalin	0	1	1
Parti pour la Libération des Masses et d'Intégration Sociale (PALMIS)	0	1	1
Konbit Travaye Peyizan pou Libere Ayiti (KONTRA PEP LA)	0	1	1
Mouvement National Haïtien (MONHA)	0	1	1
Konsyans Patriotik (KP)	0	1	1
Federalist Party (PF)	0	1	1
Mouvement Action Socialiste (MAS)	0	1	1
Seats that haven't been awarded yet (currently vacant)			27
Total	8	84	119
Sources: , ,

== Presidents of the Chamber of Deputies ==
Le Président de la Chambre / Prezidan Chanm Depite

Name	Took office	Left office	Party
Pierre André	? - 1817	1817–?	
N.-D. Lafargue	? - 1819	July 1820–?	
Pierre André	? - 1820	1820–?	
Doizé Pouponneau	? - November 1821	November 1821–?	
Caminero	? - October 1822	1825–?	
Beaubrun Ardouin	? - January 1826	January 1826–?	
Franco Travieso	? - 1826	1826–?	
P. Muzaine	? - 1826	1826–?	
M. Duval	? - 1827	1827	
Jean Benis	1827	1827	
Jacques Depa	1827	1827–?	
M. Druilhet	? - 1828	1828	
Doizé Pouponneau	1828	1828	
D. Villedautant	1828	1829–?	
E. Legros	? - 1830	1830	
Doizé Pouponneau	1830	1830–?	
A. Massez	? - 1831	1831–?	
J. S. Milscent	? - 1832	1832	
G. Malval	1832	1832–?	
J. S. Milscent	? - September 1833	June 1835–?	
Phanor Dupin	? - October 1839	November 1839–?	
H.-In. Joseph	? - 1848	1848–?	
Brutus de Jean-Simon	? - September 1849	September 1849–?	
Brutus de Jean-Simon	? - 1852	1852–?	
Jean-François Acloque	?	?	
Panayoty	? - 1859	1859–?	
V. Lizaire	? - 1860	1860–?	
W. Chanlatte	? - September 1860	December 1860–?	
R. A. Deslandes	? - July 1862	August 1862–?	
P.-N. Valcin	? - 1864	1864–?	
T. Chalviré	? - 1870	1870–?	
Jeantel Manigat	? - 1870	1870–?	
J. Thébaud	? - 1874	1874–?	
Hannibal Price	1876	1876	
Eugène Margron	? - August 1877	August 1877–?	
Hannibal Price	? - 1878	1878–?	
Demesvar Delorme	? - 1879	1879–?	
Guillaume Manigat	? - October 1880	October 1880–?	
François Manigat	April 1881	October 1881–?	
Edmond Paul	?	?	
Ripert Honorat	? - February 1883	February 1883–?	
Osman Piquant	? - August 1884	September 1884–?	
Fabius Ducasse	? - October 1885	October 1885–?	
Germain	? - 1886	1886 – ?	
Dorvil Théodore	? - June 1887	June 1887–?	
Oswald Durand	1888	1888	
M. Stewart; President of the constitutional assembly	?	1889	
Pétion Pierre-André	? - September 1891	September 1892–?	
M. Stewart	? - September 1893	December 1893–?	
J. M. Grandoit	? - July 1894	December 1894–?	
Vilbrun Guillaume Sam	? - July 1895 – 1896	October 1897–?	
Camille Saint-Rémy	1898	1898	
Henri Prophète	1899	1900	
Philippe Sudré Dartiguenave	? - September 1901	September 1901–?	
Stephen Archer	? - 1903	1906–?	
G. Desrosiers	1908	1911	
A. Amisia	? - 1912	1912–?	
St-Amand Blot	? - 1913	1913–?	
Denis Saint-Aude	? - 1914	1914–?	
Annulysse André	1915	?	
J. M. Grandoit	? - 1922	1925	
Em. J. Thomas	1925	1925	
Edmond Montas	1925	1926	
Em. J. Thomas	1926	1927	
Charles Bouchereau	1927	1928	
Antoine C. Sansaricq	1928	1929	
F. Robinson	1929	1929–?	
Joseph Jolibois	1930	1932	
Joseph Loubeau	1932	?	
Denis Saint-Aude; President of the constitutional assembly	? - 1932	1933–?	
Edg. Pierre-Louis	?	1934	
Dumarsais Estimé	1934	1935	
Louis S. Zéphirin	1936	1939	
Edouard Piou	1939	1940–?	
Théophile Richard	1941	January 1944	
Hugues Bourjolly	January 1944	1944	
Théophile Richard	1944	1946	
Joseph Loubeau	1946	1949	
Dumas Michel	1949	1949–?	
Adelphin Telson	4 April 1950	1955–?	
Salnave C. Zamor	1956	1956–?	
Rameau Estimé	? - 1958	1960–?	
Luc F. François	? - 1961	1962–?	
Rameau Estimé	1962	1963	
Jean M. Julme	? - 1963	1964–?	
Ulrick Saint-Louis	1971	?	
Victor Nevers Constant	? - 1977	1981	
Jaurès Levêque	? - 1983	1985–?	
No legislature	1986	1987	
Émile Jonassaint; President of the constitutional assembly	? - March 1987	1988	
Jacques Saint-Louis	January 1988	June 1988	
No legislature	June 1988	February 1991	
Ernst Pedro Casséus	1991	20 August 1991	
Pierre Duly Brutus	20 August 1991	1992	
Alexandre Médard	15 January 1992	January 1993	
Antoine Joseph	January 1993	January 1994	
Frantz Robert Mondé	13 January 1994	1994	
Pierre Duly Brutus	1994	1995	
Fritz Robert Saint-Paul	October 1995	January 1997	
Kely Bastien	14 January 1997	January 1998	
Vasco Thernélan	January 1998	January 1999–?	
Sainvoyis Pascal	28 August 2000	2000	
Pierre Paul Cotin	? – December 2000	28 February 2002	
Rudy Hériveaux	28 February 2002	January 2003	
Yves Cristalin	? – April 2003	January 2004	
No legislature	January 2004	May 2006	
Pierre Eric Jean-Jacques	May 2006	January 2009	
Levaillant Louis Jeune	January 2009	26 April 2011	
Sorel Jacinthe	26 April 2011	January 2012	
Levaillant Louis Jeune	January 2012	January 2013	
Jean Tholbert Alèxis	January 2013	15 January 2014	
Stevenson Jacques Thimoléon	15 January 2014	11 January 2016	
Cholzer Chancy	11 January 2016	10 January 2018	
Gary Bodeau	10 January 2018	13 January 2020	
Vacant	13 January 2020	Present	

== See also ==
- List of current members of the National Assembly of Haiti
