= Levaillant Louis-Jeune =

Haitian politician

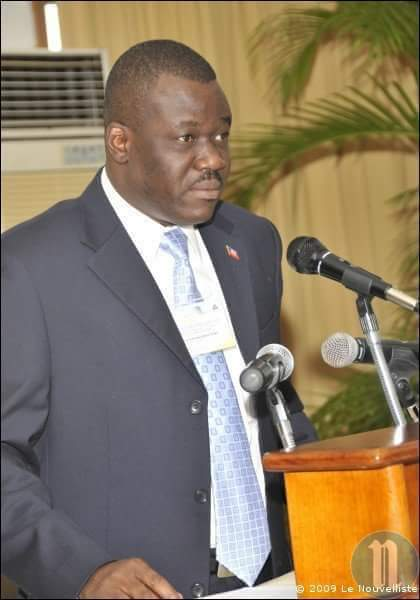
Levaillant Louis-Jeune

Levaillant Louis-Jeune is a Haitian politician who served as President of the Chamber of Deputies.

He was born in 1963. He is a lawyer and former professor. He has represented several political groups, such as PANPRA, CPP (Concertation of Progressive Parliamentarians) and INITE.

Louis-Jeune was elected as a deputy to the Chamber of Deputies in 2006 under the list of Fusion of Haitian Social Democrats. He was elected as President of the Chamber of Deputies from January 2009 to April 2011, and again from January 2012 to January 2013. He was publicly in opposition to President Martelly.
