= Jean-Alexis Rouchon =

- Born: November 12, 1801; Bort-les-Orgues
- Died: 1878

Jean-Alexis Rouchon, was a French printer born in Bort-les-Orgues in 1801, (Other sources cite 1794) who is known for pioneering large format color printing in the streets of Paris.

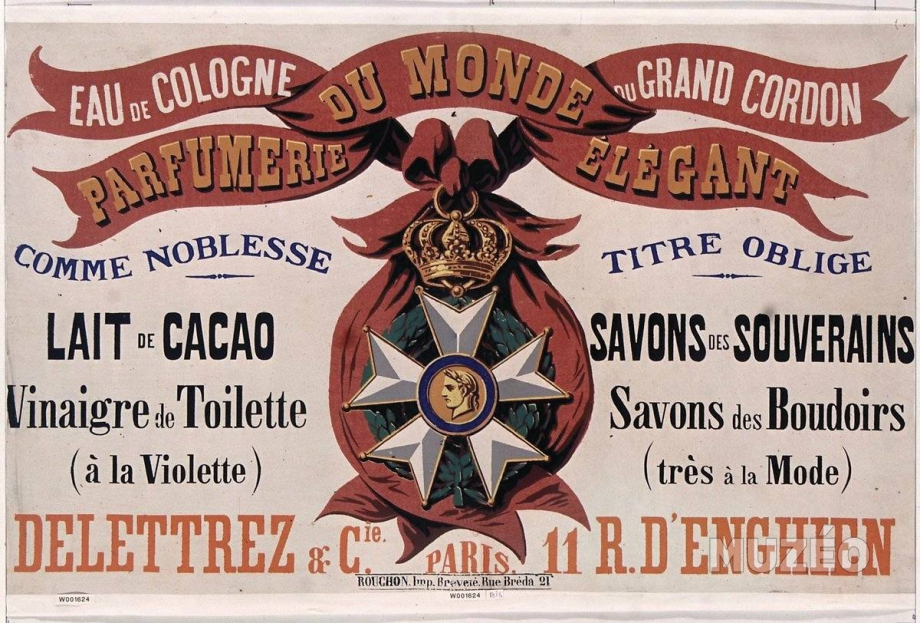
Eau de Cologne du Grand Cordon. Parfumerie du monde élégant, Paris, 1857 (BNF).

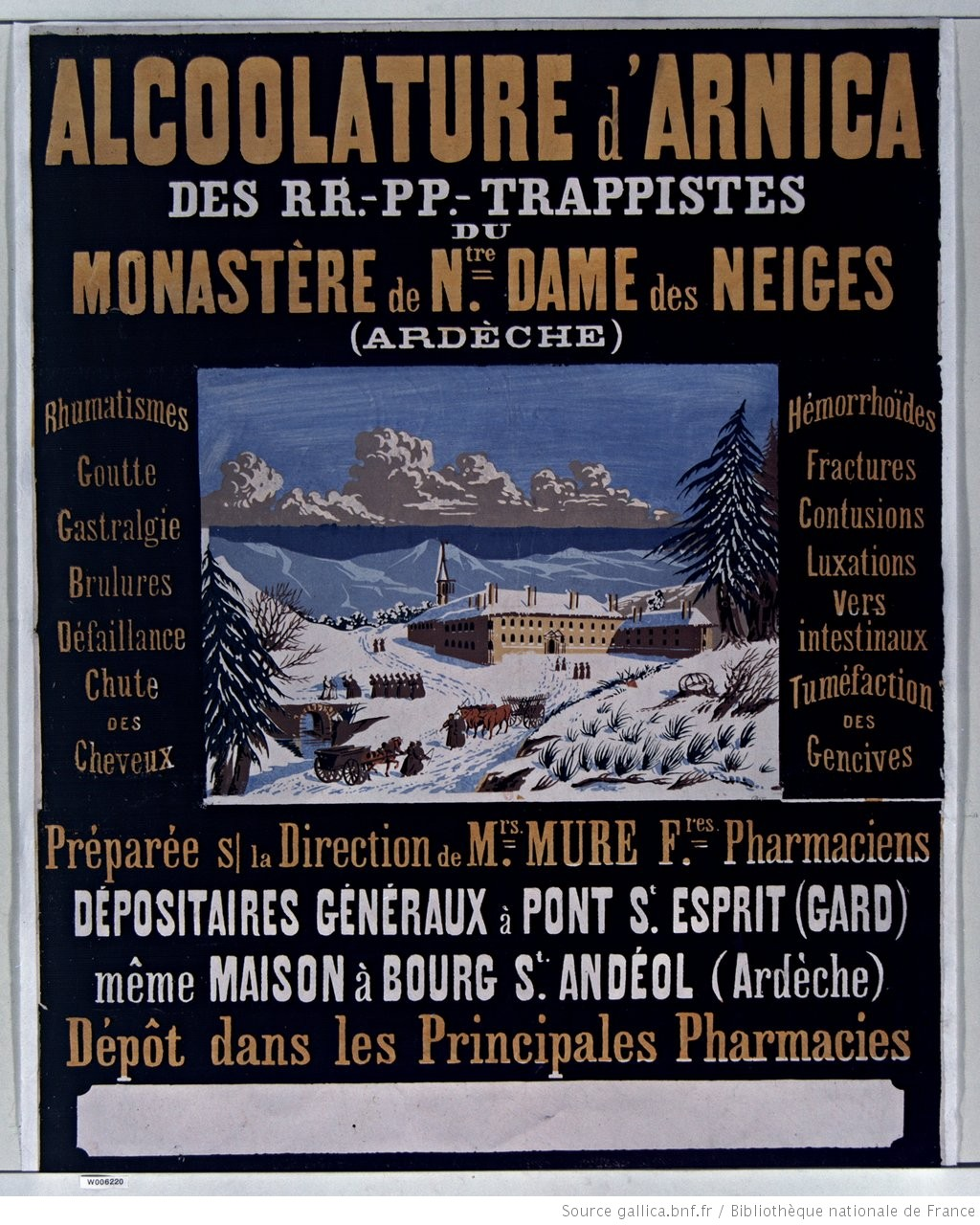
Alcoolature d'Arnica, Paris, 1862 (BNF).

Rouchon, who was initially a wallpaper printer, registered two patents, one in 1844 and one in 1851, concerning the application of wallpaper printing techniques to color printing of posters. He is frequently credited with enlarging the average size of the poster and pioneering color printing on posters. Researcher Karen L. Carter highlights him as being one of the first to employ large images for advertising instead of just text.

In 2024, students at the HAW Hamburg, under the guidance of Prof. Pierre Pané-Farré and Simon Thiefes analysed around 110 of Rouchon’s posters and published their findings in a newspaper-style publication called A Case Study, For example R.,.

== Posters ==
The Bibliothèque nationale de France has archived over 150 prints by Rouchon.
