= List of current members of the Parliament of Haiti =

This is a list of the 149 (or, in practice, zero) members of the 50th Parliament of Haiti. The Chamber of Deputies is currently defunct: As of 28 October 2021, the terms of the representatives elected in the 2015–16 election expired. Ten senators elected in 2016–17 retained their seats until 10 January 2023; after the expiration of those remaining senators' terms, Haiti has no elected members of either chamber of its Parliament.

== Senate ==
=== Artibonite ===
Delegation from Artibonite department
| Senator | Party | Expiration of term |
|---|---|---|
| Vacant | —N/a | —N/a |
| Vacant | —N/a | —N/a |
| Vacant | —N/a | —N/a |

=== Centre ===
Delegation from Centre department
| Senator | Party | Expiration of term |
|---|---|---|
| Vacant | —N/a | —N/a |
| Vacant | —N/a | —N/a |
| Vacant | —N/a | —N/a |

=== Grand'Anse ===
Delegation from Grand'Anse department
| Senator | Party | Expiration of term |
|---|---|---|
| Vacant | —N/a | —N/a |
| Vacant | —N/a | —N/a |
| Vacant | —N/a | —N/a |

=== Nippes ===
Delegation from Nippes department
| Senator | Party | Expiration of term |
|---|---|---|
| Vacant | —N/a | —N/a |
| Vacant | —N/a | —N/a |
| Vacant | —N/a | —N/a |

=== Nord ===
Delegation from Nord department
| Senator | Party | Expiration of term |
|---|---|---|
| Vacant | —N/a | —N/a |
| Vacant | —N/a | —N/a |
| Vacant | —N/a | —N/a |

=== Nord-Est ===
Delegation from Nord-Est department
| Senator | Party | Expiration of term |
|---|---|---|
| Vacant | —N/a | —N/a |
| Vacant | —N/a | —N/a |
| Vacant | —N/a | —N/a |

=== Nord-Ouest ===
Delegation from Nord-Ouest department
| Senator | Party | Expiration of term |
|---|---|---|
| Vacant | —N/a | —N/a |
| Vacant | —N/a | —N/a |
| Vacant | —N/a | —N/a |

=== Ouest ===
Delegation from Ouest department
| Senator | Party | Expiration of term |
|---|---|---|
| Vacant | —N/a | —N/a |
| Vacant | —N/a | —N/a |
| Vacant | —N/a | —N/a |

=== Sud ===
Delegation from Sud department
| Senator | Party | Expiration of term |
|---|---|---|
| Vacant | —N/a | —N/a |
| Vacant | —N/a | —N/a |
| Vacant | —N/a | —N/a |

=== Sud-Est ===
Delegation from Sud-Est department
| Senator | Party | Expiration of term |
|---|---|---|
| Vacant | Vacant | —N/a |
| Vacant | Vacant | —N/a |
| Vacant | —N/a | —N/a |

== Chamber of Deputies ==
=== Artibonite ===
Delegation from Artibonite department
| Deputy | Constituency | Party |
|---|---|---|
| Vacant | Dessalines: 1st circ. Dessalines | —N/a |
| Vacant | Dessalines: 2ème. circ. Pte. Rivière de l'Artibonite | —N/a |
| Vacant | Dessalines: 3ème. circ. Grande Saline | —N/a |
| Vacant | Dessalines: 4ème. circ. Desdunes | —N/a |
| Vacant | Gonaives: 1ère circ. Gonaives | —N/a |
| Vacant | Gonaives: 2ème circ. L'Estère | —N/a |
| Vacant | Gonaives: 3ème circ. Ennery | —N/a |
| Vacant | Gros Morne: 1ère circ. Gros Morne | —N/a |
| Vacant | Gros Morne: 2ème circ. Anse Rouge et Terre Neuve | —N/a |
| Vacant | Marmelade: unique circ. Marmelade et St Michel | —N/a |
| Vacant | Saint Marc: 1ère. circ. St. Marc | —N/a |
| Vacant | St. Marc: 2ème circ. Verrettes | —N/a |
| Vacant | St. Marc: 3ème circ La Chapelle | —N/a |

=== Centre ===
Delegation from Centre department
| Deputy | Constituency | Party |
|---|---|---|
| Vacant | Cerca la Source: unique circ. Cerca la Source et Thomassique | —N/a |
| Vacant | Hinche: 1ere. circ. Hinche | —N/a |
| Vacant | Hinche: 2ème circ. Thomonde | —N/a |
| Vacant | Hinche: 3ème. circ. Maïssade | —N/a |
| Vacant | Hinche: 4ème circ. Cerca Carvajal et le quartier de Los Palis | —N/a |
| Vacant | Lascahobas: 1ère circ. Lascahobas | —N/a |
| Vacant | Lascahobas: 2ème circ. Belladère | —N/a |
| Vacant | Lascahobas: 3ème circ. Savanette et le quartier de Baptiste | —N/a |
| Vacant | Mirebalais: 1ère circ. Mirebalais et Boucan Carré | —N/a |
| Vacant | Mirebalais: 2ème circ. Saut d'Eau | —N/a |

=== Grand'Anse ===
Delegation from Grand'Anse department
| Deputy | Constituency | Party |
|---|---|---|
| Vacant | Anse d'Hainault: 1ère circ. Anse d'Hainault et les Irois | —N/a |
| Vacant | Anse d'Hainault: 2ème circ. Dame Marie | —N/a |
| Vacant | Corail: 1ème circ. Corail et Roseaux | —N/a |
| Vacant | Corail: 2ème circ. Pestel et Beaumont | —N/a |
| Vacant | Jérémie: 1ère circ. Jérémie | —N/a |
| Vacant | Jérémie: 2ème circ. Abricot et Bonbon | —N/a |
| Vacant | Jérémie: 3ème circ. Moron et Chamberllan | —N/a |

=== Nippes ===
Delegation from Nippes department
| Deputy | Constituency | Party |
|---|---|---|
| Vacant | Anse à Veau: 1ère circ. Anse à Veau et d'Arnaud | —N/a |
| Vacant | Anse à Veau | —N/a |
| Vacant | Anse à Veau: 3ème circ. Petit-Trou de Nippes et Plaisance du Sud | —N/a |
| Vacant | Baradères: unique circ. Baradères et Grand Boucan | —N/a |
| Vacant | Miragoâne: 1ère circ. Miragoâne et Fonds des Nègres | —N/a |
| Vacant | Miragoâne: 2ème circ. Petite-Rivière-de Nippes et Paillant | —N/a |

=== Nord ===
Delegation from Nord department
| Deputy | Constituency | Party |
|---|---|---|
| Vacant | Acul du Nord: 1ère circ. Acul du Nord | —N/a |
| Vacant | Acul du Nord: 2ème circ. Plaine du Nord et Milot | —N/a |
| Vacant | Borgne: unique circ. Borgne et Port-Margot | —N/a |
| Vacant | Cap Haitien: 1ère circ. Cap-Haitien | —N/a |
| Vacant | Cap Haitien: 2ème circ. Limonade et Quartier Morin | —N/a |
| Vacant | Grande Rivière du Nord: unique circ. Grande-Rivière du Nord et Bahon | —N/a |
| Vacant | Limbé: unique circ. Limbé et Bas-Limbé | —N/a |
| Vacant | Plaisance: 1ère circ. Plaisance | —N/a |
| Vacant | Plaisance: 2ème circ. Pilate | —N/a |
| Vacant | Saint Raphael: 1ère circ. Saint Raphael et Dondon | —N/a |
| Vacant | Saint Raphael: 2ème circ. Pignon, Ranquitte et La Victoire | —N/a |

=== Nord-Est ===
Delegation from Nord-Est department
| Deputy | Constituency | Party |
|---|---|---|
| Vacant | Fort-Liberté: unique circ. Fort-Liberté, Ferrier et Perches | —N/a |
| Vacant | Ouanaminthe: 1ère circ. Ouanaminthe | —N/a |
| Vacant | Ouanaminthe: 2ème circ. Mont-Organisé et Capotille | —N/a |
| Vacant | Trou du Nord: 1ère circ. Trou du Nord et Caracol | —N/a |
| Vacant | Trou du Nord: 2ème circ. Ste Suzanne | —N/a |
| Vacant | Trou du Nord: 3ème circ. Terrier Rouge | —N/a |
| Vacant | Vallières: unique circ. Vallières, Carice et Mombrun Crochu | —N/a |

=== Nord-Ouest ===
Delegation from Nord-Ouest department
| Deputy | Constituency | Party |
|---|---|---|
| Vacant | Môle Saint Nicolas: 1ère circ. Môle Saint Nicolas | —N/a |
| Vacant | Môle Saint Nicolas: 2ème circ. Bombardopolis et Baie de Henne | —N/a |
| Vacant | Môle Saint Nicolas: 3ème circ. Jean Rabel | —N/a |
| Vacant | Port-de-Paix: 1ère circ. Port-de-Paix | —N/a |
| Vacant | Port-de-Paix: 2ème circ. Bassin Bleu et Chansolme | —N/a |
| Vacant | Port-de-Paix: 3ème circ. La Tortue | —N/a |
| Vacant | Saint Louis du Nord: unique circ. Saint Louis du Nord et Anse à Foleur | —N/a |

=== Ouest ===
Delegation from Ouest department
| Deputy | Constituency | Party |
|---|---|---|
| Vacant | Arcahaie: 1ère circ Arcahaie | —N/a |
| Vacant | Arcahaie: 2ème circ Cabaret | —N/a |
| Vacant | Croix des Bouquets: 1ère circ Croix des Bouquets et Thomazeau | —N/a |
| Vacant | Croix des Bouquets: 3ème circ Circ de Cornillon | —N/a |
| Vacant | Croix des Bouquets: 2ème circ Fonds Verrettes et Ganthier | —N/a |
| Vacant | La Gonave: circ. unique Anse-à-Galets et Pointe-à-Raquette | —N/a |
| Vacant | Léogâne: 1ère circ Léogâne | —N/a |
| Vacant | Léogâne: 3ème circ Circ. de Grand-Goâve | —N/a |
| Vacant | Port-au-Prince: 1ère circ Zone Nord (1) | —N/a |
| Vacant | Port-au-Prince: 2ème circ. Zone Est (2) | —N/a |
| Vacant | Port-au-Prince: 3ème circ. Zone Sud (3) | —N/a |
| Vacant | Port-au-Prince: 4ème circ. Pétion-Ville | —N/a |
| Vacant | Port-au-Prince: 5ème circ. Kenscoff | —N/a |
| Vacant | Port-au-Prince: 6ème circ. Delmas et Tabarre | —N/a |
| Vacant | Port-au-Prince: 7ème circ. Cité Soleil | —N/a |
| Vacant | Port-au-Prince: 8ème circ. Carrefour | —N/a |

=== Sud ===
Delegation from Sud department
| Deputy | Constituency | Party |
|---|---|---|
| Vacant | Aquin: 1ère circ. Aquin | —N/a |
| Vacant | Aquin: 2ème circ. Cavaillon et St Louis du Sud | —N/a |
| Vacant | Cayes: 1ère circ. Cayes et l'Ile à Vaches | —N/a |
| Vacant | Cayes: 2ème circ. Torbeck et de Chantal | —N/a |
| Vacant | Cayes: 3ème circ. Camp Perrin et de Maniche | —N/a |
| Vacant | Chardonnières: 1ère circ. Chardonnières et les Anglais | —N/a |
| Vacant | Chardonnières: 2ème circ. Tiburon et le quartier de la Cahôanne | —N/a |
| Vacant | Côteaux: 1ère circ. Coteaux | —N/a |
| Vacant | Côteaux: 3ème circ. Port à Piment | —N/a |
| Vacant | Côteaux: 2ème circ. Roche à Bateaux | —N/a |
| Vacant | Port-Salut: 1ère circ. Port-Salut | —N/a |
| Vacant | Port-Salut: 2ème circ. St Jean du Sud et d'Arniquet | —N/a |

=== Sud-Est ===
Delegation from Sud-Est department
| Deputy | Constituency | Party |
|---|---|---|
| Vacant | Bainet: 1ère circ. Bainet | —N/a |
| Vacant | Bainet: 2ème circ. Côtes de Fer | —N/a |
| Vacant | Belle Anse: 1ère circ. Belle Anse | —N/a |
| Vacant | Belle Anse: 3ème circ. Anse à Pitre | —N/a |
| Vacant | Belle Anse: 2ème circ. Thiotte et Grand Gosier | —N/a |
| Vacant | Jacmel: 1ère circ. Jacmel et le Quartier de Marbial | —N/a |
| Vacant | Jacmel: 2ème circ. La Vallée de Jacmel | —N/a |
| Vacant | Jacmel: 3ème circ. Marigot et Cayes-Jacmel | —N/a |
