= Australian contribution to UNTAG =

Australian Army contribution to the UN Transition Assistance Group

Australian Services Contingent
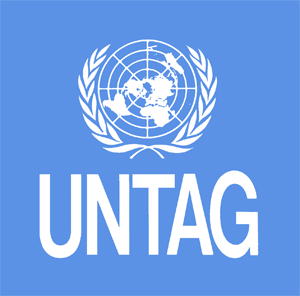
- Australia's contribution to the United Nations Transition Assistance Group
- Active: 1989–1990
- Disbanded: 1990
- Country: Namibia
- Role: Engineering
- Size: 300
- Part of: Military Component (MILCOM)
- Decorations: Australian Active Service Medal; United Nations Medal

Commanders
- Notable commanders: 1ASC: Colonel R.D. Warren, 2ASC: Colonel J.A. Crocker

The Australian Services Contingent was the Australian Army contribution to the United Nations Transition Assistance Group (UNTAG) peacekeeping mission to Namibia in 1989 and 1990. Australia sent two contingents of over 300 engineers each to assist the Special Representative of the Secretary General, Martti Ahtisaari, in overseeing free and fair elections in Namibia for a Constituent Assembly in what was the largest deployment of Australian troops since the Vietnam War.

The Australian mission was widely reported as successful. Colonel John Crocker, commander of the second Australian contingent (2ASC), wrote that the November 1989 election was UNTAG's raison d'être and observed that "the Australian contingent's complete and wide-ranging support was critical to the success of that election and hence the mission – a fact that has been acknowledged at the highest level in UNTAG". Javier Pérez de Cuéllar, Secretary-General of the United Nations, wrote to Gareth Evans (Australia's Foreign Minister) about the "remarkable contribution made by the Australian military and electoral personnel", saying that their "dedication and professionalism had been widely and deservedly praised". Although a total of 19 UN personnel lost their lives in Namibia, the two Australian contingents achieved their mission without sustaining any fatalities – one of the few military units in UNTAG to do so.

Overall, the UNTAG mission assisted Namibia in transitioning to a democratic government after the racial segregation of the apartheid system. The military forces did not fire a shot during the operation, and Mays called it "possibly the most successful UN peacekeeping operation ever fielded"; Hearn called it "one of the major successes of the United Nations". Almost 20 years later, in a message to the annual session of the United Nations Special Committee on Decolonization on 28 February 2008, UN Secretary-General Ban Ki-moon noted that "facilitating this process" constituted "one of the proudest chapters of our Organization's history".

== Background ==
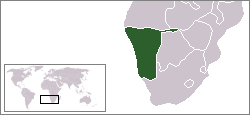
Namibia borders Angola, Botswana, South Africa and Zambia

=== History of conflict ===
Namibian Border Operational Area
- Part of the South African Border War and the Namibian War of Independence
Date	As of April 1989
Location	Southern Africa – Namibia and Angola

Belligerents
SWAPO (PLAN); Supported by: MPLA (FAPLA) Cuba (FAR)	(Union of South Africa) South Africa (SADF) Supported by: UNITA

Strength
April 1989: 5–8,000 PLAN	(South Africa) April 1989: 10,000 SADF troops 21,000 SWATF troops 6,400 SWAPOL & Koevoet

Southwest Africa has a rich history encompassing colonisation, war and genocide. The first European to set foot on Namibian soil was the Portuguese explorer Diogo Cão in 1485. Over the next 500 years, the country was colonised by the Dutch, English and Germans. Namibia was a German colony (German South-West Africa) from 1884 until its annexation by South Africa during World War I. After the war, it was mandated to South Africa by the League of Nations. After World War II the United Nations (UN) asked South Africa to place Namibia under UN trusteeship, but South Africa refused. Legal arguments continued until 1966 when the UN General Assembly resolved to end the mandate, declaring that henceforth South-West Africa was the direct responsibility of the UN.

At the height of the Cold War in 1965, conflict escalated across the border with the Cuban intervention in Angola. Cuba formed an alliance with the People's Movement for the Liberation of Angola (MPLA) (Portuguese: Movimento Popular de Libertação de Angola – Partido do Trabalho), which led to the deployment of more than 25,000 Cuban soldiers to the region in the Angolan War of Independence.

The next year the Namibian War of Independence began when the South-West Africa People's Organisation's (SWAPO) military wing – the People's Liberation Army of Namibia (PLAN) – began guerrilla attacks on South African forces, infiltrating from bases in Zambia. The first attack was the battle at Omugulugwombashe on 26 August, and the war was a classic insurgent-counterinsurgent operation. PLAN initially established bases in northern Namibia; they were later forced out of the country by the South African Defence Force (SADF), subsequently operating from bases in southern Angola and Zambia. The intensity of cross-border conflict escalated, becoming known as the South African Border War and the Angolan Bush War.

The principal protagonists were the SADF and the PLAN. Other groups involved included the South West African Territorial Force (SWATF) and National Union for Total Independence of Angola (UNITA) (both aligned with the SADF) and the People's Armed Forces for the Liberation of Angola (FAPLA) and Cuban Revolutionary Armed Forces (both aligned with SWAPO). The South African-aligned forces consisted of regular army (SADF), South West African Police forces and the South West Africa Police Counter-Insurgency Unit (SWAPOL-COIN), including the paramilitary-trained SWAPOL police counter-insurgency unit known as Koevoet.

From a Namibian perspective, the nature of the closely intertwined Angolan War of Independence, Namibian War of Independence and South African Border War was typically cross-border conflict. This was overshadowed by two large-scale Cuban military interventions in the Angolan War of Independence. The first was in November 1975 (on the eve of Angola's independence), which further intensified with the escalation of the Angolan Civil War in 1985. In that conflict, South Africa provided support across the northern border to UNITA. In opposition, the Soviet Union financially backed an estimated two motorised infantry divisions of Cuban troops in a Soviet-led the People's Armed Forces for the Liberation of Angola (FAPLA) offensive against UNITA in what became known as the second Cuban intervention in Angola. In September 1987, Cuban forces came to the defence of the besieged Angolan Army (FAPLA) and stopped the advance of the SADF at the Battle of Cuito Cuanavale (the largest battle in Africa since World War II). General Magnus Malan wrote in his memoirs that this campaign marked a great victory for the SADF. Nelson Mandela disagreed; Cuito Cuanavale, he asserted, "was the turning point for the liberation of our continent—and of my people—from the scourge of apartheid". This battle led to UN Security Council Resolution 602 of 25 November 1987, demanding the SADF's unconditional withdrawal from Angola by 10 December. When the UN force deployed to Namibia in April 1989, there were 50,000 Cuban troops in Angola.

During the 20-year war the SADF mounted many cross-border operations against PLAN bases, some of which extended 250 kilometres (160 mi) into Angola. SADF units frequently remained in southern Angola to intercept PLAN combatants on their way south, forcing PLAN to move to bases far from the Namibian border. Most PLAN insurgency operations took the form of small raids on political activists, armed propaganda activity, recruitment, raids on white settlements and disruption of essential services.

=== United Nations Transition Assistance Group ===
The process leading to Namibia's independence began with UN General Assembly Resolution 2145 (XXI) of 27 October 1966. This was followed by the passage of UN Security Council Resolution 264, adopted on 20 March 1969. In that resolution the UN assumed direct responsibility for the territory and declared the continued presence of South Africa in Namibia illegal, calling upon the Government of South Africa to withdraw immediately. International negotiations for a peaceful solution to the Namibian problem increased. In December 1978, in what was known as the Brazzaville Protocol, South Africa, Cuba and Angola formally accepted UN Security Council Resolution 435 outlining a blueprint for Namibian independence. The protocol envisioned a phased withdrawal of Cuban forces from Angola over a two-year period, set 1 April 1989 as the date for the resolution's implementation and planned to reduce South African forces in Namibia to 1,500 by June 1989. The resolution established UNTAG, approving a report by the Secretary-General and outlining its objective: "the withdrawal of South Africa's illegal administration from Namibia and the transfer of power to the people of Namibia with the assistance of the United Nations". Resolution 435 authorised a total of 7,500 military personnel as UNTAG's upper limit.

It was not until 1988 that South Africa agreed to implement the resolution, signing the Tripartite Accord (an agreement between Angola, Cuba and South Africa) at UN headquarters in New York City. The accord recommended that 1 April 1989 be set as the date for implementation of Resolution 435, and was affirmed by the Security Council on 16 January 1989. As Hearn noted, "The first characteristic of peacekeeping is that the consent of the disputants must be secured before a force is deployed". With the accord in place (principally with South Africa), UNTAG was then formally established in accordance with Resolution 632 on 16 February 1989.

The key participants in the UN process were the South African government (represented in Namibia by the Administrator General) and the UN. Hearn wrote that South Africa had a "desire for a smooth transition"; this resulted in negotiations occurring locally (between the Special Representative and the Administrator General), directly with the South African government in Pretoria and at the UN (via the Secretary General and Security Council). The outcome of these negotiations with South Africa included draft electoral laws (enabling free and fair elections) and the disbanding of the Koevoet force. The elections were carried out by the South African Administrator General, under UN supervision. The UNTAG operation ultimately involved over 100 countries, the highest ever for a UN operation. The UN had a high level of credibility, and were recognised as the legitimate body to bring independence to Namibia.

== Australian political context ==
In the Official History of Australian Peacekeeping, Humanitarian and Post-Cold War Operations, author David Horner stated that the Australian government led by Robert Menzies was loath to criticise South Africa during the 1950s. At that time Australia generally opposed anti-colonial movements (which were often supported by the Soviets or China), believing them part of a worldwide communist offensive. Indeed, as late as 1961 Australia (and Britain) abstained from a vote to condemn South Africa in the UN.

It was not until 1962 that Australia voted for a UN resolution condemning South Africa for its actions in South-West Africa, a change in policy led by External Affairs Minister Garfield Barwick. Initially in opposition, until he was Prime Minister Gough Whitlam was a vocal advocate of independence for Namibia. Over the following two decades, Australia played a small (but significant) role in supporting Namibian independence. Political leaders from both benches of Parliament, including Prime Ministers Whitlam and Malcolm Fraser, were active internationally in their support of independence for Namibia while in office. As a result, Australia was involved in the UN process almost from the start. In 1972 Australia voted in favour of a UN trust fund, and two years later it was elected to the UN Council for Namibia. Australia pledged support for UNTAG at the inception of the UN plan for Namibia with Resolution 435 in September 1978, and made an important contribution to UN deliberations about Namibia while a non-permanent member of the UN Security Council in 1985–1986.

Behind the scenes, the composition of the force Australia would contribute was not agreed in principle until late 1978; options discussed at the time were a logistic force and an infantry battalion group. By October 1978 Prime Minister Fraser had publicly stated that he wanted to send a peacekeeping force to Namibia; however, this was not broadly supported. A November 1978 article in The Bulletin claimed that the Defence Department was "dead against" a commitment, and in January 1979 The Daily Telegraph and Canberra Times reported that Fraser, Andrew Peacock (Foreign Affairs) and Jim Killen (Defence) were "involved in a row" over the plan. The following month, a Cabinet submission stated that the UN proposal had a "reasonable prospect" of success, and Cabinet approved the commitment of an engineer force of 250 officers and men and a national headquarters and support element of 50 on 19 February. Horner noted that there was very little criticism of this decision in the press at the time, and the decision was accepted without question.

After leaving government, Fraser continued to play an important role in international relations with respect to independence for Namibia. In 1985, he chaired UN hearings in New York on the role of multinationals in South Africa and Namibia. Fraser also co-chaired the Commonwealth Eminent Persons Group from 1985 to 1986, campaigning for an end to apartheid in South Africa.

Bob Hawke's government continued the policy of the Fraser and Whitlam governments to support independence for Namibia. In the Official History, Horner stated that Australian peacekeeping "blossomed" after Gareth Evans was appointed Foreign Minister in September 1988; Evans reconfirmed Australia's willingness to participate in UNTAG in October 1988, a month after his appointment. Horner also said that the commitment was "unusual" because it occurred a decade after the government's initial decision to participate in February 1979. After more than 10 years of consideration, the government reconfirmed its commitment of a force of 300 engineers to Namibia on 2 March 1989.

Our contribution to UNTAG and our involvement in the Namibian settlement makes Australia party to what may be one of the United Nations' most substantial achievements for many years. We have been involved in this process from the start. Australia has been a member of the UN Council for Namibia since 1974. We pledged our support for UNTAG at the inception of the UN plan for Namibia in 1978. Australia also made an important contribution to UN deliberations about Namibia during our recent term on the UN Security Council in 1985–1986. Our participation in UNTAG also builds on the constructive role successive Australian governments have played on southern African issues. I pay particular tribute to the achievements of my predecessor Malcolm Fraser in this regard.

— Bob Hawke, Prime Minister of Australia

There were many concerns about the size of the commitment and its risks. Before the deployment, Prime Minister Hawke said in Parliament that Namibia was a "very large and important commitment" comprising "almost half of the Army's construction engineering capability". He went on to say, "our effort in Namibia will be the largest peacekeeping commitment in which this country has ever participated. It may also be the most difficult". Unlike the commitment of soldiers to Vietnam over 20 years earlier, the deployment to Namibia had bipartisan support.

Prior to the deployment, South African authorities threatened to veto the involvement of Australian peacekeeping troops because of doubts about their impartiality. This followed the establishment by the Australian Government of a Special Assistance Program for South Africans and Namibians (SAPSAN) in 1986 to assist South Africans and Namibians disadvantaged by apartheid. The focus of SAPSAN was on education and training for the people of South Africa and Namibia, and some humanitarian assistance had also been provided. A total of $11.9 million was spent under SAPSAN from 1986 to 1990.

In the Official History, Horner described the Australian deployment to Namibia as a "vital mission": the first major deployment of troops to a war zone since the Vietnam War. In 1988 Australia had only 13 military personnel deployed on multinational peacekeeping operations, and with few exceptions the number of Australians committed to such activities had changed little in over 40 years (since the Korean War). The successful deployment of over 600 engineers to Namibia in 1989 and 1990 was pivotal in changing Australia's approach to peacekeeping, paving the way for much-larger contingents sent to Cambodia, Rwanda, Somalia and East Timor. The deployment of a significant force to Namibia profoundly affected Australia's defence and foreign policies.

== The Australian contingent and UNTAG ==
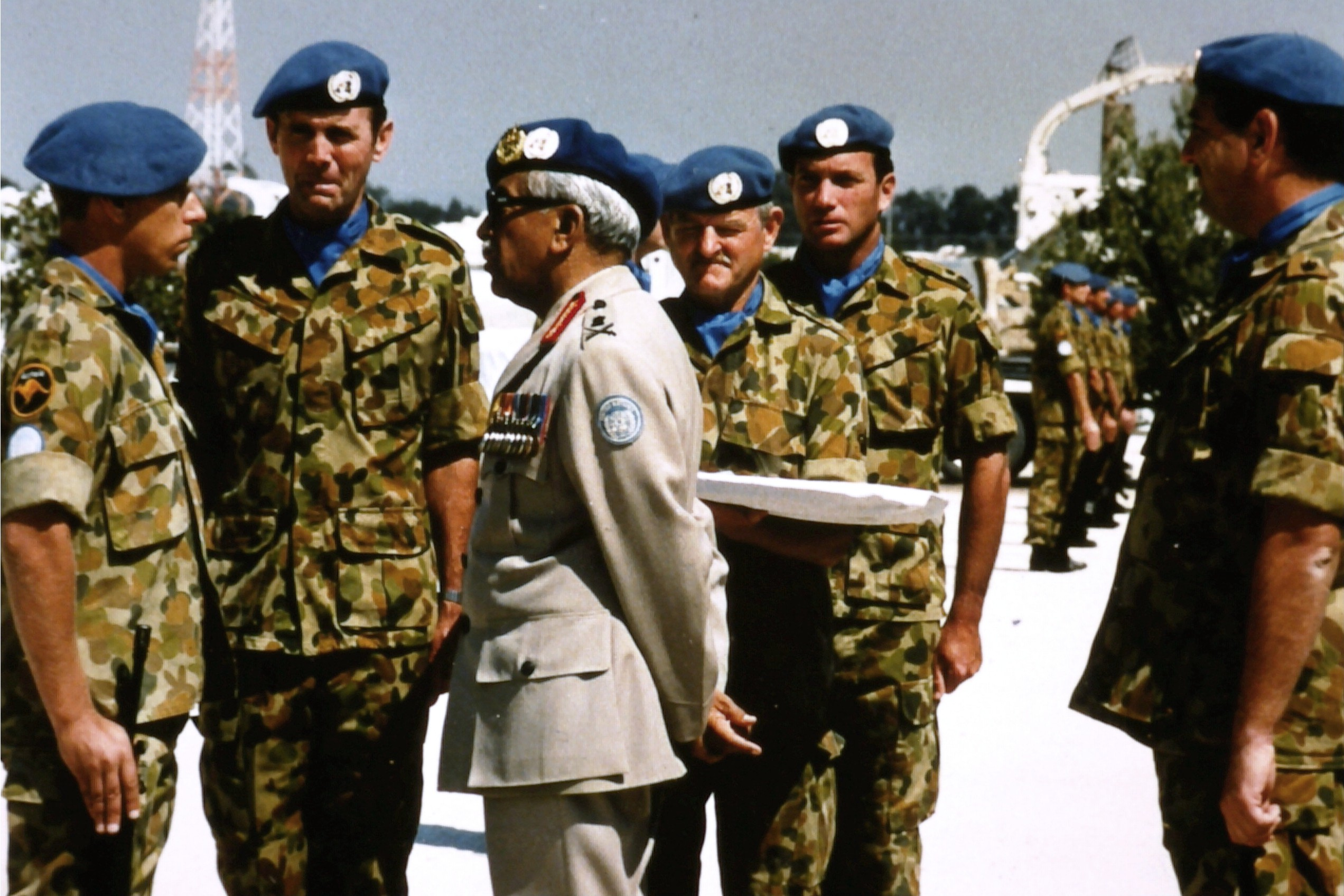
Members of the first Australian contingent Headquarters Chief Engineer UNTAG being awarded their UN medal by Lieutenant General Dewan Prem Chand at a parade at the UNTAG Headquarters in Suiderhof, Windhoek, Namibia in 1989. Left to right: Major John Hutchings, Lieutenant Colonel Kevin Pippard, Warrant Officer Class 2 Peter Bruce, Lieutenant General Dewan Prem Chand, Colonel Richard Warren and Sergeant Steven Lavery

=== Command ===
UNTAG was a large operation, with nearly 8,000 men and women deployed to Namibia from more than 120 countries to assist the process. The military force numbered approximately 4,500, and was commanded by Lieutenant General Dewan Prem Chand of India; the main military UNTAG Headquarters was in Windhoek, Namibia's capital and largest city. The commanders of the Australian contingents were Colonels Richard D. Warren (1ASC) and John A. Crocker (2ASC). Other senior appointments included the contingent seconds-in-command, Lieutenant Colonels Kevin Pippard (1ASC) and Ken Gillespie (2ASC), and the officers commanding the 17th Construction Squadron, Majors David Crago (1ASC) and Brendan Sowry (2ASC).

=== Mission and role of UNTAG ===
UNTAG's mission was to monitor the ceasefire and troop withdrawals, to preserve law and order in Namibia and to supervise elections for the new government. In the Official History, Horner described it as "an extremely complex mission".

The role of UNTAG was to assist the Special Representative of the Secretary General (SRSG), Martti Ahtisaari, in overseeing free and fair elections in Namibia for a Constituent Assembly. The elections were to be carried out by the South African Administrator General, under UN supervision and control, (Note: Sitkowski noted that this was a political compromise, because the South African administration was considered illegal.) and this Assembly would then draw up a constitution for an independent Namibia. UNTAG was tasked with assisting the SRSG in ensuring that all hostile acts ceased; South African troops were confined to base, and ultimately withdrawn; discriminatory laws were repealed, and political prisoners released; Namibian refugees were permitted to return (when they were known as returnees); intimidation was prevented, and law and order maintained.

UNTAG was the first instance of a large-scale, multidimensional operation where the military element supported the work of other components concerned with border surveillance: monitoring the reduction and removal of the South African military presence; organising the return of Namibian exiles; supervising voter registration and preparing, observing, and certifying the results of national elections.

=== Role of Australian contingent ===
The role of the Australian force was broad for an Army engineering unit, requiring the unit to "provide combat and logistic engineer support to UNTAG"; this included the UN civilian and military components. Its role included construction, field engineering and (initially) deployment as infantry.

Prime Minister Hawke said in Parliament at the time that "the settlement of the long and complex issue of Namibian independence is an important international event. It is an event in which Australia has played, and will continue to play, a substantial part ... Namibia is a large, arid, sparsely populated and underdeveloped country which has been a war zone for many years. Our engineers will build roads, bridges, airstrips and camps for UNTAG. They will have the very serious task of clearing mines which have been laid by the various contending forces along the border between Angola and Namibia".

=== Organisation and composition of contingents ===
The Australian force was structured as follows:

- A Headquarters (Chief Engineer ASC UNTAG) with operations, works, accommodations, communications, finance, logistics and personnel cells
- A Construction Squadron group based on the 17th Construction Squadron (Royal Australian Engineers) with two construction troops (the 8th and 9th Troops), the 14th Field Troop, a Resources Troop, a Plant Troop and the attached Royal Australian Electrical and Mechanical Engineers Workshop

There were two contingents, each of which contained over three hundred soldiers and deployed for about six months:

- 1ASC consisted of 304 members, and was principally drawn from the 17th Construction Squadron, the Workshop and the 14th Field Troop from the 7th Field Squadron in Brisbane. The contingents also included soldiers from the Royal Australian Corps of Signals, Royal Australian Army Pay Corps, Australian Army Legal Corps, Royal Australian Corps of Military Police, Royal Australian Corps of Transport, Royal Australian Army Ordnance Corps, Australian Army Catering Corps and the Royal Australian Army Medical Corps.
- 2ASC consisted of 309 personnel, with members of 78 different units. The second contingent included the 15th Field Troop from the 18th Field Squadron in Townsville, fourteen members of the Corps of Royal New Zealand Engineers (RNZE), five Australian Army Reserve (ARES) members and one Royal Australian Air Force officer (Flight Lieutenant Craig Forster). The New Zealand engineers (under Lieutenant Jed Shirley) were spread throughout the squadron. The second contingent also included a detachment from the Royal Australian Corps of Military Police, led by Sergeant Tim Dewar.

In addition to the military force, a number of other Australians served with UNTAG (including 25 observers from the Australian Electoral Commission). For the duration of the deployment, the Australian Department of Foreign Affairs and Trade and Defence had agreed to jointly fund a temporary Australian Liaison Office in Windhoek staffed by two DFAT personnel and headed by Nick Warner.

== Force preparation and deployment ==
=== First ten years ===
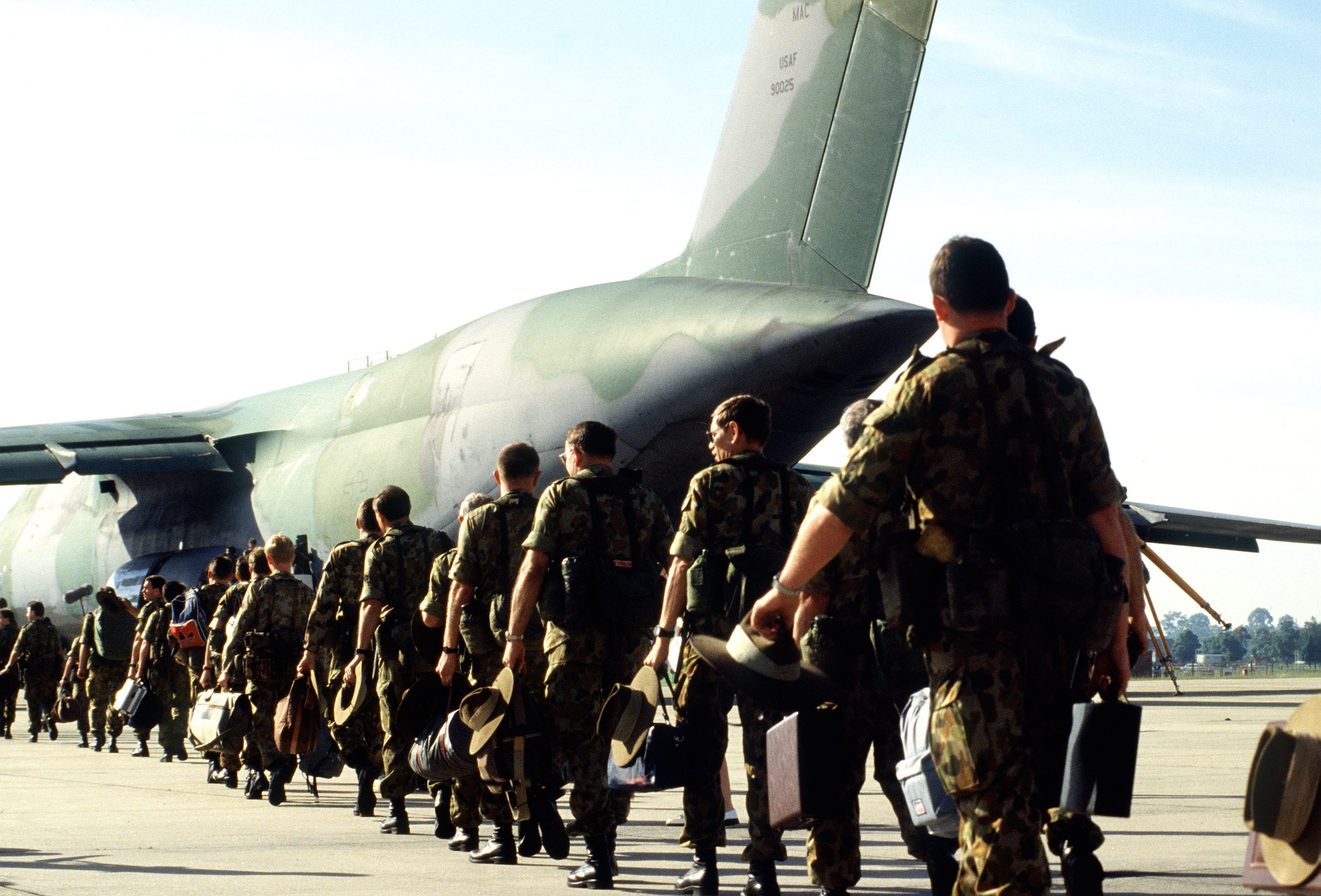
Australian engineers of the advance party board the United States C-5 Galaxy aircraft which will transport them to Namibia in March 1989.

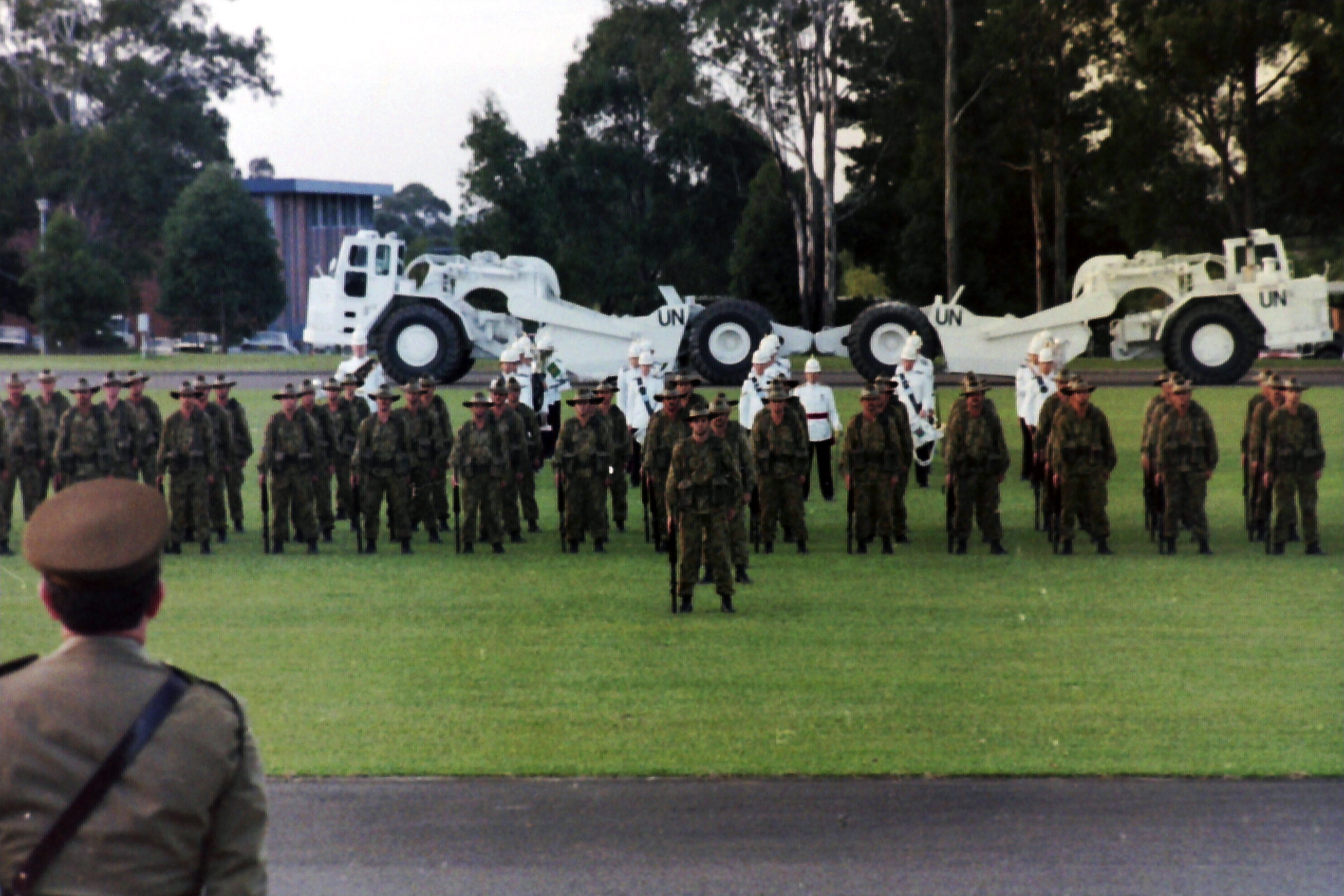
Farewell parade for the main body of the Australian contingent, UNTAG at Holsworthy Barracks on 5 April 1989. The parade was reviewed by Prime Minister Bob Hawke.

Australian Army involvement in UNTAG was formalised in February 1979 by Cabinet, which approved the plan to commit the 17th Construction Squadron, Royal Australian Engineers and Workshop as the main force for deployment. The squadron was to be supplemented by a Field Troop and by members posted from other units throughout the Army, bringing the squadron to a deployment strength of 275. A headquarters was to be formed, supporting the Chief Engineer at the UNTAG Military Headquarters. The total strength of the force was to be over 300 of all ranks, in what was known as Plan Witan. The unit had been placed on eight weeks' notice in July 1978, which was reduced to a week's notice to move in February 1979.

There was no agreement (or settlement) between South Africa and SWAPO, so an order to move was never issued. The Official History noted, "as the weeks passed the unit found it difficult to continue training because all its vehicles, equipment and plant were either in boxes or in a state ready for transhipment". The notice to move reverted to 30 days in June and pushed out to 42 days in September 1979, when the unit was formally released from standby. The notice to move was increased to 60 days in March 1982, and 75 days in November 1986. In July 1987, all remaining specific readiness requirements were removed.

=== Activation ===
Horner wrote that the government had been following the course of negotiations, "but in view of the history of false alarms they were not inclined to react until Angola, Cuba and South Africa signed the protocol in Geneva" in August 1988. Two weeks later the UN wrote, asking Australia to reconfirm its previous commitment; within a month, Cabinet reaffirmed the commitment of a decade earlier. Chief of the Defence Force (CDF) General Peter Gration then placed the unit on 28 days' notice to move.

After the notice was reactivated, detailed planning recommenced (essentially from scratch). Changes made to the organisation of the force approved ten years earlier were only minor. After many years of notice, there was still skepticism that the deployment would ever occur. The government and army were cautious about the timing of the commitment of funds; significant funding was only released in late 1988, a few months before deployment. The squadron's equipment deficiencies were valued at $16 million, and there was a need to buy $700,000 of equipment immediately. The UN initially estimated the cost of the entire operation at $US1 billion, equivalent to its own budget. The reluctance to commit funds ultimately reduced training of the deployed forces; Senator Jo Vallentine said in Parliament that the Namibia operation nearly fell apart due to a lack of advance funding, and Senator Jocelyn Newman called it disgraceful. The UN General Assembly did not approve the UNTAG budget until 1 March 1989, less than two weeks before the advance party deployed and after the deployment of the start-up team. Gration authorised Operation Picaresque on 3 March 1989. (Note: Gration, the Chief of the Defence Force at the time issued two directives in the first week of March, one to the Chief of the General Staff, Lieutenant General Lawrence O'Donnell (CDF Directive 1/1989), ordering him to provide an engineer force to Namibia in an operation to be known as Operation Picaresque. The second directive (CDF 2/1989) was to Warren, appointing him commander of the Australian contingent, a "national command appointment" in which he was to report directly to the CDF on matters relating to national policy.) In addition to a lack of funds, there was little intelligence on Namibia; the region was "generally unknown to the Australian public, the policy-makers and to the troops and civilians who deployed there".

=== Buildup and deployment ===
The first staff were posted to the new contingent headquarters at Holsworthy Barracks in September 1988. At the same time, Major J.J. Hutchings was deployed as liaison officer to UN HQ in New York. In October, the CDF formally tasked the Chief of the General Staff (CGS) to raise, train, equip and support the force for Namibia. By December the two units comprising 1ASC had been raised from more than thirty different units of the Australian Army, and were being trained and prepared for deployment. Equipment, vehicles and weapons were procured, transferred from across the army and prepared at Moorebank; this included the painting of all vehicles and major equipment items in UN livery and packing items for transport to Namibia. During the buildup it was recognised that the families required support during the deployment, and Network 17 was established to support the mostly Sydney-based soldiers' and officers' families.

Hutchings was sent to Namibia as a member of the start-up team, arriving in Windhoek on 19 February 1989. Warren attended the contingent commanders' briefing at UN HQ from 22 to 24 February 1989, and then flew with Prem Chand to Frankfurt, West Germany to meet the other senior members of UNTAG.

This will not be an easy process. Since the Transition Period in Namibia began on 1 April, there have already been serious clashes between members of SWAPO on one hand and elements of the Namibian police and the South African Defence Forces on the other. The clashes have been serious and bloody. More than two hundred people have been killed. The situation is still tense and serious.

— Bob Hawke, Prime Minister of Australia, 5 April 1989

The 1ASC advance party, comprising 36 officers and men, were deployed by USAF C-5 Galaxy via RAAF Learmonth and Diego Garcia to Windhoek. They arrived at 2:00 pm on 11 March 1989 and were met by Australian Ambassador to South Africa Colin MacDonald, Warren and Hutchings. The 17th Construction Squadron advance party of ten deployed by road to Grootfontein on 13 March 1989. The squadron's advance echelon, comprising 59 personnel (including the 14th Field Troop), arrived by USAF C5 Galaxy at Grootfontein on 14 March 1989. The remainder of 1ASC were commended by Prime Minister Bob Hawke at a farewell parade at Holsworthy Barracks on 5 April 1989. The main body then deployed by RAAF Boeing 707 aircraft on 14 April.

The force deployed with a large quantity of construction and other equipment, including 24 Land Rovers, 19 Unimog all-terrain vehicles, 26 heavy trucks, 43 trailers, eight bulldozers and a variety of other road-building equipment such as graders, scrapers and rollers. The support workshop added a further 40 vehicles, and over 1,800 tonnes of stores were shipped with the contingent's equipment. There was a total of over 200 wheeled and tracked vehicles and trailers and a large quantity of dangerous cargo (demolition explosives and ammunition). The UN hired the MV Mistra for the deployment. It departed Sydney on 23 March; the equipment was unloaded at Walvis Bay in mid-April, moving by road and rail to the South African Defence Force Logistics Base at Grootfontein.

== Operations ==
=== Operations Safe Passage and Piddock ===
Main unit and sub-unit deployment locations

By 31 March, 14th Field Troop had completed its mine-awareness training; only Lieutenant Stephen Alexander and five others remained at Oshakati, the main SADF base in the north of the country. During the early hours of 1 April an SADF aircraft began dropping flares, and mortar rounds landed near the base. This signalled the start of an intense period of conflict, and Alexander's team was quickly withdrawn to Grootfontein. What had occurred was the infiltration of a large number of PLAN combatants (about 1,600), re-entering Namibia from Angola. (Note: The Associated Press reported that 1,900 SWAPO guerillas crossed the border.) Accounts differed, but Hearn stated that all of those interviewed at the time made it clear that "they did not enter Namibia for war, but to seek out the UN". Reuters reported that SWAPO demanded the right to establish bases in Namibia. The large size of the PLAN forces and the very small number of deployed UN forces (less than 1,000 at the time) meant that the UN had very little intelligence, and was unable to respond in force. Sitkowski wrote that the UN should have been informed about the high probability of SWAPO infiltration, but this did not occur. The Australians were the first to know about the incursion, but they only found out informally via church sources at the Pastoral Centre (the accommodations for headquarters staff).

The UN had only two police observers in the north of the country at the time, and the South African government pressured the UN to allow its forces to leave their bases and respond. On 1 April the SRSG authorised the SADF to leave their bases, and they responded in force. By 5 April the UN reported that it only had 300 troops in the north of the country, including 97 Australians. On 7 April Reuters reported that Louis Pienaar had assured safe passage out of the war-torn north of the country if fighting ceased, and had called on SWAPO to surrender to the police; he also warned that if they did not respond, "the police will have no other option than to pursue you with all means at their disposal". Reuters reported that 73 SWAPO guerillas were killed on 8 April, 34 in a single action. It was later estimated that over the three-week period following the incursion 251 PLAN combatants were killed, with the loss of 21 members of the SADF and other security forces. (Note: The South Africans claimed that the Koevoet killed 294 insurgents and captured 14, while the SADF and SWATF killed another 18 and captured 26. The police lost 20 killed and the SADF five.)

The SWAPO incursion became a complex political issue, and led to a week of tense negotiations. The UN considered emergency airlifts to bring more peacekeepers into the territory, and the United States offered aid. On 9 April 1989 an agreement was reached at Mount Etjo (Note: A game park outside Otjiwarongo in central-north Namibia.) (the Mount Etjo Declaration), calling for the rapid deployment of UNTAG forces and outlining a withdrawal procedure for PLAN soldiers (Operation Safe Passage) under which they would leave the country. Operation Piddock was the name for the Australian part of the operation. Horner wrote that if UNTAG were to play any role in ending the fighting, it was obvious that the Australians would be the key component. This was complex, and required authorisation from Gration and Defence Minister Kim Beazley for Australian troops to supervise the withdrawal of insurgent forces. It required the Australian Army engineers and British signallers to work as infantry, manning border and internal-assembly points. At the time, these were the only units which could be redeployed quickly to northern Namibia.

The aim of the operation was to facilitate the withdrawal of PLAN combatants. South African Foreign Minister Pik Botha confined all South African troops to their base for 60 hours, allowing SWAPO guerillas to leave the country unhindered. (Note: The Independent reported that Hidipo Hamutenya, SWAPO's Head of Information in London stated that eighteen SWAPO guerillas had been "shot in the back as they tried to cross the border".) Nine assembly points were established by the UN, with up to twelve soldiers and five military observers at each. Six of the assembly points (APs) were led by Australians: Captain Richard Bradshaw (contingent signals officer) at AP Charlie (Ruacana), Sergeant Kerry Ponting (Squadron workshop) at AP Foxtrot (Oshikango), Captain Mark Hender (Squadron Operations Officer) at AP Juliet (Okankolo), Lieutenant Stephen Alexander (Field troop commander) at AP Delta (Beacon 7, west of Oshikango), Lieutenant Mark Broome (Plant Troop Officer) AP Bravo (Ruacana) and Lieutenant Pat Sowry (Liaison Officer) AP Kilo (Oshikuku). Most of the assembly points had intense media scrutiny. The intention of the operation was for PLAN combatants to assemble at these points. They would then be escorted across the border north to the 16th parallel to their bases of confinement, but the operation was unsuccessful. Very few PLAN combatants passed through these points; for the most part, they withdrew across the border by walking independently. It was estimated that 200 to 400 PLAN members remained in Namibia, absorbed into the local community. Agreement was subsequently reached in late April that the SADF personnel be restricted to their bases from 26 April; in effect, hostilities ended after that date.

This was a stressful time for Australian soldiers deployed to these checkpoints. The South Africans were determined to intimidate the UN forces, and SWAPO casualties occurred in the immediate vicinity of several checkpoints. The South Africans set up in force immediately adjacent to many checkpoints, pointed machine guns at the Australians and demanded that they hand over SWAPO soldiers who had surrendered. The Australian and British soldiers were outnumbered and out-gunned. Despite the fact that only nine SWAPO appeared at the points, the operation was a political success. Lieutenant Colonel Neil Donaldson, commander of the British contingent, said that "the world press showed Australian and British soldiers standing up to a bunch of South African bullies". Crocker said that the fact that the Australian soldiers completed this operation without any casualties was a tribute to the "training standards of the Australian Army and perhaps, a bit of good luck". The conclusion of Operation Piddock meant that the Australians were able to begin their engineering tasks.

=== Return of refugees ===
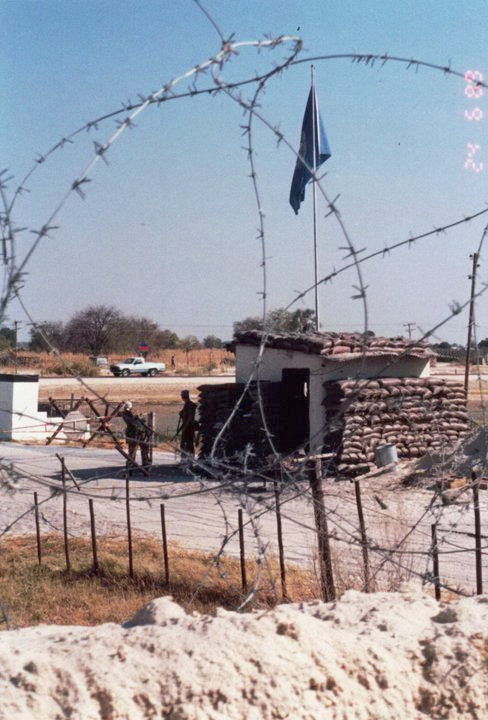
Front entrance to the Australian base at Ondangwa occupied by 9th Construction Troop on 24 June 1989

The UN plan required that all exiled Namibians be given the opportunity to return to their country in time to participate in the electoral process. This was implemented by the United Nations High Commissioner for Refugees (UNHCR), supported by a number of other UN agencies and programmes. In Namibia, the Council of Churches in Namibia (CCN) was UNHCR's implementing partner. Most returning Namibians returned from Angola; many came from Zambia, and a small number came from 46 other countries after the proclamation of a general amnesty. The logistics of managing the returnees was largely delegated to the Australian contingent.

Three air and three land entry points were established, as well as five reception centres. Four centres were designed by Namibia Consult Incorporated under the directorship of Klaus Dierks, and constructed by the Australian contingent. The centres were located at Dobra, Mariabronn (near Grootfontein) and at Ongwediva and Engela in Ovamboland. They were administered under the auspices of the Repatriation, Resettlement and Reconstruction Committee of the CCN.

The 8th Construction Troop (under Lieutenant Geoff Burchell) constructed a camp and managed the reception centre at Engela, less than 5 kilometres (3.1 mi) from the Angolan border; the 9th Construction Troop (under Lieutenant Andrew Stanner) constructed a similar camp and managed the reception centre at Ongwediva. The SADF continued attempts to intimidate the Australians and disrupt operations, but their actions had little effect. In late April an SADF aircraft dropped flares at night over the 9th Construction Troop base at Ongwediva, and explosions (possibly mortar rounds) were heard nearby.

Security, services and logistics at the reception centres were provided by the military component of UNTAG, and a number of secondary reception centres were also established. The movement of returnees through the centres was quick, and the repatriation programme was very successful; a UN official report stated that the psychological impact of the return of so many exiles was perceptible throughout the country. There were some problems reported in the north, where ex-Koevoet elements searched villages for SWAPO returnees; however, the UN reported that this was kept under constant surveillance by UNTAG's police monitors. By the end of the process, 42,736 Namibians had been returned from exile.

=== Accommodation and other works ===
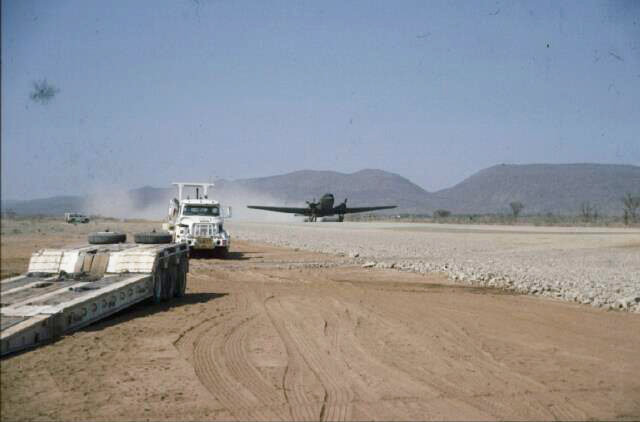
Opuwo airstrip during upgrade by the 17th Construction Squadron during its deployment. This project was undertaken in support of the local community as a nation-building exercise.

For the remainder of its deployment, the first contingent focused most of its efforts on providing accommodations for electoral centres and police stations. These were typically staffed by only two or three police (or civilian) electoral personnel and were almost always in small, remote villages. Buildings were leased, a large number of caravans purchased and deployed and prefabricated buildings constructed in about 50 locations. Much of this was done by the Resources Troop (under Lieutenant Stuart Graham), centrally controlled by squadron construction officer Captain Shane Miller.

The largest plant task undertaken during the deployment was the construction of an airstrip at Opuwo. The squadron commander, Major David Crago, described how the road network in Namibia was better than expected; in retrospect, the squadron brought too much heavy road-making equipment. The squadron deployed 20 members of the Plant Troop (under Captain Nigel Catchlove) to Opuwo. Over a period of four months, Sergeant Ken Roma constructed an all-weather airstrip in one of the most remote parts of Namibia.

=== Force rotation ===
The first contingent returned to Australia in September and October 1989, Warren reporting that he was "amazed that none of his men was killed or seriously hurt during the tour of duty". Planning for the second contingent had begun as soon as the first contingent had deployed. Colonel John Crocker was appointed as the contingent commander, and was given the task of raising the force. Unlike the first contingent, which had been built around the 17th Construction Squadron and had maintained that unit's structure, the second contingent had to be built from scratch. It deployed to Namibia between September and early October 1989.

=== Election preparation and Operation Poll Gallop ===
The security environment in Namibia changed in the lead-up to the election, including violence in Namibia and an increase in fighting between FAPLA and UNITA troops across the border in Angola. Horner wrote that the Australian contingent was not directly involved in "dealing with the violence", but the increased violence changed the nature of the mission. It was initially envisioned that the military component of UNTAG would only provide communications and logistic support to the election. In September the role was broadened to include hundreds of electoral monitors, and in October (after detailed planning and reconnaissance of all polling stations) the Australian contingent deployed a ready-reaction force. At the same time the 15th Field Troop (under Lieutenant Brent Maddock) was deployed, making the first entry into a live minefield by Australian troops since the Vietnam War.

Operation Poll Gallop was the name given to the largely logistic operation to support the Namibian elections. Activities began with 1ASC from May 1989 onward, but became the primary task for 2ASC:

- Service support: Support was provided to approximately 500 electoral centres and police stations through the siting and erection of permanent (or portable) accommodations and the provision of essential services. UNTAG deployed over 350 polling stations; the Australian contingent constructed and provided support (including sanitary facilities) at 120 stations in the northern areas of Kaokoland, Ovamboland and West Hereroland.
- Construction engineering: This included the construction, modification or upgrade of UNTAG working and living accommodations, provision of essential services (power, water and air-traffic-control facilities) and the maintenance and upgrade of roads.
- Ready Reaction Force: The squadron formed a reinforced Field Troop (50 soldiers) in Buffel mine-proof vehicles as a ready-reaction force at Ondangwa, deploying to the 15 most-sensitive locations in Ovamboland and practising actions to stabilise a hostile (but not violent) situation in which Australians might be involved. On two occasions during the November 1989 election, the ASC Ready-Reaction Force was used to disperse rioters.
- Australian military electoral monitors: The Australian contingent provided a team of thirty monitors headed by Lieutenant Colonel Peter Boyd, legal officer for the second contingent.

Colonel John Crocker, commander of 2ASC, wrote: "For much of the mission, but particularly during the lead-up to the election, all members of the ASC worked, often well away from their bases, in a security environment which at best could be termed uneasy and on many occasions was definitely hazardous. The deeply divided political factions, which included thousands of de-mobilised soldiers from both sides, had easy access to weapons including machine guns and grenades. This situation resulted in a series of violent incidents including assassinations and reprisal killings which culminated in the deaths of 11 civilians and the wounding of 50 others in street battles in the northern town of Oshakati just before the election". Land mines and unexploded ammunition continued to cause injury and death; even during the week of the election, there were incidents.

=== Post-election and return to Australia ===
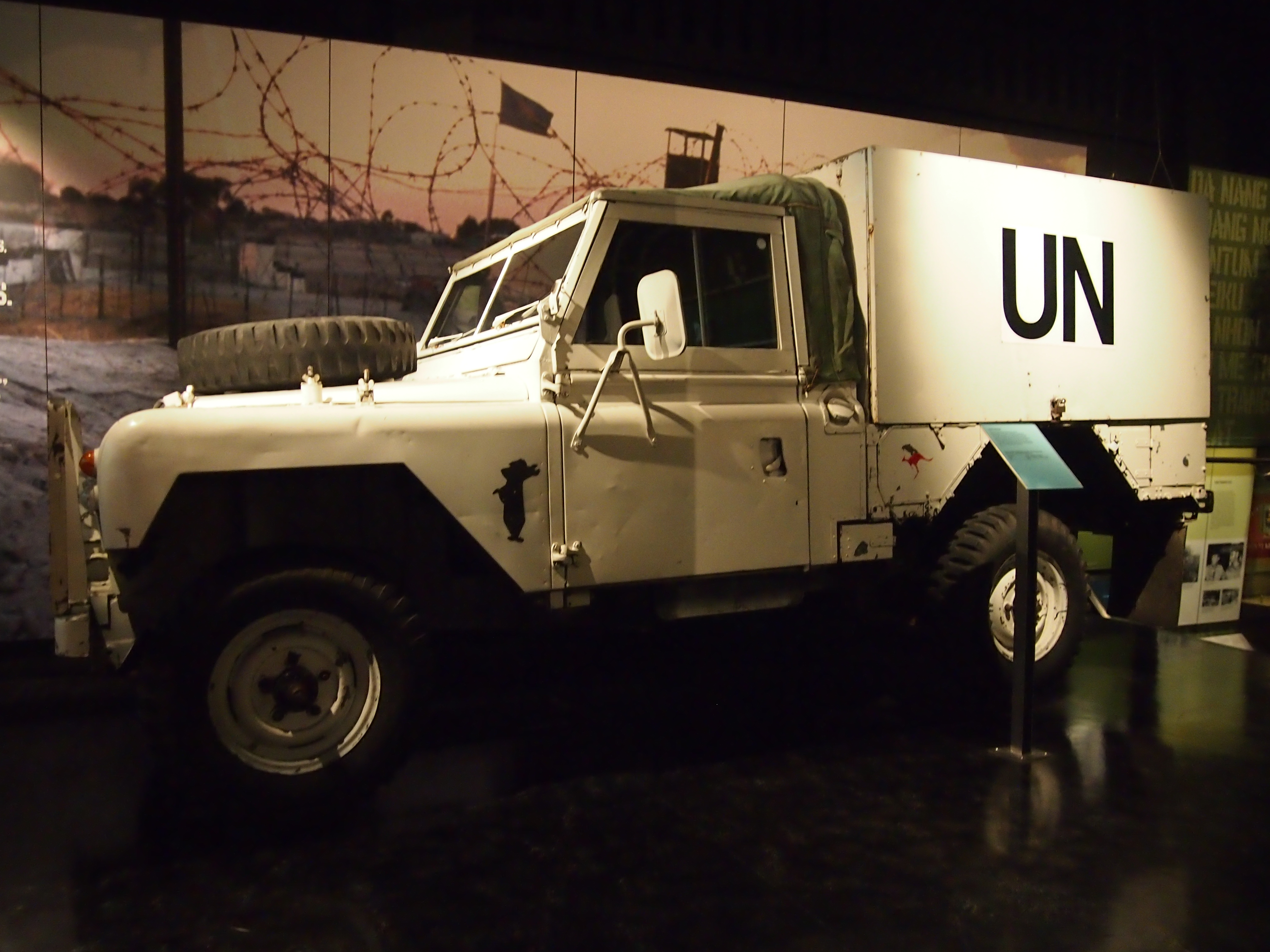
Land Rover used in Namibia on display at the Australian War Memorial, 2012

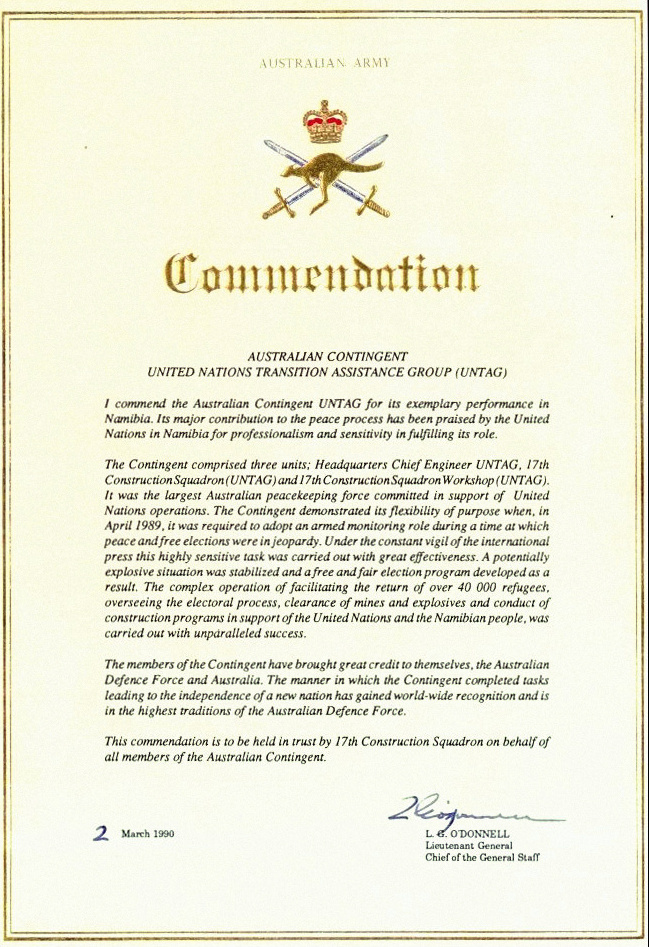
Copy of the CGS Commendation presented to the Australian contingent to UNTAG

After the election, the contingent was able to focus almost exclusively on construction tasks. In addition to ongoing maintenance, these included taking over barracks and accommodations from the SADF and twelve non-UNTAG tasks in support of the local community as nation-building exercises. These included:

- Opuwo airfield: The major task was the completion of the airfield upgrade at Opuwo begun by the first contingent. A detachment from Captain Kurt Heidecker's Plant Troop, supported by a section from 9th Construction Troop, worked over Christmas to complete these works (which included resurfacing and shaping the runway, drainage and installing culverts).
- Andara Catholic Mission hydroelectric plant: A team under Lieutenant Nick Rowntree upgraded a 900-metre supply channel for the Andara hydroelectric plant.
- Classrooms in Tsumeb: Sappers from the rear of the squadron constructed a number of classrooms for an Anglican school in a black neighbourhood in Tsumeb with funds provided by the Australian Liaison Office.

Other tasks carried out by the squadron included Operation Make Safe, which took place in February and March 1990. The Field Troop conducted a reconnaissance of 10 known minefields, repaired perimeter fences and installed signs.

The contingent began preparations for its return to Australia in December 1989. In January 1990 new works stopped, manning of forward bases was reduced and stores and equipment were packed and prepared for sea. The Australian forces returned in four sorties on chartered commercial aircraft, the first departing Namibia on 6 February. The contingent's equipment loaded aboard the MV Kwang Tung, which left Walvis Bay on 22 February. The withdrawal included support from Australian logistics experts, a psychologist to conduct end-of-tour debriefings and a finance officer. The last demolition task was undertaken at Ondangwa on 25 March, and the last elements of the rear party left Namibia on 9 April 1990. During the deployment there were no fatalities; although at least 10 soldiers were treated for malaria, there were few serious injuries.

== Commendations and Honour Distinction award ==
17 Construction Squadron is awarded the Honour Distinction, Namibia 1989–1990, in recognition of its creditable performance in support of the United Nations Transition Assistance Group operation to manage the transition of Namibia to independence in 1990. Despite being deployed to provide engineering support, when the ceasefire broke down at the start of the mission, members of the squadron helped establish Assembly Points, which enabled the mission to continue. This activity was conducted in the face of hostility from elements of the former colonial power and personal danger arising from the breakdown of the cease fire. Later, 17 Construction Squadron became involved in the election process itself, providing security, transport and logistic support to election officials, monitors, other UN personnel, voters and polling stations. Members of 17 Construction Squadron ensured that, as much as possible, the election was able to proceed without interruption or interference and ensured that all parties were free from intimidation or duress. With the selfless support of individuals from other units of the Australian Defence Force, 17 Construction Squadron played a key role in the smooth and effective transition of Namibia from colonial rule to independence. The Squadron performed a role well beyond what was expected and brought great credit on itself, the Australian Army and Australia.

— "Letter from the Chief of Army to the Governor General". Letter to. Army Headquarters, Canberra. 10 April 2012.

A number of governments linked the award of the Nobel Peace Prize to UN Peacekeepers in 1988 to the UNTAG operation, but the award was shared by peacekeepers and peacekeeping operations worldwide. Secretary-General Javier Pérez de Cuéllar mentioned a number of UN peacekeeping operations (including Namibia) in his Nobel lecture in Oslo on 9 January 1989. Senator Graham Richardson also made similar comments in the Australian Senate.

The Australian UNTAG contingents were awarded a Chief of the General Staff Commendation. The award was presented to both contingents by Defence Minister Beazley at a 2 March 1990 parade in Holsworthy honouring those who had served in eleven UN (and other) peacekeeping operations. (Note: The commendation was held in trust by 17th Construction Squadron but was destroyed in a fire, although copies had been made.) Colonels Warren and Crocker were also appointed Members of the Order of Australia for their command of the Australian contingents, while two members were awarded Medals of the Order of Australia and two others received Conspicuous Service Medals.

In April 2012, Chief of Army Lieutenant General David Morrison approved a recommendation for the award of the first Honour Distinction to the 17th Construction Squadron. This is awarded to units (or sub-units) in recognition of service under operational conditions in security-related, peacekeeping, peace enforcement and similar operations. The award was presented to the unit by Governor-General Quentin Bryce on 11 May 2013.

== Operational and other issues ==
=== Force Chief Engineer ===
The appointment of Colonel Richard Warren as Chief Engineer was opposed by both Marrack Goulding (UN Undersecretary General for Special Political Affairs) and Cedric Thornberry (Director of the Office of the Special Representative of the Secretary-General). The UN had planned on a civilian filling this role and working primarily with civilian contractors; in all subsequent UN missions, the senior engineer was a civilian. The UN resisted appointing Warren until the "last minute", with final approval only given on 1 March. Warren recalled that this gave him "an abnormal amount of authority and a remarkable degree of responsibility".

=== Weapons and rules of engagement ===
The contingents were faced with a number of issues concerning weapons and rules of engagement:

- Rules of Engagement: A major issue for the contingents concerned Rules of Engagement (ROE) and Orders for Opening Fire (OFOF). In 1989 the UN had no doctrine in this area, and was unable to develop any during the mission. The Australian contingent used standard ROE prepared before the deployment.
- Machine guns: The UN required the Australians to deploy without the belt-fed M60 machine gun, the standard section-level automatic weapon at the time. Instead, the contingent was required to deploy with World War II-vintage Bren light machine guns, since these used only a 30-round magazine (the weapons had been rebuilt to accept 7.62mm ammunition).
- Deployment without weapons: On a number of occasions, soldiers were asked to deploy without weapons by UNTAG civilian officials. Early in the deployment Lieutenants Burchell and Stanner were asked by UNHCR to conduct an unarmed reconnaissance, but permission was refused. Near the election, Australian military electoral monitors were asked to deploy in civilian clothes without weapons.

=== Land mines and UXO ===
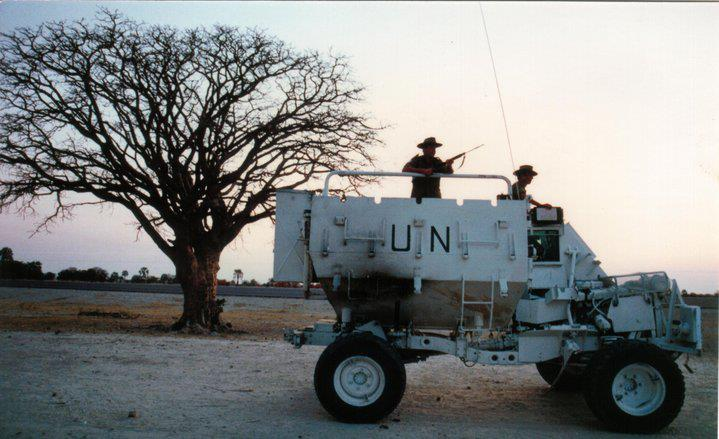
Field engineers from the 14th Field Troop on patrol in Owamboland (near Ongwediva) in a Buffel mine-protected vehicle

Land mines were used by the SADF and SWAPO and became a major feature of the war, triggering the development of mine-protected vehicles (MPV). The SADF typically laid marked, fenced, anti-personnel minefields as perimeter protection for bases and vital assets. It laid a reported 45,000 mines during the conflict, of which 3,000 were unaccounted-for when UNTAG arrived. SWAPO used mines for ambushing or intimidation. Mines were laid individually or in clusters; anti-tank mines were often stacked. The mines were obtained from South Africa, the USSR, Czechoslovakia and Yugoslavia. After initial training by the SADF's 25th Field Squadron, an early task of the Field Troop was to conduct mine-awareness training for the other contingents. For the remainder of the deployment, much of the work of the 75 field engineers was clearing exposed mines, marking minefields and clearing routes. Crocker wrote, "for the first time since the Vietnam War, Australian Sappers hand cleared their way into live minefields on seven separate occasions to destroy exposed mines. Similar mines killed several civilians and many animals during the mission. Field engineers of the contingent destroyed over 5,000 items of unexploded ordnance (UXO) ranging from artillery shells, through RPG rockets to grenades. UXO, a legacy of the 20-year Bush War, posed a major hazard to local inhabitants in the northern provinces and to UNTAG personnel in that area".

To support the deployment, the UN leased a number of mine-protected vehicles from the SADF. Most were Buffels, but smaller numbers of Casspir and Wolf vehicles were also leased. These vehicles had excellent mobility, and were well-suited to operations in the harsh Namibian terrain. The contingent also trialled thermal-intensifier technologies, in what is thought to be the first operational use of this technology.

=== Radio communications ===
One of the major difficulties early in the deployment to Namibia was poor radio communications. The Australian contingent was equipped with PRC-F1 HF radios (manufactured by AWA), first issued to the Australian army in 1969. Output power was limited to one or ten watts PEP. HF radio communications were frequently impossible in the early month or two of the deployment. The primary factor was the March 1989 geomagnetic storm, exacerbated by skip zone, and ground plane effects resulting from the sandy environment and the high water table. Detachments were often out of radio contact for extended periods, with no satisfactory alternate means of communication except couriers. Because the Australian force operated over large distances, with troop deployments often up to 700 kilometres (430 mi) from squadron or force headquarters, courier communications often took days. Later in the deployment, the UN provided the contingent with higher-powered (100W) Motorola Micom X state-of-the-art HF equipment.

=== Controversy and intimidation ===
A number of observers noted that the UNTAG soldiers were not particularly popular with Namibia's 80,000 white residents. Shortly after the Australian advance party arrived in Namibia a pro-Pretoria newspaper accused Australian officers of breaching UN impartiality by attending a cocktail party at which leading members of SWAPO were present, and the incident was widely reported in the international press. Soon afterwards, four Australian and four British soldiers were beaten by a large crowd in Tsumeb, about 70 kilometres (43 mi) from squadron headquarters in Grootfontein. During the first few weeks of the deployment, on a number of occasions SADF soldiers discharged firearms in the direction of the Australian contingent or pointed firearms at Australians as a means of intimidation. Corporal Paul Shepherd reported that during Operation Piddock, an SADF soldier threw a grenade (which did not explode) at his assembly point near Ruacana; during the night the South Africans fired in their direction, putting bullet holes in their Unimog truck.

=== Other concerns ===
Before the deployment there was controversy about the government's non-resolution of repatriation entitlements and peacekeeper coverage under the Veterans' Entitlements Act, and it had not decided if the deployment would be considered operational service. The pay and allowance issues were resolved; many other conditions-of-service issues were identified, but not resolved. During the deployment few issues were brought to Parliament's attention, although the issue of mail censorship was raised. During the second contingent's rotation, the soldiers' families had a full-time welfare officer tasked with supporting them.

After the deployment, the issues of appropriate service conditions, awards and recognition took many years to resolve. After serving the required 90-day period, contingent members were entitled to the Australian Service Medal (ASM) for non-warlike service. About 12 years after their return to Australia, the government changed the status of the operation; contingent members were eligible for the Returned from Active Service Badge, and their ASMs were upgraded to the Australian Active Service Medal (AASM). After the 2002 decision Major Nigel Catchlove wrote to the Army newspaper, calling it a "pointless upgrade" and saying it "detracts from the award of the AASM to those who truly deserve it". In his letter, Catchlove compared the UNTAG operation to two subsequent operations: the 1st Battalion, Royal Australian Regiment deployment to Somalia during Operation Solace and the deployment of service personnel as part of the International Force for East Timor: "both of those operations involved robust rules of engagement appropriate to the intervention of forces in UN-sanctioned, US or Australian-led multi-national coalitions. UNTAG by way of contrast was a classic peacekeeping operation led by the UN in a relatively benign environment where rules of engagement were focused only on force protection". Catchlove questioned the "half-hearted approach to implementing this appalling decision" in which eligible people must apply for the upgrade, saying this "failed the test of commonsense".

== Timeline of Australian involvement in Namibia ==
A timeline of key dates is presented in the following table:

1979	Australia first placed a contingent of engineers on standby.
August 1988	Notice to deploy re-activated.; Logistic planning re-commenced.
September 1988	1 Australian Service Contingent (1ASC) Headquarters formed at Holsworthy Barracks.
February 1989	14 February – Cabinet endorses Australia's contribution to UNTAG in Namibia.; 19 February – First Australian officer arrives in Windhoek.; 22 to 24 February – Contingent commanders' briefing at UN HQ in New York
March 1989	11 and 14 March – Advance element of the ASC arrives in Namibia by USAF C5A.; 31 March – SWAPO began major cross-border incursion of up to 800 PLAN combatants into Namibia.
April 1989	1 April – Formal cessation of hostilities, restriction to base of South African and SWAPO forces; SRSG and most UNTAG civilian, civilian police and military personnel arrive.; UN Operation Safe Passage requires Australian and British contingents to man border and internal assembly points.; Casualty figures indicate 251 PLAN combatants and 21 members of Security Forces are killed.; 14 April – Main body of Australian contingent arrives in Namibia.
May 1989	Refugees and other returnees begin to return to Namibia.; General rules for elections issued.; Reduction of South African Forces to 12,000; Repeal of discriminatory or restrictive laws completed.; UNHCR assists in return of refugees and other returnees.; UNTAG staff continue monitoring activities.
June 1989	Reduction of South African Forces to 8,000; Release of political prisoners, detainees completed.; All UNTAG activities continue.
July 1989	Further reduction of South African troops to 1,500; Military installations on northern border put under UN supervision or deactivated.; All UNTAG activities continue.; Official start of electoral campaign; Voter registration begins.; Second major contingent of civilian UNTAG staff arrives to support supervision and control of electoral process.
September 1989	Force rotation
October 1989	Electoral campaign continues.; Third major contingent of civilian UNTAG staff, poll watchers (seconded from governments) arrive in Namibia.; 2ASC conducts reconnaissance of UN sites to determine engineering and logistical support likely required during elections.; 2ASC assumes logistical control of deployment of about 1,000 electoral supervisors in Owamboland.
November 1989	1 November – 2ASC establishes a forward command post at Ondangwa Base.; 30 ASC members deploy as military electoral monitors with polling sites along the volatile Angolan border.; 2ASC forms ready-reaction force in Mine-Protected Vehicles (MPV) on standby at Ondangwa Base.; Elections to Constituent Assembly (to draw up and adopt constitution); Completion of withdrawal of remaining 1,500 South African troops; Closure of all bases; Convening of Constituent Assembly of Namibia
February 1990	6 February – Return to Australia of the main force; 11 February – Nelson Mandela released from prison in South Africa.
April 1990	1 April – Conclusion of Constituent Assembly, installation of new government, independence; 9 April – Rear party redeploys to Australia.
