= United Nations Security Council Resolution 640 =

UN Security Council Resolution 640
- Namibia
- Date: 29 August 1989
- Meeting no.: 2,882
- Code: S/RES/640 (Document)
- Subject: Namibia
- Voting summary: 15 voted for; None voted against; None abstained
- Result: Adopted

Security Council composition
- Permanent members: China; France; Soviet Union; United Kingdom; United States
- Non-permanent members: Algeria; Brazil; Canada; Colombia; Ethiopia; Finland; Malaysia; Nepal; Senegal; Yugoslavia

United Nations Security Council resolution 640, adopted unanimously on 29 August 1989, after reaffirming resolutions 431 (1978), 435 (1978), 629 (1989) and 632 (1989), the Council reminded all parties involved in the situation in Namibia implement Resolution 435 of 29 September 1978.

The Council went on to demand the disbandment of paramilitary organisations including the Koevoet and their command structures.

Resolution 640 requested the Secretary-General Javier Pérez de Cuéllar review the situation on the ground with regard to the number of police monitors, the adequacy of the military component of the United Nations Transition Assistance Group, ensuring legislation for the election conforms with the United Nations plan and internationally accepted norms. It also asked him to ensure impartial media coverage of the elections, appealing to all parties concerned to co-operate with him to ensure the full implementation of Resolution 435.

== See also ==
- List of United Nations Security Council Resolutions 601 to 700 (1987–1991)
- South African Border War
- Resolutions 629, 632 and 643
- Apartheid
- South West Africa People's Organization
- United Nations Commissioner for Namibia
