= 1989 Namibian parliamentary election =

- 7–11 November 1989

72 of the 78 seats in the Constituent Assembly 37 seats needed for a majority
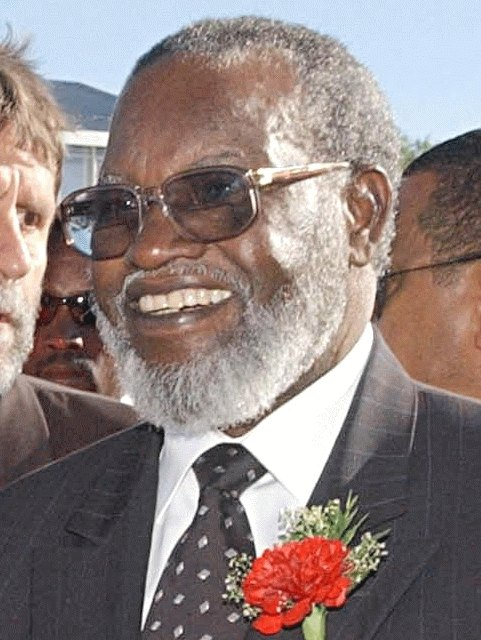

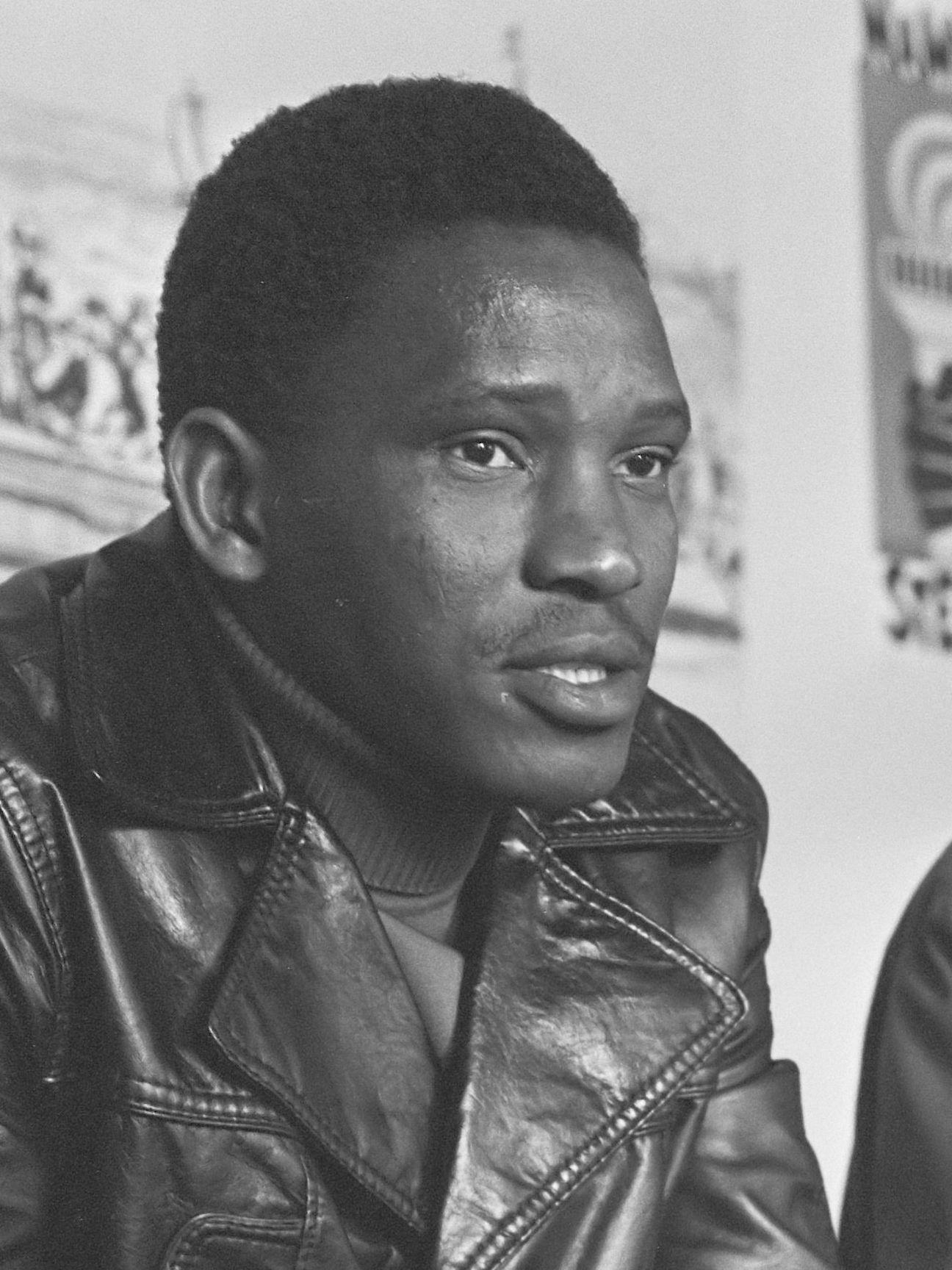

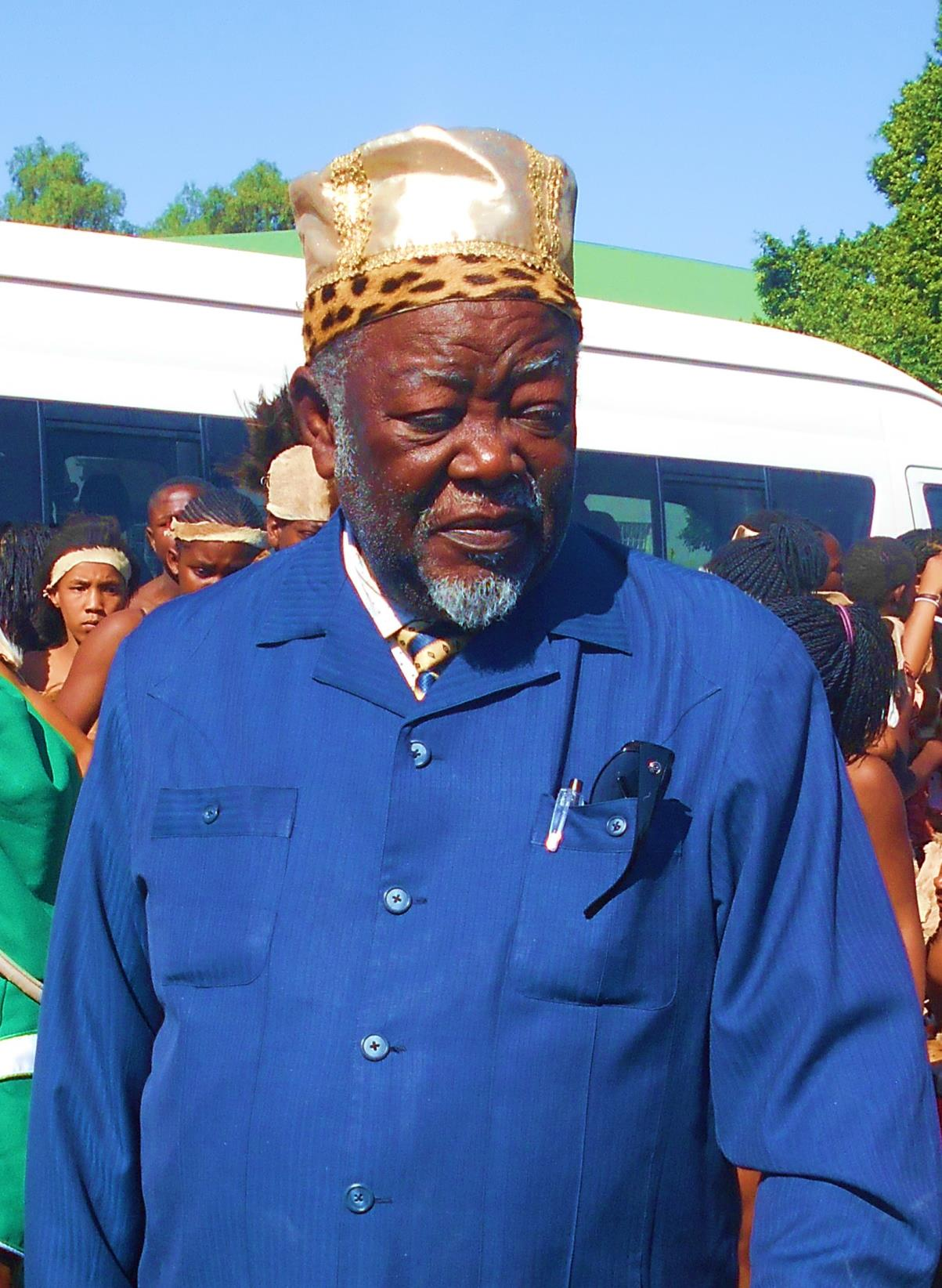
| | First party | Second party | Third party |
|---|---|---|---|
| Leader | Sam Nujoma | Mishake Muyongo | Justus ǁGaroëb |
| Party | SWAPO | DTA | UDF |
| Seats won | 41 | 21 | 4 |
| Popular vote | 384,567 | 191,532 | 37,874 |
| Percentage | 57.33% | 28.55% | 5.65% |
Elected President
Sam Nujoma
SWAPO

Parliamentary elections were held in Namibia between 7 and 11 November 1989. These elections were for the Constituent Assembly of Namibia, which, upon independence in March 1990, became the National Assembly of Namibia.

== Background ==
The elections were facilitated by the United Nations, after the withdrawal of South African troops from South West Africa (present day Namibia) after the 1988 Tripartite Accords. The UN established the United Nations Transition Assistance Group and through its resolutions 629, 632, 640 and 643 in 1989, implemented the United Nations plan for Namibia in resolution 435 (1978) to help secure free and fair elections, and eventually, the country's independence. The United Nations plan included overview by foreign election observers who monitored the election process. The work of foreign observers helped to ensure that the elections were certified as free and fair by the UN Special Representative.

701,483 people registered to vote, with 680,788 casting votes, a voter turnout of 97%.

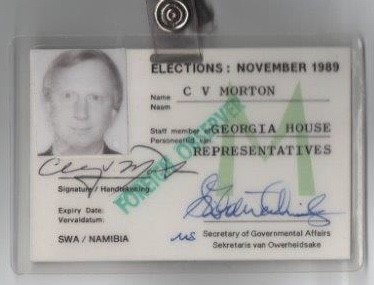
Identification badge of a Foreign Observer issued during the 1989 election - (Chesley V. Morton of the Georgia House of Representatives)

== Results ==
| Party | Votes | % | Seats |
|---|---|---|---|
| SWAPO | 384,567 | 57.33 | 41 |
| Democratic Turnhalle Alliance | 191,532 | 28.55 | 21 |
| United Democratic Front | 37,874 | 5.65 | 4 |
| Action Christian National | 23,728 | 3.54 | 3 |
| National Patriotic Front | 10,693 | 1.59 | 1 |
| Federal Convention of Namibia | 10,452 | 1.56 | 1 |
| Namibia National Front | 5,344 | 0.80 | 1 |
| SWAPO Democrats | 3,161 | 0.47 | 0 |
| Christian Democratic Action for Social Justice | 2,495 | 0.37 | 0 |
| National Democratic Party | 984 | 0.15 | 0 |
| Appointed members | | | 6 |
| Total | 670,830 | 100.00 | 78 |
| Valid votes | 670,830 | 98.54 | |
| Invalid/blank votes | 9,958 | 1.46 | |
| Total votes | 680,788 | 100.00 | |
| Registered voters/turnout | 701,483 | 97.05 | |
Source: African Elections Database

== Aftermath ==
Following the election SWAPO supporters celebrated across Windhoek, especially in the segregated and predominantly black township of Katutura. Dirk Mudge, chairman of the DTA, pledged to work with the SWAPO government in moving towards independence and national development. Support for the DTA and UDF was strong in the former bantustans, including Hereroland and Damaraland.

As a result of SWAPO's election victory, its then president Sam Nujoma was unanimously declared President of Namibia, and was sworn in by UN Secretary-General Javier Pérez de Cuéllar on 21 March 1990. Since then Namibia has held both presidential elections and parliamentary elections every five years.
