= United Nations Security Council Resolution 643 =

UN Security Council Resolution 643
- Namibia
- Date: 31 October 1989
- Meeting no.: 2,886
- Code: S/RES/643 (Document)
- Subject: Namibia
- Voting summary: 15 voted for; None voted against; None abstained
- Result: Adopted

Security Council composition
- Permanent members: China; France; Soviet Union; United Kingdom; United States
- Non-permanent members: Algeria; Brazil; Canada; Colombia; Ethiopia; Finland; Malaysia; Nepal; Senegal; Yugoslavia

United Nations Security Council resolution 643, adopted unanimously on 31 October 1989, after reaffirming resolutions 435 (1978) and 629 (1989), 632 (1989) and 640 (1989), as well as noting a report by the Secretary-General Javier Pérez de Cuéllar, the council expressed its full intention to implement Resolution 435 of 29 September 1978 regarding the situation in Namibia (South West Africa).

The Council went on to reaffirm its legal responsibility over Namibia until its independence, urging all parties to co-operate with the resolution. It also again demanded the disbandment of the Koevoet and the South West Africa Territorial Force, and the replacement of the South African Defence Force in the territory.

The resolution also demanded the repeal of all remaining restrictive and discriminatory laws in Namibia that would inhibit the elections taking place, mandating the Secretary-General to ensure all arrangements are in place, including the support for the Constituent Assembly. It called on Member States and international organisations to provide financial, material and technical support to Namibia.

Adopted by all members of the council, it was the last resolution the council adopted relating to the independence of Namibia.

== See also ==
- List of United Nations Security Council Resolutions 601 to 700 (1987–1991)
- Resolutions 629, 632 and 640
- South African Border War
- South Africa under apartheid
- South West Africa People's Organization
- United Nations Commissioner for Namibia
- United Nations Transition Assistance Group
