= United Nations Security Council Resolution 629 =

UN Security Council Resolution 629
- Namibia
- Date: 16 January 1989
- Meeting no.: 2,842
- Code: S/RES/629 (Document)
- Subject: Namibia
- Voting summary: 15 voted for; None voted against; None abstained
- Result: Adopted

Security Council composition
- Permanent members: China; France; Soviet Union; United Kingdom; United States
- Non-permanent members: Algeria; Brazil; Canada; Colombia; Ethiopia; Finland; Malaysia; Nepal; Senegal; Yugoslavia

United Nations Security Council resolution 629, adopted unanimously on 16 January 1989, after recalling resolutions 431 (1978), 435 (1978) and 628 (1989), the council noted that the parties to the Brazzaville Protocol agreed that 1 April 1989 be established as the date of the South African withdrawal from Angola and therefore lead the way to the independence of Namibia.

The Council emphasised its position to hold free and fair elections under the supervision of the United Nations in Namibia in accordance with Resolution 435 (1978). As a first step, it requested the Secretary-General Javier Pérez de Cuéllar to arrange a formal ceasefire between the South West Africa People's Organization and South Africa, calling upon the latter to substantially reduce its police forces in Namibia with a view to balance the remainder with the monitoring United Nations Transition Assistance Group.

The resolution also asked all parties to impartially implement the resolution, and for the Secretary-General to report back at the earliest possible date on developments since the adoption of the current resolution, and also to investigate cost-saving measures, further asking Member States to consider what assistance they could provide to the newly independent Namibia.

Resolution 629, with the breakdown of the bi-polar system in the council, was drafted by the five permanent members of the Security Council, illustrating a shift in governance which allowed the permanent members to consult informally outside the council chambers on a wide range of issues.

== See also ==
- Internal resistance to apartheid
- List of United Nations Security Council Resolutions 601 to 700 (1987–1991)
- South African Border War
- Resolutions 632, 640 and 643
- Apartheid
- United Nations Commissioner for Namibia
