= Holsworthy Barracks =

Barracks in New South Wales, Australia

- Part of Holsworthy military reserve
- Holsworthy, Sydney, New South Wales in Australia
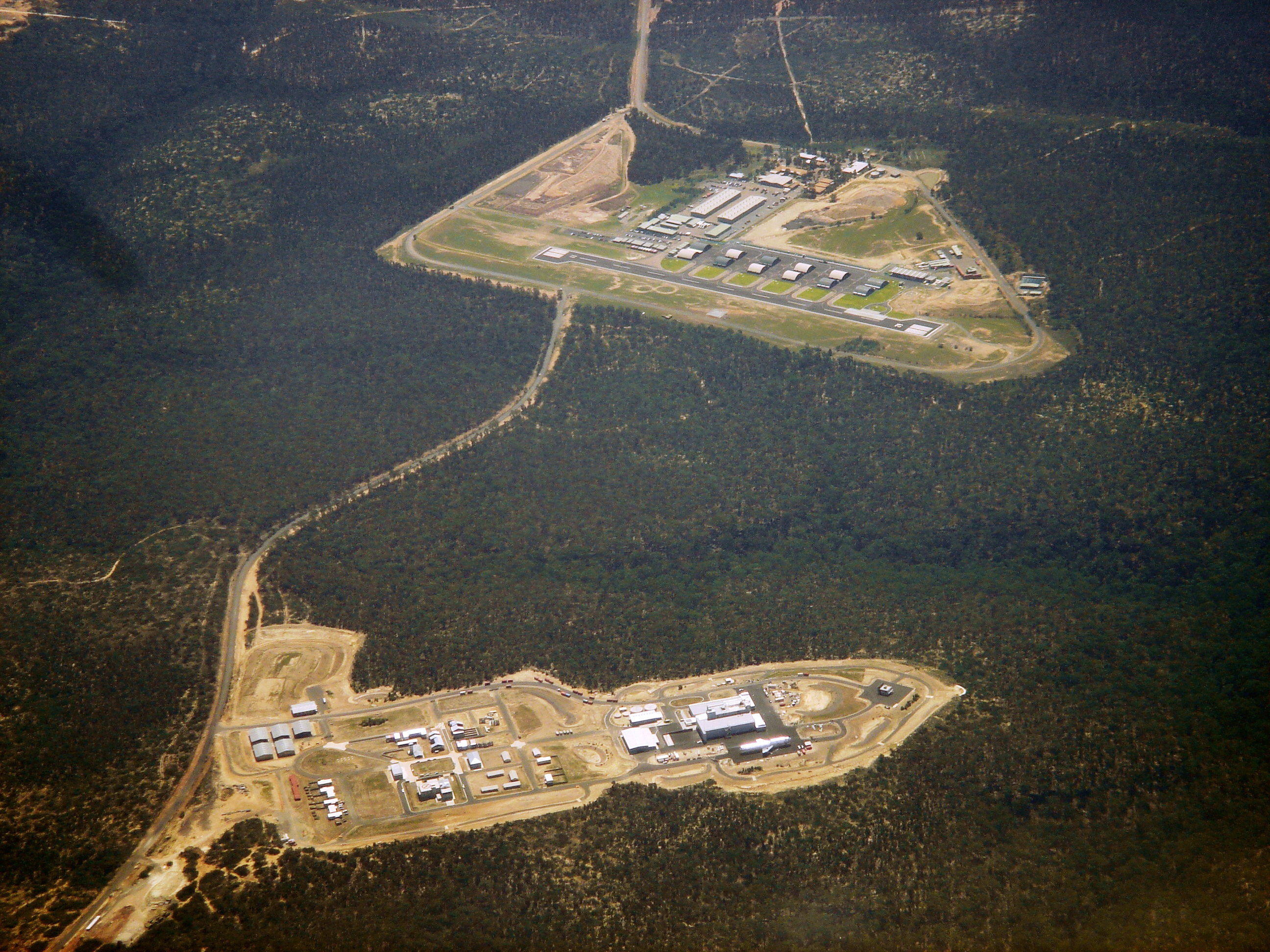
- Aerial view of the barracks' helicopter facilities

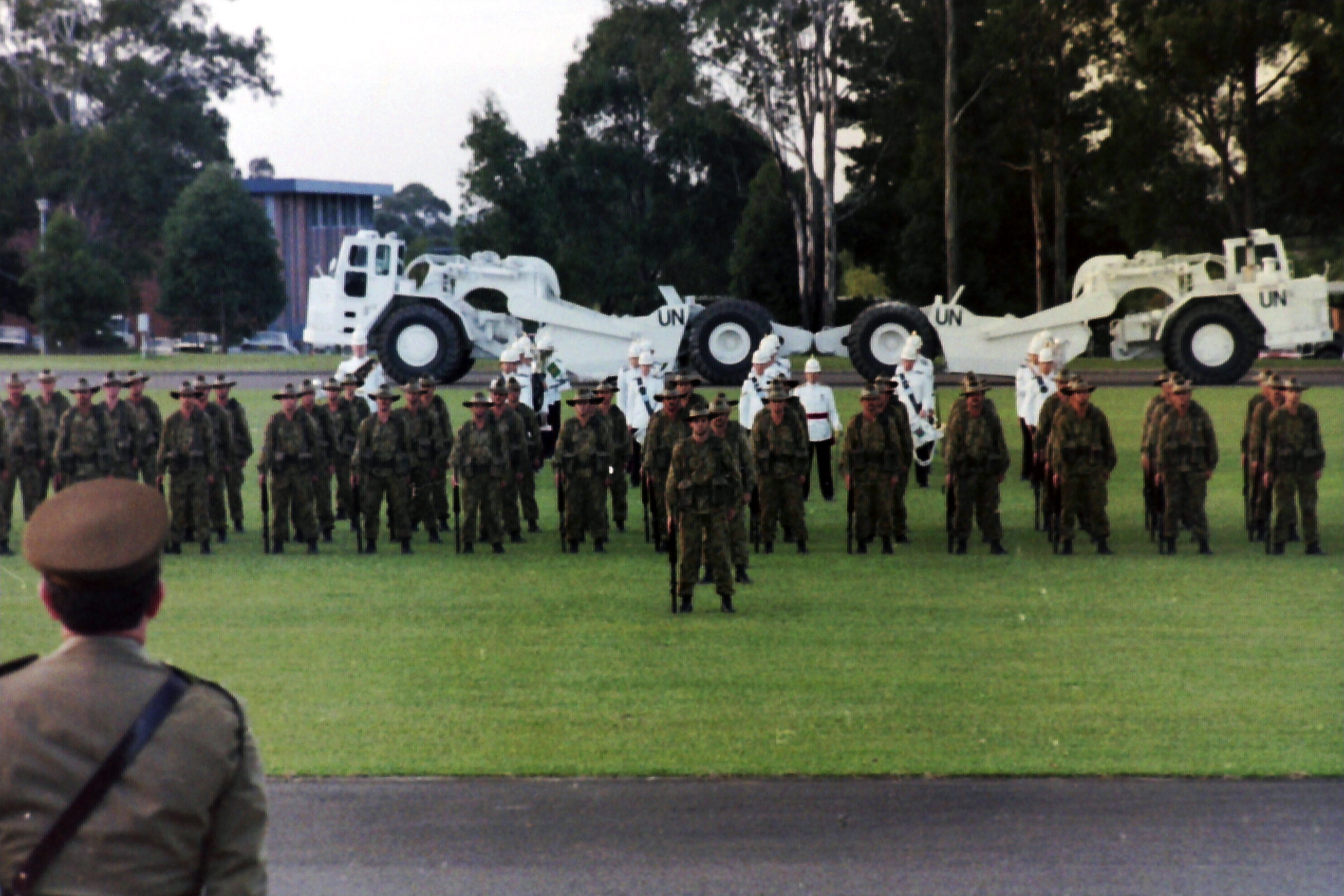
- UNTAG farewell parade at Holsworthy Barracks for the 1 Australian Service Contingent (1ASC), 1989.

Site information
- Type: Barracks
- Owner: Department of Defence
- Operator: Australian Army
- Other site facilities: Defence Force Correctional Establishment

Location
- Location in Greater Sydney
- Coordinates: 33°59′42″S 150°57′06″E
- Area: 22,000 ha (54,000 acres) – (Holsworthy military reserve)

Site history
- Built: 1880s

Garrison information
- Occupants: 145 Signal Squadron; 2nd Commando Regiment; 6th Aviation Regiment; 1st Health Support Battalion

Airfield information
- Identifiers: ICAO: YSHW
- Elevation: 76 m (250 ft) AMSL
Runways
Direction	Length and surface
11/29	670 m (2,198 ft) Asphalt

Holsworthy military base (ICAO: YSHW) is an Australian Army military barracks, located in the Heathcote National Park in Holsworthy approximately 25 km (16 mi) from the central business district, in south-western Sydney, New South Wales, Australia. The barracks is part of the Holsworthy military reserve, which is 22,000 ha (54,000-acre) training area and artillery range for the Australian Army, established in the 1880s and been in active use since World War I. Following World War II, it became a major base for the permanent component of the Australian Army in New South Wales. Holsworthy Military Airport is also located in the reserve. Activities carried out on the base include the use of firing ranges, chemical weapons testing, fire training, vehicle maintenance, and bulk chemical storage and distribution from numerous above ground and underground storage tanks.

Following the movement of many units of the Regular Army to Darwin, Northern Territory, in the late 1990s, many Army Reserve units were moved from other depots to Holsworthy Barracks, including the Headquarters of the 5th Brigade.

The base is currently home to 142 Signal Squadron, 2nd Commando Regiment (2 Cdo Regt), Special Operations Engineer Regiment and 6th Aviation Regiment. A number of training units and the Defence Force Correctional Establishment are also located at Holsworthy.

The base is also home to the regional headquarters of both NSW Australian Army Cadets Brigade and NSW 2nd Australian Army Cadets Brigade.

== Terrorism plot ==
On 4 August 2009, five men from Melbourne, Victoria, were charged over the Holsworthy Barracks terror plot, a plan to storm the barracks with automatic weapons, and shoot anyone they encountered until they themselves were killed or captured. The men were connected with the Somali-based terrorist group al-Shabaab. Prime Minister Kevin Rudd later announced that the federal government had ordered a review of security at all military bases. On 6 August 2009, a Daily Telegraph reporter and photographer were charged with taking a photograph of a defence installation after being granted entry to the military base. In December 2011 three of the terror plotters were sentenced to 18 years in prison.

== See also ==
- List of airports in Greater Sydney
- List of airports in New South Wales
