= Defence Force Correctional Establishment (Australia) =

Military detention facility in New South Wales, Australia

- Location in Greater Sydney
- Location: Holsworthy Barracks, Sydney, Australia; 33°58′18″S 150°55′40″E
- Status: Open
- Capacity: 22 detainees
- Opened: January 17, 1989
- Managed by: Defence Police Training Centre

The Defence Force Correctional Establishment (DFCE) forms the highest tier in the detention system of the Australian Defence Force (ADF). The tri-service facility is used by all the branches of the military. It was established in 1989 and, since 1992, has been located within Holsworthy Barracks in Sydney, New South Wales, Australia.

== Role ==
The DFCE forms the third and highest tier of the ADF's detention system, after unit detention centres and area detention centres. It is the only facility authorised to hold members of the Royal Australian Navy, Australian Army and Royal Australian Air Force who have been sentenced to more than 14 days of detention. It also serves as one of the facilities where personnel under arrest are held while awaiting trial. ADF personnel can be sentenced to up to two years imprisonment at the facility.

The main role of the DFCE is to rehabilitate members of the ADF who have been sentenced to detention for breaching military regulations or laws, though it also seeks to deter such behaviour. An article in the RAAF publication Air Force stated that the DFCE's emphasis on rehabilitation continues "a long Australian [military] tradition of rehabilitation over punishment". A 1998 review of the DFCE stated that it was not a prison, though it has been described as such in a Lawyers Weekly article.

Personnel held at the DFCE are required to participate in a very strict and intensive regime of military training. The goal of this program is to prepare them to return to active service by building respect for military authority and improving the individual's self-respect and discipline. Detainees also undertake charity activities, including supervised projects conducted away from Holsworthy. While at the DFCE, detainees can win the right to minor privileges through good behaviour.

== Facilities and staffing ==
A purpose-built complex for the DFCE was opened in 1992. It included two wings of 13 single-person cells each, with a maximum capacity of 22 people. As of 2002, one cell was being converted into a female shower block, two cells were set-aside for segregated detention and one cell had padded walls. Closed-circuit television is used to monitor detainees.

DFCE detainees have access to a library and classroom, which are used as part of the military training program. The facility also has an outdoors gym which is used for physical training sessions.

The DFCE is staffed by members of the three services, with personnel serving at the facility being designated "instructors" rather than "guards" or similar. As of 2002 staff assigned to the DFCE received four days specialist training before commencing in the role.

== History ==
The DFCE was established on 17 January 1989. It replaced the 1st Military Correctional Establishment, which had existed at Heathcote Road, Hammondville. It was relocated to its current location in 1992, and from 1 July that year reported to Headquarters, Logistics Command. On 16 December 1996 the DFCE was reassigned to Headquarters, Training Command and made part of the Military Police School. Following another reorganisation, it became part of the Military Police Training Centre from 1 December 1997. As of 2013, the DFCE formed part of the Defence Police Training Centre.

In 1997 it was reported that 55 ADF personnel had been subjected to abusive treatment during "Attitude Adjustment Training" which took place during familiarisation visits to the DFCE from 1993 onwards. This practice ceased following the reports on 31 July 1997 and in March 1998 the Minister for Defence ordered that an inquiry be conducted into the allegations. The inquiry found that "Attitude Adjustment Training" had been lawful and recommended that the practice be resumed under a different name once "strict procedures and controls" were put in place.

In October 2013 the DFCE received a Newfoundland dog to serve as both a mascot and a rehabilitation animal for detainees. At this time, it was intended that the dog would be the first in a line of Newfoundlands to perform these roles. This dog is affectionately named 'Charlie' and although elderly, is in good health as of 2020. Charlie continues to reside at DFCE to date and is allocated a specifically trained handler to care for her.

The number of detainees and the time they spend at the DFCE varies considerably. As of 2002 the average period of detention was 14–16 days, with 270 days being the longest up to that time. In 2013 the average sentence served by detainees at the DFCE was 23 days, though the number of personnel held in the facility had decreased from 69 during 2010 to 45 in 2011 and 42 in 2012.
