= Dewan Prem Chand =

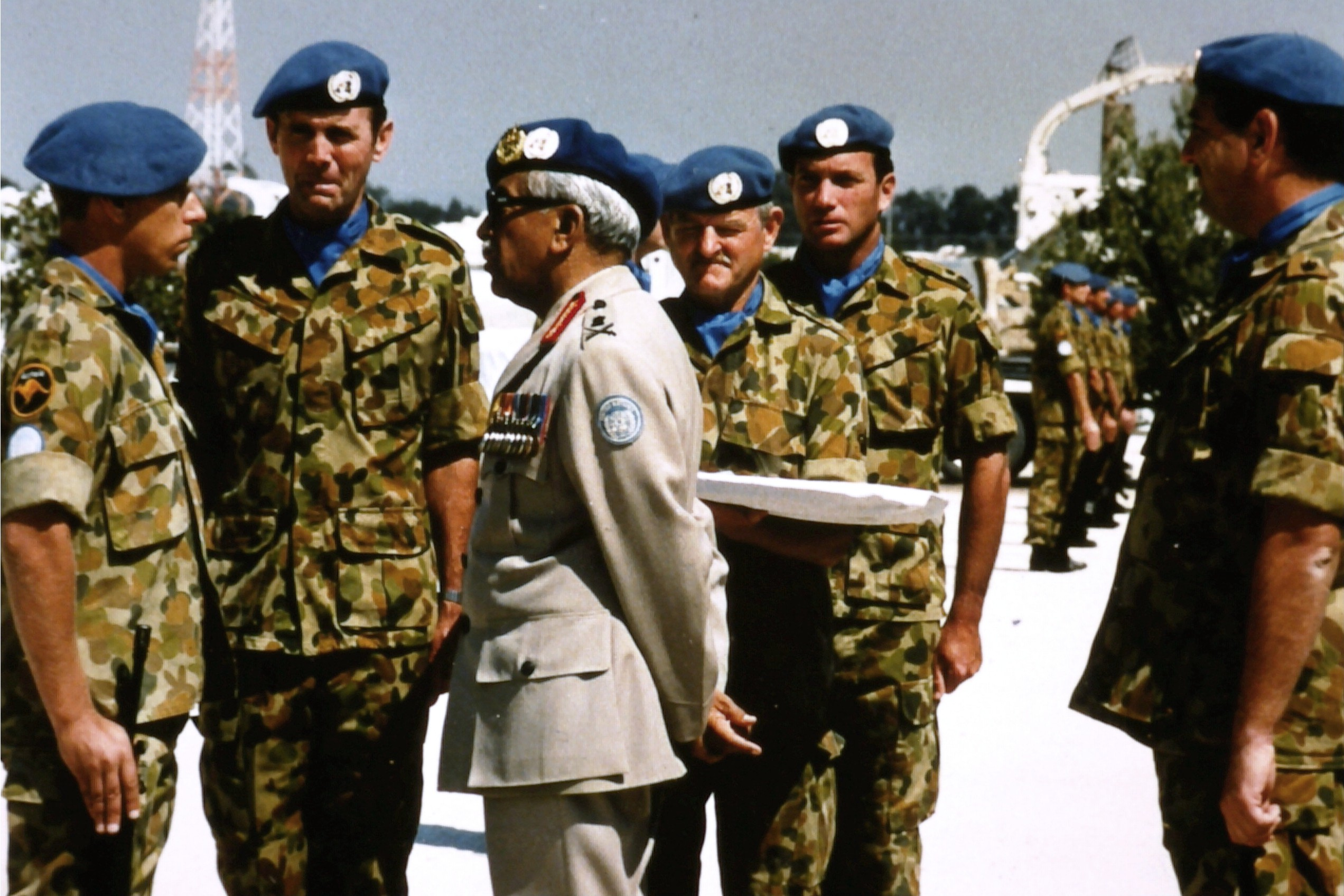
- Lieutenant General Chand presenting medals to members of the Australian Service Contingent of UNTAG in Suiderhof, Windhoek, in 1989.
- Born: 14 June 1916; Muzaffargarh, Punjab Province, British India (now Pakistan)
- Died: 3 November 2003 (aged 87); New Delhi, India
- Military career
- Allegiance: India
- Branch: British Indian Army (1934–47); Indian Army (1947–90)
- Service years: 1934–1976; 1989–1990
- Rank: Lieutenant General
- Commands: United Nations Transition Assistance Group (1989–1990); United Nations Peacekeeping Force in Cyprus (1969–1976)
- Conflicts: Second World War
- Awards: Param Vishisht Seva Medal

Lieutenant General Dewan Prem Chand, PVSM (14 June 1916 – 3 November 2003) was an Indian Army officer. He served as Force Commander of United Nations peacekeeping missions in the Democratic Republic of the Congo, Cyprus, Namibia and Zimbabwe.

== Early life ==
Dewan Prem Chand was born on 14 June 1916 in Muzaffargarh, British India, to Dewan Khem Chand and his wife, members of a wealthy Punjabi dewan family. After an initial education at the Bishop Cotton School in Shimla, he studied at the Government College University in Lahore. In late 1934 Chand enrolled in the Indian Military Academy in Dehradun, where he performed well academically. While on holiday in Srinagar, Chand and some of his fellow cadets attempted to go swimming in one of the local lakes, which was marked with signs reading "No Indians Allowed" and "Europeans Only", only to be turned away by white boatmen. The following day they rode shikaras into the lake. When the boatmen attempted to stop them, the cadets boarded their craft and threw them into the water. Other boaters converged and fought with the cadets until an elderly man intervened. Chand and his comrades left after removing the segregationist signs and extracting an assurance that they could swim in the lake.

Chand was commissioned into the British Indian Army in 1937. He was attached to the 1st Battalion, Dorset Regiment on 24 February 1938. He was accepted for the Indian Army and posted to the 5th Battalion, 10th Baluch Regiment on 24 February 1939. His seniority as second lieutenant was antedated to 31 January 1937 and he was promoted lieutenant 30 April 1939. He served during the Second World War.

== Service with the United Nations ==
Chand commanded United Nations forces during two of their most sensitive peacekeeping operations.

=== Katanga in the Congo (1962) ===
Chand commanded troops in the United Nations Operation in the Congo in the breakaway Republic of the Congo (Léopoldville) province of Katanga in 1962 during the Congo Crisis. He was awarded the Param Vishisht Seva Medal for distinguished service during this operation.

=== Cyprus (1970–76) ===
"In this sad time Prem showed just why
We all have praised him to the sky.
Courageous, wise and serene and good,
Night and day he did all he could.
Without him and his splendid Force
The Shambles would have been far worse
War victims knew a helping hand
Was always certain from Prem Chand."

— Extract from Urquhart's poem, December 1976

Chand commanded United Nations forces on the divided island of Cyprus from 1970 to 1976. He was responsible for organising the escape of Makarios III from Cyprus during the 1974 coup that overthrew him. The same year, he protected Nicosia International Airport from the Turkish invasion of Cyprus. The UN remained in control of the airport. In December 1976 UN Under-Secretary-General Brian Urquhart wrote a poem in his farewell message to Chand to commemorate his service with UN peacekeeping.

=== Rhodesia (1977) ===
In 1977, Chand ended retirement to act as the UN secretary general's personal observer in Rhodesia, when discussions began to end Ian Smith's unilateral declaration of independence.

=== Namibia (1989–1990) ===
In 1989 the UN created the United Nations Transition Assistance Group to oversee the withdrawal of South African forces from Namibia and ensure free elections. At the behest of the members funding most of the mission, the original 7,500 troops envisaged in the initial deployment was cut down to 4,650. Prem Chand was appointed commander of the operation, but expressed concerns that the reduced force would be unable to fulfill its duties. Nevertheless, the cost-cutting measures prevailed. Chand arrived in Windhoek in late February with an advance group of peacekeepers.

== Death and legacy ==
Chand died in New Delhi on 3 November 2003 at the age of 87.

== Dates of rank ==
Insignia	Rank	Component	Date of rank
	Second Lieutenant	British Indian Army	1 February 1938 (seniority from 31 January 1937)
	Lieutenant	British Indian Army	24 February 1939
	Captain	British Indian Army	24 November 1941 (acting); 24 January 1942 (temporary); 30 November 1942 (war-substantive); 31 January 1945 (substantive)
	Major	British Indian Army	31 August 1942 (acting); 30 November 1942 (temporary)
	Captain	Indian Army	15 August 1947 (Note: Upon independence in 1947, India became a Dominion within the British Commonwealth of Nations. As a result, the rank insignia of the British Army, incorporating the Tudor Crown and four-pointed Bath Star ("pip"), was retained, as George VI remained Commander-in-Chief of the Indian Armed Forces. After 26 January 1950, when India became a republic, the President of India became Commander-in-Chief, and the Ashoka Lion replaced the crown, with a five-pointed star being substituted for the "pip.")
	Major	Indian Army	26 January 1950 (recommissioning and change in insignia)
	Lieutenant Colonel	Indian Army	31 January 1951 (substantive)
	Colonel	Indian Army	31 January 1955 (substantive)
	Brigadier	Indian Army	3 October 1952 (acting); 31 January 1960 (substantive)
	Major General	Indian Army	10 March 1962 (substantive)
	Lieutenant General	Indian Army	1970
