= United Nations Security Council Resolution 632 =

UN Security Council Resolution 632
- Namibia
- Date: 16 February 1989
- Meeting no.: 2,848
- Code: S/RES/632 (Document)
- Subject: Namibia
- Voting summary: 15 voted for; None voted against; None abstained
- Result: Adopted

Security Council composition
- Permanent members: China; France; Soviet Union; United Kingdom; United States
- Non-permanent members: Algeria; Brazil; Canada; Colombia; Ethiopia; Finland; Malaysia; Nepal; Senegal; Yugoslavia

United Nations Security Council resolution 632, adopted unanimously on 16 February 1989, after reaffirming resolutions 431 (1978), 435 (1978) and 629 (1989), the Council endorsed a report by the Secretary-General Javier Pérez de Cuéllar concerning the United Nations plan for Namibia, reiterating its legal authority over the territory until its independence.

The Council stated it would implement Resolution 435 (1978) in its original form to allow free and fair elections in Namibia without intimidation. It also expressed its full support to the Secretary-General and his efforts in the region, requesting him to keep the Council updated and calling on all parties to honour their commitments to the United Nations plan.

In supporting the Secretary-General's report, Resolution 632 therefore fixed the number of personnel as part of the United Nations Transition Assistance Group at 4,650.

== See also ==
- List of United Nations Security Council Resolutions 601 to 700 (1987–1991)
- South African Border War
- Resolutions 629, 640 and 643
- Apartheid
- South West Africa People's Organization
- United Nations Commissioner for Namibia
