= United Nations Security Council Resolution 264 =

UN Security Council Resolution 264
- Date: March 20, 1969
- Meeting no.: 1,465
- Code: S/RES/263 (Document)
- Subject: The Situation in Namibia
- Voting summary: 13 voted for; None voted against; 2 abstained
- Result: Adopted

Security Council composition
- Permanent members: China; France; Soviet Union; United Kingdom; United States
- Non-permanent members: Algeria; Colombia; Finland; Hungary; Nepal; Pakistan; Paraguay; Senegal; Spain; Zambia

United Nations Security Council Resolution 264 was adopted on March 20, 1969, after a General Assembly resolution terminated the mandate of South West Africa (Namibia).

In accordance with UNSC Resolution 264, the UN assumed direct responsibility for the territory and declared the continued presence of South Africa in Namibia as illegal, calling upon the Government of South Africa to withdraw immediately.

The Security Council condemned the refusal of South Africa to comply with previous resolutions, declaring that South Africa had no right to enact the South West Africa Affairs Bill and that South African actions were designed to destroy the national unity and territorial integrity of Namibia through the establishment of Bantustans. The Council decided that, in the event of the Government of South Africa's failure to comply with the provisions of the present resolution, it would meet immediately to determine the necessary measures to be taken. It gave the United Nations Secretary-General the responsibility of following up on the implementation of the resolution, and reporting back to the Security Council.

The resolution passed with 13 votes in favour; France and the United Kingdom abstained.

== See also ==
- List of United Nations Security Council Resolutions 201 to 300 (1965–1971)
- United Nations Commissioner for Namibia
- United Nations Security Council Resolution 435
