= United Nations Transition Assistance Group =

1989–1990 peacekeeping mission in Namibia

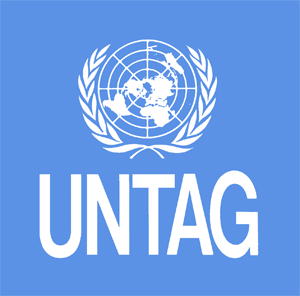
- Abbreviation: UNTAG
- Type: Peacekeeping Mission
- Legal status: Completed
- Special Representative: Martti Ahtisaari
- Parent organization: UN Security Council
- Website: https://peacekeeping.un.org/sites/default/files/past/untag.htm

The United Nations Transition Assistance Group (UNTAG) was a United Nations (UN) peacekeeping force deployed from April 1989 to March 1990 in Namibia, known at the time as South West Africa, to monitor the peace process and elections there. Namibia had been occupied by South Africa since 1915, first under a League of Nations mandate and later illegally. Since 1966, South African forces had been combating an insurgency by the People's Liberation Army of Namibia (PLAN), the military wing of the Namibian-nationalist South West African People's Organization (SWAPO). The UN Security Council passed Resolution 435 in 1978, which set out a plan for elections administered by South Africa but under UN supervision and control after a ceasefire. However, only in 1988 were the two parties able to agree to a ceasefire. As UNTAG began to deploy peacekeepers, military observers, police, and political workers, hostilities were briefly renewed on the day the transition process was supposed to begin. After a new round of negotiations, a second date was set and the elections process began in earnest. Elections for the constitutional assembly took place in November 1989. They were peaceful and declared free and fair; SWAPO won a majority of the seats. The new constitution was adopted four months later and it was followed by Namibia's official independence and the successful conclusion of UNTAG.

== Background ==
=== South African rule ===
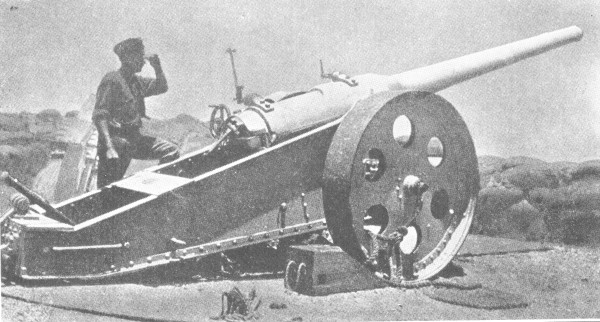
A British 4.7-inch artillery piece as used in Southwest Africa in 1916

During World War I, South Africa occupied German South West Africa, present-day Namibia. After the war, South Africa was granted the League of Nations Mandate to administer the territory of South West Africa as a colony. South Africa ran the country as if it were simply another province, granting it political representation in the South African Parliament (though under discriminatory apartheid restrictions), and integrating it economically into the country. Though there was talk of official union, the government never officially acted to annex the territory.

After World War II, when the United Nations superseded the League of Nations, South Africa refused to accept a UN Trusteeship over South West Africa and simultaneously declared the League Mandate void, as the League no longer existed. The International Court of Justice (ICJ) declared that though South Africa had no legal obligation to accept the trusteeship, it also had no legal right to void the Mandate.

=== Fighting begins ===
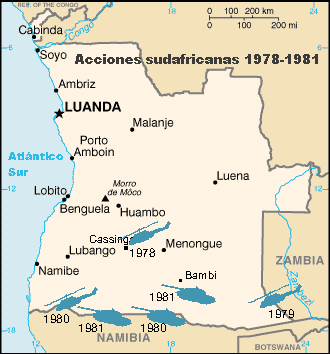
Map of South African Defence Force incursions into Angola, 1978–1981

In 1966, the UN General Assembly revoked South Africa's Mandate and declared South West Africa to be under UN administration until it could gain independence. Also in 1966, SWAPO, which had become the preeminent nationalist organization in Namibia in the early 1960s, begin to launch guerrilla attacks from Zambia with its military wing, known as the People's Liberation Army of Namibia (PLAN). The first skirmish between PLAN and the South African Defence Force (SADF) in what became known as the Namibian War of Independence took place on 26 August 1966 at Omugulugwombashe. Over the next few years, there followed a series of General Assembly resolutions concerning the territory including one, in 1968 renaming it Namibia, and many others condemning the South African occupation and calling for elections. The UN Security Council endorsed the actions of the General Assembly in United Nations Security Council Resolution 264 of 1969. Meanwhile, South Africa went about creating its own regime in Namibia, without free elections or international participation.

In 1975, Angola, Namibia's northern neighbour, gained its independence from Portugal and a coalition government took over there. However, the coalition quickly broke down and the Angolan Civil War began. The United States and South Africa supported one group, the National Union for the Total independence of Angola (UNITA), the Soviet Union backed the People's Movement for the Liberation of Angola (MPLA), and the People's Republic of China supported the National Liberation Front of Angola (FNLA). The MPLA occupied the capital and the economically crucial oil fields with the help of Cuban troops and was soon recognized as the legitimate government by many countries, although UNITA and FNLA united and continued to control large swaths of the country. The MPLA allowed SWAPO to establish bases on Angolan soil from which to launch attacks on the SADF and other targets.

=== UN response ===
On 30 January 1976 the Security Council adopted Resolution 385 which declared that it was imperative to hold free elections under UN supervision and control for the whole of Namibia as one political entity. Because South Africa did not initially accept the plan, the five Western members of the Security Council (the Contact Group) held a series of talks with the "Frontline States", SWAPO, South Africa and the UN Commissioner for Namibia, Martti Ahtisaari, until a "proposal for a settlement of the Namibian situation" was eventually agreed between the negotiators and presented to the Security Council on 10 April 1978.

== Foundation ==
=== Settlement proposal ===
The settlement proposal contained a negotiated compromise. Described as a "working arrangement" which would "in no way constitute recognition of the legality of the South African presence in and administration of Namibia", it allowed South Africa, through an Administrator-General designated by it, to administer elections, but under United Nations supervision and control exercised through a Special Representative of the Secretary-General, who would be assisted by a "United Nations Transition Assistance Group" (UNTAG). Later in 1978, the UN Security Council approved a resolution with a specific, timetabled plan for SADF withdrawal and Namibian elections and authorized UNTAG, with a combined military and civilian force, to facilitate the transition to independence. The plan depended on an agreement on a so-called "D-Day" for the beginning of the ceasefire. However, by that point, South Africa had been drawn into the conflict in Angola in an attempt to crack down on the SWAPO insurgency and made a new demand: the so-called "linkage" of the withdrawal of Cuban troops from Angola and their withdrawal from Namibia. Other issues, such as the composition of the UNTAG forces and the status of Namibia's important port Walvis Bay also kept the parties from reaching an agreement on a ceasefire date.

Talks stagnated during the following decade as the civil war in Angola continued. It was not until 1988 that Cuba, Angola, and South Africa came to an agreement, called the "Tripartite Accord" or the "New York Accords", mediated by US Assistant Secretary of State Chester Crocker. A series of meetings starting in London and culminating in Geneva resulted in a ceasefire agreement, set to begin on 8 August 1988. A final meeting in Brazzaville, Congo, set 1 April 1989 as "D-Day" when the implementation of United Nations Security Council Resolution 435 would begin. The New York Accords between Cuba, Angola and South Africa were formally signed at UN headquarters in New York City on 22 December 1988, officially ending the South African Border War though the ceasefire collapsed in Angola several months later.

=== Approval ===
The Security Council expressed concern about the cost of implementing the resolution, as the UN had been suffering from a severe financial crisis in the late 1980s. However, several groups, including the Organization of African Unity (OAU), the Non-Aligned Movement, and SWAPO objected to a reduction in the size of the force from the number set in 1978. As a compromise, United Nations Secretary General, Javier Pérez de Cuéllar, decided to decrease the initial deployment from 7000 to 4650, leaving the additional 2350 stationed in their home countries to be deployed if requested by the commanding officer and approved by the head of UNTAG, the Secretary-General, and the Security Council. In place of these soldiers extra police observers and military observers were added to the mission.

Finally, on 9 February 1989, the Secretary-General presented the Security Council with a resolution along with a statement of urgency, saying that everything must be done quickly if all the plans in Resolution 435 were to be carried out on schedule. The Security Council approved the mission on 16 February 1989 in United Nations Security Council Resolution 632. The General Assembly, however, did not approve the budget for the mission until 1 March 1989 and, due to continuing financial problems, even then the UN did not have reserve funds to begin making requests to member states. Full deployment of UNTAG was delayed by nearly a full month.

== Mandate ==
The UNTAG mandate under Resolution 435 was primarily to create an environment suitable for free and fair elections for a constituent assembly to draft a constitution for the nation. The entire mission was under the control of the Special Representative, Martti Ahtisaari. The military component was commanded by Lieutenant-General Dewan Prem Chand of India. UNTAG was based in Windhoek, Namibia's capital and largest city.

=== Civilian ===
The civilian component of the mission had a number of parts as follows:

- Office of the Special Representative of the Secretary-General (SRSG), Martti Ahtisaari. Their role was to provide support to the SRSG, and provide the political connection with the UN in New York. Martti Ahtisaari's UNTAG office oversaw all aspects of the mission and was specifically in charge of the diplomatic negotiations with Namibian political and military leaders, including the South African Administrator-General (AG), Louis Pienaar. (27 personnel)
- Director of Administration. To ensure compliance with UN policy in areas such as financial accountability, logistic procedures and personnel policy. (354 personnel)
- Civil Police Monitors (CIVPOL). The civilian police formed the largest part of the civilian component of UNTAG, with 1500 personnel. These police were used both to monitor the actions of the existing police and security forces to prevent electoral intimidation or human rights violations as well as to assist with the establishment and maintenance of law and order. 25 member states contributed police officers to the force, which was led by Steven Fanning of Ireland. (1000 personnel)
- Electoral Unit. This branch of UNTAG was charged with planning, facilitating, and monitoring the elections. This group had to register and inform voters and candidates of procedures in a country with no democratic tradition, as well as provide for the secure transport and counting of ballots. Nearly 30 countries volunteered election monitors for polling stations and ballot counting. To educate the Namibian people in the electoral process and to oversee the conduct of the election by the South African Administrator General. (990 personnel)
- United Nations High Commissioner for Refugees. The UN High Commissioner for Refugees (UNHCR) was charged with monitoring and assisting the return of refugees from war-torn areas, as well as political exiles, and insurgents based in foreign countries. It both assisted in ensuring access to the country and with resettlement and reintegration into Namibian society prior to the elections. UNTAG also provided and independent jurist to adjudicate the cases of detainees, political prisoners, and forced exiles. Carl Nörgaard of Denmark was appointed to this position in 1978 and fulfilled its duties when opportunity finally presented itself in 1989. (49 personnel)
- Independent Jurors. To support the SRSG in the assessment and free and fair certification of the elections. (4 personnel)

=== Military ===
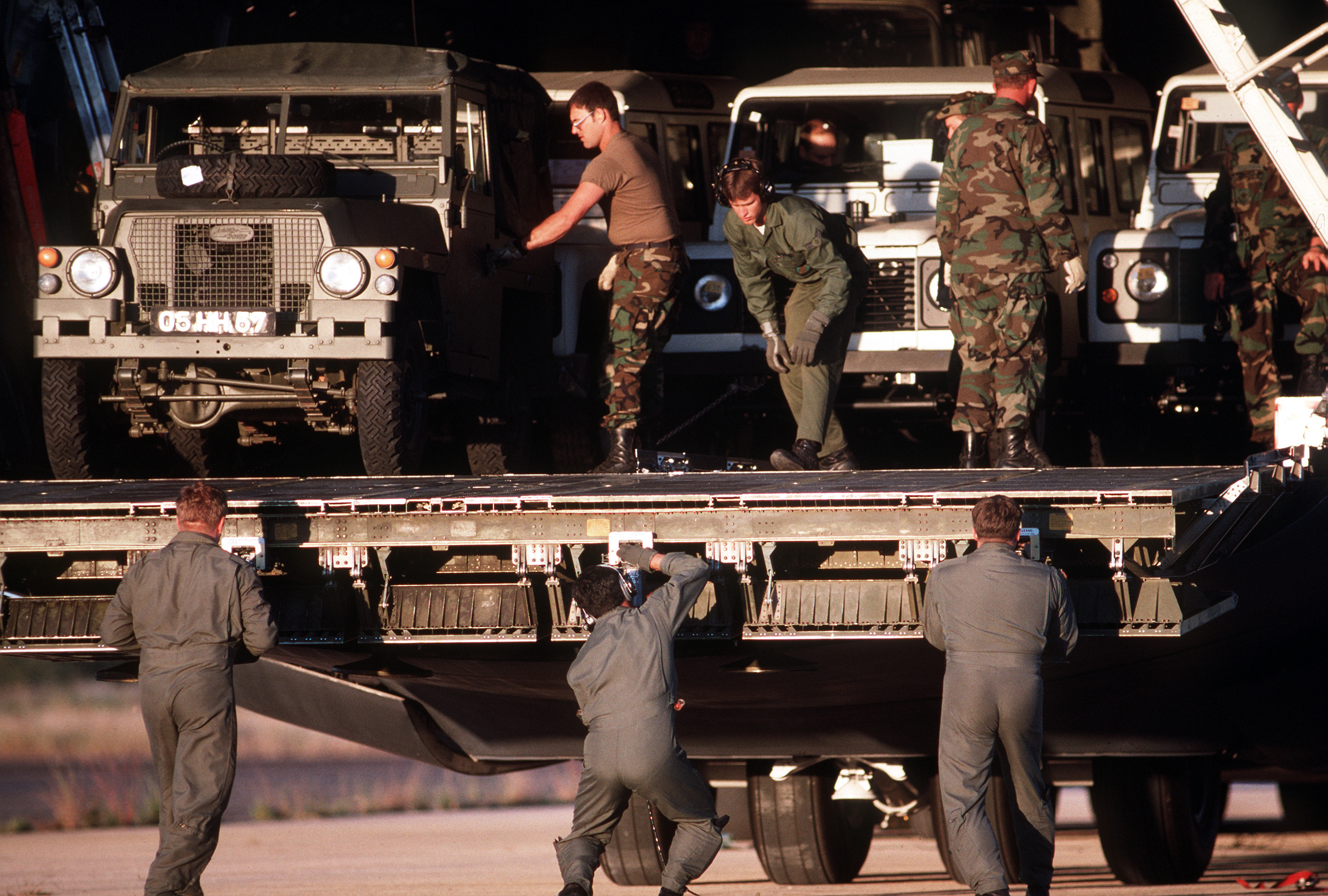
Crew unload Land Rovers in Grootfontein for use by Finnish UNTAG troops

The military component (MILCOM) was responsible for monitoring the ceasefire, disarming SWAPO militants, overseeing the withdrawal of the SADF, and controlling the borders.

The force was organised as follows:

- UNTAG Force Headquarters. Troops were drawn from 28 countries and the staffing of the Force Commander's Headquarters reflected the various contingent nationalities. This is a normal practice in UN military missions with senior military staff positions being filled according to national commitments. For example, as a consequence of providing infantry battalions Kenya, Malaysia and Finland provided officers to fill the positions of Deputy Commander, Chief of Staff and Chief of Operations respectively. Poland provided a Chief of Logistics, Czechoslovakia a Chief Military Monitor, Canada a Deputy Chief of Logistics and Australia a Chief Engineer. The implications of lack of common staff procedures are self-evident and caused numerous delays in establishing a functional Headquarters.
- An infantry brigade composed of three enlarged infantry battalions contributed from Finland, Kenya, and Malaysia. Four reserve battalions stationed in their home countries from Bangladesh, Togo, Venezuela and Yugoslavia were identified but not deployed.
- Specialist Group Component (consisted of a Polish Logistic Battalion which provided third line logistic support, a joint military/civilian medical unit based on a Swiss Medical Unit, Danish Movement Control, Danish Postal Unit, Australian Engineer Squadron, Canadian Logistic Unit provided second line logistic support until it was withdrawn, and Support Group Depot and a Signals Squadron from the United Kingdom.
- Military Police Company Monitors from 14 member states.
- Air Support Group Monitors (consisted of a Headquarters Squadron, Tactical Utility Transport Squadron, Heavy Tactical Transport Flight, Medium Transport Helicopter Flight and a Utility Transport Helicopter Squadron) from Italy, and Spain.
- The Soviet Union and the United States also provided transport for the initial deployment of the military forces.

=== Contributors of Military and Uniformed Personnel ===
The following countries provided troops, military observers, civilian police and military headquarters personnel to this Mission:

	Country	Contribution	References
1	Algeria	Civilian Police	
2	Australia	309 Engineers, Engineer HQ, Military Police, 30 Electoral Supervisors	
3	Austria	50 Civilian Police	
4	Bangladesh	25 Military Observers, 60 Civilian Police	
5	Barbados	Civilian Police	(Note: First time participant in UN Peacekeeping Mission)
6	Belgium	Civilian Police	
7	Canada	255 logistic troops, 100 Civilian Police, Electoral Supervisors	
8	China	Electoral Supervisors, 20 Administration staff	
9	Congo	Electoral Supervisors	
10	Costa Rica	Electoral Supervisors	
11	Côte d'Ivoire	Civilian Police	
12	Czechoslovakia	20 Military Observers	
13	Denmark	Administrative Company, Movement Control, Postal, Electoral Supervisors	
14	Egypt	Civilian Police	
15	Federal Republic of Germany	Civilian Police, Electoral Supervisors	
16	Fiji	Civilian Police	
17	Finland	Infantry Battalion, Military Observers, Electoral Supervisors	
18	France	Electoral Supervisors	
19	German Democratic Republic	Civilian Police, Electoral Supervisors	
20	Ghana	Civilian Police, Electoral Supervisors	
21	Greece	Electoral Supervisors	
22	Guyana	Civilian Police	
23	Hungary	Civilian Police	
24	India	Civilian Police, Military Observers, Electoral Supervisors	
25	Indonesia	Civilian Police	
26	Ireland	Civilian Police, Military Observers	
27	Italy	Helicopter Squadron	
28	Jamaica	Civilian Police	
29	Japan	Electoral Supervisors	
30	Kenya	Deputy Commander, Infantry Battalion, Military Observers, Electoral Supervisors	
31	Malaysia	Royal Malay Regiment Infantry Battalions, Combat Engineers (including Explosive Unit), Military Observers	
32	Mexico	Military Observers	
33	Morocco	Military Observers	
34	Netherlands	Civilian Police	
35	New Zealand	15 Military Engineers, 32 Civilian Police	
36	Nigeria	Civilian Police, Electoral Supervisors	
37	Norway	Civilian Police, Electoral Supervisors	
38	Pakistan	20 Military Observers, 136 Civilian Police, 40 Electoral Observers	
39	Panama	Military Observers	
40	Peru	Military Observers	
41	Philippines	Military Observers	
42	Poland	Logistic Battalion, Military Observers, Electoral Supervisors	
43	Portugal	Electoral Supervisors	
44	Senegal	Civilian Police	
45	Singapore	Civilian Police, Electoral Supervisors	
46	Soviet Union	Air transport, Electoral Supervisors	
47	Spain	Squadron of Light Transport Aircraft	
48	Sudan	Military Observers	
49	Sweden	Civilian Police, Electoral Supervisors	
50	Switzerland	Medical Unit, Electoral Supervisors	
51	Thailand	Electoral Supervisors	
52	Togo	Military Observers	
53	Trinidad and Tobago	Electoral Supervisors	
54	Tunisia	Civilian Police	
55	United Kingdom	Signals Squadron, Electoral Supervisors	
56	United States of America	Air transport	
57	Yugoslavia	Military Observers	

== Implementation ==
=== D-Day setback ===
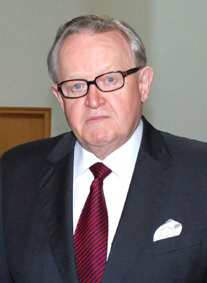
Martti Ahtisaari in 2007

On 1 April 1989—"D-Day" for the peace plan—UNTAG was still not fully deployed and the units that were deployed, mostly civilians and monitors, lacked equipment for both transportation and communication. Despite this, hopes were high, as the informal ceasefire had held for nearly seven months. However, in the early morning, SADF reported that heavily armed groups of PLAN fighters had begun crossing the border and establishing positions in northern Namibia in violations of the agreement that they should be confined to their Angolan bases. SWAPO initially denied that it had violated the terms of the agreement, and claimed that its fighters had been going to turn in weapons to UNTAG and had been attacked by the SADF.

UNTAG's head, Martti Ahtisaari, came under pressure from British prime minister, Margaret Thatcher, who was visiting Southern Africa at the time, and from South African foreign minister, Pik Botha, to allow SADF forces to leave their bases and repel the SWAPO incursions. Ahtisaari quickly decided to allow a limited deployment. He would later describe this decision as his most difficult: "We were in a restraining business, not releasing troops but trying to restrain them. Otherwise, the entire South African military might have gone after the Namibian guerrillas, and I think they might have gone into Angola. By limiting South African retaliation to half a dozen army battalions and police units, the transition process was ultimately saved."

A period of intense fighting followed resulting in the deaths of at least 263 guerrillas and 27 South Africans. Tense and rushed negotiations at Mount Etjo, a safari lodge in central Namibia, ended with a recommitment from both sides to the peace process and the leader of SWAPO, Sam Nujoma, calling for all SWAPO fighters to return to their bases in Angola. However, the SADF maintained positions very close to UNTAG collection points for SWAPO fighters and most therefore refused to approach and rejected UNTAG escorts. Clashes continued between SADF troops and SWAPO forces claiming to be returning to Angola. A new agreement was reached on 20 April 1989 when SADF forces withdrew to base for 60 hours, allowing SWAPO forces to withdraw peacefully. The SADF then had two weeks to confirm that SWAPO had indeed left Namibia and also to capture any weapons caches discovered.

The renewed fighting and Ahtisaari's decision to allow South African forces out of their barracks, caused a backlash, particularly among African nations. In response, the UN increased the number of police and appointed Joseph Legwaila of Botswana to be Mr. Ahtisaari's Deputy. After the Etjo agreement, the withdrawal and verification passed without incident and by the end UNTAG was almost fully deployed, albeit a month behind schedule.

=== Ceasefire reestablished ===
Despite the delay caused by the fighting of early April, the withdrawal of South African military personnel continued on schedule, with troops confined to base by 13 May and reduced to the agreed-upon 1500 by 24 June 1989. UNTAG also confirmed a second disarmament of sizable militia, primarily the 22,000 strong South West African Territorial Force and the 11,000 local "citizen forces". These were made up of South African-paid and controlled militia, who had been disarmed and disbanded before 1 April, but were called up again to fight in the early April clashes. By 1 June, they had been demobilized once again.

UNTAG was also charged with monitoring the SWAPO forces based in southern Angola and, despite numerous charges, mostly from the South Africans, that they were massing at the border or violating the border agreements, these allegations were denied by UNTAG.

After the restriction of the SADF to base, the South West African Police (SWAPOL) were the only South African controlled force in Namibia and also the main forces maintaining law and order in the province. The UNTAG police forces were hard pressed to monitor all of the police forces, which were not always perfectly cooperative. There were numerous reports of police misbehavior, though they decreased over the course of the UNTAG deployment. Former members of the Koevoet, a paramilitary counter-insurgency group that was disbanded in 1989 and incorporated into SWAPOL, proved to be the most problematic. According to the UN report, for the first several months, the former Koevoet units travelled heavily armed and were often reported to have behaved violently and engaged in intimidation, just as they had during the insurgency.

As these reports came in, UNTAG began negotiations with AG Pienaar and the South African Government, demanding that all South African forces in Namibia be lightly armed and that the former Koevoet forces and command structures be done away with, since most of the Koevoet personnel were not trained as police. South Africa claimed, however, that the massing of SWAPO forces at the border demanded the former Koevoet forces. These forces were finally disbanded 1 September 1989, several weeks before the election.

=== Election preparations ===
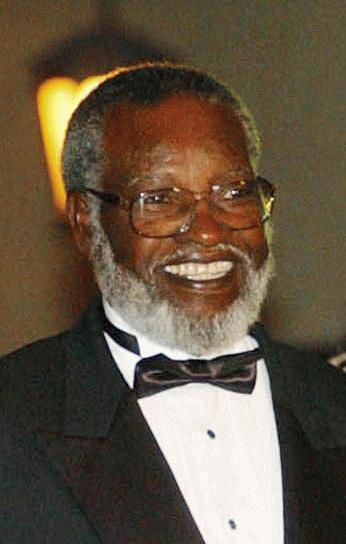
Sam Nujoma, the leader of SWAPO, was elected Namibia's first president

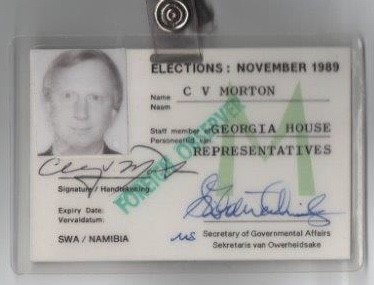
Identification badge of a Foreign Observer issued during the 1989 election

The ultimate goal of the mission was to organize free and fair elections for a Constituent Assembly which would write a constitution for the nation. In preparation, a number of legal changes were demanded. On 12 June, AG Pienaar proclaimed a general amnesty for Namibians living abroad, and repealed or amended 56 discriminatory laws. He also authorised the release of political prisoners and captured combatants, who were resettled under UNTAG's supervision. SWAPO was also required to release captured members of South African security forces. Both SWAPO and South Africa claimed that the other side continued to hold prisoners, accusations repeatedly denied by each. Alleged detention locations were searched by UNTAG personnel and the lists of missing persons were examined and eventually reduced to just over 300 unaccounted for individuals. Refugees were also assisted after the amnesty. Many were airlifted into the country, registered, and given aid. The repatriation and resettlement of refugees was one of the most widely celebrated and successful functions of UNTAG, while the conflict over the release of prisoners was one of the most difficult.

After rejecting the election law proposed by AG Pienaar as seriously flawed, UNTAG officials with the input of the leaders of the political parties drew up rules for political parties defining their role in the new democracy in Namibia. The UN Secretary-General also made a trip to Namibia, meeting with the political leaders encouraging national unity. UNTAG members and the political parties met with political leaders at all levels, to ensure that intimidation, vote buying, and other irregularities were not encouraged and to communicate that they would not be tolerated by the election observers or the party leaders. The Group also sponsored television, radio, and print media in a number of local languages aimed at educating the people about their rights and responsibilities in the upcoming election and in democracy.

UNTAG was also responsible for registering voters all over the vast and sparsely populated country. 70 registration centers were set up along with 110 mobile registration teams for the more remote areas. All Namibians over 18 were eligible to vote and registration exceeded expectations, illustrating enthusiasm across the country for the elections. UNTAG also registered ten political parties for the election. Over 350 polling stations were set up across the country and personnel from the police, military, civilian elements of UNTAG were set on election monitoring duty, along with hundreds of extra election specialists contributed from more than 25 member states.

In the months leading up to the elections, complaints came from several quarters, including SWAPO, the US, NGOs, and UNTAG itself, of police intimidation practices and even preparation for vote rigging.

Voting took place over a five-day period from 7–11 November. Voting went smoothly with reports of intimidation decreasing as the election approached and no violence reported during the election. Voters stood in lines up to half a mile long in some places to vote, but in the end participation of 97% was reported with only slightly more than 1% of ballots being declared invalid. The election was declared free and fair by all the international observer groups present and the UN Special Representative, Martti Ahtisaari.

== Results ==
SWAPO won the elections with 57% of the votes, short of the two-thirds majority needed to control the constitutional process entirely. A Constituent Assembly based on the results of the election met to consider a draft Constitution, which was adopted on 9 February 1990. The Assembly determined that 21 March 1990 would be Namibia's independence day.

After the elections, AG Pienaar continued his role alongside UN Special Representative Ahtisaari and UNTAG. One of Pienaar's final acts was to amend the amnesty against future prosecution granted to Namibian exiles in June 1989 to cover anyone, including South African officials, militia, and the SADF for crimes committed in during the war.

In the months after the election, UNTAG forces were slowly drawn down and the final SADF forces were withdrawn. By the independence day, all UNTAG forces had been left with the exception of some Kenyan troops who remained to train the new Namibian Army under an independent agreement. Several UN diplomatic personnel also stayed to assist the newly independent state.

UNTAG was considered very successful by the UN and its member states. Namibia became a democracy, without the racial segregation seen under the apartheid system. The security problems had decreased during the UNTAG deployment and the elections had gone off better than expected. Despite tensions, after the elections, the Namibian and South African governments had established formal diplomatic relations. Furthermore, worries about costs were proven unfounded as UNTAG was well under the original budget of US$700 million, and even well under the reduced budget passed by the Security Council of US$416 million, costing less than US$368.6 million. There were 19 fatalities to UN personnel in just over a year.

== See also ==
- History of Namibia: Struggle for Independence
- Angolan Civil War
- Australian contribution to UNTAG
