= United Nations Security Council Resolution 435 =

UN Security Council Resolution 435
- Location of Namibia
- Date: 29 September 1978
- Meeting no.: 2,087
- Code: S/RES/435 (Document)
- Subject: Namibia
- Voting summary: 12 voted for; None voted against; 2 abstained
- Result: Adopted

Security Council composition
- Permanent members: China; France; Soviet Union; United Kingdom; United States
- Non-permanent members: Bolivia; Canada; Czechoslovakia; Gabon; India; Kuwait; Mauritius; Nigeria; Venezuela; West Germany

United Nations Security Council Resolution 435, adopted on September 29, 1978, put forward proposals for a cease-fire and UN-supervised elections in South African-controlled South West Africa which ultimately led to the independence of Namibia. Importantly, it established the United Nations Transition Assistance Group (UNTAG) which oversaw the election and the South African withdrawal.

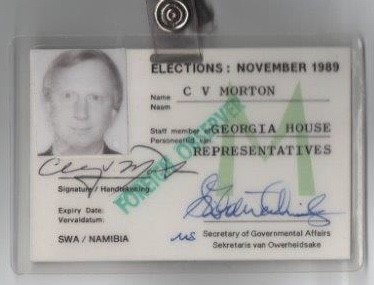
International Election Observer identification badge issued during the 1989 Namibian election

The resolution was adopted by 12 votes to none; Czechoslovakia and the Soviet Union abstained while the People's Republic of China did not participate in the vote.

On December 22, 1988, South Africa agreed to implement the resolution upon its signature of the Tripartite Accord at the United Nations in New York. The Accord concluded an agreement on the independence for Namibia, and the withdrawal of Cuban troops from Angola, and was signed by Angola, Cuba and South Africa.

== See also ==
- Angolan Civil War
- History of Namibia
- List of United Nations Security Council Resolutions 401 to 500 (1976–1982)
- South African Border War
- United Nations Commissioner for Namibia
- United Nations Security Council Resolution 264
