= Benoît Batraville =

Haitian resistance fighter (1877–1920)

- Born: Benoît Batraville; 1877; Mirebalais
- Died: 20 May 1920 (aged 42–43)
- Other name: Ti-Benwa
- Occupation: Revolutionary

Benoît Batraville, nicknamed "Ti-Benwa" (1877 – 1920), was a Haitian teacher and resistance fighter against the American occupation, executed by the US Marines.

== Biography ==
Benoît Batraville was born in Mirebalais in 1877. He was a descendant of Joseph Benoît Batraville, comrade-in-arms of Jean-Jacques Dessalines. Benoît Batraville would become a nationalist opponent of the American occupation. Unlike Charlemagne Peralte, his superior, Benoît Batraville came from a modest family. However, through his family ties with the "Peraltes", he had access to the highest circles of the ruling elite. After general studies, he became a schoolteacher. Haitian historian Roger Gaillard attributes these characteristics to him: "of average height and musculature, reddish complexion, straight hair, brown and peaceful eyes, always correct in dress and behavior. He does not frequent the betting parlors, nor the gaming rooms, nor the drinking establishments". A practicing vodouisant, like other Caco chiefs, he often wore a red badge symbolizing Ogoun, warrior god of Vodou.

== Guerrilla resistance ==
After the death of Charlemagne, many cacos laid down their arms as fear set in. On December 2, 1919, in Cabaret, several Cacos generals met to appoint Batraville as the new leader. He decided to transfer the center of the resistance to the far south of the country in order to attack the capital Port-au-Prince. His methods were described by contemporaries as being notably more aggressive and ruthless.

On January 15, 1920, Batraville was at the head of a band of cacos entering the Bel-Air neighborhood of Port-au-Prince. At least three hundred were killed or captured by the gendarmerie. A new campaign by the marines apprehended about 3,200 others.

In April 1920, American Lieutenant Colonel Lawrence Muth led a patrol against the Cacos, however Muth’s patrol was ambushed and he was mortally wounded. Subsequently, according to the testimony of an imprisoned cacos, Batraville cut off Muth’s head. Lieutenant Colonel Hooker adds that "they cut off his private parts, removed his heart and liver, opened his stomach, then his intestines and took two large strips of flesh from his thighs [...] his heart and liver were eaten". The ambush of Muth is considered the last victorious action of Batraville's soldiers.

== Death ==
May 20, 1920, at Barrière Roche, near Lascahobas, Benoit Batraville was killed after local peasants were interrogated into revealing his refuge. He was subsequently buried in the cemetery of Mirebalais, putting an end to the Cacos resistance.
