= Gendarmerie of Haiti =

- Gendarmerie d'Haïti
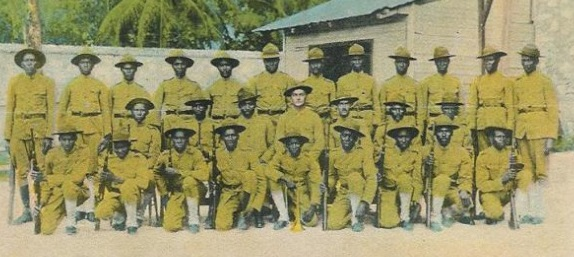
- Members of the Gendarmerie of Haiti in 1920
- Active: 1915–1928
- Country: Haiti
- Allegiance: United States
- Type: Gendarmerie
- Role: Internal security
- Size: 3,322 (1927)
- Engagements: Second Caco War

Commanders
- Notable commanders: Smedley Butler

The Gendarmerie of Haiti (French: Gendarmerie d'Haïti), also known as the Haitian Constabulary, was a Haitian gendarmerie raised during the United States occupation of Haiti. Established in 1915 under U.S. military guidance, the gendarmerie was operational from 1916 until 1928, during which time it was Haiti's only military force, earning a reputation for active interference in civilian government that may have set the stage for the future politicization of the Armed Forces of Haiti. From 1918 to 1920, the gendarmerie fought in the Second Caco War. It was reorganized as the Haitian Guard in 1928, forming the nucleus of what would evolve into the modern military of Haiti.

== Early history ==
=== Formation ===
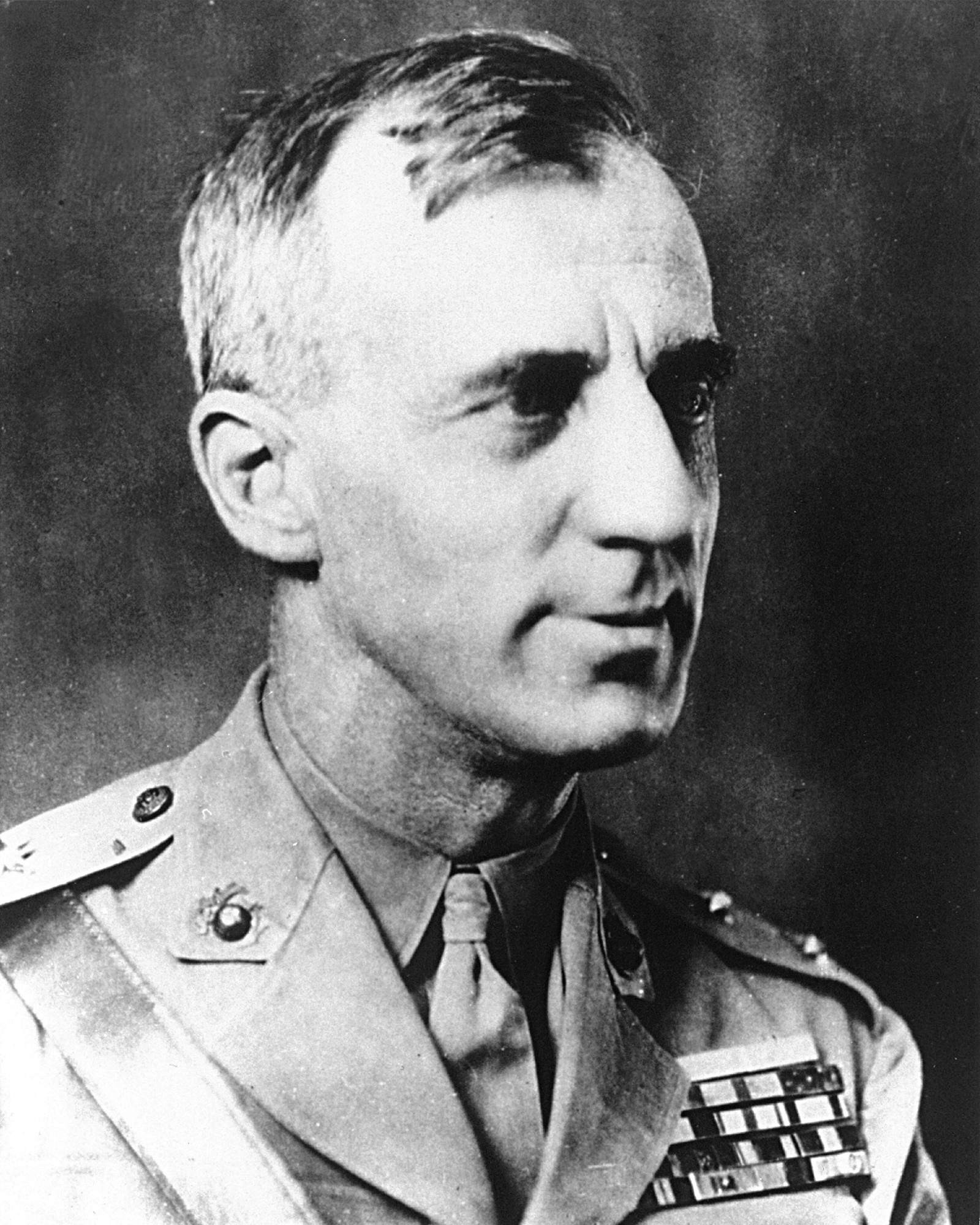
Smedley Butler, shown here wearing U.S. Marine Corps uniform in later life, was Haiti's first commandant of gendarmerie.

A United States occupation of Haiti began on July 28, 1915. It began after a Haitian mob attacked the French legation in Port-au-Prince and seized President Vilbrun Guillaume Sam, who had fled into the legation due to popular unrest. The mob killed Sam and "mutilated his body in the street". Admiral William Banks Caperton, leading the initial landing force, declared martial law and ordered the Haitian army dissolved. In the absence of functioning police, U.S. Marines assumed civilian law enforcement duties, but occupation authorities had already set into motion plans to raise a local police force with the Haitian–American Convention, obligating Haiti's American-established interim government to "create without delay an efficient constabulary, urban and rural."

The Gendarmerie of Haiti was formally established in December 1915. It became operational in February of the following year, with Smedley Butler (then a Marine Corps major) assuming the post of commandant of gendarmes and the Haitian rank of major general. Officers, non-commissioned officers, and enlisted personnel of the U.S. Navy and Marine Corps were initially placed in command of the force, holding officer commissions from the Haitian government while retaining their United States commissions and enlistment status. The process for commissioning of officers was set out in the Haitian–American Convention:

All American officers of the gendarmerie shall be appointed by the President of Haiti upon nomination by the President of the United States, and will be replaced by Haitians when they have shown by examination ... that they are fit for command.

Early attempts to establish an officer candidate school to train an indigenous officer corps from among Haiti's educated upper class failed due to a reluctance among potential candidates to be seen collaborating with the American occupation, and by the perception that the methods of American military instruction were demeaning. Enlisted gendarmes, meanwhile, were recruited from indigenous Haitians who were paid between $10 and $25 per month.

The gendarmerie was equipped initially with the Krag–Jørgensen bolt-action rifle. Uniforms were surplus Marine Corps uniforms with plain buttons in lieu of buttons embossed with the Marine Corps Eagle, Globe, and Anchor.

=== Expanding role ===
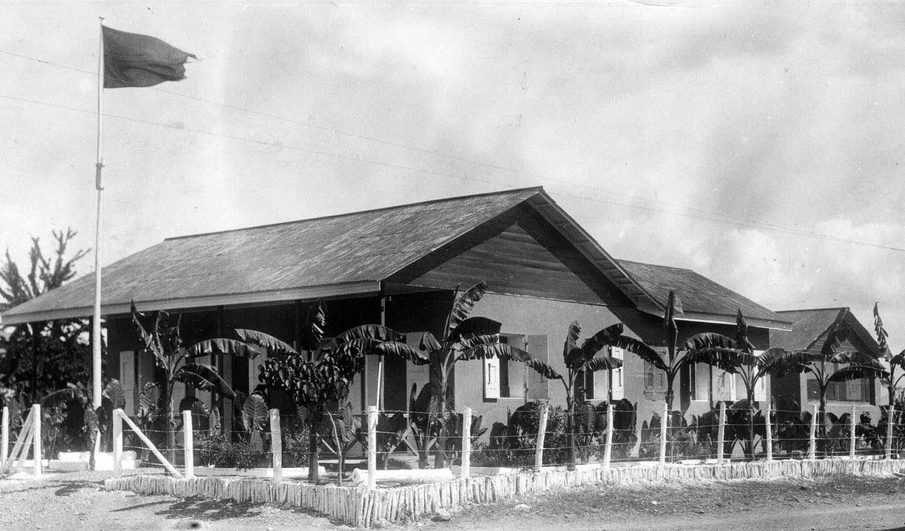
Gendarmerie sub-district headquarters at Gros-Morne, Artibonite, pictured in the 1920s

The gendarmerie quickly evolved into the cornerstone of the United States occupation, and gendarmerie officers had practical control over the U.S. client government of Philippe Sudré Dartiguenave; one visiting American observer noted that: "the actual running of the government comes pretty near being vested in General Butler and his young colonels and majors." On one occasion, the Haitian ambassador to the United States balked at the idea of signing a Butler-inspired compact that would give the gendarmerie control of the nation's postal service. Butler forced the issue by placing an armed guard in President Dartiguenave's office, with instructions to compel Dartiguenave to telegraph the ambassador with orders to sign the agreement "or else".

Even at the local level, junior officers were virtual "potentates", having not only military and police authority in their jurisdictions, but also being responsible to sit as judges in civil and criminal cases, to collect taxes, to manage prisons, to enforce weights and measures, to register vital statistics, and to audit the financial records of municipal governments. Interference by gendarmerie officers into local governmental affairs prompted Solon Ménos, the Haitian ambassador to the United States, to file a complaint with the U.S. State Department, observing that: "the American officers of the Haitian gendarmerie ... have extended their powers for the communal councils to such an extent that they wish to act as administrators of the commune and not rest within their powers."

== Second Caco War ==
=== Conflict ===
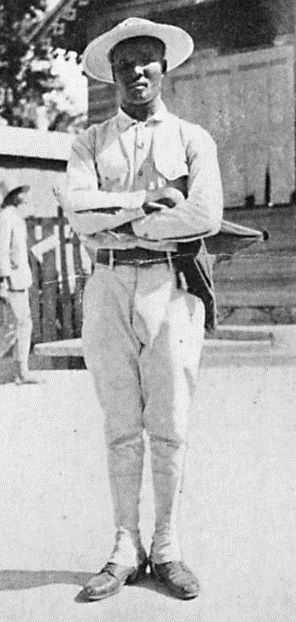
A Haitian gendarme photographed by Harry A. Franck in 1920

Some gendarmerie actions, including the enforcement of government press censorship, and the use of conscripted civilian labor for infrastructure development, have been cited as factors leading to the Second Caco War (1918–20), a rebellion by Haitians against the occupation.

The conflict erupted on October 17, 1918, with an attack by 100 rebel cacos on a gendarmerie barracks. The assault was repulsed with significant loss of life, and commanding officer Lieutenant Patrick Kelly earned Haiti's Médaille militaire and a promotion to captain for his role in the defense of the barracks. A wave of small-scale rebel attacks on isolated gendarmerie outposts followed; over a six-month period in 1919, the gendarmerie reported more than 130 engagements with cacos.

The 1919 Battle of Port-au-Prince saw the first major action between gendarmes and rebels, and after-action dispatches reported the force acquitted itself well. The day following the Battle of Port-au-Prince, a contingent of 12 gendarmes under Lt. Kemp C. Christian overran the cacos' base camp, killing 30 rebels and capturing their only field gun. Nonetheless, during this period, the gendarmerie was largely dependent on the U.S. Marine Corps to provide the "muscle" for its operations, though by the end of the rebellion gendarmerie units were beginning to operate independently. By 1919 an experimental gendamerie unit had been raised under the designation "Provisional Company A". Unlike the bulk of gendarmerie units, which garrisoned towns, Provisional Company A was a mobile force organized to conduct preventative patrols. Chesty Puller, then a gendarmerie officer, was given the captaincy of Provisional Company A. The company's executive officer, Lt. Augustin Brunot, was one of the first indigenous Haitians to receive a commission.

By the time the Second Caco War ended in 1920, 75 gendarmes had been killed in action.

=== Aftermath ===
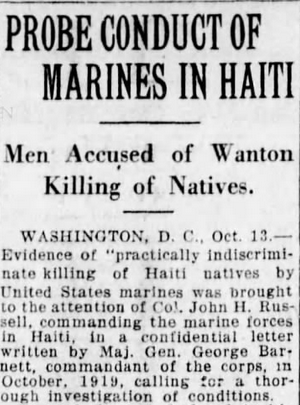
A headline in the Des Moines Register from 1920 announces the planned probe of U.S. Marine Corps and Haitian Gendarmerie activity during the Second Caco War.

Following the war, the U.S. Senate's Select Committee on Haiti and Santo Domingo convened a series of hearings to investigate the behavior of gendarmes and marines during the conflict. Several indigenous Haitian gendarmes who were asked to submit testimony to the hearing alleged that gendarmerie officers had executed prisoners. One gendarme, Eucher Jean, stated that:

... during the first part of the month of November 1918, while I was a first sergeant in the Gendarmerie d'Haïti, serving in the district of Hinche, Haiti, I saw Lieut. Freeman Lang, Gendarmerie d'Haïti, take a Haitian who was prisoner, named Teka, out of the prison in the town of Hinche, and purposely execute him with a machine-gun rifle.

Despite the sometimes gruesome testimony it was generally believed the hearings were politically motivated and that individual excesses could largely be traced only to Lang and Dorcas Williams, both of whom had been acting under the orders of a Marine Corps officer who had since been committed to an insane asylum. Both of the accused gendarmerie officers had been indicted by U.S. Navy court-martial prior to the hearings. A separate inquiry conducted by the Haitian government concluded that, outside of 10 killings attributed to Lang and Williams, the gendarmerie's conduct of the war had been justifiable.

== 1924 Olympics ==
Haiti was represented at the 1924 Olympics by a rifle team composed entirely of black gendarmes. The team won the bronze medal in the team free rifle event, which was the nation's first-ever Olympic medal. The team's expenses were paid for from all of the nation's gendarmes contributing five percent of their salary for five months.

== Later history and influence ==
In 1927, the gendarmerie was reporting a strength of 160 officers, 2,522 gendarmes and 551 rural policemen. Even at this late date only about 40 of the officers were Haitian, the majority being United States Marines and sailors.

In 1928, the gendarmerie was reorganized as the Garde d'Haïti and became the nucleus of what would eventually evolve into the reconstituted Haitian army. The later politicization of the Haitian military has been attributed by some to Haiti's early experience with the Gendarmerie d'Haïti. The gendarmerie's special access to U.S. resources and influence vested in it a measure of social control within Haiti that would become institutionalized in later years. On the other hand, former Haitian President Prosper Avril has observed that Haiti already had a long tradition of military involvement in government prior to the occupation, with 25 of its 26 pre-occupation presidents being either military officers or leaders of rebel groups. Avril also contends the gendarmerie worked to instill a respect for political neutrality in its men.

== Chain of command ==
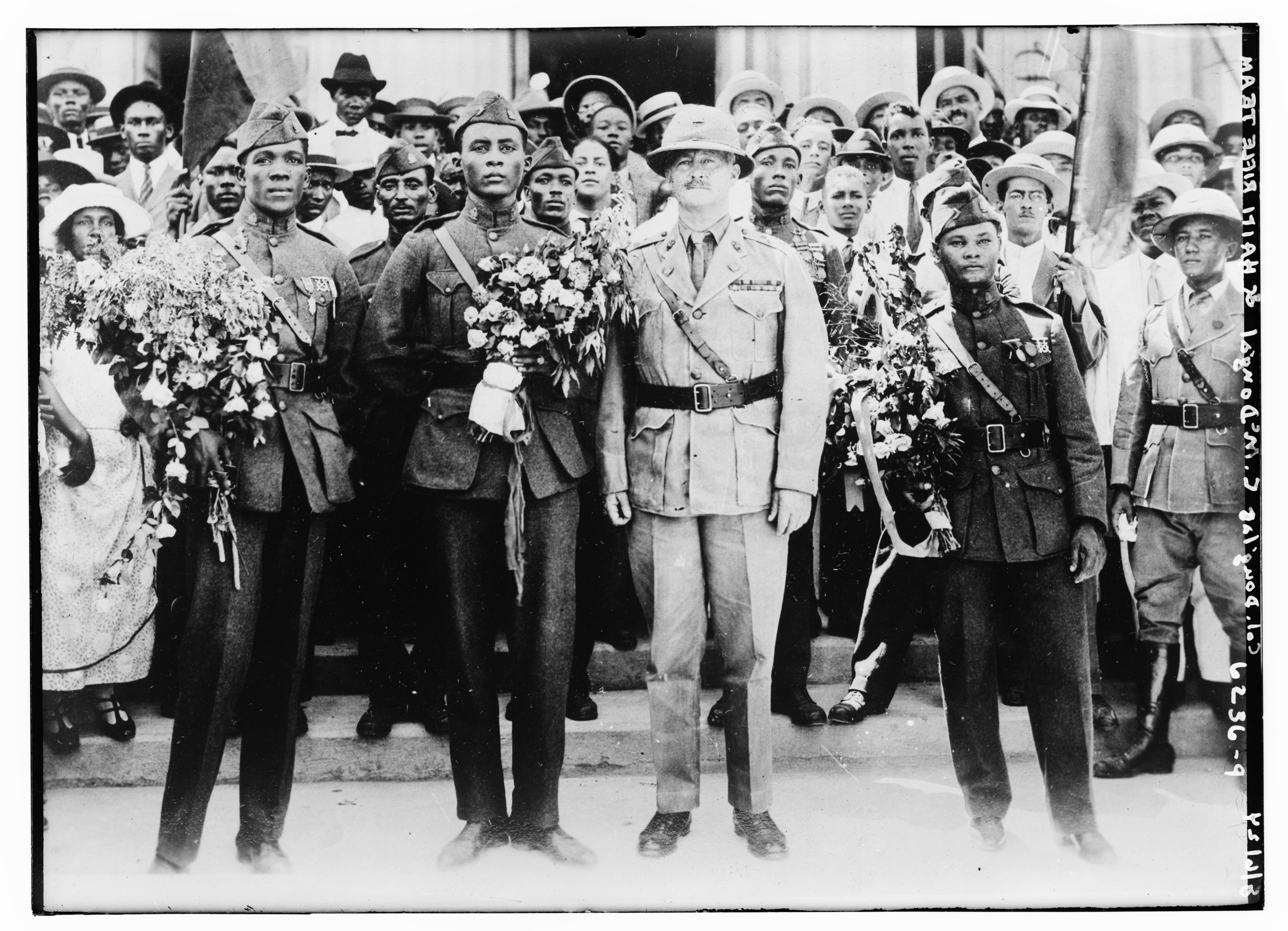
Gendarmes, members of the Haitian rifle team at the 1924 Olympics, with their commandant, Colonel Douglas C. McDougal.

The Commandants were:

- 1915–1918 Smedley D. Butler
- 1918–1919 Alexander S. Williams
- 1919–1921 Frederic M. Wise
- 1921 Richard S. Hooker
- 1921–1925 Douglas C. McDougal
- 1925–1927 Julius S. Turrill
- 1927–1930 Frank E. Evans
- 1930–1933 Richard P. Williams
- 1933–1934 Clayton B. Vogel

The Gendarmerie was nominally subordinate to the President of the Republic, but in practice the Gendarmerie Commandant had to run everything through American officials, especially during the tenure of High Commissioner John H. Russell Jr. In a March 14, 1927 letter to the Marine Corps Commandant Lejeune, Gendarmerie Commandant Turrill wrote:

When I get any instrutions from the President I always have to get General Russell's approval on such orders before carrying them out... Nothing of importance can be done in the Gendarmerie without General Russell's sanction.

== See also ==
- Military history of Haiti
- Monroe Doctrine
