= Roger Gaillard =

Haitian historian and novelist

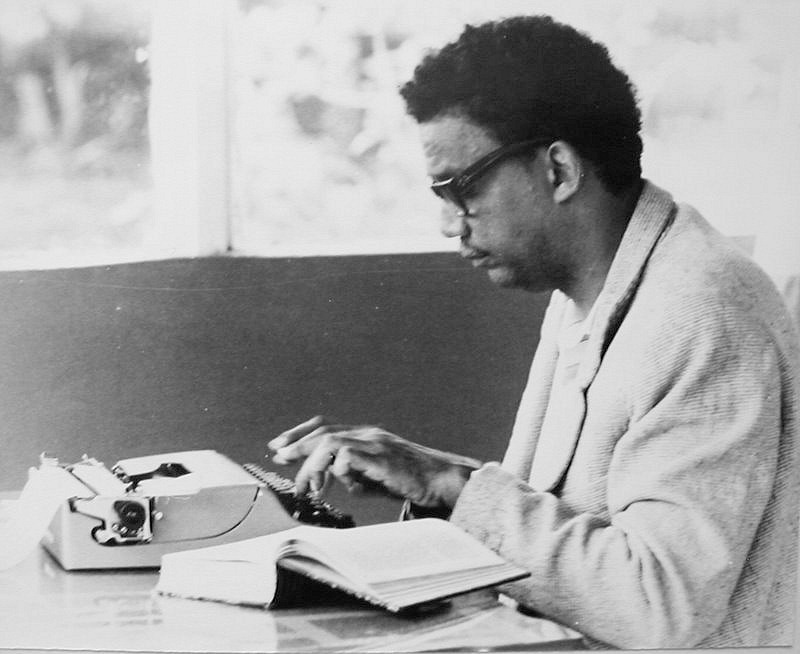
Roger Gaillard at his residence in Kenscoff of 1973.

Roger Gaillard (Port-au-Prince, 10 April 1923 – 2000) was a Haitian historian and novelist. Born in Port-au-Prince, Gaillard earned a philosophy degree at the University of Paris in France. He is best known for his multiple-volume chronicle of the United States' occupation of Haiti.

== Selected works ==
- L'Univers Romanesque de Jacques Roumain (1965)
- La Destinée de Carl Brouard (1966)
- Les Cent Jours de Rosalvo Bobo (1973)
- Charlemagne Péralte le Caco (1982)
- La Guérilla de Batraville (1983)
- La Déroute de l'Intelligence (1992)
