= Cacos (military group) =

Haitian rebel group

In Haitian history, Cacos were revolutionary bands of armed men, originally drawn from the country's enslaved population, who came to wield power in the mountainous regions of Haiti following the victory of the Haitian Revolution in 1804. The nickname "cacos" was derived from local terms for the red-plumed Hispaniolan trogon because the insurgents "used to hide, like the bird of the same name, under the leaves so as to come unexpectedly upon and attack their enemy."

== Resistance to the U.S. occupation (1915–1934) ==
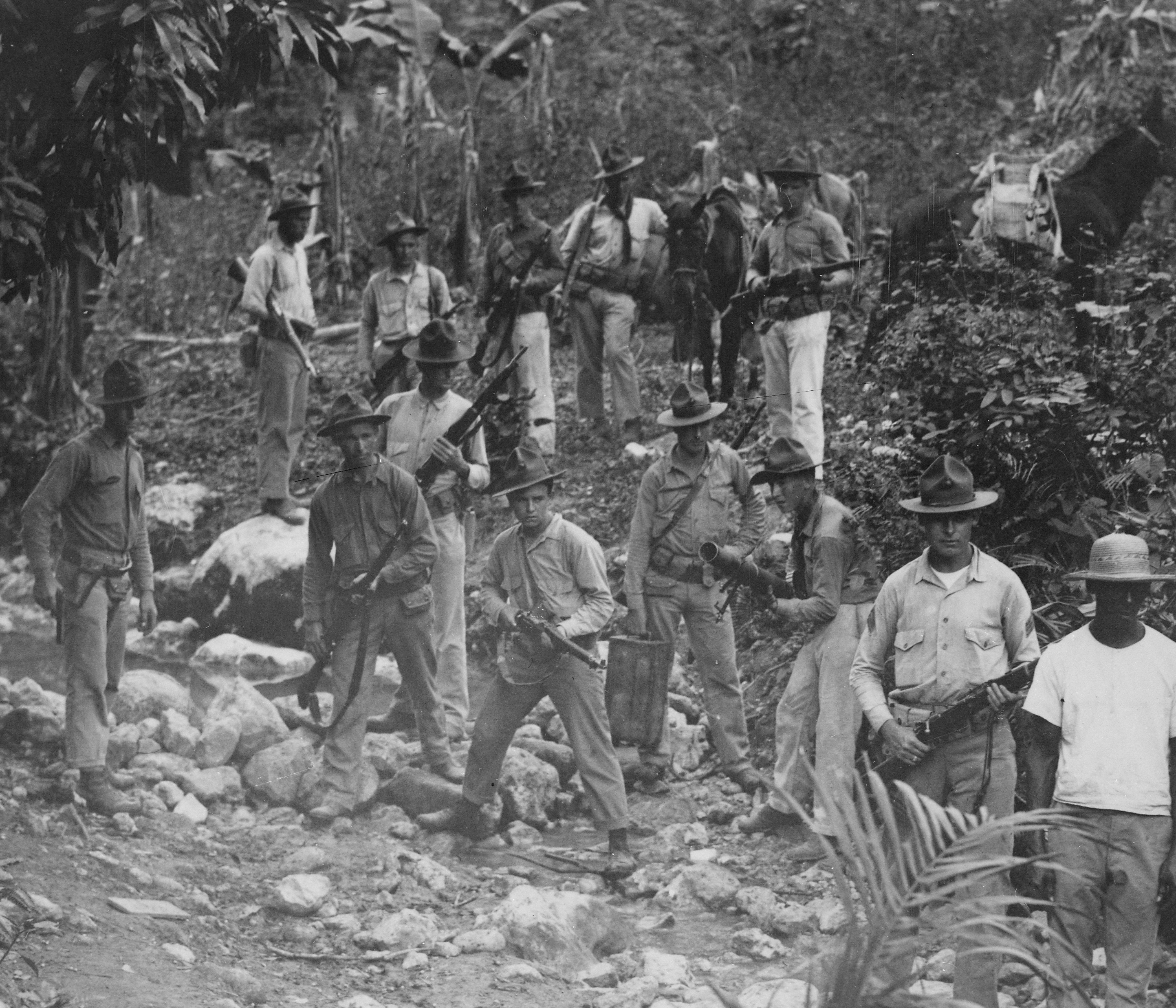
U.S. Marines in search of Cacos, c. 1919

The United States invaded Haiti—ostensibly to restore order in the wake of the assassination of Haiti's president Vilbrun Guillaume Sam—on 28 July 1915 and maintained a force of Marines to occupy the island until 1934. While U.S. forces were able to pacify the cities quite quickly, the Cacos maintained a rebellion in the mountainous areas to the north. Despite lack of local support, near Cap-Haïtien, the Cacos threatened to defeat the U.S. Marines at the Battle of Fort Dipitié, but skillful use of reinforcements enabled the Marines to launch a surprise counterattack that resulted in the entire Cacos force being either killed or taken prisoner. The marines then slowly advanced upon the mountainous Cacos territory, eventually trapping and defeating the remnants of the guerilla force at the Battle of Fort Rivière.

== Prominent Cacos leaders ==
- During the occupation era, Rosalvo Bobo was an early leader of the Cacos faction. He led opposition to the U.S.'s initial entry into Haiti but was prevented from ever becoming president when Philippe Sudré Dartiguenave was effectively appointed as a puppet head-of-state under the U.S. occupation.
- Charlemagne Péralte emerged as one of the most prominent Cacos leaders, from his escape from captivity until his death at the hands of U.S. Marines, on 1 November 1919.
- Benoît Batraville, a lieutenant of Péralte's, took over as commander of the Cacos in December 1919. He, too, was killed by U.S. Marines on 20 May 1920.
