= Charlemagne Péralte =

Haitian nationalist leader (1886–1919)

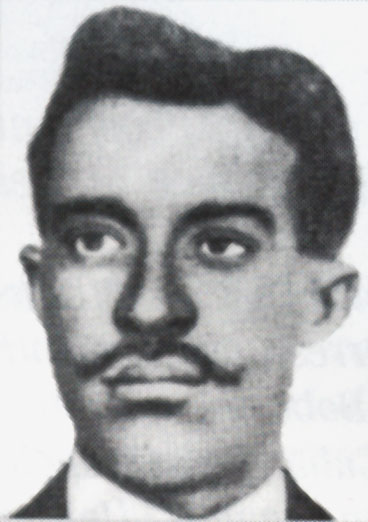
- Born: François Borgia Charlemagne Péralte; 10 October 1885; Hinche, Haiti
- Died: 1 November 1919 (aged 34); Near Sainte-Suzanne, Haiti
- Military career
- Allegiance: Republic of Haiti (1908–1915); Cacos (1915–1919)
- Conflicts: United States occupation of Haiti; Second Caco War; Battle of Port-au-Prince

François Borgia Charlemagne Péralte (10 October 1885 – 1 November 1919) was a Haitian nationalist leader who led armed resistance against the United States occupation of Haiti from 1917 to 1919. He led Cacos guerrilla fighters against forces of the United States Marine Corps and the Gendarmerie of Haiti before his assassination by U.S. Marines. A photograph of his corpse, widely distributed as a deterrent to Haitian resistance, made him a martyr and national hero in Haiti.

== Early life ==
Péralte was born in Hinche, Haiti, to Haitian army general Remi Masséna Péralte and seamstress Anne-Marie Claude Emmanuel. Péralte grew up in a middle-class family of the "rural bourgeoisie," attending the prestigious Saint-Louis Gonzague School in Port-au-Prince. From 1908 to 1915, Péralte held several government posts throughout Haiti, including mayor of Hinche, a justice of the peace in Mirebalais, and commander of the Port-de-Paix administrative region, where he oversaw both political and military affairs.

== Guerrilla resistance ==
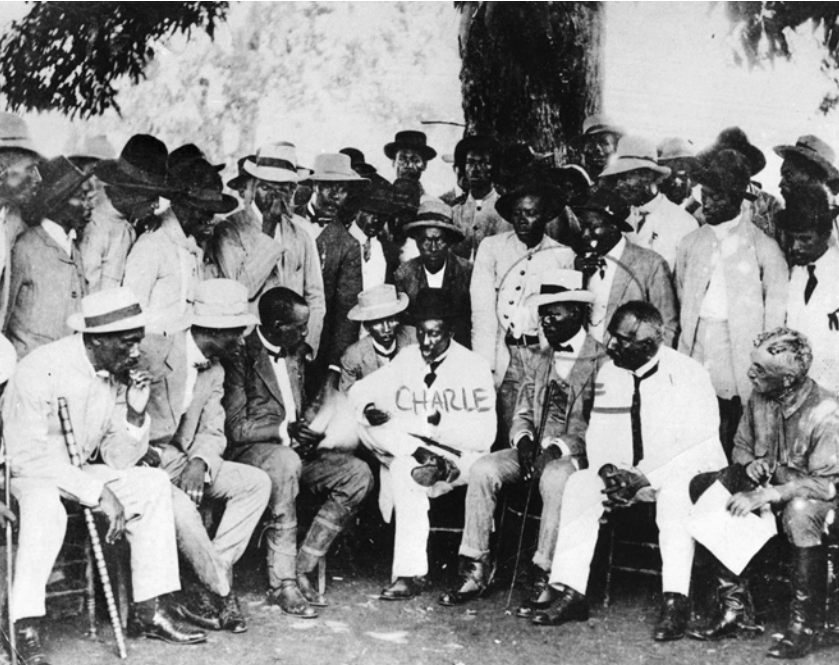
Colonel Littleton Waller (seated, far right) negotiating with Cacos leaders including Péralte (circled), October 1915

The United States invaded Haiti in July 1915, officially to protect American lives during a period of extreme political instability, exemplified by the country's seven presidents between 1912 and 1915, only one of which completed his term in office. The U.S. also sought to ensure Haiti was a viable coaling station on the way to the Panama Canal, and to ensure that Haitian rebels did not loot the national bank's gold reserves in Port-au-Prince. After American forces defeated Cacos rebels in the First Caco War in November 1915, it established the Gendarmerie of Haiti to enforce the law under the supervision of the United States Marine Corps.

Péralte left government service after the occupation began and returned to Hinche to farm, later joining the Haitian "Revolutionary Committee" that sought to negotiate with Colonel Littleton Waller, the commander of USMC forces in Haiti. In October 1917, Péralte participated in a failed raid on a Gendarmerie payroll for which he was sentenced to five years in prison in early 1918. He escaped from custody in September and began leading Cacos in raids against Gendarmerie targets, stating that he would "drive the invaders into the sea and free Haiti." By mid-1919, his force of 5,000 Cacos grew too large for the Gendarmerie to quell, and attracted the attention of the Marine Corps. On 6 October 1919, Péralte led a raid on Port-au-Prince which was easily repelled by Marine Corps and Gendarmerie troops; after only a few minutes, 30 Cacos and 20 horses were killed, and much of their weaponry was captured, but Péralte escaped.

== Assassination ==
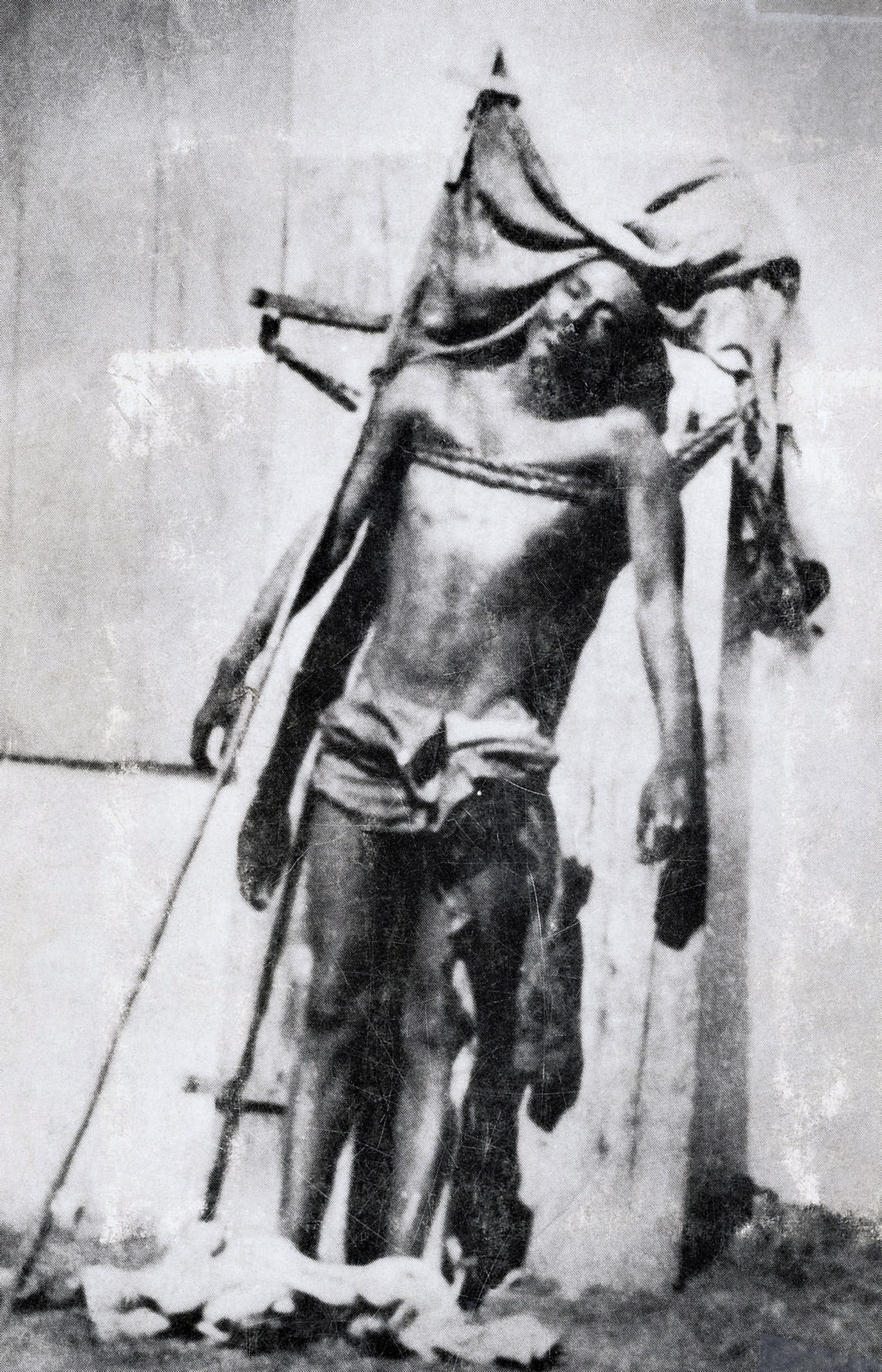
The widely distributed photograph of Péralte's corpse

Several weeks later, Péralte was formulating an attack on Grande-Rivière-du-Nord, badly needing a victory after the failed raid on Port-au-Prince. As Péralte was well-insulated from battles and had an extensive intelligence network, a plan was hatched by Marine Corps Sergeant Herman H. Hanneken to covertly assassinate him. For a payment of $2,000 (equivalent to $37,000 in 2025), the Marines were informed by former Grande-Rivière-du-Nord police chief Jean-Baptiste Conzé that Péralte was garrisoned at Fort Capois in the mountains near Sainte-Suzanne. Before leading Hanneken to Péralte, Conzé established cover as a Cacos ally by fomenting a false insurrection against the Gendarmerie in Grande-Rivière-du-Nord, with Hanneken leading a staged Gerndarmerie attack on Conzé and his rebels. Hanneken feigned a loss and was seen with fabricated wounds, bolstering Conzé's credibility with Péralte.

On the evening of 31 October 1919, Hannekin and Corporal William R. Button dressed in Cacos clothing and blackened their skin with cork ash, blending into a band of disguised Gendarmes led by Conzé. They successfully passed through six Cacos outposts—Hannekin's fluency in Haitian Creole bolstering their cover—before reaching Péralte's camp, with Conzé providing the correct password for entry. Spotting Péralte, Hannekin fatally shot him twice in the chest with his .45 caliber pistol, while Button fired his previously concealed Browning Automatic Rifle at the slain leader's bodyguards. After repelling repeated Cacos attacks throughout the night, the Marines strapped Péralte's corpse to a mule and made their way back to Grande-Rivière-du-Nord.

== Aftermath ==
As a psychological warfare tactic to deter resistance, U.S. forces distributed a photograph of Péralte's corpse tied to a door. The image's resemblance to a crucifixion instead established Péralte as a martyr and national hero whose likeness has been reproduced on Haitian postage stamps and coins. In 1937, Marine Sergeant Julian A. Kelly told the New Orleans Times-Picayune that he was ordered to covertly bury Péralte in the horse lot of Post Charbert, approximately 35 kilometres (22 mi) east of Cap-Haitien near Caracol.

After Péralte's death, leadership of the Cacos passed to Benoît Batraville, though their ability to mount resistance in northern Haiti was eliminated, forcing them to concentrate on positions in the central and southern regions.

For their daring actions in the assassination of Péralte, Hanneken and Button were awarded the Medal of Honor by the United States and the Haitian Médaille militaire by President Philippe Sudré Dartiguenave.
