= United States occupation of Haiti =

1915–1934 military occupation

- Part of the Banana Wars
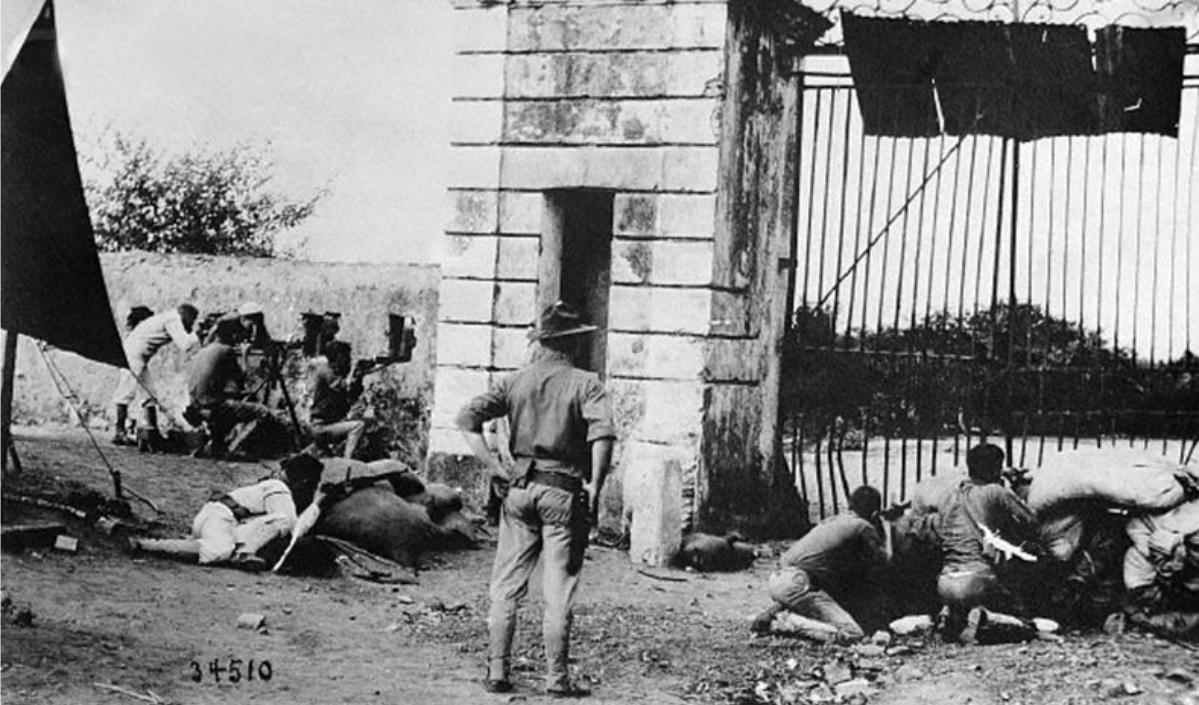
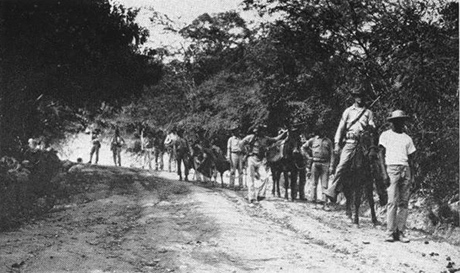
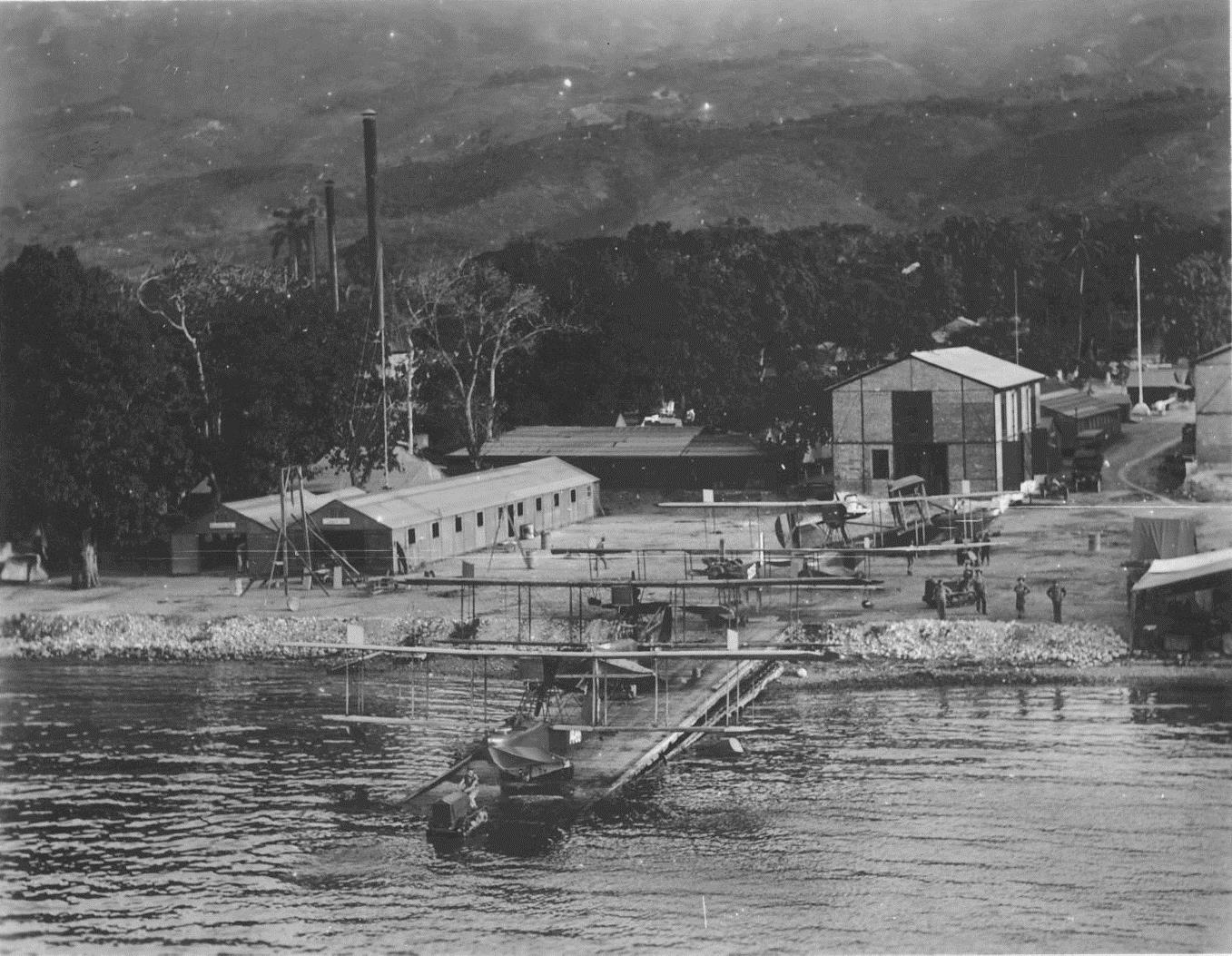
- Top to bottom, left to right: US Marines in 1915 defending entrance gate in Cap-Haïtien, US Marines and a Haitian guide patrolling the jungle during the Battle of Fort Dipitié, US Navy Curtiss HS-2Ls and other airplanes in Haiti c. 1919
Date	July 28, 1915 – August 1, 1934 (19 years and 4 days)
Location	Haiti
Result	American victory

Belligerents
United States; Haiti	Haitian rebels

Commanders and leaders
Woodrow Wilson; Herbert Hoover; William Caperton; John H. Russell Jr. Smedley Butler; Philippe Dartiguenave; Louis Borno; Louis Eugène Roy; Sténio Vincent	Charlemagne Péralte †; Benoît Batraville (executed)

Strength
First Caco War: 2,029 Second Caco War: 1,500 US Marines; 2,700 Haitian Gendarmes	First Caco War: 5,000

Casualties and losses
First Caco War: Unknown, a few casualties 18 wounded Second Caco War: 28+ Americans killed, total unknown 70+ Gendarmes killed, total unknown Total; 146 American deaths	First Caco War: 200 killed Second Caco War: 2,000+ killed
- 3,250–15,000 Haitian deaths Hundreds to 5,500 forced labor deaths

The United States occupation of Haiti began on July 28, 1915, when 330 US Marines landed at Port-au-Prince, Haiti, after the National City Bank of New York (now Citibank) convinced US President Woodrow Wilson to take control of the country's political and financial interests. The occupation took place following years of socioeconomic instability within Haiti that culminated in the lynching of Haitian President Vilbrun Guillaume Sam by a mob angered by his executions of political prisoners.

During the occupation, Haiti had three new presidents while the United States ruled as a military regime through martial law, led by Marines and the US-created Gendarmerie of Haiti. A corvée system of forced labor was used by the US for infrastructure projects, resulting in hundreds to thousands of deaths. The occupation ended the constitutional ban on foreign ownership of land, which had existed since the foundation of Haiti.

The occupation ended on August 1, 1934, after President Franklin D. Roosevelt reaffirmed an August 1933 disengagement agreement. The last contingent of Marines departed on August 15, 1934, after a formal transfer of authority to the Gendarmerie of Haiti.

== Background ==
=== Haitian Revolution and US relations ===
In the late 18th century, some Haitians fought beside Patriot partisans in the American Revolutionary War. Haiti, originally the wealthiest region in the Americas when it was the French colony of Saint-Domingue, underwent a slave revolt beginning in 1791 which led to a successful revolution in 1804, establishing the Republic of Haiti as an independent nation.

The Haitian revolution frightened slaveholders living in the Southern United States, who feared the successful revolt would inspire violent uprisings elsewhere. Such sentiments strained relations between the US and Haiti, with the US initially refusing to recognize Haitian independence and slaveholders advocating for a trade embargo against the Caribbean nation. The Haiti indemnity controversy – which the Kingdom of France forced upon Haiti through gunboat diplomacy in 1825 due to French financial losses following the revolution – resulted with Haiti using much of its revenue to pay foreign debts by the late 19th century.

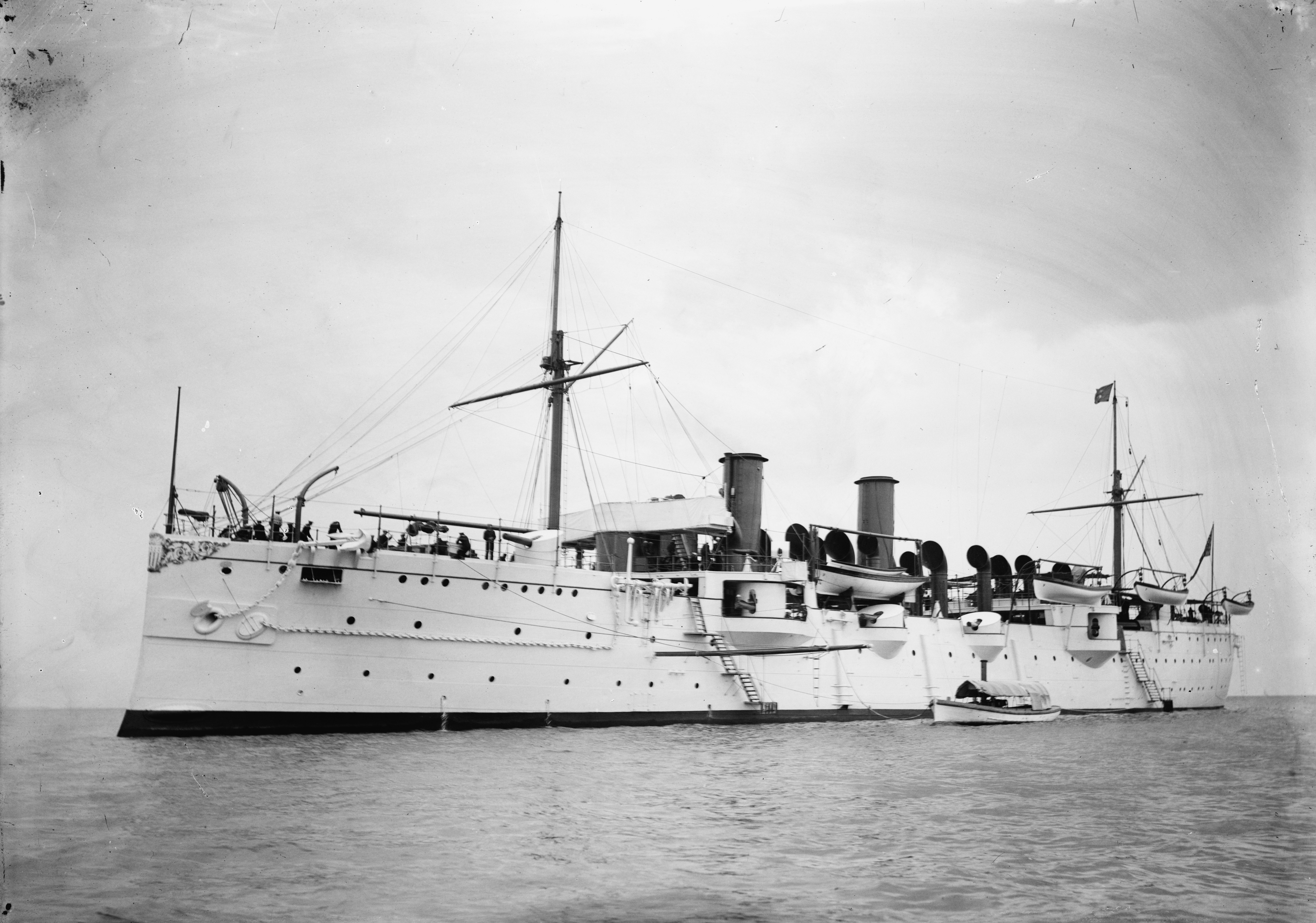
USS Philadelphia, flagship of the fleet involved in the 1890 Môle Saint-Nicolas affair which saw the United States using gunboat diplomacy in an attempt to obtain Môle-Saint-Nicolas

The US had long been interested in Haiti following the revolution. In 1868, US President Andrew Johnson suggested annexing Hispaniola, including Haiti. The year prior, the government of Santo Domingo (now known as the Dominican Republic) had requested to be annexed by the United States out of fear of an invasion by its neighbor Haiti. In 1890, US President Benjamin Harrison, on the advice of Secretary of State James G. Blaine, ordered Rear-Admiral Bancroft Gherardi to persuade newly assumed Haitian President Florvil Hyppolite to lease the port of Môle Saint-Nicolas to the US. Commanding the USS Philadelphia, Ghrerardi arrived with his fleet at the capital city of Port-au-Prince to demand the acquisition of Môle Saint-Nicolas. Hyppolite refused any agreement, and The New York Times wrote that the Haitians' "semi-barbaric minds saw in [Gherardi's fleet] a threat of violence." Upon returning to the US in 1891, Gherardi said in an interview with the Times that Haiti would soon experience further instability, suggesting that future governments would abide by US demands.

By the 1890s, Haiti became reliant on importing most of its goods from the US while it exported the majority of its production to France. The Roosevelt Corollary, which instituted an interventionist attitude in US foreign policy towards Latin America, affected relations with Haiti. By 1910, President William Howard Taft attempted to introduce US businesses to Haiti in order to deter European influence and granted a large loan to Haiti to pay off its foreign debt, though this proved to be fruitless due to the size of the debt.

=== German presence ===
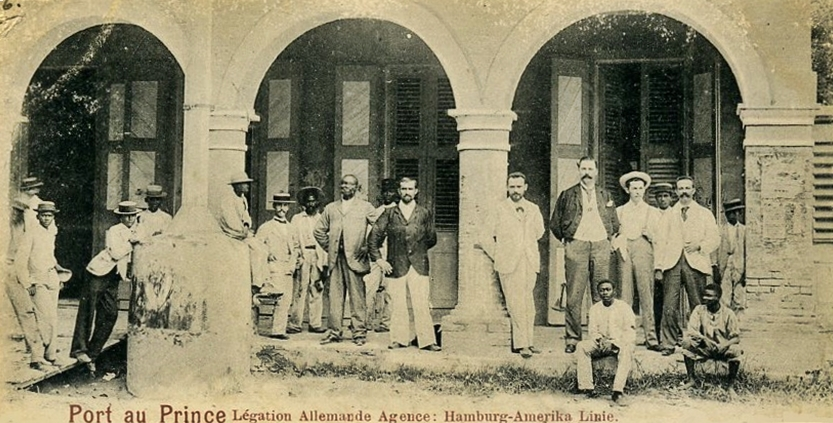
Personnel from the German legation and the Hamburg-Amerika Line

The US was not concerned with French influence in Haiti, though German influence raised concern. Germany had previously intervened in Haiti, including the Lüders affair in 1897, and had been influencing neighboring Caribbean nations during the previous few decades. Germany had also become increasingly hostile to US dominance of the region under the Monroe Doctrine. In the lead-up to World War I, the strategic importance of Haiti, along with the German influence there, worried US President Woodrow Wilson, who feared a German presence near the Panama Canal Zone.

US concern over German ambitions was mirrored by apprehension and rivalry between American businessmen and the small German community in Haiti, which, although numbering only about 200 in 1910, wielded a disproportionate amount of economic power. German nationals owned and operated utilities in Cap-Haïtien and Port-au-Prince, including the main wharf and a tramway in the capital, and also had built the railway serving the Plain of the Cul-de-Sac.

The German community was more willing to integrate into Haitian society than any other group of European foreigners, including the more numerous French. Some Germans had married into Haiti's most prominent mulatto families of African-French descent, enabling them to bypass the constitutional prohibition against foreigners owning land. German residents retained strong ties to their homeland and sometimes aided German military and intelligence networks in Haiti. They also served as the principal financiers of Haiti's numerous revolutions, floating loans at high interest rates to the competing political factions.

=== Haitian instability ===
In the first decades of the 20th century, Haiti remained heavily in debt while also suffering from political instability, to the point where the Wilson administration viewed Haiti as a potential national security threat. Tensions were high between two main groups: wealthy French-speaking mulatto Haitians who represented the minority of the population, and poor Afro-Haitians who spoke Haitian Creole. Various cacos – peasant militias from the Massif du Nord mountain range in the north – were often funded by foreign governments.

Between June and December 1902, a civil war was fought between the government of Haitian President Pierre Théoma Boisrond-Canal and General Pierre Nord Alexis against rebels led by Anténor Firmin, resulting in Alexis claiming the presidency. In 1908. Alexis was forced from power and a series of short lived presidencies came and went: his successor François C. Antoine Simon in 1911; Cincinnatus Leconte in 1911–1912; Michel Oreste in 1913–1914; and Oreste Zamor in 1914. Between 1911 and 1915, the Haitian presidency endured frequent changeover due to assassinations, coups and forced exiles.

=== American financial interests ===
Prior to the occupation, Haiti's foreign debt constituted 80% of its annual revenue, though it was able to meet financial obligations, especially when compared to Ecuador, Honduras, and Mexico at that time. In the 20th century, the US had become Haiti's largest trade partner, replacing France, with American businesses expanding their presence in Haiti. Influential Germans within Haiti were regarded as a threat to American financial interests, with businesses ultimately advocating for an invasion of the country.

In 1903, Haitian authorities began to accuse the National Bank of Haiti of fraud. By 1908, Minister of Finance Frédéric Marcelin pushed for the National Bank to work on the behalf of common Haitians, though French officials began to devise plans to reorganize their financial interests. Pierre Carteron, France's envoy to Haiti, wrote following Marcelin's objections: "It is of the highest importance that we study how to set up a new French credit establishment in Port-au-Prince ... Without any close link to the Haitian government."

American businesses had pursued the control of Haiti for years. Beginning in 1909, Frank A. Vanderlip, president of National City Bank of New York (now Citibank), plotted the bank's takeover of Haiti's financial system as part of his larger expansion plans in international markets. Speyer & Co. promoted a stock to Vanderlip to invest in Haiti's national railroad, which held an import monopoly in Port-au-Prince. The Haitian government faced conflict with the bank over the railroad regarding payments to creditors, later leading to the bank seeking to control the entirety of the country's finances. In 1910 Vanderlip wrote to James Stillman, the bank's chairman: "In the future, this stock will give us a foothold [in Haiti] and I think we will perhaps later undertake the reorganization of the Government’s currency system, which, I believe, I see my way clear to do with practically no monetary risk".

From 1910 to 1911, the US Department of State backed a consortium of American investors – headed by National City Bank – to acquire a managing stake of the National Bank of Haiti to create the Bank of the Republic of Haiti (BNRH), which served as both the country's sole commercial bank and its treasury. France also kept a stake in the BNRH.

US officials were not knowledgeable about Haiti and often relied on information from American businessmen. Secretary of State William Jennings Bryan fired established Latin American experts upon his confirmation, replacing them with political allies. He initially proposed forgiving the debt of Caribbean nations, but Wilson viewed this idea as too radical. Having little firsthand knowledge of Haiti, Bryan relied on the vice president of National City Bank, Roger Leslie Farnham, for information about the country. Farnham had an extensive background working as a financial advisor, lobbyist, journalist and purchasing agent between the US and the Caribbean, with American historian Brenda Gayle Plummer writing, "Farnham ... is often portrayed by historians as the deus ex machina single-handedly plotting the American intervention of 1915." Throughout the 1910s, Farnham demanded successive Haitian governments grant him control of the nation's customs, its only source of revenue, threatening U.S. intervention when Haiti refused on the grounds of national sovereignty. John H. Allen, the manager of the BNRH, met with Bryan for consultation in 1912, with Allen later sharing an account of Bryan being surprised about Haitian culture and stating, "Dear me, think of it! Niggers speaking French!"

In 1914, with France losing ties to Haiti as it was focused its efforts on World War I, Farnham suggested to the United States Congress that the BNRH's "active management has been from New York." Allen later stated that if the US permanently occupied Haiti, he supported the National City Bank in acquiring all shares of BNRH, believing that it would "pay 20% or better." Farnham persuaded Bryan to have the US invade Haiti during a telephone call on January 22, 1914, arguing that conditions in the country were not improving and that US troops would be welcomed by the civilian population. Farnham also exaggerated the role of European influence, even convincing Bryan that France and Germany – two nations then at war with each other – were plotting in cooperation to obtain the port at Môle Saint-Nicholas. Farnham concluded that Haiti would not improve "until such time as some stronger outside power steps in." US diplomats ultimately drafted plans to take over Haiti's finances, dubbed the "Farnham Plan."

After US officials traveled to Haiti to propose the plan, Haitian legislators denounced their minister of foreign affairs, saying he was "endeavoring to sell the country to the United States" according to a State Department telegram. Due to Haitian opposition to the plan, the BNRH withheld funds from the government and funded rebels to destabilize the country in order to justify US intervention, generating 12% gains in interest by holding onto the funds. On January 27, 1914, President Oreste was deposed in a coup and two generals, Charles and Oreste Zamor, seized control. In response, the USS Montana sent a Marine detachment to Port-au-Prince on January 29 to protect US interests. On February 5, military forces from the French cruiser Conde and British HMS Lancaster also landed troops. These units agreed to leave the city and boarded their ships on February 9.

Allen telegrammed the State Department on April 8, requesting that the United States Navy sail to Port-au-Prince to deter possible rebellions. That summer, the BNRH began to threaten withholding payments to the Haitian government. Simultaneously, Bryan telegrammed the United States consul in Cap-Haïtien, writing that that the US "earnestly desires successfully carrying out of Farnham's plan."

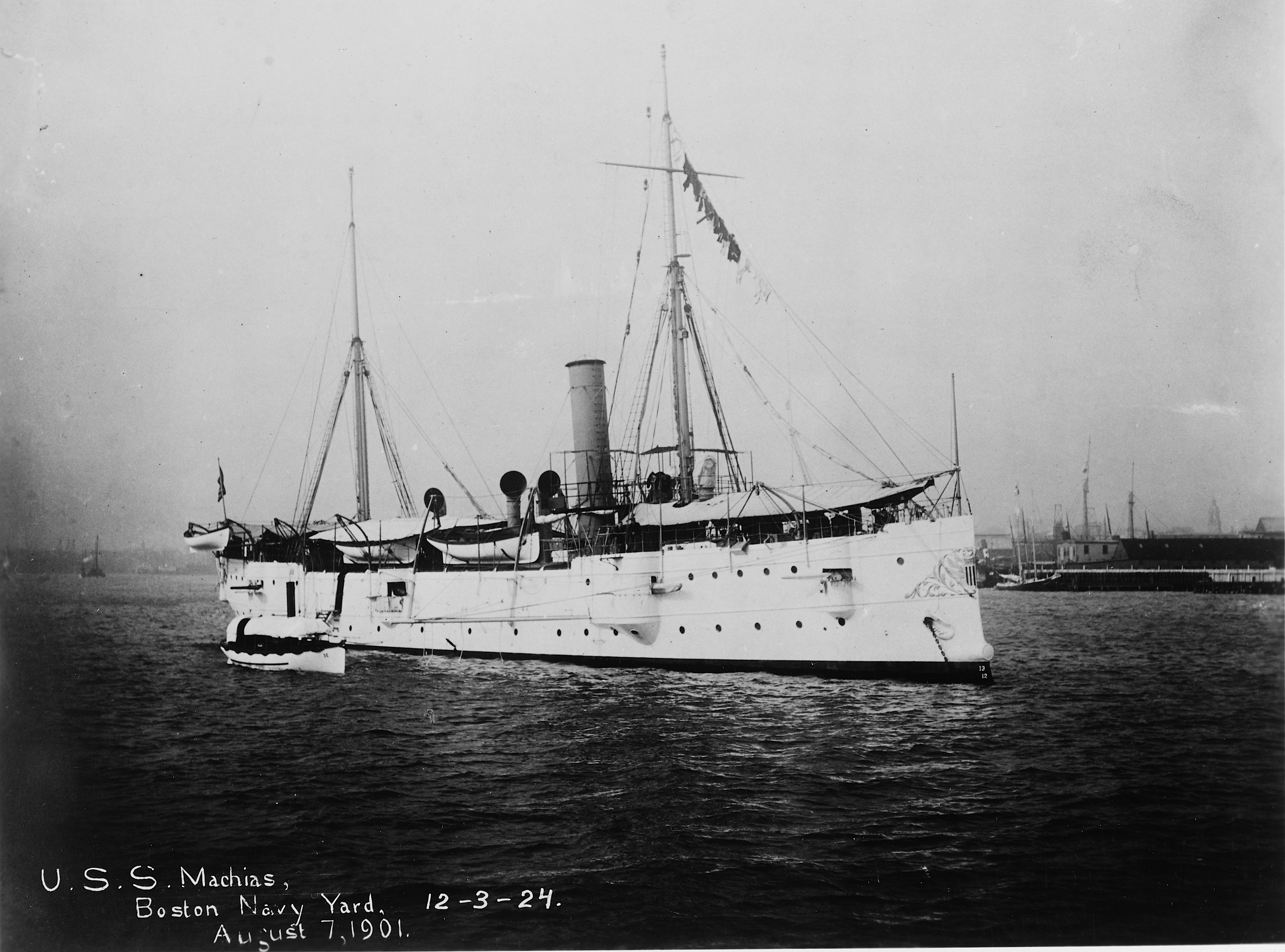
Gold from Haiti was placed onto the USS Machias by US Marines and transported to 55 Wall Street in 1914

American bankers raised fears that Haiti would default on debt payments despite its consistent compliance with loan conditions, calling for the seizure of Haiti's national bank. National City Bank officials – acting on behalf of Farnham – demanded the State Department provide military support to acquire Haiti's national reserves, with the bank arguing that Haiti had become too unstable to safeguard the assets. Urged by the National City Bank and the BNRH, with BNRH already under direction of American business interests, on December 17 eight Marines walked into Haiti's national bank and took custody of the country's gold reserves of about US$500,000 (about the equivalent to $15,659,468 in 2024). The Marines packed the gold into wooden boxes, loaded them into a wagon and transported the gold under the protection of plainclothes troops lining the route to the USS Machias, which transferred its load to the National City Bank's New York vault. This provided the US with a large amount of leverage over the Haitian government, though American businesses demanded further intervention. The National City Bank would go on to acquire some of its largest gains in the 1920s due to debt payments from Haiti, according to later filings to the Senate Finance Committee, with debt payments to the bank comprising 25% of Haiti's revenue.

== American invasion ==
In February 1915, Vilbrun Guillaume Sam, son of a former Haitian president, took power as President of Haiti. The culmination of his repressive measures came on July 27, when he ordered the execution of 167 political prisoners, including former president Zamor, who was being held in a Port-au-Prince jail. This infuriated the population, which rose up against Sam's government. Sam, who had taken refuge in the French embassy, was lynched by an enraged mob in Port-au-Prince when they learned of the executions. The United States regarded the anti-American revolt against Sam as a threat to American business interests in the country, especially the Haitian American Sugar Company. When the caco-supported anti-American Rosalvo Bobo emerged as the next president of Haiti, the United States government decided to act quickly to preserve its economic dominance.

In April 1915, Secretary Bryan expressed support for invading Haiti to President Wilson, writing "The American interests are willing to remain there, with a view of purchasing a controlling interest and making the bank a branch of the American bank – they are willing to do this provided this government takes the steps necessary to protect them and their idea seems to be that no protection will be sufficient that does not include control of the Customs House."

On July 28, Wilson ordered 340 Marines to occupy Port-au-Prince, and the invasion took place the same day. The invasion was led by Rear Admiral William Banks Caperton, commander of the Cruiser Squadron of the US Atlantic Fleet, and consisted of the cruiser USS Washington's Marine detachment and three companies of sailors. They were led by Caperton's chief of staff, Captain Edward L. Beach Sr., who joined in them in Port-au-Prince. Landings also took place in Cap-Haïtien from other ships, USS Eagle and USS Nashville. In August, the 1st and 2nd Marine Regiments also arrived. Only one Haitian soldier, Pierre Sully, tried to resist the invasion, and he was shot dead by the Marines.

The Secretary of the Navy instructed the invasion commander to "protect American and foreign" interests. Wilson also wanted to rewrite the Haitian constitution, which banned foreign ownership of land, to replace it with one that guaranteed American financial control. To avoid public criticism, Wilson claimed the occupation was a mission to "re-establish peace and order ... [and] has nothing to do with any diplomatic negotiations of the past or the future," as disclosed by Rear Admiral Caperton.

== American occupation ==
=== Dartiguenave presidency ===
==== US installs Dartiguenave as president ====
Haitian presidents were not elected by universal suffrage but rather chosen by the Senate. The American occupying authorities therefore looked to find a presidential candidate ready to cooperate with them. Philippe Sudré Dartiguenave, president of the Senate and among the mulatto Haitian elite who supported the United States, agreed to accept the presidency of Haiti in August 1915 after several other candidates had refused. The United States would later go on to install more wealthy mulatto Haitians in positions of power.

==== US takeover of Haitian institutions ====
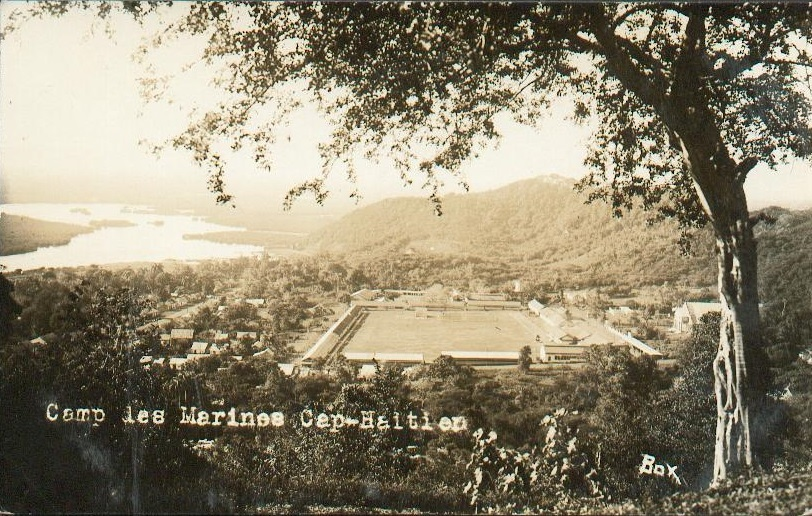
Marine base at Cap-Haïtien

For several decades, the Haitian government had been receiving large loans from both American and French banks, and with the political chaos the government was growing increasingly incapable of repaying their debts. If the anti-American government of Rosalvo Bobo prevailed, there was no guarantee of debt repayment, and American businesses would refuse to continue investing there. Within six weeks of the occupation, US government representatives seized control of Haiti's customs houses and administrative institutions, including the banks and the national treasury. Under US government control, 40% of Haiti's national income was designated to repay debts to American and French banks. In September 1915, the United States Senate ratified the Haitian-American Convention, a treaty granting the United States security and economic oversight of Haiti for a 10-year period. Haiti's legislature initially refused to ratify the treaty, though Admiral Caperton threatened to withhold payments to Haiti until the treaty was signed. The treaty gave the president of the United States the power to appoint a customs receiver general, economic advisors, public works engineers; and to assign American military officers to oversee a Haitian gendarmerie. Haiti's economic functions were overseen by the United States Department of State, while the United States Navy was tasked with infrastructure and healthcare works, though the Navy ultimately held more authority. Officials from the United States then wielded veto power over all governmental decisions in Haiti, and Marine Corps commanders served as administrators in the departments. The original treaty was to be in effect for 10 years, though an additional agreement in 1917 expanded the United States' power for 20 years. For the next 19 years, US State Department advisers ruled Haiti, their authority enforced by the Marine Corps.

The Gendarmerie of Haiti, now known as the Garde d'Haïti, was also created and controlled by US Marines throughout the occupation, initially led by Major Smedley Butler. Caperton ordered his 2,500 Marines to occupy all of Haiti's districts, equipping them with airplanes, cars, and trucks. Five airfields were constructed, and at least three airplanes were present in Haiti. Marines were tasked with multiple duties for their districts; law enforcement, tax collection, medicine distribution, and overseeing arbitration.

Economically and politically, the Haitian government relied on American approval for most projects. The 1915 treaty with the United States proved expensive; the Haitian government had such a limited income that it was difficult to hire public workers and officials. Before utilizing any money, the Haitian government had to obtain approval from an American financial advisor, and by 1918 the government relied on American officials for approval of any laws due to fears of violating the treaty.

==== First Caco War ====
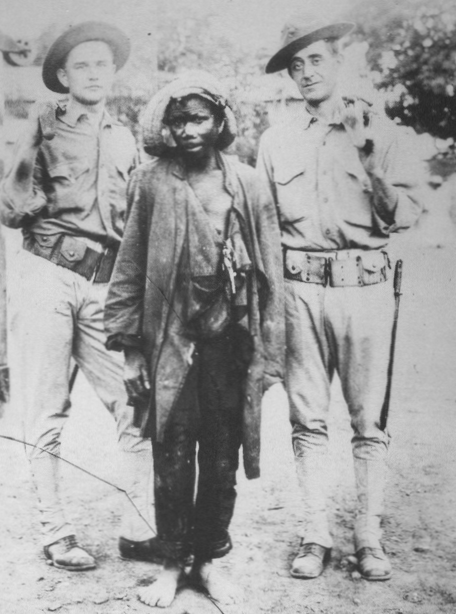
United States Marines with a captured Caco, c. 1915

The installation of a president without the consent of Haitians and the forced labor of the corvée system led to opposition of the US occupation immediately after the Marines entered Haiti, creating rebel groups of Haitians who felt they were returning to slavery. The rebels (called "Cacos", after a local bird sharing their ambush tactics) strongly resisted American control of Haiti. The US and Haitian governments began a vigorous campaign to destroy the rebel armies. Perhaps the best-known account of this skirmishing came from Butler, who was awarded a Medal of Honor for his exploits. He was appointed to serve as commanding officer of the Haitian Gendarmerie. He later expressed his disapproval of the US intervention in his 1935 book War Is a Racket.

On November 17, 1915, the Marines captured Fort Rivière, a stronghold of the Caco rebels, which marked the end of the First Caco War. The United States military issued two Haitian Campaign Medals to Marine and naval personnel for service in the country during the periods 1915 and 1919–1920.

==== US forces new Haitian constitution ====
Shortly after installing Dartiguenave as president of Haiti, President Wilson pursued the rewriting of the Constitution of Haiti. One of the main concerns for the United States was the ban of foreigners from owning Haitian land. Early leader Jean-Jacques Dessalines had forbidden land ownership by foreigners when Haiti became independent to deter foreign influence, and since 1804 some Haitians had viewed foreign ownership as anathema. Fearing impeachment and due to opposition of the legislature, Dartiguenave ordered the dissolution of the senate on April 6, 1916, with Butler and Waller enforcing new legislative elections. Colonel Eli K. Cole would later assume Waller's position as commander of the Marines.

The newly elected legislature of Haiti rejected the constitution proposed by the United States. Instead, the legislative body began drafting a new constitution of its own that was in contrast to the interests of the United States. Under orders from the United States, Dartiguenave dissolved the legislature in 1917 after its members refused to approve the proposed constitution, with Butler forcing the closing of the Senate at gunpoint.

Haiti's new constitution was drafted under the supervision of Franklin D. Roosevelt, then Assistant Secretary of the Navy. (Note: Roosevelt asserted his authorship of the Haitian Constitution in several speeches during his 1920 campaign for Vice President – which was at best a politically awkward overstatement and caused some controversy in the campaign.) A referendum in Haiti subsequently approved the constitution in 1918 (by a vote of 98,225 to 768). In the constitution, Haiti explicitly allowed foreigners to control Haitian land for the first time since Haiti's creation. As a result of opposing the United States' effort of rewriting its constitution, Haiti would remain without a legislative branch until 1929.

==== Second Caco War ====
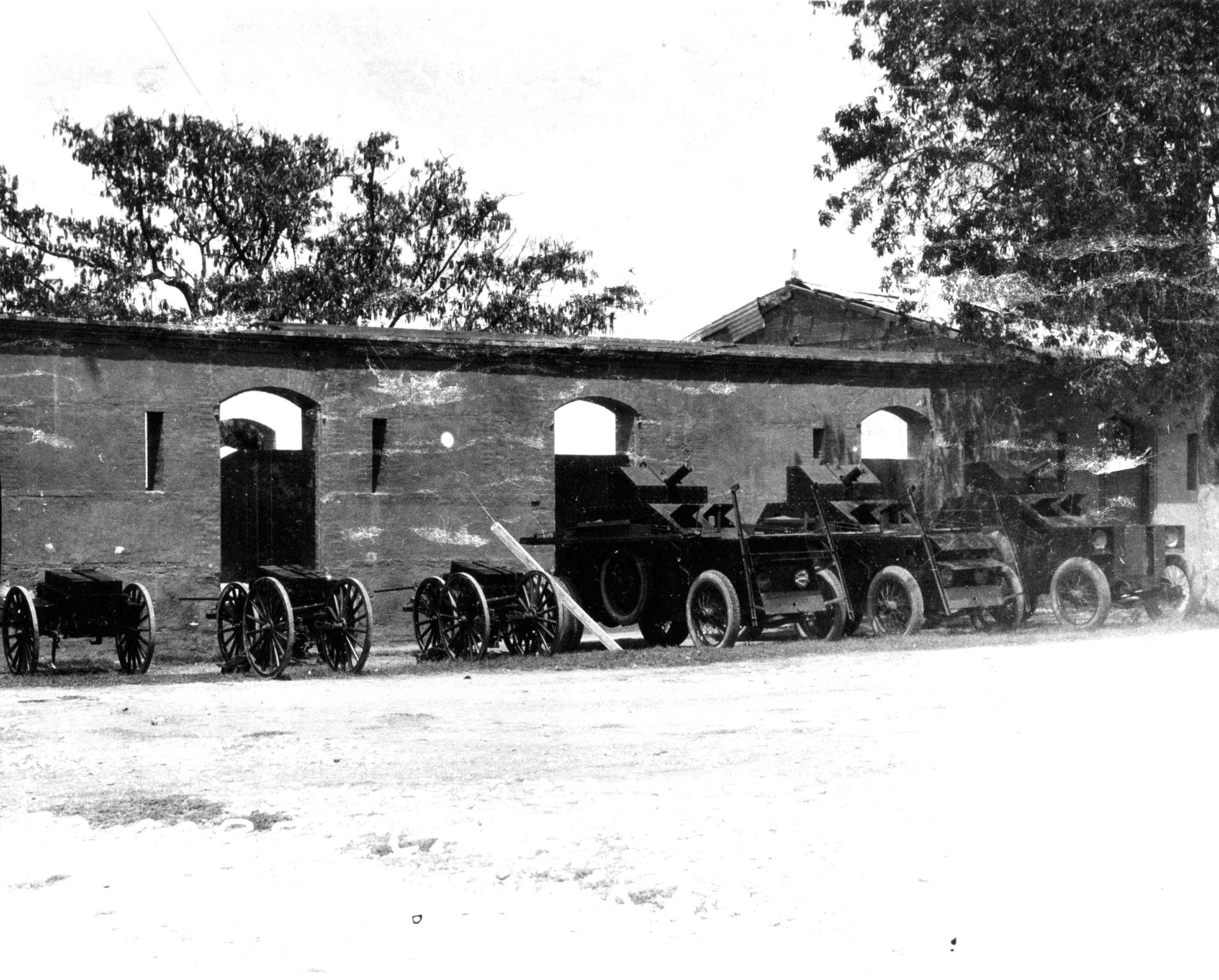
King armored cars of the 1st Armored Car Squadron

The end of the First World War in 1918 deprived the Haitians of their main ally in the liberation struggle. Germany's defeat meant its end as a menace to the US in the Caribbean, as it lost control of Tortuga. Nevertheless, the US continued its occupation of Haiti after the war, despite Wilson's claims at the Paris Peace Conference of 1919 that he supported self-determination among other peoples.

At one time, at least 20% of Haitians had been involved in the rebellion against occupation according to Africanologist Patrick Bellegarde-Smith. The strongest period of unrest culminated in a 1918 rebellion by up to 40,000 former Cacos and other members of the opposition led by Charlemagne Péralte, a former officer of the dissolved Haitian army. The scale of the uprising overwhelmed the Gendarmerie, but Marine reinforcements helped put down the revolt. For their part, the Haitians resorted to non-conventional tactics, being severely outmatched by their occupiers. Prior to his death, Péralte launched an attack on Port-au-Prince. The assassination of Péralte in 1919 solidified US Marine power over the Cacos. The Second Caco War ended with the death of Benoît Batraville in 1920, who had commanded an assault on the Haitian capital. An estimated 2,004 Cacos were killed in the fighting, as well as several dozens of US Marines and Haitian Gendarmes.

==== Congressional investigation ====
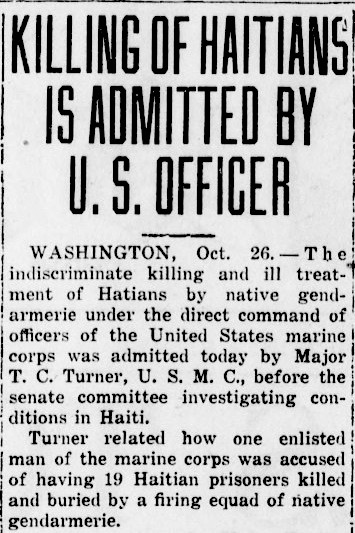
An October 1921 article from the Merced Sun-Star discussing killings of Haitians by US Marines

The educated elite in Haiti was L'Union Patriotique, which established ties with opponents of the occupation in the US. They found allies in the NAACP and among both white and African-American leaders. The NAACP sent civil rights activist James Weldon Johnson, its field secretary, to investigate conditions in Haiti. He published his account in 1920, decrying "the economic corruption, forced labor, press censorship, racial segregation, and wanton violence introduced to Haiti by the US occupation encouraged numerous African Americans to flood the State Department and the offices of Republican Party officials with letters" calling for an end to the abuses and to remove troops. Academic W. E. B. Du Bois, who had Haitian ancestry, demanded a response for the Wilson administration's actions and wrote that US troops "have no designs on the political independence of the island and no desire to exploit it ruthlessly for the take of selfish business interests".

Based on Johnson's investigation, NAACP executive secretary Herbert J. Seligman wrote in the July 10, 1920, The Nation:

Military camps have been built throughout the island. The property of natives has been taken for military use. Haitians carrying a gun were for a time shot on sight. Machine guns have been turned on crowds of unarmed natives, and United States Marines have, by accounts which several of them gave me in casual conversation, not troubled to investigate how many were killed or wounded.

According to Johnson, there was only one reason why the United States occupied Haiti:

[T]o understand why the United States landed and has for five years maintained military forces in that country, why some three thousand Haitian men, women, and children have been shot down by American rifles and machine guns, it is necessary, among other things, to know that the National City Bank of New York is very much interested in Haiti. It is necessary to know that the National City Bank controls the National Bank of Haiti and is the depository for all of the Haitian national funds that are being collected by American officials, and that Mr. R. L. Farnham, vice-president of the National City Bank, is virtually the representative of the State Department in matters relating to the island republic.

Two years after Johnson published his findings, a congressional investigation began in the United States in 1922. The report from Congress did not include testimony from Haitians and ignored allegations involving National City Bank of New York and US Marines. Congress concluded the report by defending a continued occupation of Haiti, arguing that "chronic revolution, anarchy, barbarism, and ruin" would befall Haiti if the United States withdrew. Johnson described the congressional investigation as "on the whole, a whitewash".

=== Borno presidency ===
President Borno on an official visit to the US in 1926

In 1922, Dartiguenave was replaced by Louis Borno, with the US-appointed General John H. Russell, Jr. serving as High Commissioner. General Russell worked on the behalf of the United States Department of State and was authorized as the representative to carry out treaty works.

==== National City Bank acquires BNRH ====
On August 17, 1922, BNRH was completely acquired by National City Bank, its headquarters was moved to New York City, and Haiti's debt to France was moved to be paid to American investors. Following the acquisition of BNRH, the November 1922 issue of National City Bank's employee journal No. 8 exclaimed "Bank of Haiti is Ours!" According to professor Peter James Hudson, "such control represented the end of independence and, as the BNRH and the republic's gold reserve became mere entries on the ledgers of the City Bank, a sign of a return to colonial servitude".

==== Forced labor ====
The Borno-Russell government oversaw the use of forced labor to expand the economy and to complete infrastructure projects. Sisal was introduced to Haiti as a commodity crop, and sugar and cotton became significant exports. However, efforts to develop commercial agriculture met with limited success, in part because much of Haiti's labor force was employed as seasonal workers in the more-established sugar industries of Cuba and the Dominican Republic. An estimated 30,000–40,000 Haitian laborers, known in Cuba as braceros, went annually to the Oriente Province between 1913 and 1931. The Great Depression disastrously affected the prices of Haiti's exports and destroyed the tenuous gains of the previous decade. Under press laws, Borno frequently imprisoned newspaper press that criticized his government.

==== Les Cayes massacre ====
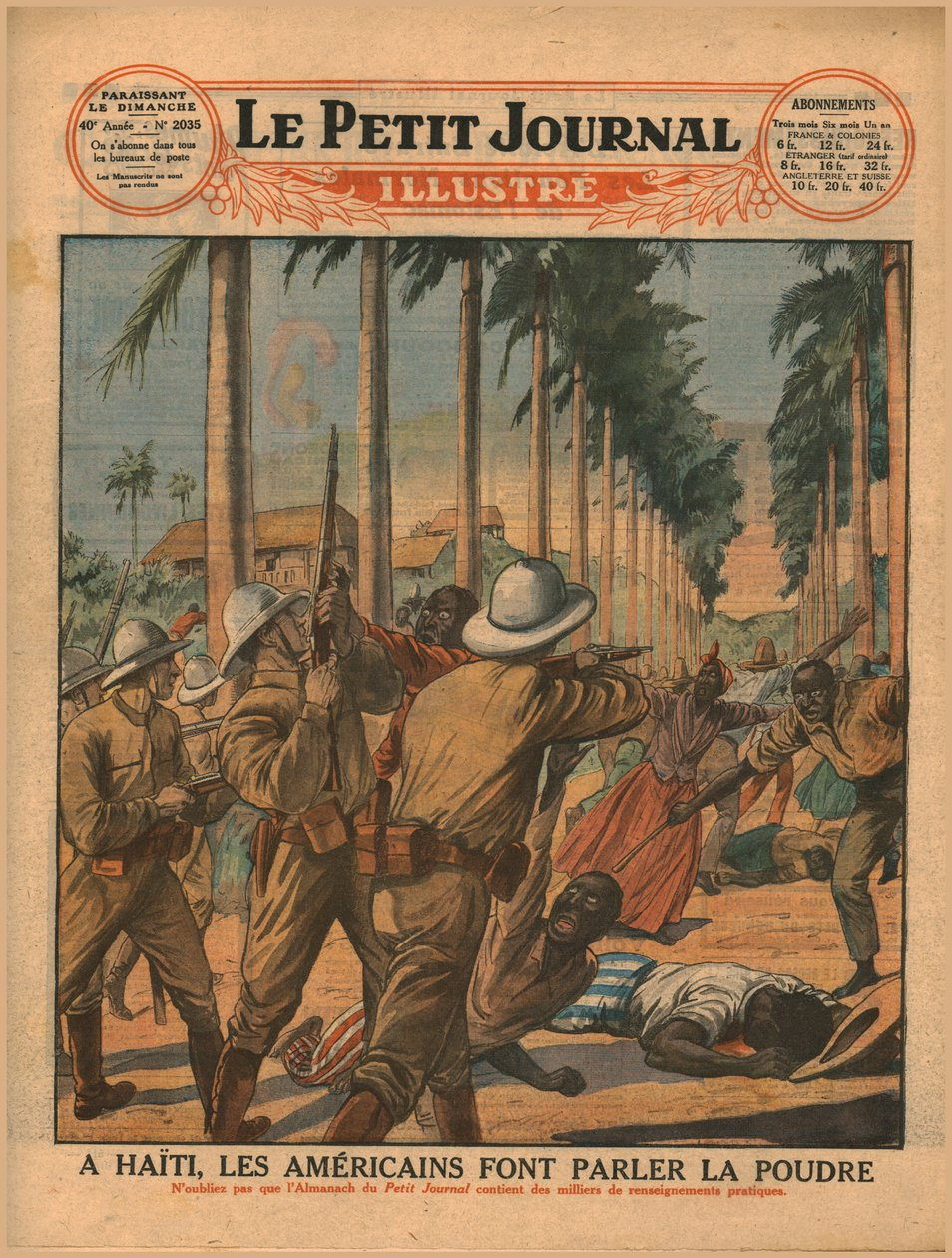
Le Petit Journal illustration of the Les Cayes massacre

President Herbert Hoover had become increasingly pressured about the effects of occupying Haiti at the time and began inquiring about a withdrawal strategy. By 1929, Haitians had grown angered with the Borno-Russell government and American occupation, with demands for direct elections increasing. In early December 1929, protests against the American occupation began at the Service Technique de l'Agriculture et de l'Enseignement Professionnel's main school. On December 6, 1929, about 1,500 Haitians peacefully protesting local economic conditions in Les Cayes were fired upon by US Marines, with the massacre resulting in 12 to 22 Haitians dead and 51 injured. The massacre resulted in international outrage, with Hoover calling on Congress to investigate conditions in Haiti the following day.

==== Forbes Commission, Borno's resignation ====
President Hoover appointed two commissions, including one headed by a former US governor of the Philippines William Cameron Forbes. The commission arrived in Haiti on February 28, 1930, with Hoover demanding the commission to determine "when and how we are to withdraw from Haiti" and "what we shall do in the meantime". The Forbes Commission praised the material improvements that the US administration had achieved, but it criticized the continued exclusion of Haitian nationals from positions of real authority in the government and the Gendarmerie. In more general terms, the commission asserted "the social forces that created [instability] still remain – poverty, ignorance, and the lack of a tradition or desire for orderly free government." The commission concluded that occupation of Haiti was a failure and that the United States did not "understand the social problems of Haiti".

With increased calls for direct elections, American officials feared violence if demands were not met. An agreement was made that resulted with Borno's resignation and the establishment of Haitian banker Louis Eugène Roy as an interim president. In the agreement proposed by the Forbes Commission, Roy would be elected by Congress to serve as president until a direct election for Congress was held, at which time Roy would resign. American officials said that if Congress were to refuse, Roy would be installed as president forcibly.

=== Vincent presidency ===
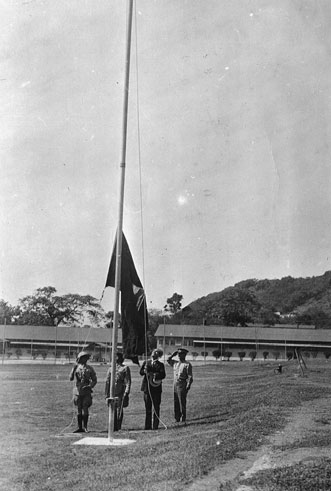
6 August 1934: the Haitian flag is raised in Cap Haïtien at a ceremony marking the formal end of the 20-year United States occupation of Haiti

Under orders to not interfere with elections, the United States observed elections on October 14, 1930, that resulted with Haitian nationalist candidates being elected. Sténio Vincent was elected president by the Congress of Haiti in November 1930. The new nationalist government had a tense relationship with American officials. By the end of 1930, Haitians were being trained by Americans for administration roles of their own nation. When additional American commissions began to arrive in Haiti, popular unrest broke out, and Vincent reached a secret agreement to ease tensions with the United States in exchange to grant more power to American officials to enact their "Haitianization" policies.

Roosevelt, who as Assistant Secretary of the Navy said he that was responsible for drafting the 1918 constitution, was a proponent of the "Good Neighbor policy" for the US role in the Caribbean and Latin America. The United States and Haiti agreed on August 7, 1933, to end the occupation. On a visit to Cap-Haïtien in July 1934, Roosevelt reaffirmed the August 1933 disengagement agreement. The last contingent of US Marines departed on August 15, 1934, after a formal transfer of authority to the Garde. The US retained influence on Haiti's external finances until 1947, as per the 1919 treaty that required an American financial advisor through the life of Haiti's acquired loan.

== Effects ==
=== Economy ===
The occupation was costly for the Haitian government; American advisors collected about 5% of Haiti's revenue while the 1915 treaty with the United States limited Haiti's income, resulting with fewer jobs for the government to assign. Numerous agricultural changes included the introduction of sisal. Sugarcane and cotton became significant exports, boosting prosperity. However, efforts to develop commercial agriculture produced limited results while American agricultural businesses removed the property from thousands of Haitian peasants to produce bananas, sisal and rubber for export, resulting in lower domestic food production.

Haitian traditionalists, based in rural areas, were highly resistant to US-backed changes, while the urban elites, typically mixed-race, welcomed the growing economy but wanted more political control. Following the end of the occupation in 1934, under the presidency of Sténio Vincent (1930–1941), debts were still outstanding and the US financial advisor-general receiver handled the budget until 1941 when three American and three Haitian directors headed by an American manager assumed the role. Haiti's loan debt to the United States was about 20% of the nation's annual revenue.

Formal American influence on Haiti's economy would conclude in 1947. The United Nations and the United States Department of State reported at the time that Haitian rural peasants, who comprised 90% of the nation's population, lived "close to starvation level".

=== Infrastructure ===
The occupation improved some of Haiti's infrastructure and centralized power in Port-au-Prince, though much of the funds collected by the United States was not used to modernize Haiti. Infrastructure improvements included 1,700 kilometres (1,100 mi) of roads being made usable, 189 bridges built, the rehabilitation of irrigation canals, the construction of hospitals, schools, and public buildings, and drinking water was brought to the main cities. Port-au-Prince became the first Caribbean city to have a phone service with automatic dialing. Agricultural education was organized, with a central school of agriculture and 69 farms in the country.

The majority of Haitians believed that the public works projects enforced by the Marines were unsatisfactory. American officers who controlled Haiti at the time spent more on their own salaries than on the public health budget for two million Haitians. A 1949 report by the United States Department of State indicates that irrigation systems that were recently constructed were "not in good condition".

=== Education ===
The United States redesigned the education system. It dismantled the liberal arts education which the Haitians had inherited (and adapted) from the French system. With the Service Technique de l'Agriculture et de l'Enseignement Professionnel, Americans emphasized agricultural and vocational training, similar to its industrial education for minorities and immigrants in the United States. Dr. Robert Russa Moton was tasked with assessing the Service Technique, concluding that though the objectives were admirable, performance was not satisfactory, and he criticized the large amount of funding it received compared to average Haitian public schools, which were in poor condition. Elite Haitians despised the system, believing it was discriminatory against their people. The mulatto elite also feared the creation of an educated middle class that would potentially lead to the loss of their influence.

=== Human rights abuses ===
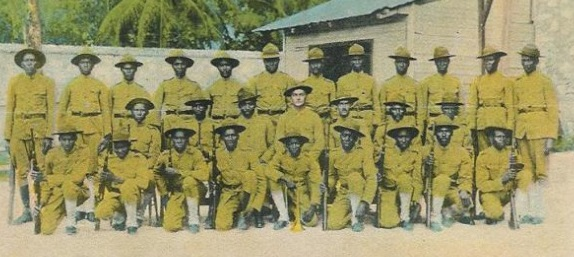
Gendarmerie of Haiti personnel, who were commanded by United States Marines

The Marines ruled Haiti as a military regime using a constant state of martial law, operating the Haitian Gendarmerie to suppress Haitians who opposed occupation. Between 1915 and 1930, Haitians represented only about 35–40% of officers in the gendarmes. Human rights abuses were committed against the native Haitian population. Such actions involved censorship, concentration camps, forced labor, racial segregation, religious persecution of Haitian Vodou practitioners, and torture.

Overall, American troops and the Haitian Gendarmerie killed several thousand Haitian civilians during the rebellions between 1915 and 1920, though the exact death toll is unknown. During Senate hearings in 1921, the commandant of the Marine Corps reported that in the 20 months of active unrest, 2,250 Haitian rebels had been killed. However, in a report to the Secretary of the Navy, he reported the death toll as 3,250. According to Haitian American academic Michel-Rolph Trouillot, about 5,500 Haitians died in labor camps alone. Haitian historian Roger Gaillard estimates that including rebel combatants and civilians, at least 15,000 Haitians were killed throughout the occupation. According to Paul Farmer, the higher estimates are not supported by most historians outside Haiti.

American troops also performed union-busting actions, often for American businesses like the Haitian American Sugar Company, the Haitian American Development Corporation, and National City Bank of New York.

==== Executions and killings ====
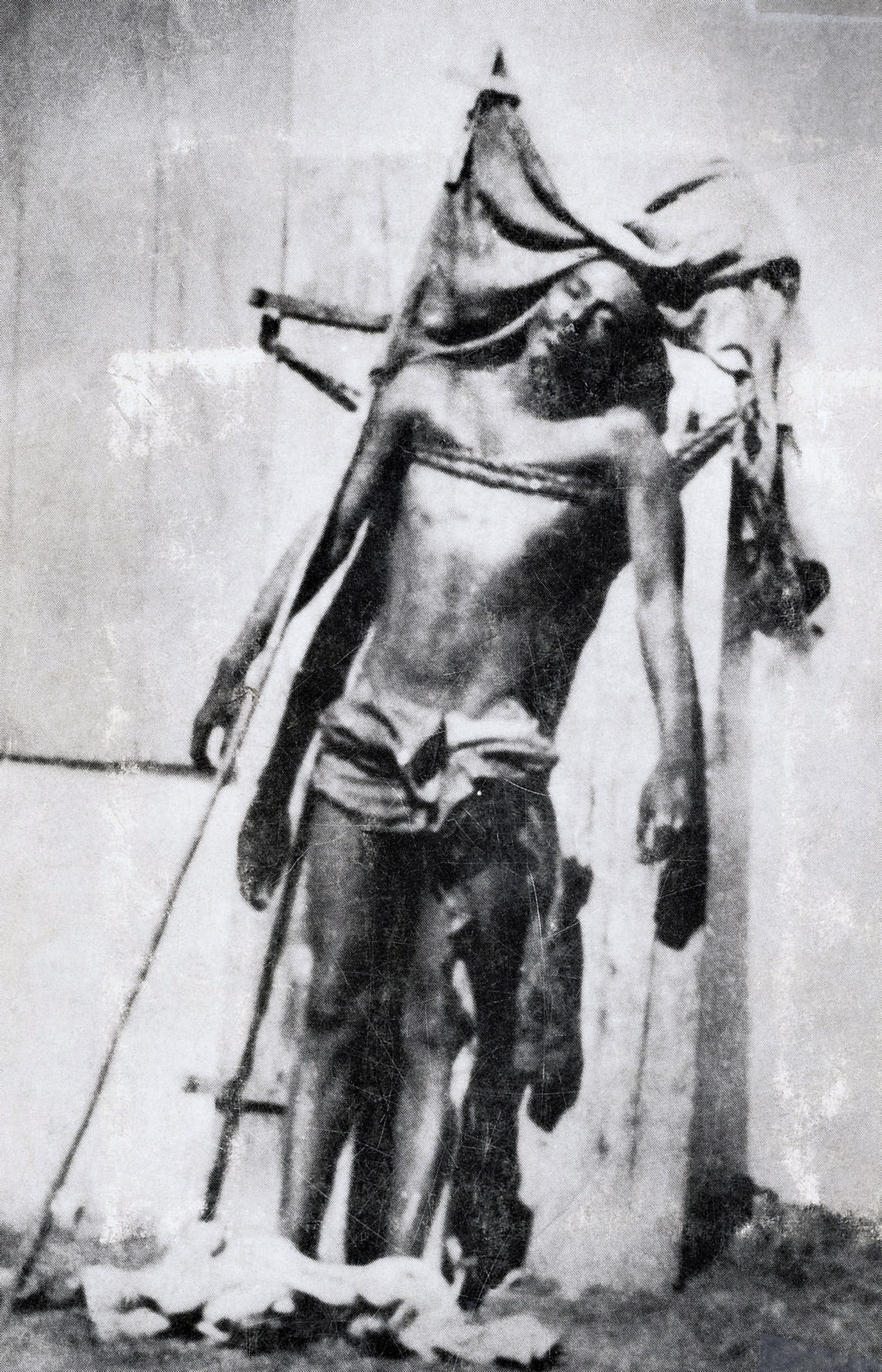
The photograph of Charlemagne Péralte's body distributed by US troops to Haitians

During the Second Caco War, many Caco prisoners were summarily executed by Marines and the Gendarmerie on orders from their superiors. On June 4, 1916, Marines executed Caco General Mizrael Codio and ten others captured in Fonds-Verrettes. In Hinche in January 1919, Captain Ernest Lavoie of the Gendarmerie, a former United States Marine, allegedly ordered the killing of 19 Caco rebels according to American officers, though no charges were placed because no physical evidence was presented. During the investigation of two Marines accused of illegally executing Haitians, the attorney of the Marines minimized their actions, saying that such killings were common, prompting larger investigations into the matter.

One controversial event occurred when in an attempt to discourage rebel support from the Haitian population, the US troops took a photograph of Charlemagne Péralte's body tied to a door following his assassination in 1919 and distributed it in the country. However, it had the opposite effect, with the image's resemblance to a crucifixion making it an icon of the resistance and establishing Péralte as a martyr.

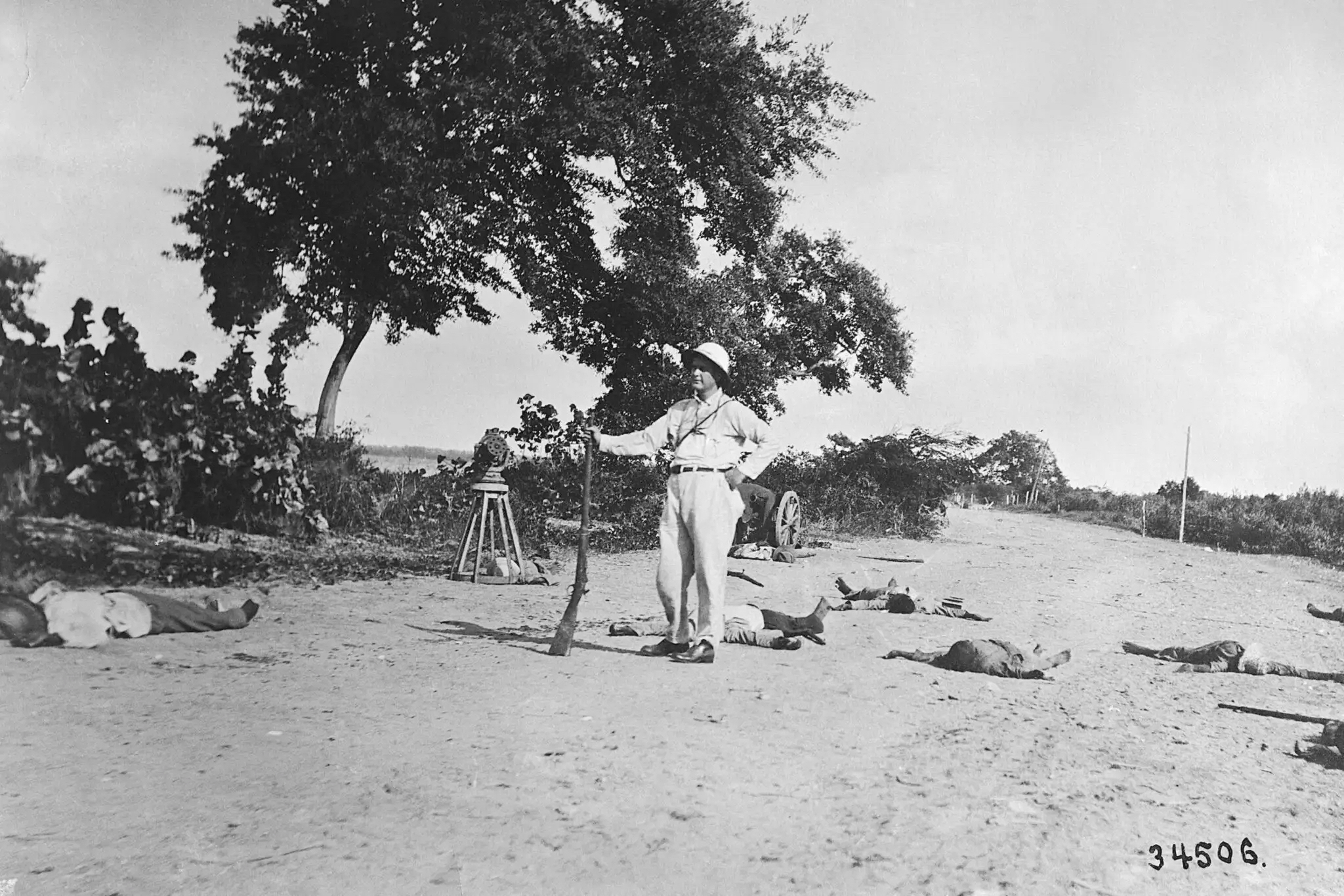
American poses with dead Haitians killed by US Marine machine gun fire on October 11, 1915

Mass killings of civilians were allegedly committed by Marines and the Gendarmerie. According to Haitian historian Roger Gaillard, such killings involved rape, lynchings, summary executions, burning villages and deaths by burning. Internal documents of the United States Army justified the killing of women and children, describing them as "auxiliaries" of rebels. A private memorandum of the Secretary of the Navy criticized "indiscriminate killings against natives". American officers responsible for acts of violence were given names in Creole such as "Linx" for Commandant Freeman Lang and "Ouiliyanm" for Sergeant Dorcas Lee Williams. According to American journalist H. J. Seligman, Marines would practice "bumping off Gooks", describing the shooting of civilians in a similar manner as killing for sport.

Beginning in 1919, American troops began attacking rural villages. In November villagers in Thomazeau hiding in a nearby forest sent a letter – the only surviving testament of the event – to a French priest asking for protection. In the letter, survivors wrote that at least two American planes bombed and shot at two villages, killing half of the population, including men, women, children and the elderly. On December 5 American planes bombed Les Cayes in a possible act of intimidation. American pilots were investigated for their actions, though none was condemned. These actions were described by anthropologist Jean-Philippe Belleau as possibly "the first ever carried out by air on civilian populations".

==== Forced labor ====
A corvée policy enacted upon Haitians was enforced by the Gendarmerie in the interest of improving economic conditions to fulfill foreign debts – including payments to the United States – and to improve the nation's infrastructure. The corvée system was found in Haiti's rural code by Major Smedley D. Butler, who testified that forced labor cut the cost of 1 mile (1.6 km) of road construction from $51,000 per mile to $205 per mile.

The corvée resulted in the deaths of hundreds to thousands of Haitians. Haitians were tied together in rope, and those fleeing labor projects were often shot. Roger Gaillard writes that some Haitians were killed fleeing the camps or if they did not work satisfactorily. Many of the deaths and killings attributed to forced labor occurred during the extensive construction of roads in Haiti. In some instances, Haitians were forced to work on projects without pay and while shackled to chains. The corvée system's treatment of Haitians has been compared to the system of bondage labor enforced upon black Americans during the Reconstruction era following the American Civil War.

==== Racism ====
Many of those tasked with the occupation of Haiti espoused racist beliefs. The first Marine commander assigned was Colonel Littleton Waller, who had a history of racism against mulattos, describing them as "real nigger ... real nigs beneath the surface." Secretary of State Robert Lansing also held racist beliefs, writing that "the African race are devoid of any capacity for political organization." The US introduced Jim Crow laws to Haiti, and racist attitudes towards Haitians by the occupation forces that were blatant and widespread. Many of the Marines chosen to occupy Haiti were from the Southern United States, specifically Alabama and Louisiana, resulting in increased racial tensions. Racism has been recognized as a factor leading to increased violence by U.S. troops against Haitian civilians. One general described Haitians as "niggers who pretend to speak French."

Initially, US officers and Haitian elites intermingled at social gatherings and clubs. Such gatherings were minimized when families of US troops began arriving. Relations degraded rapidly upon departure of officers for World War I. The Haitian elites found the American junior and non-commissioned officers to be ignorant and uneducated. There were numerous reports of Marines drinking to excess, fighting, and sexually assaulting women. The situation was so bad that Marine General John A. Lejeune, based in Washington, D.C., banned the sale of alcohol to any military personnel.

The Americans inhabited neighborhoods of Port-au-Prince in high-quality housing, in a neighborhood that was called the "millionaires' row." Hans Schmidt recounted a Navy officer's opinion on the matter of segregation: "I can't see why they wouldn't have a better time with their crowd, just as I do with mine." American racial intolerance provoked indignation and resentment, and eventually a racial pride was reflected in the work of a new generation of Haitian historians, ethnologists, writers, artists and others. Many of these later became active in politics and government. The elite Haitians, mostly mixed-race with higher levels of education and capital, continued to dominate the country's bureaucracy and to strengthen its role in national affairs.

Colorism, which had existed since French colonization, became prevalent under U.S. occupation, and racial segregation became common. All three rulers during the occupation came from the country's mixed-race elite. At the same time, many in the growing black professional classes departed from the traditional veneration of Haiti's French cultural heritage and emphasized the nation's African roots. Among these were ethnologist Jean Price-Mars and François Duvalier, editor of the journal Les Griots (the title referred to traditional African oral historians, the storytellers) and future totalitarian president of Haiti. The racism and violence that occurred during the occupation inspired black nationalism among Haitians and left a powerful impression on the young Duvalier.

==== Torture ====
The torture of Haitian rebels or those suspected of rebelling against the United States was common among occupying Marines. Some methods of torture included the use of water cure, hanging prisoners by their genitals, and ceps, which involved pushing both sides of the tibia with the butts of two guns.

== Analysis ==
=== 20th century ===
Haitian writers and public figures also responded to the occupation. For example, a minister of public education, Dantès Bellegarde raised issues with the events in his book, La Résistance Haïtienne (l'Occupation Américaine d'Haïti). Bellegarde outlines the contradictions of the occupation with the realities. He accused President Wilson of writing the new Haitian constitution to benefit the Americans, and wrote that Wilson's main purpose was to remove the previous Haitian clause that stated foreigners could not own land in the country. The original clause was designed to protect Haiti's independence from foreign powers. Furthermore, Bellegarde discusses the powerlessness of Haitian officials in the eyes of the occupation because nothing could be done without the consent of the Americans. However, the main issue that Bellegarde articulates is that the Americans tried to change the education system of Haiti from one that was French based to that of the Americans. Even though Bellegarde was resistant, he had a plan to build a university in Haiti that was based on the American system. He wanted a university with various schools of science, business, art, medicine, law, agriculture, and languages all connected by a common area and library. However, that dream was never realized because of the new direction the Haitian government was forced to take.

Jean Price-Mars associated the reasons behind the occupation to the division between the Haitian elite and the poorer people of the country. He noted that the groups were divided over the practice of Haitian Vodou, with the implication that the elites did not recognize Vodou because they connected it to an evil practice.

=== 21st century ===
Pezullo writes in his 2006 book Plunging Into Haiti: Clinton, Aristide, and the Defeat of Diplomacy that the racism similar to Jim Crow laws in the United States inspired black nationalism within Haiti and ignited future support for Haitian dictator François Duvalier.

In a 2013 article by Peter James Hudson published in Radical History Review, Hudson writes:

Ostensibly initiated on humane grounds, the occupation had not fulfilled any of its stated goals of building infrastructure, expanding education, or providing internal or regional stability. Repressive violence emerged as its only purpose and logic.

Hudson further states that the motives of American businessmen to become involved in Haiti were racial capitalism motivated by white supremacy. According to a 2020 study which contrasts the American occupations of both Haiti and the Dominican Republic, the United States had a longer and more domineering occupation of Haiti because of perceived racial differences between the two populations. Dominican elites articulated a European–Spanish identity – in contrast to Haitian blackness – which led US policymakers to accept leaving the territory in the population's hands.

== See also ==
- History of Haiti
- Banana Wars
- United States occupation of the Dominican Republic (1916–1924)
- Haiti during World War I
- Foreign interventions by the United States
- Foreign policy of the United States
- Foreign relations of the United States
- Latin America–United States relations
- United States involvement in regime change
- List of United States invasions of Latin American countries
