= Rosalvo Bobo =

Haitian anti-American politician and rebel leader

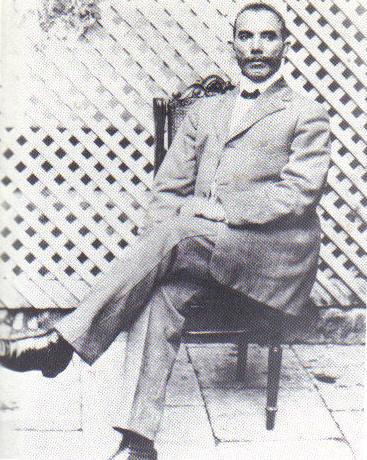
Rosalvo Bobo

Dr. Pierre François Joseph Benoit Rosalvo Bobo (1874–1929), known as Rosalvo Bobo, was a Haitian politician, and a leader of the rebel faction called the Cacos. In March of 1915, he started and led a rebellion against the government of President Vilbrun Guillaume Sam. As the rebellion was gaining momentum, Sam ordered the arrest and murder of his political opponents, but was himself killed by a mob in retaliation on 27 July 1915. This led to a breakdown of order and widespread violence in the capital of Port-au-Prince. In response, U.S. Marines landed at Port-au-Prince on 28 July 1915, beginning the United States occupation of Haiti.

U.S. Admiral William Banks Caperton commanded U.S. troops occupying Haiti after the assassination of President Sam. Under orders from Washington, D.C., he sought to find a suitable candidate to assume the presidency. Two names emerged, Bobo and Philippe Sudré Dartiguenave. After interviewing both men, Caperton formed the opinion that Bobo was mentally unstable and unfit for office. He informed Washington of this and was told by assistant secretary of the Navy Franklin D. Roosevelt that "the election of Dartiguenave is preferred by the United States". After losing the election in the Haitian Senate by a vote of 94 to 3, Bobo fled to Cuba, but then moved to Jamaica. He finally settled in France, where he died in 1929.
