= USS Caperton =

Fletcher-class destroyer

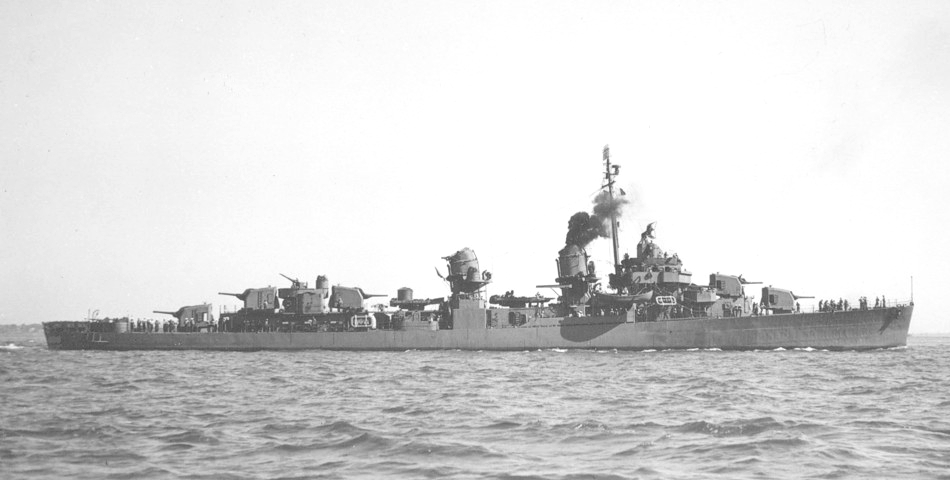
- USS Caperton (DD-650) off Boston in 1943

History

United States
- Namesake: William B. Caperton
- Builder: Bath Iron Works
- Laid down: 11 January 1943
- Launched: 22 May 1943
- Commissioned: 30 July 1943
- Decommissioned: 27 April 1960
- Stricken: 1 December 1974
- Fate: Sunk as a target in the 1980s

General characteristics
- Class & type: Fletcher-class destroyer
- Displacement: 2,050 tons
- Length: 376 ft 6 in (114.7 m)
- Beam: 39 ft 8 in (12.1 m)
- Draft: 17 ft 9 in (5.4 m)
- Propulsion: 60,000 shp (45 MW); 2 propellers
- Speed: 35 knots (65 km/h; 40 mph)
- Range: 6500 nm at 15 kn; (12,000 km at 28 km/h)
- Complement: 319
- Armament: 5 × 5-inch 38 caliber guns, 10 × 40 mm AA guns, 7 × 20 mm AA guns, 10 × 21 inch (533 mm) torpedo tubes, 6 × depth charge projectors, 2 × depth charge tracks

USS Caperton (DD-650) was a Fletcher-class destroyer of the United States Navy, named for Admiral William B. Caperton (1850–1941).

Caperton was launched 22 May 1943 by Bath Iron Works, Bath, Maine, sponsored by Miss M. Caperton; and commissioned 30 July 1943.

== Service history ==
Caperton sailed from Boston 8 October 1943 for Pearl Harbor, where she arrived 6 November to begin the operations which would stamp her as one of the "fightingest" destroyers of the Pacific theater. After delivering explosives at Funafuti, Ellice Islands, 28–29 November, the destroyer covered the Gilbert Islands through patrol until 8 January 1944, when she put back to Pearl Harbor. Here she joined the screen of the mighty Fast Carrier Task Force, with which she steamed in the intensive series of operations which marked the advance of the Navy across the Pacific. (Then 5th Fleet's Task Force 58, later 3rd Fleet's TF 38.) On 30 January 1944, Caperton joined in the bombardment of Kwajalein, and from her base at Majuro, took part in the air strikes on Truk and Saipan in February.

Caperton cleared Espiritu Santo 15 March 1944 for the air operations covering the invasion of Emirau Island, then sailed for the stunning blows hurled from the air at the Japanese on Palau, Yap, Woleai, and Ulithi late in March. Tireless TF 58 continued the crescendo pace of its attacks, and in April Caperton screened air strikes preparatory to the invasion of Hollandia, saw the force's planes hit Truk once more, and blasted at Satawan and Ponape in shore bombardment.

On 6 June 1944, Caperton sortied from Majuro for the Marianas operation, which culminated in the fury of the Battle of the Philippine Sea on 19 and 20 June. Screening the American carriers as they launched the strikes which would cripple Japanese naval aviation, Caperton interposed her blazing antiaircraft fire between enemy air attacks and the carriers. Moving on to cover the attacks preparatory to the return of United States forces to Guam, Caperton sailed close inshore to provide lifeguard services for carrier strikes, and on 25 June braved the fire of enemy shore batteries to shell and sink a cargo ship in Apra Harbor. Through July, she operated in the Marianas, and late in the month screened air strikes on Yap and Palau.

Caperton got underway from Eniwetok 30 August 1944 to rendezvous with TF 38 for the well-planned bombardments and air strikes which paved the way for the return to the Philippines. The Palaus, Mindanao, Visayas, and Luzon were blasted from the air, while Peleliu, Angaur, and the Ngesebus felt the might of the force's guns. The destroyer replenished at Ulithi, and resumed screening duty for the strikes intended to deny the Japanese the use of their bases on Okinawa and Formosa in the forthcoming Leyte invasion. In the 3-day Formosa air battle which resulted, Canberra and Houston were torpedoed from the air. Caperton was assigned to screen the cripples to safety, and to guard them while they were used as bait in the effort to bring the Japanese surface units into battle. When the stricken cruisers were safely out of range of enemy air attack, Caperton returned to screen TF 38 in the air strikes of the decisive Battle of Leyte Gulf, which developed from the all-out efforts of the Japanese to break up the Leyte landings. Strikes flown from the carriers of Caperton's group inflicted the final losses on the Japanese Center Force, and she with others pursued the retreating Japanese north, without making surface contact.

Continued operations supporting the invasion of the Philippines kept Caperton at sea from her base at Ulithi. When Reno was torpedoed on 4 November 1944, Caperton took her injured and other survivors on board, and after weathering the furious typhoon of 18 December, she steamed for air strikes on Formosa, Luzon, Cam Ranh Bay, Hong Kong, Canton, and Okinawa.

An overhaul on the west coast prepared the destroyer for picket duty off Okinawa through May and June 1945. The desperate Japanese suicide air attacks made radar picket duty off embattled Okinawa one of the most dangerous duties of the war, but Caperton served her tour unscathed; constantly vigilant both to protect herself and provide for effective use of her radar warning equipment.

On 29 June 1945, Caperton rejoined TF 38 for the final air strikes on the Japanese home islands, which continued until the close of the war. After several months of occupation duty at Tokyo, Caperton returned to the east coast of the United States, where she was decommissioned at Charleston, South Carolina, 6 July 1946.

The battle-tried veteran was recommissioned 6 April 1951, as the fleet was augmented to meet the threat posed by the Korean War. With Newport as her home port, Caperton operated locally until the fall of 1952, when she sailed to northern Europe for North Atlantic Treaty Organization (NATO) Operation Mainbrace. After preparing by fleet exercises in the Caribbean early in 1953, Caperton cleared Newport 27 April for the Panama Canal and duty in the Far East, arriving at Yokosuka, Japan 2 June for duty with TFs 77 and 95. With the first, she screened air strikes on Chinese and North Korean Communists; with the second, she took part in the blockade and bombardment of Korea's coast. After further hunter-killer operations off Korea, she sailed on 9 October to call at the Philippines, Singapore, Colombo, Suez, Cannes, and Lisbon, thus rounding the world before her return to Newport 21 May 1954.

Five months of operations with North Atlantic Treaty Organization forces in northern Europe in 1954, and a good-will visit to Guayaquil, Ecuador, in 1955 highlighted a period of local operations and training which preceded Caperton's patrol operations in the Atlantic during the Suez Crisis of November 1956. On 21 January 1957, Caperton sailed for a tour of duty with the 6th Fleet in the Mediterranean during which she sailed with the carrier striking force in the eastern Mediterranean during the Jordan crisis. Returning to Newport in June, the destroyer's next lengthy deployment was her participation from 3 September to 27 November in NATO Exercise Strikeback in the North Atlantic and Mediterranean. Operations off the east coast, in the Caribbean, with the 6th Fleet in the Mediterranean (including visits to Red Sea and Persian Gulf ports), and combined operations with Canadian forces continued through 1959. Caperton was placed out of commission in reserve at Norfolk, Virginia, on 27 April 1960.

== Awards ==
Caperton received 10 battle stars for World War II service, and 1 for service in the Korean War.
