= Haitian–American Convention =

1915 treaty between Haiti and the United States

The Haitian–American Convention was a treaty between those two nations, ratified by the United States Senate on 16 September 1915 (following the United States occupation of Haiti earlier that year) which granted the United States the right to provide security in and administer the finances of Haiti for a period of 10 years.
