= Vilbrun Guillaume Sam =

President of Haiti (1859–1915)

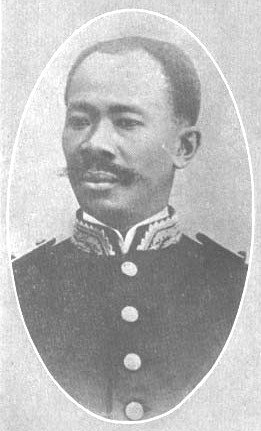

24th President of Haiti
- In office 25 February 1915 – 28 July 1915
- Preceded by: Joseph Davilmar Théodore
- Succeeded by: Philippe Sudré Dartiguenave

Minister of War and Navy
- In office 13 December 1897 – 12 March 1902
- President: Tirésias Simon Sam
- Preceded by: Septimus Marius
- Succeeded by: Pierre Nord Alexis

Personal details
- Born: Jean Simon Guillaume; 4 March 1859 Ouanaminthe, Haiti
- Died: 28 July 1915 (aged 56) Port-au-Prince, Haiti
- Party: National Party
- Spouse: Lucie Parisien
- Profession: Military officer

Jean Vilbrun Guillaume Sam (French pronunciation: [ʒɑ̃ vilbʁœ̃ ɡijom sam]; 4 March 1859 – 28 July 1915) was President of Haiti from 4 March 1915 until his assassination months later. He was the son of Tirésias Simon Sam, Haiti's president from 1896 to 1902.

== Career ==
Sam was the commander of Haiti's Northern Division when he led the revolt which brought President Cincinnatus Leconte to power. He later headed the revolt which toppled President Oreste Zamor. On 25 February 1915 Sam was proclaimed president when his predecessor, Joseph Davilmar Théodore, was forced to resign, because he was unable to pay the militiamen, known as the "Cacos", who had helped him overthrow Zamor.

As Haiti's fifth president in five turbulent years, Sam was forced to contend with a revolt against his own regime, led by Dr. Rosalvo Bobo, who opposed the government's expanded commercial and strategic ties with the United States. Fearing that he would share the same fate as his predecessors, Sam acted harshly against his political opponents, particularly the better-educated and wealthier mulatto population. On 27 July 1915, his repression culminated in his ordering the execution of 167 political prisoners—including former president Zamor, who was being held in a Port-au-Prince jail. This infuriated the Haitian people, who rose up against Sam's government as soon as news of these executions reached them.

== Assassination ==
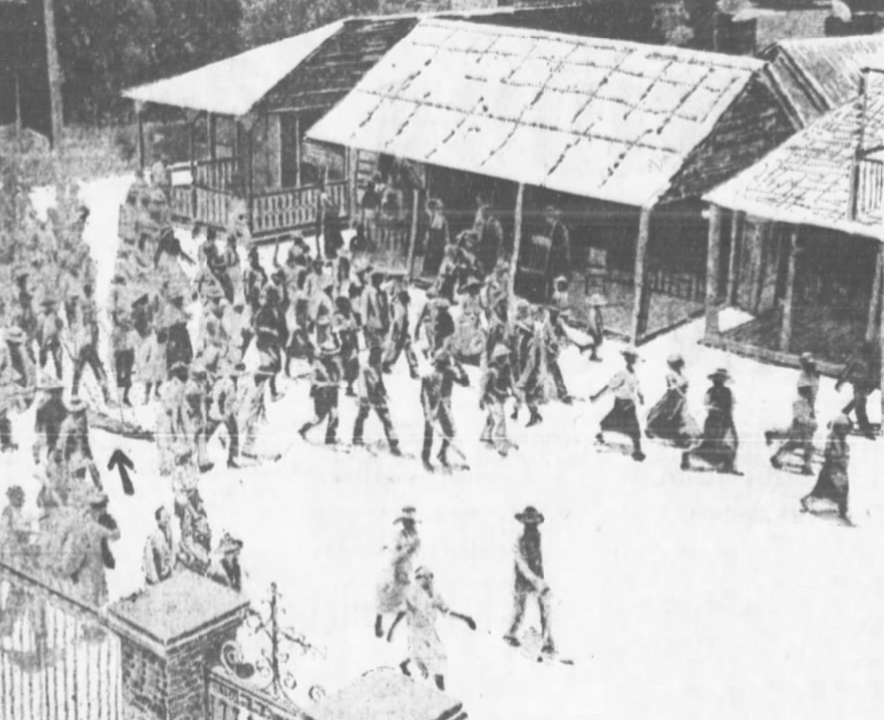
Sam's body surrounded by a mob on a street in Port-au-Prince after his assassination

Sam fled to the French embassy, where he received asylum. The rebels' mulatto leaders broke into the embassy and found Sam. According to Major General Smedley D. Butler, a commander of a US detachment of Marines present in Haiti at the time, the revolution resulting in Sam's deposition came "to a head before the army came in from Arcahaie" to intervene in the president's defense. In a testimony to the United States Congress, Butler described how Sam was thrown from the embassy "into the street, where he was cut up into 200 pieces and dragged around the streets on pieces of string, what was left of his body."

== Legacy ==
For the next two weeks, the country was in chaos. News of the murder soon reached the American Navy ships anchored in the city's harbor. President Woodrow Wilson, who was wary about the turn of events in Haiti, and especially the possibility that Bobo would take power, ordered American troops to seize the capital. They landed on 28 July 1915, and continued to occupy the country for nineteen years, until August 1934.

Sam's chief of police, Charles Oscar Étienne, who cleaned out the jails by executing his political opponents, inspired the boogeymen Haitian carnival disguises known as "Chaloska".

== In literature and the arts ==
Eugene O'Neill stated that Sam was the inspiration for his 1920 play The Emperor Jones.

Sam is the main figure in Arthur J. Burks's short story "Thus Spake the Prophetess" (Weird Tales, November 1924).

Sam appears as a supporting character in the 1993 Doctor Who novel White Darkness which is set during his presidency. The novel takes several liberties with history, having Sam committing suicide rather than being murdered by the rebels as was actually the case.
