= Philippe Sudré Dartiguenave =

25th President of Haiti from 1915 to 1922

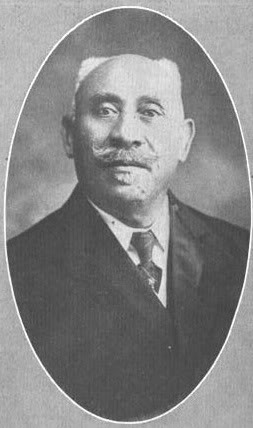

25th President of Haiti
- In office 12 August 1915 – 15 May 1922
- Preceded by: Jean Vilbrun Guillaume Sam
- Succeeded by: Louis Borno

Personal details
- Born: 6 April 1863 Anse-à-Veau, Haiti
- Died: 26 July 1926 (aged 63) Anse-à-Veau, Haiti
- Party: Independent
- Spouse(s): Marie Luce Pierre-Jacques; Lunicia Maignan
- Profession: Lawyer

Philippe Sudré Dartiguenave (French pronunciation: [filip sydʁe daʁtiɡnav]; 6 April 1863 – 26 July 1926) was a Haitian political figure. He served as president of Haiti from 12 August 1915 to 15 May 1922, during the U.S. military occupation that had begun on 27 July 1915.

U.S. Admiral William B. Caperton was the commander of the American occupation troops in Haiti after the assassination of President Jean Vilbrun Guillaume Sam. Civil order in Haiti had completely broken down and Caperton was ordered by Washington DC to find a suitable candidate for the presidency. Two names emerged, Rosalvo Bobo, who was the leader of an ongoing rebellion against the Guillaume Sam government, and Dartiguenave, then president of the Haitian Senate. After interviewing both men Caperton formed the opinion that Bobo was mentally unstable and unfit for any office. He informed Washington of this and was told by then- Assistant Secretary of the Navy, Franklin D. Roosevelt that "the election of Dartiguenave is preferred by the United States". Dartiguenave won the election in the Haitian Senate by a vote of 94 to 3 and was inaugurated on 12 August 1915.

== Biography ==
Dartiguenave was a mulatto, born on 6 April 1863. Dartiguenave served as the President of the Senate of Haiti in 1910s. Throughout his career, Dartiguenave never affiliated with any political party. He served as President of Haïti from 12 August 1915 to 15 May 1922 in a government set up by the United States after its military occupation began on 27 July 1915 following an uprising which resulted in the death of President Vilbrun Guillaume Sam. He died on 26 July 1926.

Political offices
Preceded by Jean Vilbrun Guillaume Sam	President of Haïti; 1915–1922	Succeeded by Louis Borno
