= William Banks Caperton =

United States Navy admiral

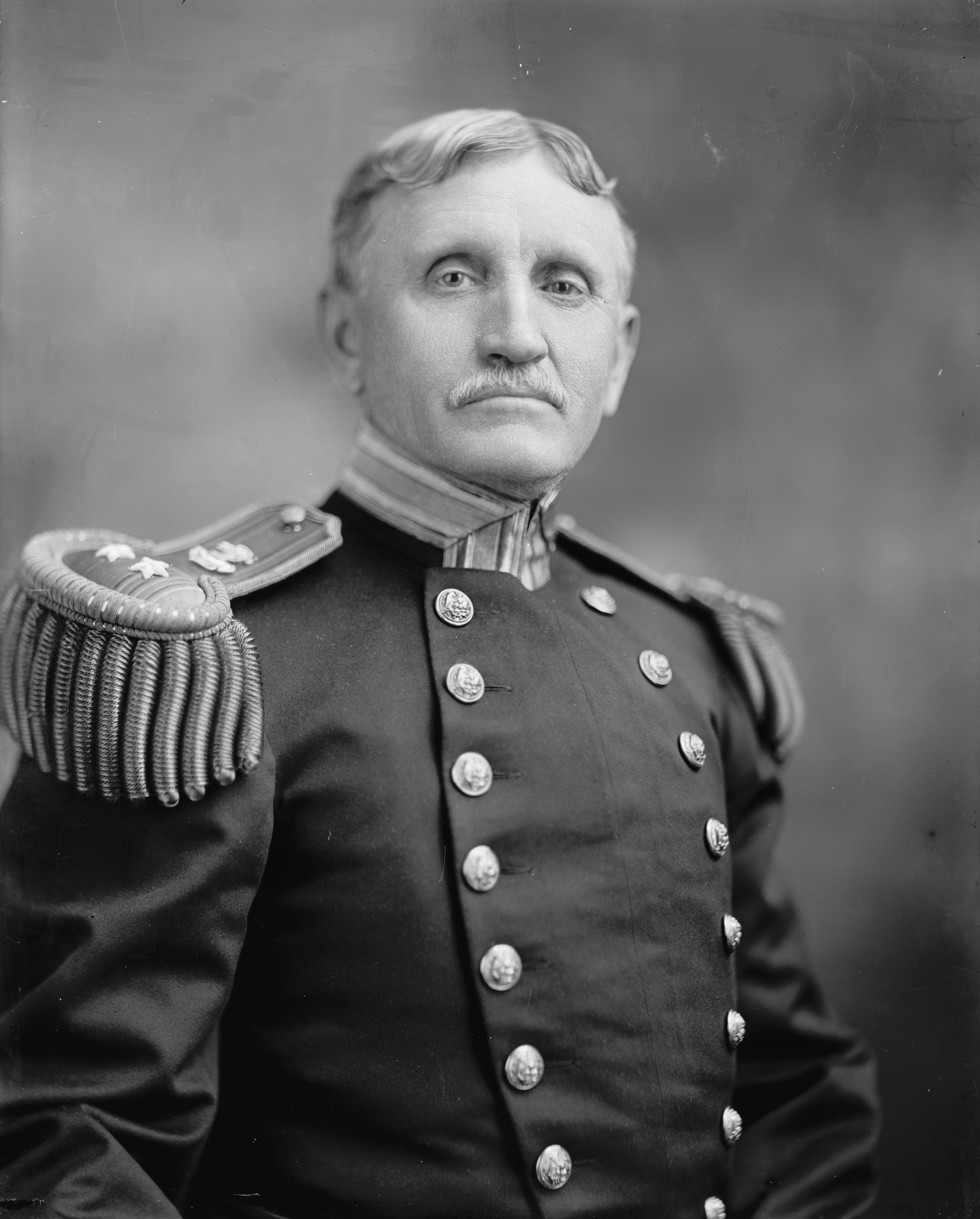
- Caperton c. 1914
- Born: June 30, 1855; Spring Hill, Tennessee, US
- Died: December 21, 1941 (aged 86); Newport, Rhode Island, US
- Burial place: Arlington National Cemetery
- Relatives: Georgie W. Langhorne Blacklocke
- Military career
- Allegiance: United States of America
- Branch: United States Navy
- Service years: 1875–1921
- Rank: Admiral
- Commands: US Pacific Fleet
- Conflicts: Spanish–American War; World War I
- Awards: Navy Distinguished Service Medal

William Banks Caperton (June 30, 1855 – December 21, 1941) was an admiral of the United States Navy. He held major posts ashore and afloat, chief of which were commanding the naval forces intervening in Haiti (1915–16) and Santo Domingo (1916), and Commander-in-Chief, Pacific Fleet, from July 28, 1916, to April 30, 1919. He served actively until November 12, 1921.

== Biography ==
He was born on June 30, 1855, in Spring Hill, Tennessee and entered the United States Naval Academy in 1871. Following graduation from the Naval Academy in September 1875, Caperton served at sea for five years, with duty aboard USS Powhatan, USS Constellation, and USS Tennessee. He had three years' service with the United States Coast and Geodetic Survey, after which he joined USS Ossipee for service on the Asiatic Station. In April 1887, he assumed duty as Inspector of Steel at Pittsburgh, Pennsylvania, and in November of the following year transferred to Washington, D.C., for duty as Secretary of the Steel Inspection Board. He next had brief duty in the summer of 1891 as Recorder of the Examining Board at Norfolk, Virginia.

Admiral William B. Caperton

Caperton had three years' consecutive sea duty aboard USS Miantonomoh, USS Vesuvius, and USS Essex. On February 21, 1895, he reported to the Office of Naval Intelligence, Navy Department, Washington, D.C., and following three months' duty in that office, he had instruction at the Naval War College, Newport, Rhode Island, completing the course there on October 15, 1896. Next followed consecutive service aboard USS Brooklyn and during the Spanish–American War period aboard USS Marietta, with service as executive officer of that vessel after the peace protocol was signed on August 12, 1898, and until October 16, 1899.

Returning to the United States, Caperton reported for duty as Inspector of Ordinance at the Navy Yard, Washington, D.C., to serve from December 1899 until July 1901, when he was ordered to duty in connection with the fitting out of USS Prairie. He served as her executive officer from her commissioning, August 8, 1901, until May 1904, when he was again ordered to the Naval War College, Newport, Rhode Island. Completing the course of instruction in October of that year, he became Inspector of the 15th Light House District at St. Louis, Missouri, and served in that capacity until April 15, 1907.

He assumed command of USS Denver on April 20, 1907, and transferred his command to USS Maine (BB-10) on July 31, 1908. Detached from that command when the Maine was decommissioned on August 31, 1909, he proceeded to Washington, D.C. He thereafter became Secretary of the Light House Board, Department of Commerce and Labor, on October 11, 1909, and served in that assignment until June 30, 1910, when he was ordered to duty in attendance upon the summer conference of officers at the Naval War College, Newport, Rhode Island. Upon completion of the conference he returned to Washington, D.C., where he was assigned duty as member of the Naval Examining and Naval Retiring Boards.

Following duty as commandant of the Naval Station, Narragansett Bay, Rhode Island, from May 1912 until October 1913, during which period he was promoted to the rank of rear admiral, Caperton became Commander in Chief, Atlantic Reserve Fleet, USS Alabama flagship, and after a year's service in that command, he assumed command in November 1914 of Cruiser Squadron, Atlantic Fleet, USS Washington flagship. During the period of this assignment, and transferring his flag to Tennessee and later to Dolphin, he commanded the Naval Forces that intervened at Haiti in 1915–1916; was Commander Naval Forces, Vera Cruz, in 1915; and commanded Naval Forces intervening and suppressing the Santo Domingo Revolution in 1916.

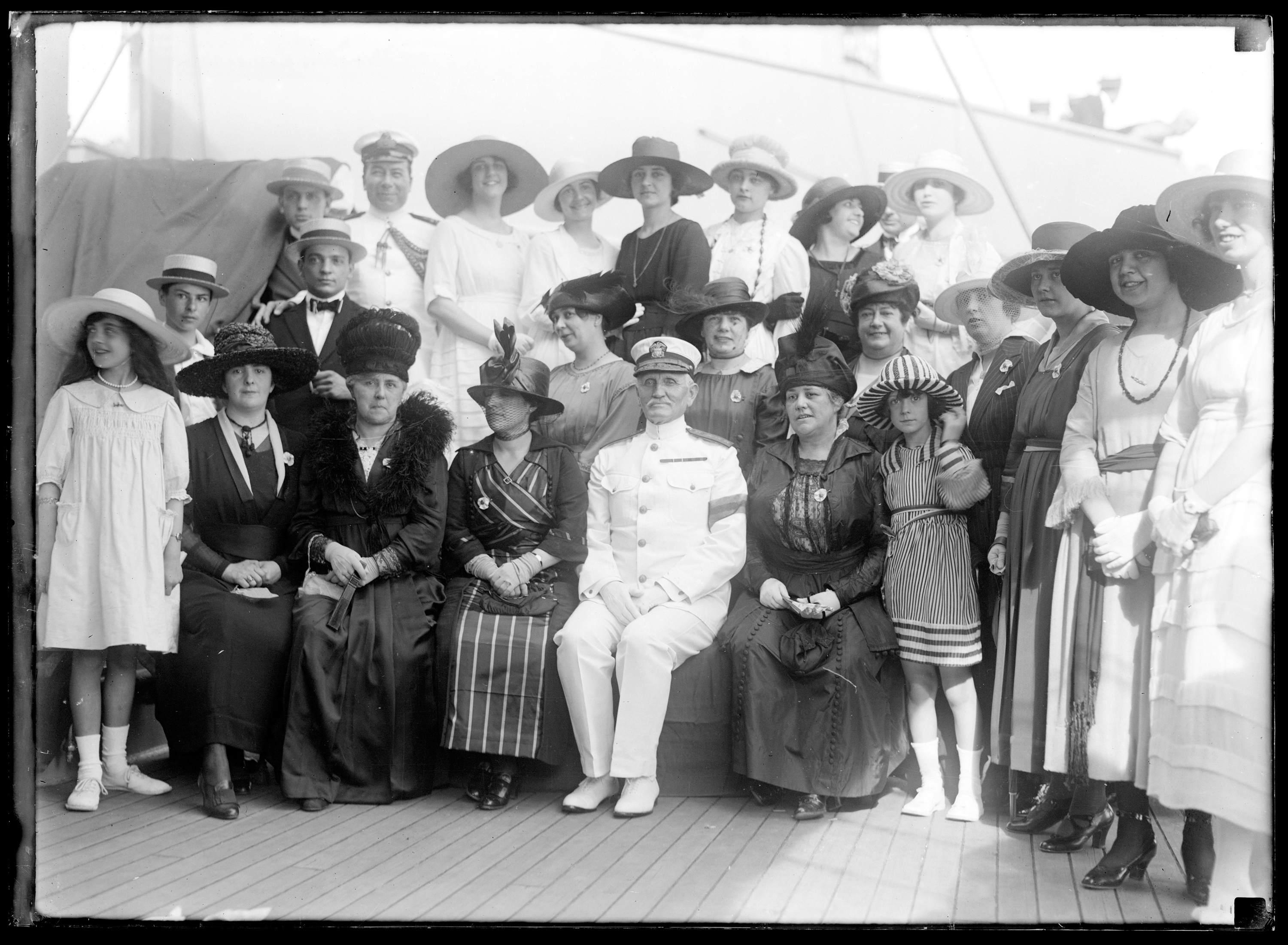
Reception to Admiral William Caperton (center) during his arrival at the port of Montevideo in 1917.

Relieved of command of Cruiser Force, Atlantic Fleet, he returned to the United States, reporting to Key West, Florida. Upon designation as Commander in Chief, Pacific Fleet, by the President of the United States on July 22, 1916, he proceeded to San Diego, California, to assume his new duties in the rank of admiral, and hoisted his flag in USS Pittsburgh. He was in charge of the patrol of the East Coast of South America which cleared southern waters of German raiders during World War I and he greatly aided in the development of goodwill between the United States and her Allies. For his services as Commander in Chief of the Pacific Fleet during World War I, he was awarded the Distinguished Service Medal with citation as follows:

For exceptionally meritorious service in a duty of great responsibility as Commander-in-Chief of the Pacific Fleet on the East Coast of South America in establishing friendly diplomatic relations with the countries of South America.

On November 1, 1918, ten days before the signing of the Armistice which officially closed hostilities between Germany and the United States, Admiral Caperton was designated by the President of the United States as Special Representative with the rank of Ambassador Extraordinary and Plenipotentiary to attend the ceremonies at Rio de Janeiro on November 15, 1918, incident to the inauguration of Rodrigues Alves as President of the Republic of Brazil. He was also Special Naval Delegate at the inauguration of Baltasar Brum as President of Uruguay in 1919. Detached from command of the Pacific Fleet in April 1919, he reported for duty in the Office of Naval Operations, Navy Department, Washington, D.C.

On April 12, 1919, Franklin D. Roosevelt shed by Admiral Caperton, he will be released from present duty on April 30, and, pending his retirement June 30, he will be detailed to prepare a complete and detailed memorandum of his duty since being ordered to sea duty in 1915 with special reference to what he has been connected with since war was declared. This memorandum will be turned over to the historical section of the Navy. Admiral Caperton's duty since war was declared, above referred to, has been the commanding officer of the Pacific Fleet which, in conjunction with British and French fleets, cleared the Southern Atlantic of German raiders and patrolled the east coast of South America. On his flagship, USS Pittsburgh, Admiral Caperton made courtesy visits to South American republics during the war and since the Armistice was signed. His visits were of inestimable value, as they strengthened the bonds of friendship between South American republics and the United States and promoted solidarity of relations between these countries and the Allies. Admiral Caperton was put in command of the cruiser force of the Atlantic Fleet on November 21, 1914. He has been in command of the Pacific Fleet since May 22, 1917, on which date original orders of June 7, 1916, were amended.

Admiral Caperton was transferred to the Retired List in the rank of rear admiral on June 30, 1919, but continued on active duty in connection with the official reception of the President Elect of Brazil, and as Naval Aide to Dr. Pessoa during his visit to the United States, and return. Upon completion of this temporary duty, he was ordered for further temporary duty in the Office of the Chief of Naval Operations, and later as witness before Senate Committee on Occupation and Administration of Territories of Haitian Republic by American Forces. Relieved of all active duty, he proceeded home in November 1921. He was commissioned admiral on the Retired List of the Navy from June 21, 1930 (Act of June 21, 1930).

In addition to the Distinguished Service Medal, Admiral Caperton had the Spanish Campaign Medal (1898); the Cuba Pacification Medal; the Mexican Service Medal (USS Washington, 1915); the Dominican Campaign Medal (USS Dolphin, 1916); and the World War I Victory Medal, Patrol Clasp, (USS Pittsburgh), for World War I Service. He also had the following foreign decorations: Order of the Bust of Bolivar, Third Class, by the Government of Venezuela; and the Grand Official da Ordem do Cruizeiro do Sul, by the Brazilian Government.

Admiral Caperton was a founder and honorary member of the Military Order of Foreign Wars of the United States (European Commandry, Paris, 1927); an honorary life member of the Military Order of Foreign Wars of the United States (Commanding General 1914–1917); and a member of the Military Order of the World Wars and the Retired Officers Association.

== Death and legacy ==
He died in Newport, Rhode Island December 21, 1941, at the Naval Hospital, Newport. He was buried at Arlington National Cemetery with his wife Georgie. In 1943, the destroyer USS Caperton (DD-650) was named in his honor. His role in the US occupation of Haiti has attracted criticism from modern historians.

== Dates of rank ==
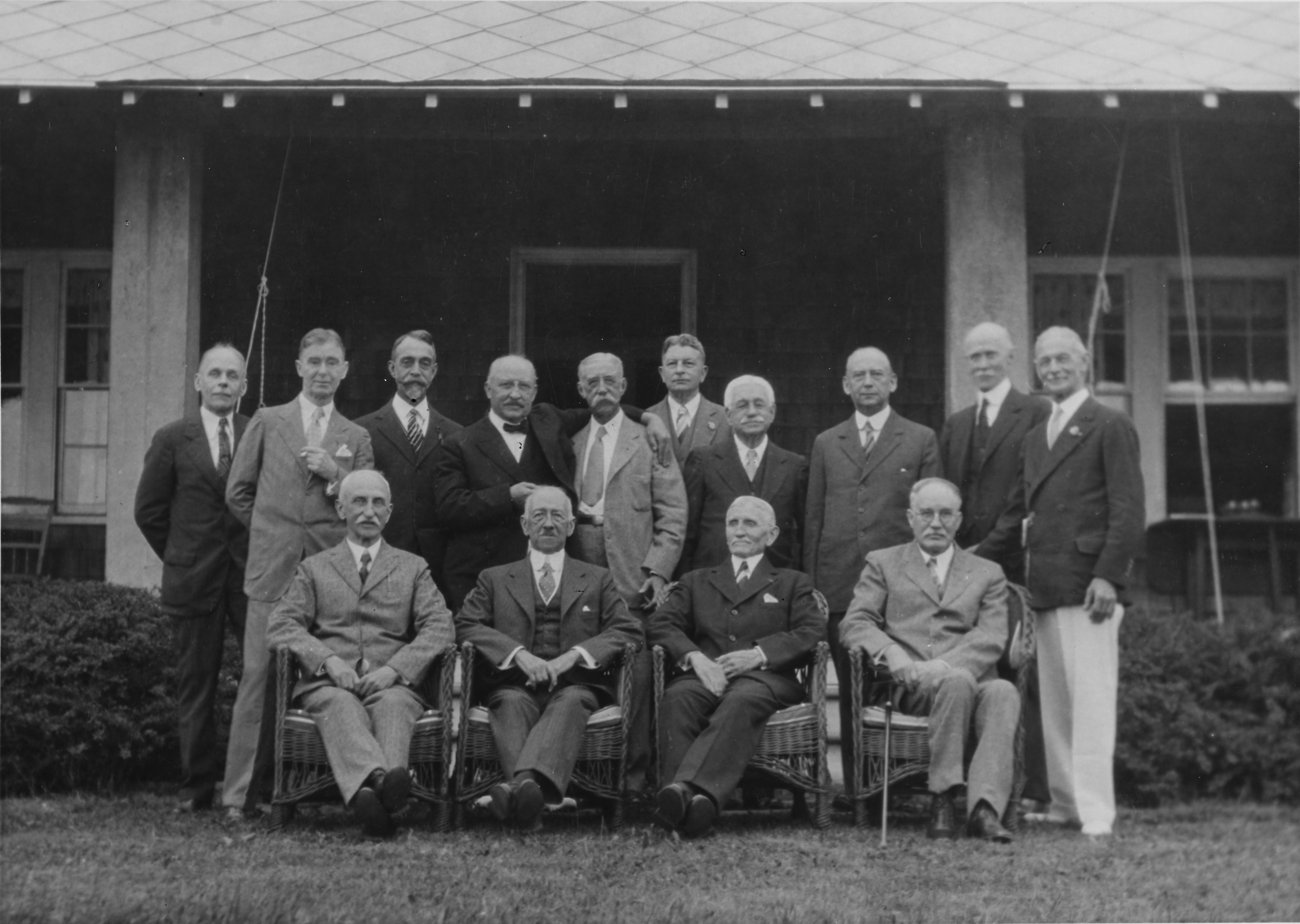
Caperton is seated second from right in this 7 August 1928 photograph of retired U.S. Navy rear admirals and other retirees at Rear Admiral Spencer S. Wood's home in Jamestown, Rhode Island.

- Midshipman – September 17, 1871?
- Ensign – August 3, 1875
- Lieutenant (junior grade) – October 13, 1883
- Lieutenant – October 24, 1889
- Lieutenant-Commander – unknown
- Commander – unknown
- Captain – unknown
- Rear Admiral – February 14, 1913
- Admiral – July 28, 1916

Preceded by Cameron M. Winslow	Commander in Chief, United States Pacific Fleet; July 28, 1916 – April 30, 1919	Succeeded by Hugh Rodman
