= List of Jewish Americans in the military =

This is a list of notable Jewish Americans in the U.S. military. For other Jewish Americans, see Lists of Jewish Americans.

- Colonel Aaron Bank, founder of the Green Berets › archives› la-xpm-2004-apr-02-me-bank2-story.html
- Mel Brooks, U.S. Army combat engineer during World War II who participated in the Battle of the Bulge. He spent some time in the brig for smashing an antisemitic heckler in the face with a mess kit.
- Solomon Bush, soldier and signer of the non-importation agreement of October 1765
- Martin Dannenberg, U.S. Army intelligence officer during World War II
- Sergeant Sam Dreben, served in the United States Army in the Philippines, Panama Canal Zone, the Pancho Villa Expedition, and World War I, also fought in Honduras, Guatemala, Nicaragua, and the Mexican revolution; noted for his prowess with machine guns
- Kirk Douglas World War II, U.S. Navy
- David Max Eichhorn (January 6, 1906–July 16, 1986), Reform Jewish rabbi, author, and chaplain in the army who was among the troops that liberated Dachau; founded Merritt Island's Temple Israel
- Moses Jacob Ezekiel, Confederate Army soldier
- Jeffrey S. Feinstein, colonel, flying ace of the USAF in the Vietnam War
- Jacob Frankel, first official Jewish chaplain in the U.S. Armed Forces
- Joshua L. Goldberg, first rabbi to serve as a navy chaplain in WWII
- David L. Goldfein, General USAF, Chief of Staff of United States Air Force July 2016 – August 2020
- Alexander D. Goode, rabbi and a lieutenant in the United States Army. He was one of the Four Chaplains who gave their lives to save other soldiers during the sinking of the troop transport Dorchester during World War II.
- Eric Greitens, Rhodes Scholar; United States Navy SEAL; served in the Iraq and Afghanistan Wars; humanitarian who founded The Mission Continues
- Sydney G. Gumpertz, Medal of Honor, World War One
- Jacob Hirschorn, Mexican War veteran
- Zach Iscol (born 1978), U.S. Marine Corps veteran, entrepreneur, 2021 comptroller candidate for New York City
- Jack H. Jacobs, Medal of Honor recipient, Vietnam
- Leopold Karpeles (Civil War), sergeant, Medal of Honor recipient, Battle of the Wilderness, 1864
- Leon Klinghoffer, World War II veteran U.S. Army Air Corps
- Benjamin Levy (Civil War), private, Medal of Honor recipient, Battle of Glendale, 1862
- Uriah P. Levy (War of 1812), first Jewish commodore; first Jewish American to have a full U.S. Navy career (1812–1862); hero of the War of 1812; instrumental in ending the practice of flogging; bought, repaired, restored, and preserved Monticello (Jefferson's home) (1834–1862); namesake of the Jewish Chapel at the Norfolk Naval Base and the Jewish Chapel at the United States Naval Academy
- Elaine Luria, politician who served as a naval officer for 20 years
- Robert Magnus, general, former assistant commandant of the Marine Corps
- David "Mickey" Marcus (World War II), Army lieutenant colonel, West Point graduate, divisional judge advocate, division commander; attended the "Big Five" meetings; volunteered to join D-Day airborne assault without formal training; received Distinguished Service Cross, Bronze Star, and British decorations; volunteered to Israeli Army to defend against Transjordan Arab Legion; became first Israeli brigadier general; served as commander of Jerusalem front
- Morris W. Morris, a.k.a. Lewis Morrison, first Jewish commissioned officer in both the Confederate (1861) and Union (1861–1865) armies; served with the 2nd Louisiana Native Guard (Confederate) and also with the 2nd Louisiana Native Guard (U.S.) after its reorganization as a Union regiment
- Judah Nadich, Jewish chaplain and advisor on Jewish affairs on Gen Dwight D. Eisenhower's staff
- Mark Polansky, NASA, USAF (Ret.), Space Shuttle commander
- Arnold Resnicoff, navy chaplain, special assistant (for Values and Vision) to the Secretary and Chief of Staff of the United States Air Force (Equivalent military rank: brigadier general)
- Hyman Rickover, United States Navy admiral, "Father of the Nuclear Navy"
- Jack L. Rives, lieutenant general, USAF, TJAG (The Judge Advocate General of the Air Force)
- Maurice Rose, major general (World War II); negotiated the unconditional surrender of the Germans in Tunisia, Commanded 3rd Armored Division, the first division to cross the German border and the first to breach the Siegfried line; killed in combat
- Max Rose, U.S. Army infantry officer, veteran of the War in Afghanistan. Recipient of the Purple Heart for injuries sustained in the detonation of an improvised explosive device.
- Tibor Rubin (Korea), recipient of the Medal of Honor for actions in battle and in a Chinese POW camp
- Brigadier General Edward S. Salomon (Civil War)
- Haym Salomon (American Revolution), Sons of Liberty, financier
- Francis Salvador (American Revolution), "Paul Revere of the South"
- Norton A. Schwartz, general, Chief of Staff of the Air Force
- Mordecai Sheftall, fought in the Revolutionary War and financier
- George Stern (Civil War), enlisted in the U.S. Marine Corps as "Charles Stein" in June 1864 in Philadelphia, promoted to sergeant and later captured by the Confederates and imprisoned in Pensacola
- Michel Thomas (World War II), awarded Silver Star for service with 45th Infantry Division in 1944; CIC Agent, 1945–47
- Judah Touro (War of 1812), civilian volunteer in the American Army; philanthropist

== See also ==
- List of Jewish Medal of Honor recipients
- Military history of Jewish Americans
- Jewish War Veterans of the United States of America
