= Charles Gardner =

Charles Gardner may refer to:

- Charles Gardner (botanist) (1896–1970), Australian botanist
- Charles Gardner (Australian cricketer) (1908–2001), Australian cricketer
- Murray Gardner (cricketer) (Charles Murray Shand Gardner, 1913–2001), South African cricketer
- Charles Gardner (politician) (1828–1917), politician from Minnesota Territory
- Charles Gardner (Medal of Honor) (1844–1895), German-born Indian Wars Medal of Honor recipient
- Charles J. Gardner (1843–1901), American politician from New York
- Charles N. Gardner (1845–1919), American Civil War soldier and Medal of Honor recipient
- Charles Bruce-Gardner (1887–1960), English industrialist
- Charles Gairdner (1898–1983), British Army general
- Dick Gardner (Charles Richard Gardner, 1913–1997), English footballer
- Chuck Gardner (Charles Rutland Gardner, born 1944), American basketball plater

== See also ==
- Alfred Charles Gardner (1880–1952), Scottish engineer
- Charles Gardner Radbourn (1854–1897), American professional baseball pitcher
- Bertie Charles Gardner (1884–1972), British-Canadian banker
- Charles Gardner Geyh, law professor at Indiana University
- Charles Gardiner (disambiguation)
- Gardner (surname)
