= Military history of Jewish Americans =

Aspect of American military history

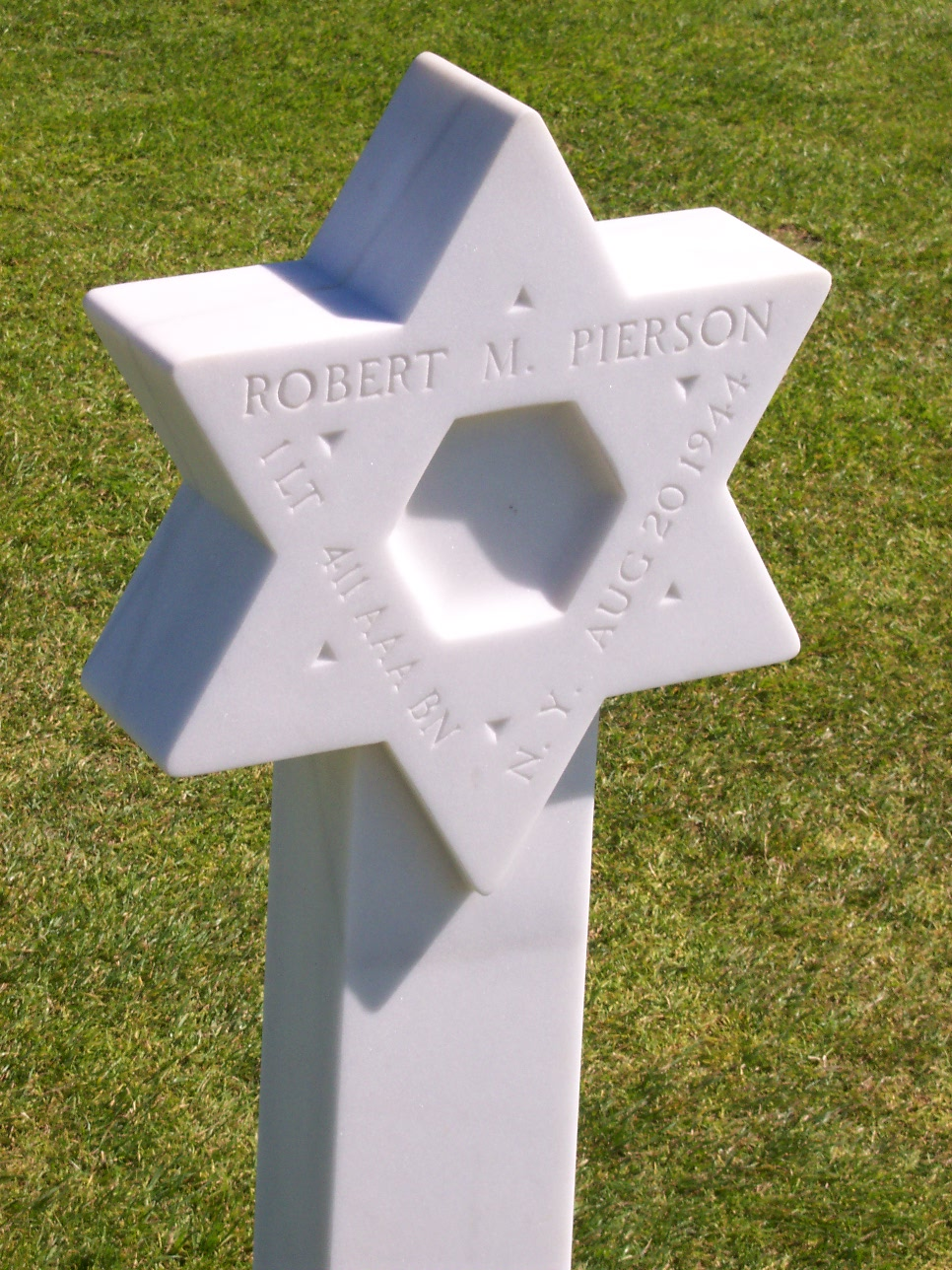
Grave of a Jewish American soldier at Normandy. An inscription on the stone reveals that the soldier was a first lieutenant from New York who served in the 411th Antiaircraft Artillery Gun Battalion.

Jewish Americans have served in the United States armed forces dating back to before the colonial era, when Jews had served in militias of the Thirteen Colonies. Jewish military personnel have served in all branches of the armed forces and in every major armed conflict to which the United States has been involved. According to the U.S. Department of Defense, as of 2006 there were currently 3,973 known Jewish servicemen and servicewomen on active duty.

A number of Jewish American servicemen have gained fame due to their military service, and many have received awards and decorations for distinguished service, valor, or heroism. More than 20 Jewish servicemen were awarded the military's highest award, the Medal of Honor. Many other American Jews who served in the military later achieved prominence in business, politics, science, entertainment and other fields. American Jews, both native- and foreign-born, have also been significant in the development of American military science and technology—including physicists Albert Einstein, J. Robert Oppenheimer, Richard Feynman, and Edward Teller, who were important in the Manhattan Project, which led to the development of the first nuclear weapons.

== Participation by war ==
=== French and Indian War ===
Though the history of Jews in this pre-independence conflict is poorly documented, the 19th century historian Simon Wolf documented one Jew from New York who became captain of a company of bateau men, and two others who served in an expedition across the Allegheny Mountains.

=== American Revolutionary War ===
On the eve of the American Revolutionary War the Jewish population of the thirteen colonies numbered somewhere between 2,000 and 3,000, out of a total colonial population of roughly 2.5 million, and was concentrated in five port towns: New York, Newport, Philadelphia, Charleston and Savannah. Historians generally estimate that over 100 Jewish men can be documented in Patriot service, whether in the Continental Army, in state militias, or in the commissary and supply establishment.

Because the Patriot forces imposed no religious test on enlistment or commissioning, Jews could hold commissions in the American service at a time when a commission in the British Army still required a Christian oath. At least fifteen Jewish men are known to have become officers. Among them were colonel Mordecai Sheftall of Savannah, chairman of the local revolutionary committee and Deputy Commissary General of Issues to Continental troops in South Carolina and Georgia, who was captured with his son Sheftall Sheftall at the fall of Savannah in December 1778 and held aboard a prison ship; Solomon Bush, appointed deputy adjutant general of the Pennsylvania militia in July 1777, severely wounded in a skirmish on Chestnut Hill that September and afterwards promoted to lieutenant colonel; and lieutenant colonel David Salisbury Franks, a Montreal merchant who joined the American cause during the invasion of Canada, served as aide-de-camp to Benedict Arnold, was exonerated and cleared of any complicity after Arnold's defection, and who later carried dispatches to the American commissioners in Europe.

Francis Salvador, a London-born planter who in 1774 became the first Jew elected to a legislative body in the American colonies when he took a seat in the South Carolina Provincial Congress, was killed in an ambush in the Cherokee backcountry on 1 August 1776, and is generally identified as the first Jew to die in the war. In Charleston, so many men from the King Street Jewish neighbourhood enlisted in the militia company of Captain Richard Lushington that it became known as the "Jews' Company"; it fought at Beaufort in 1779, and some of its members were killed or captured during the Siege of Charleston the following year. Others served outside the line: Philip Moses Russell was a surgeon's mate with the 2nd Virginia Regiment at Valley Forge, and Haym Salomon, twice arrested by the British in occupied New York, acted as broker to U.S. Superintendent of Finance Robert Morris and extended personal loans to members of the Continental Congress.

As in the wider colonial population, Jewish allegiance was divided. At least fifteen New York Jews remained in the occupied city and openly declared for the Crown, and the congregation of Shearith Israel split, one of its two Torah scrolls leaving for Connecticut with the hazzan Gershom Mendes Seixas while the other stayed behind. David Franks of Philadelphia served the British as commissary of prisoners and was tried for treason when the Americans retook the city; Isaac Hart, a Newport merchant and declared loyalist, was bayoneted by Patriot raiders at Lloyd's Neck in 1780 and died of his wounds.

==== Haym Solomon ====
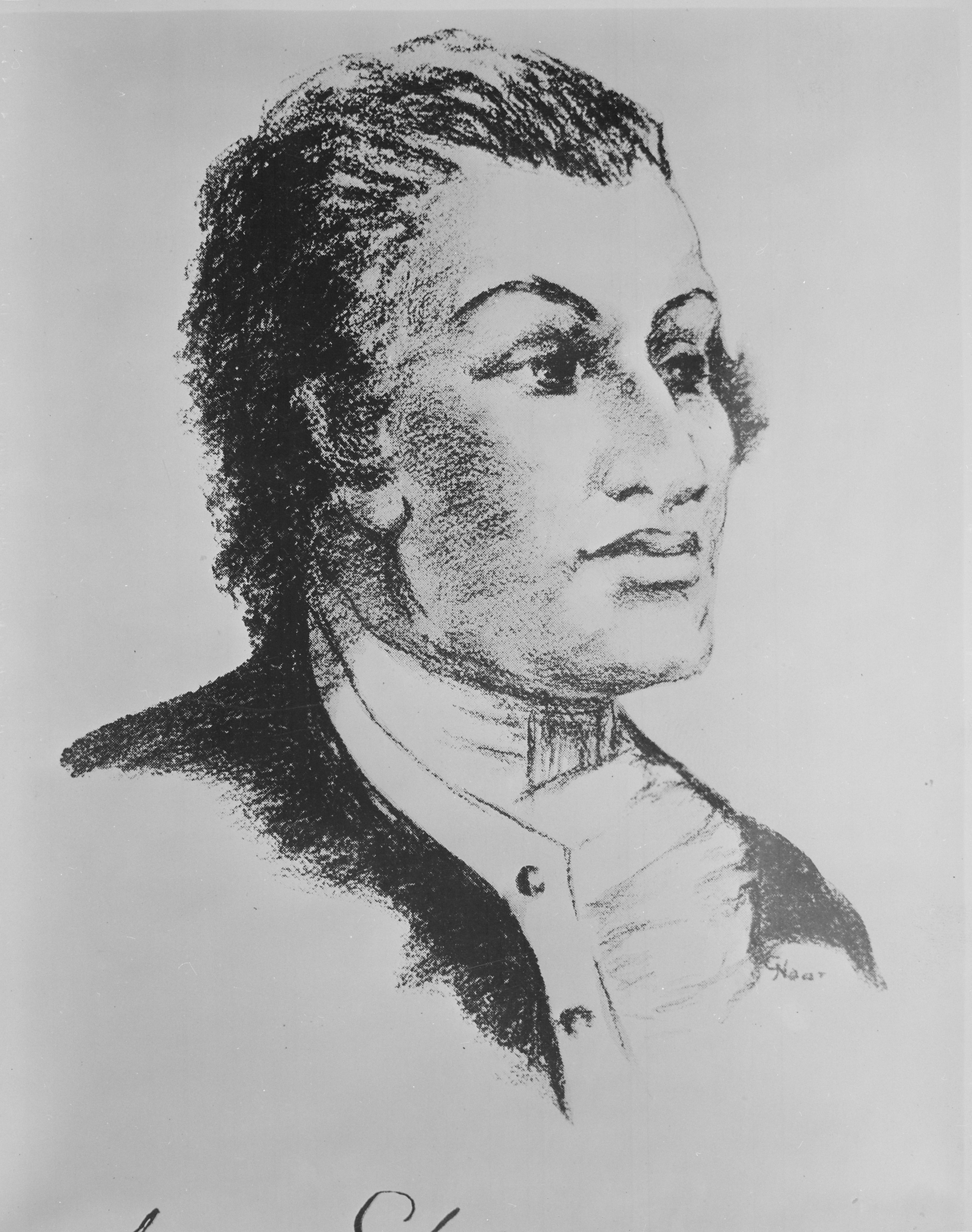
Haym Solomon, personal friend of General George Washington and financier of the American Revolution

During the American Revolutionary War, the Polish-born Haym Solomon (1740–1785), who immigrated to New York and was a friend of George Washington, was a key financier who helped fund the Continental Army. Solomon became the agent to the French consul, as well as the paymaster for the French forces in North America. In 1781, he began working extensively with Robert Morris, the newly appointed Superintendent for Finance for the Thirteen Colonies. Often working out of the "London Coffee House" in Philadelphia, at one time Solomon sold about $600,000 in bills of exchange to his clients. At one point, when Washington's war chest and the treasury of the Continental Congress was completely empty, Washington determined that he needed at least $20,000 to finance the campaign. When Morris told him there were no funds and no credit available, Washington gave him a simple but eloquent order: "Send for Haym Salomon". Haym again came through, and the $20,000 was raised. Washington conducted the Yorktown campaign, which proved to be the final battle of the Revolution, thanks to Haym Salomon.

Salomon negotiated the sale of a majority of the war aid from France and the Dutch Republic, selling bills of exchange to American merchants. Solomon also personally supported various members of the Continental Congress during their stay in Philadelphia, including James Madison and James Wilson. He requested below market interest rates, and he never asked for repayment.

=== Civil War ===
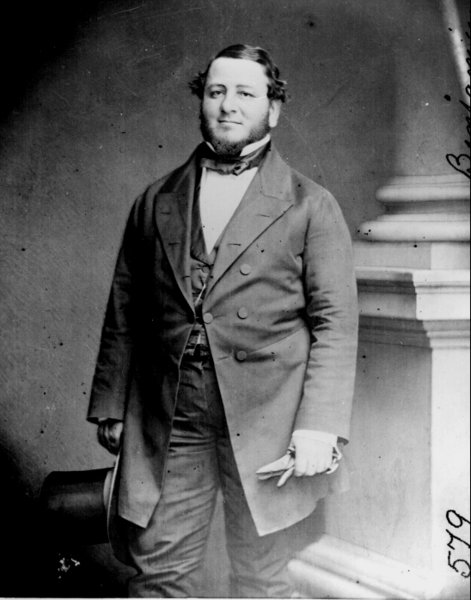
Judah P. Benjamin served as the second Confederate States Secretary of War from September 17, 1861 to March 24, 1862.

Reflecting their pattern of long settlement in both northern and southern cities, Jews served and supported both the Union Army of the Northern States as well as the Confederate States Army of the Southern Confederate States of America during the American Civil War. They had generally taken on regional loyalties according to residence. Jews were among the supporters of each side of the American Civil War. Some 150,000 Jews lived in the United States at the time of the American Civil War, about 0.5 percent of the population. One academic estimate was that at least 8,000 Jewish soldiers fought for the Union and Confederacy during the Civil War. Donald Altschiller estimates that at least 10,000 Jews served, about 7,000 for the Union and 3,000 for the Confederacy, with some 600 Jewish soldiers killed in battle.

Jews also played leadership roles on both sides, with nine Jewish generals and 21 Jewish colonels participating in the war. Judah P. Benjamin, a non-observant Jew, served as Secretary of State and acting Secretary of War of the Confederacy.

==== Jews and the Union ====
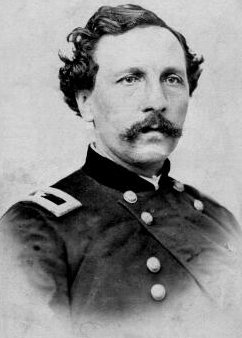
Union Army Brevet Major General Frederick Salomon

The Civil War, also saw the appointment of the first official Jewish chaplain in the US Army, Rev. Jacob Frankel of Philadelphia's Congregation Rodeph Shalom, on September 18, 1862. While Catholic chaplains had been appointed first during the Mexican–American War, to serve the needs of the large influx of Irish immigrant enlistments, the same had not been accomplished for Jewish Americans; to make matters worse, in 1861 Congress ordered military regiments to appoint Chaplains who were specifically of the Christian faith. Following protests by the Board of Delegates of American Israelites and introductions by others, a meeting was held in December 1861 with President Lincoln, which led to the rescinding of the order and the appointment of the first Jewish chaplain. Some sources consider this intercession "perhaps the first example of organized Jewish lobbying in Washington".

During the war, approximately 7,000 Jews (out of around 150,000 Jews in the United States) fought on the Union side. Two Union Jewish companies were raised, including Company C of the 82d Regiment of the Illinois Volunteers, made up mostly of recent immigrants from Europe, and the "Perkins Rifles" of Syracuse, New York. But, most Jews serving in the war served alongside Christian soldiers, many in units such as Company D of the 8th New York National Guard Regiment and the Light Infantry Blues of Richmond.

Four generals are known to have been Jews who served the Union and attained higher rank in the heat of key battles:

1. Brigadier General Frederick Salomon enlisted in the Union Army in 1861. He was commissioned as a captain in the 5th Missouri Volunteers. He was appointed as a colonel in the 9th Wisconsin Infantry. In June 1862 he was promoted to brigadier general and was assigned to command a brigade. He made an unsuccessful attempt to capture Newtonia, Missouri. His unit battled the Confederate Army to defend Helena and Jenkins Ferry. He served to the end of the war and he received the brevet of major general in March 1865.
2. Brevet Brigadier General Leopold Blumenberg: When the Civil War erupted, his unit was called upon to do battle in the Battle of Antietam against the Confederate Army led by General Robert E. Lee. Major Leopold Blumenberg was severely wounded. He was appointed a brevet general, an honorary rank without any an increase in pay or in authority. Because of his wounds, Blumenberg was appointed a Provost Marshal for the 3rd District of Maryland in May 1865. He was mustered out of the Army in January 1865, and President Lincoln appointed him superintendent of the Warehouses at the Baltimore custom house.
3. Brevet Brigadier General Frederick Knefler's father, Dr. Nathan Knefler, was one of the founders of the Indianapolis Hebrew Congregation, the first synagogue in the city. He was commissioned as a first lieutenant of the 11th Indiana Infantry. In 1861 he was promoted to captain. He served as a major and assistant adjutant general on the staff of Major General Lew Wallace and appointed captain of the 79th Indiana. He led them into battle at the battles of Perryville, Murfreesboro and in the Tullahoma and Chickamauga campaigns. In the Chattanooga campaign he led the charge at Missionary Ridge. In March 1865 he was appointed a Brevet Brigadier General for bravery and meritorious services.
4. Brevet Brigadier General Edward S. Salomon was the commander of the 82nd Illinois which included more than 100 Jews, when the Confederate and Union armies collided and battled at the Battle of Gettysburg July 1–3, 1863. His ability to lead men was quickly recognized and he rapidly rose through the ranks. Salomon received a brevet promotion to brigadier general in March 1865. After the Battle of Atlanta, Colonel John Cleveland Robinson recognized the feats of Colonel Salomon when he wrote: "I consider Colonel Salomon one of the most deserving officers. His regiment is deserving of high praise. In a point of discipline it is second to none in the corps."

==== Jews and the Confederacy ====
During the war, of the 8,000-10,000 Jewish soldiers that fought for either side, approximately 3,000 fought for the Confederacy. The most prominent Jewish figure was Judah P. Benjamin (1811–1884), a strong slavery supporter, who, before the Civil War, was the first Jewish Cabinet member in a North American government. Benjamin was born a British subject in Saint Croix to Phillip Benjamin, an English Jew, and his wife, Rebecca Mendes, a Portuguese Jew (Sephardic). He immigrated with his parents to the U.S. several years later and grew up in North and South Carolina. He was considered the "brains of the Confederacy," serving in high office throughout the war: as Confederate Attorney General in 1861, Secretary of War in 1861 and 1862, and Secretary of State from 1862 to 1865. President Jefferson Davis called Benjamin "the most capable statesman I have ever known," but he was subject to "vicious anti-Jewish attacks" as the object of popular discontent after becoming acting Secretary of War in 1861, a position he resigned. He quarreled with the Confederate generals P. G. T. Beauregard and Stonewall Jackson over strategy. In 1864, as the South's military position became increasingly desperate, Benjamin publicly advocated a plan whereby any slave willing to bear arms for the Confederacy would be emancipated and inducted, but his proposal faced stiff opposition from traditionalists. It was not passed until March 1865, by which time it was too late to salvage the Southern cause.

Other prominent Jewish Confederate figures include Colonel Abraham Charles Myers of Charleston, South Carolina, the Quartermaster General of the Confederate States Army and Dr. David Camden de Leon, the Surgeon General of the Army. The surgeon Dr. Simon Baruch, father of the financier Bernard Baruch, served on General Robert E. Lee's personal staff. His widow became an early member of the Daughters of the Confederacy.

In 1862, Union General Ulysses Grant issued his infamous General Order No. 11, ordering the expulsion of all Jews "as a class" from those states under his jurisdiction: Kentucky, Tennessee, and Mississippi.

Major Raphael J. Moses, a Georgia businessman and later a state representative, before the war was commissary officer of Georgia. He carried out the last order of the Confederate government on May 5, 1865, by taking possession of $40,000 in gold and silver bullion from the Confederate treasury and delivering it to defeated Confederate soldiers headed home—following President Jefferson Davis' instructions. All three of Moses' sons served in the Confederate Army, and one was killed at Seven Pines.

Future sculptor Moses Jacob Ezekiel participated in the Battle of New Market. A "Confederate expatriate" in Rome, through his sculptures he became a key figure in the Lost Cause of the Confederacy interpretation of the war.

=== World War I ===
Jews served in numbers higher than their proportion of the population. In the 77th Division, originally recruited from the greater New York City area, perhaps a third of the soldiers may have been Jewish. This division fought through the entire Meuse-Argonne campaign, and its units comprised the legendary "Lost Battalion of the Argonne." Sergeant Benjamin Kaufman won the Medal of Honor in the fighting to relieve the Lost Battalion, which had been surrounded by German forces after achieving a breakthrough at Charlevaux Mill.

Another prominent story involves William Shemin, who sprinted across a battlefield to pull wounded comrades to safety no fewer than three times. The 19-year-old American then took over command of his unit and led it to safety. For his actions, he was awarded the Distinguished Service Cross. In December 2011, President Barack Obama signed the National Defense Authorization Act, which contains a provision known as the William Shemin Jewish World War I Veterans Act. It provides for a Pentagon review of the military records of Jewish soldiers and sailors who may have been overlooked for the Medal of Honor simply due to their faith.

=== World War II ===
==== Half a million Jewish soldiers ====
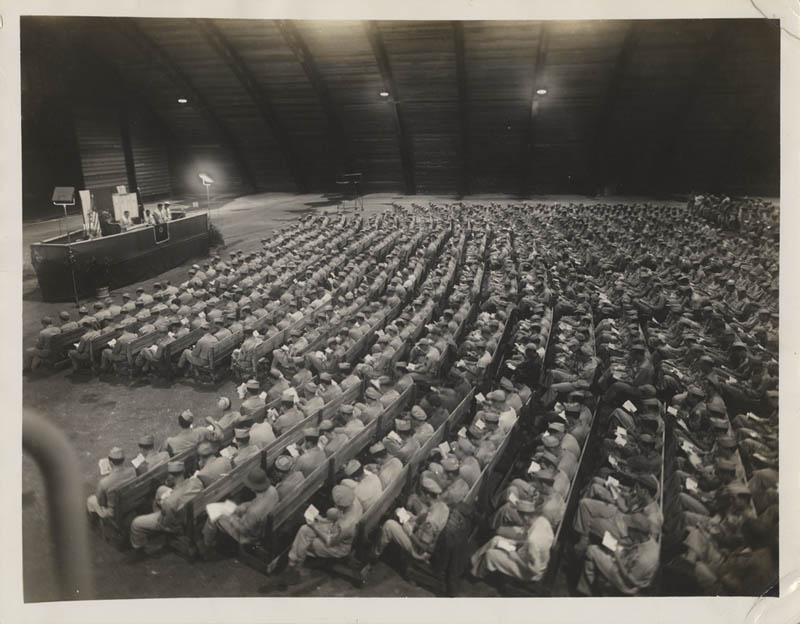
Servicemen of the 20th Air Force stationed in Guam during World War II participate in a Rosh Hashanah service.

During World War II, approximately 500,000 American Jews served in the various branches of the United States armed services. Roughly 52,000 of these received U.S. military awards. The historian Solomon Grayzel, in A History of the Jews: From the Babylonian Exile to the Present, records that more than a million Jews were officially enrolled in the fighting forces of the Allies and that the largest number were Jewish Americans. Grayzel gives a number of 550,000 Jews in military service in the United States during World War II out of a total population of 4,770,000 American Jews.

==== Major General Maurice Rose ====
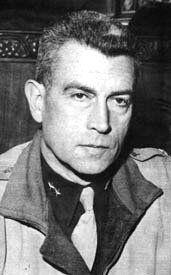
Maurice Rose

Major General Maurice Rose (1899–1945) was a United States Army general during World War II and World War I veteran. The son and grandson of rabbis, General Rose was at the time the highest ranking Jew in the U.S. Army.

The Third Armored Division official history of World War II, published after Rose had been killed in action states "He was over six feet tall, erect, dark haired, and had finely chiseled features. He was firm and prompt of decision, brooking no interference by man, events or conditions in order to destroy the enemy."

Rose was the highest-ranking American killed by enemy fire in the European Theater of Operations during the war.

==== Rabbi Goode and the "Immortal Chaplains" ====
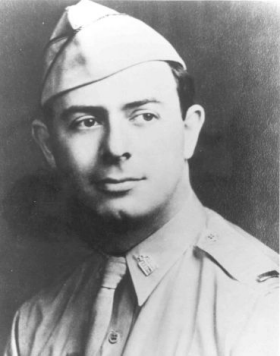
Chaplain Goode

Chaplain Alexander D. Goode, a rabbi, was one of the "Four Chaplains" or "Immortal Chaplains", a name given to honor four US military chaplains who sacrificed their lives to save other soldiers during the sinking of the troop transport Dorchester by a U-boat off the coast of Newfoundland in February 1943. Goode and the three other chaplains, Methodist, Roman Catholic, and Reformed Church in America, helped to evacuate the ship. When lifejackets ran out, they gave up their own to save more troops. The four sang and prayed as they went down with the ship.

==== Jewish scientists and the Manhattan Project ====
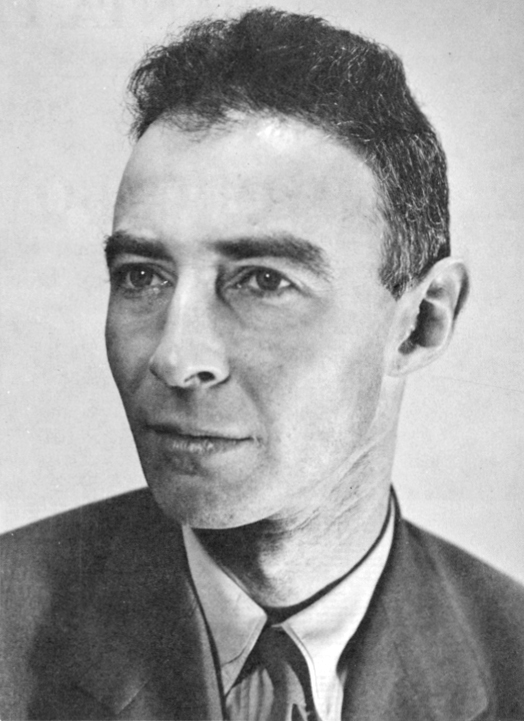
A few months after he was put in charge of fast neutron research, Berkeley physicist J. Robert Oppenheimer convened a conference on the topic of nuclear weapon design.

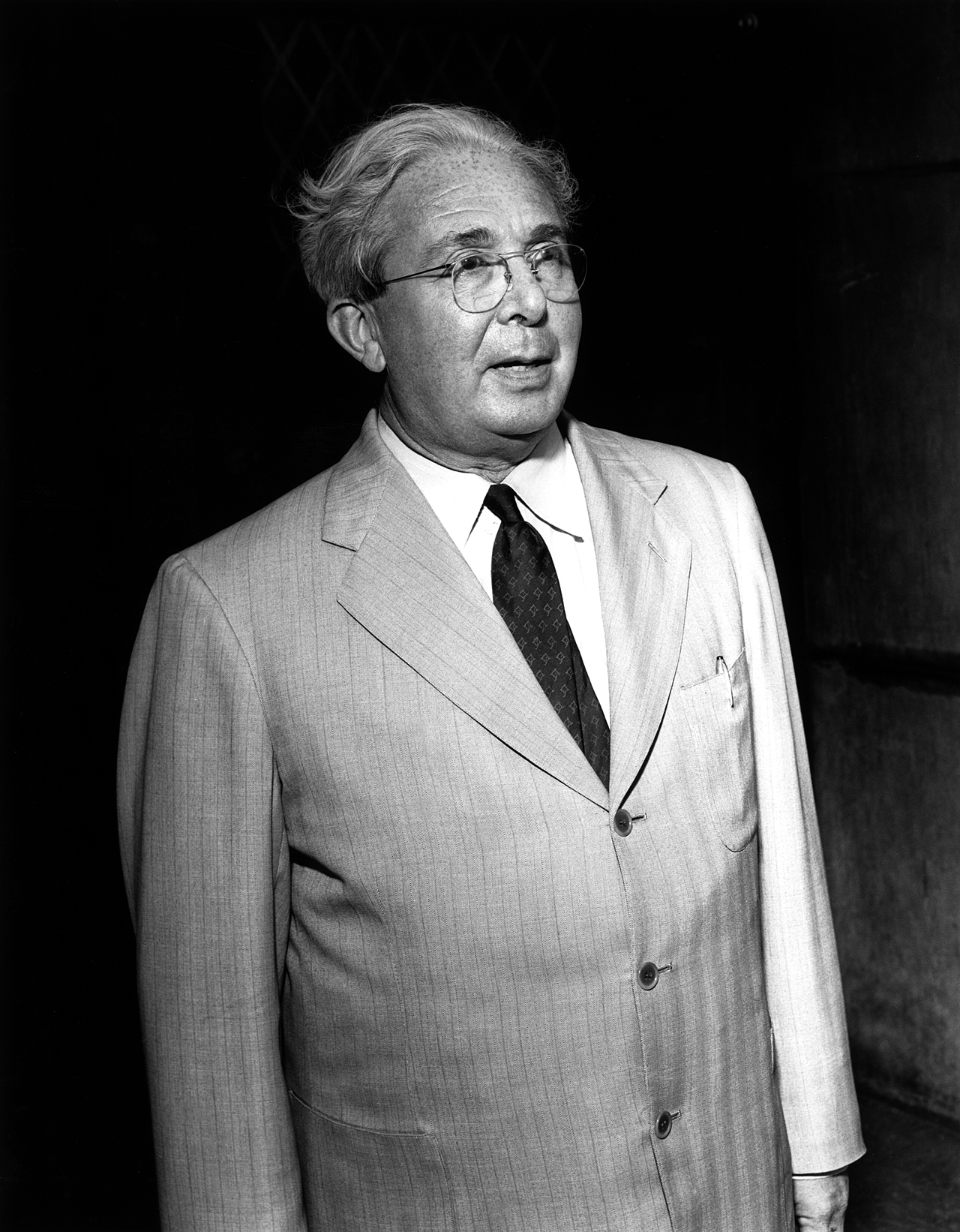
Leó Szilárd, the driving force to create the Manhattan Project, wrote the Einstein–Szilárd letter which was signed by Albert Einstein.

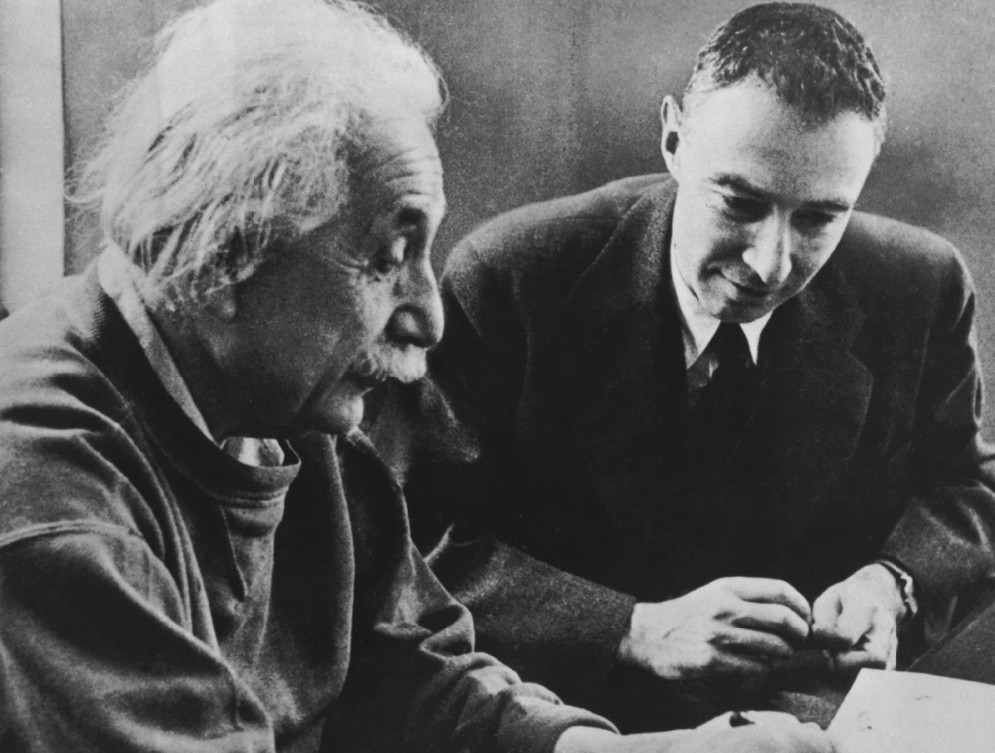
Albert Einstein (left) with J. Robert Oppenheimer (right) working on the Manhattan Project

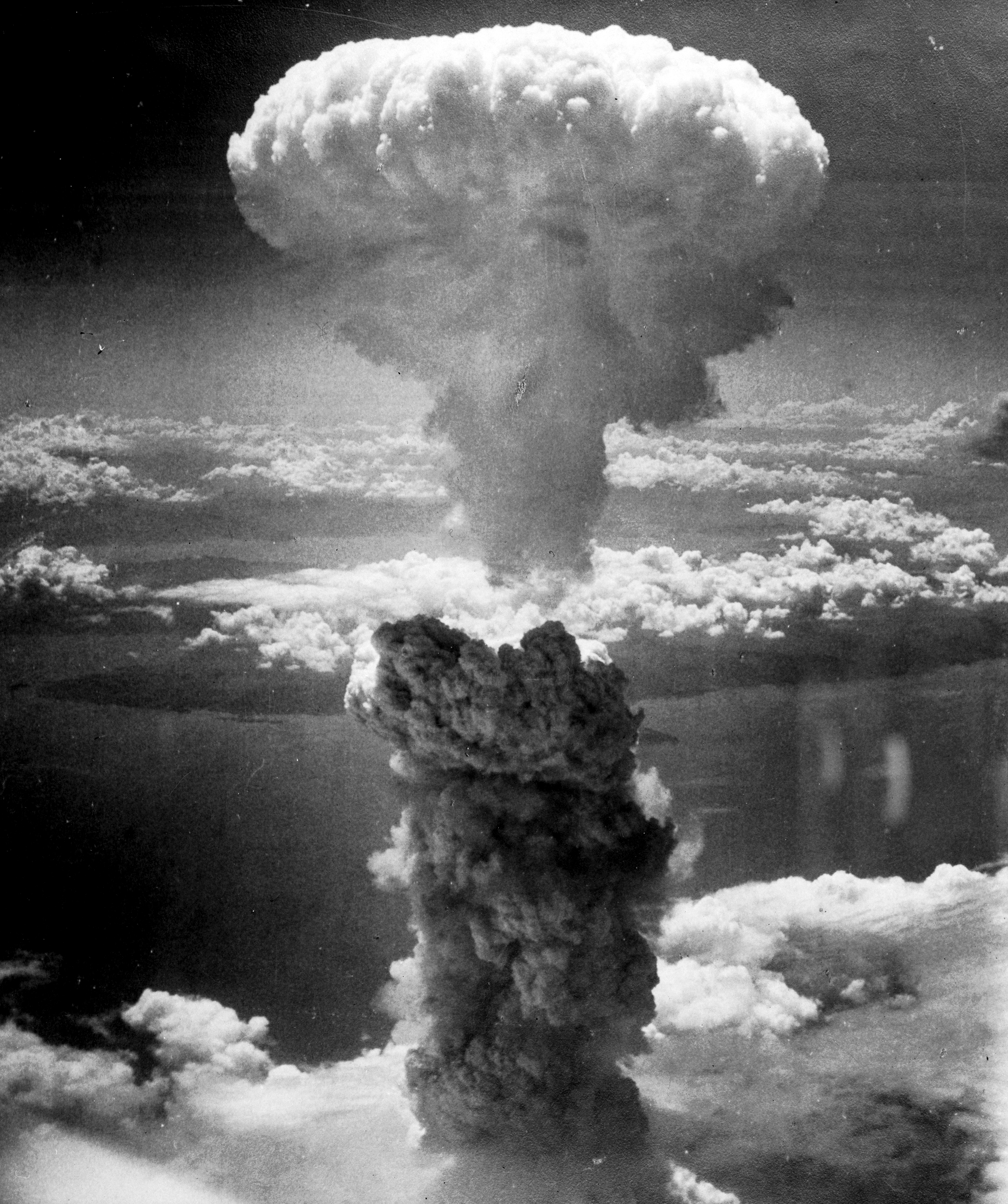
The Fat Man mushroom cloud resulting from the nuclear explosion over Nagasaki rises 18 km (11 mi, 60,000 ft) into the air from the hypocenter, resulting in the surrender of Japan and United States' victory over Japan in World War II.

America's rise as a nuclear power resulted directly from the Manhattan Project, codename for a project during World War II to develop the first atomic bombs for wartime use. The project's roots began in 1939 when, at the urging of Leó Szilárd, Albert Einstein signed the Einstein–Szilárd letter to US president Franklin D. Roosevelt expressing his concerns that Nazi Germany may be trying to develop nuclear weapons.

Albert Einstein (1879–1955) was a theoretical physicist and philosopher, widely regarded as one of the most influential and best known scientists and intellectuals of all time. A German-Swiss Nobel laureate, Einstein is often regarded as the father of modern physics. His father was Hermann Einstein, a salesman and engineer. His mother was Pauline Einstein (née Koch). The Einsteins were non-observant Jews.

In 1933, Einstein was compelled to immigrate to the United States due to the rise to power of the Nazis under Germany's new chancellor, Adolf Hitler. While visiting American universities in April 1933, he learned that the new German government had passed a law barring Jews from holding any official positions, including teaching at universities. A month later, the Nazi book burnings occurred, with Einstein's works being among those burnt, and Nazi propaganda minister Joseph Goebbels proclaimed, "Jewish intellectualism is dead." Einstein also learned that his name was on a list of assassination targets, with a "$5,000 bounty on his head". One German magazine included him in a list of enemies of the German regime with the phrase, "not yet hanged".

Leó Szilárd (1898–1964) was a Jewish Hungarian physicist who conceived the nuclear chain reaction in 1933, patented the idea of a nuclear reactor with Enrico Fermi, and in late 1939 wrote the letter for Albert Einstein's signature that resulted in the Manhattan Project that built the atomic bomb. Szilárd left Hungary because of the rising antisemitism under the Horthy regime, which excluded Jewish students from Hungary's universities.

Szilárd was directly responsible for the creation of the Manhattan Project. He drafted a confidential letter to Franklin D. Roosevelt explaining the possibility of nuclear weapons, warning of Nazi work on such weapons and encouraging the US development of a program to create them. During August 1939 he approached his old friend and collaborator Albert Einstein and convinced him to sign the letter, lending his fame to the proposal. The Einstein–Szilárd letter resulted in the establishment of research into nuclear fission by the U.S. government and ultimately to the creation of the Manhattan Project; FDR gave the letter to an aide, General Edwin M. "Pa" Watson with the instruction: "Pa, this requires action!" Later, Szilárd relocated to the University of Chicago to continue work on the project. There, along with Fermi, he helped to construct the first "neutronic reactor", a uranium and graphite "atomic pile" in which the first self-sustaining nuclear chain reaction was achieved, during 1942. Szilárd became a naturalized citizen of the United States during 1943.

J. Robert Oppenheimer (1904–1967) was appointed the scientific director of the Manhattan Project, the World War II project that developed the first nuclear weapons. He is often referred to as the "father of the atomic bomb". Oppenheimer was born to Julius S. Oppenheimer, who had immigrated to the United States from Germany in 1888 with his parents and become a wealthy Jewish textile importer, and Ella Friedman, a painter.

Among other German scientists forced to flee Germany were fourteen Nobel laureates and 26 of the 60 professors of theoretical physics in the country. Among the scientists who came to the United States or its Allies were Edward Teller, Niels Bohr, Enrico Fermi, Otto Stern, Victor Weisskopf, Hans Bethe, and Lise Meitner, many of whom worked to ensure that the Allies would develop nuclear weapons before the Nazis. With so many Jewish scientists forced to live in the United States, where they often worked together, Einstein wrote to a friend, "For me the most beautiful thing is to be in contact with a few fine Jews—a few millennia of a civilized past do mean something after all." In another letter he writes, "In my whole life I have never felt so Jewish as now." Einstein was offered a position at the Institute for Advanced Study at Princeton, New Jersey, an affiliation that lasted until his death in 1955.

In the summer of 1939, a few months before the beginning of World War II, Einstein was persuaded to write a letter to president Franklin D. Roosevelt and warn him that Nazi Germany might be developing an atomic bomb. Einstein helped strengthen the letter, and he recommended the U.S. begin uranium enrichment and nuclear research. According to F.G. Gosling of the U.S. Department of Energy, Einstein, Szilard, and other refugees including Edward Teller and Eugene Wigner, "regarded it as their responsibility to alert Americans to the possibility that German scientists might win the race to build an atomic bomb, and to warn that Hitler would be more than willing to resort to such a weapon." Gosling adds that "the President was a man of considerable action once he had chosen a direction," and believed that the U.S. "could not take the risk of allowing Hitler" to possess nuclear bombs.

Other weapons historians agree that the letter was "arguably the key stimulus for the U.S. adoption of serious investigations into nuclear weapons on the eve of the U.S. entry into World War II". As a result of Einstein's letter, and his meetings with Roosevelt, the U.S. entered the "race" to develop the bomb first, drawing on its "immense material, financial, and scientific resources". Due to the Manhattan Project, it was the only country to succeed in developing an atomic bomb during World War II.

Germany surrendered before atomic weapons could be used against it. Japan was bombed into surrendering when the United States finally deployed two atomic bombs against it at the atomic bombings of Hiroshima and Nagasaki on August 6 and 9, 1945.

=== Korean and Vietnam Wars ===
Jewish Americans continued to serve in the following two major wars, both of which involved the use of conscripted troops. Over 150,000 Jewish Americans (men and women) served in the Korean War. In Vietnam, 30,000 served.

== Cold War ==
=== Jewish scientists and the Hydrogen bomb and SDI ===
Key Jewish-born scientists ensured that the United States became the first and most dominant hydrogen bomb power, not long after having played key roles in the development of the first atomic bombs. Also known as the Teller–Ulam design that is the nuclear weapon design concept used in most of the world's nuclear weapons colloquially referred to as "the secret of the hydrogen bomb" because it employs hydrogen fusion to generate neutrons.

==== Edward Teller ====
The Teller–Ulam design is named for its inventors and creators Edward Teller (1908–2003) and Stanislaw Ulam. Teller was born in Budapest, Austria-Hungary to a Jewish family. He left Hungary in 1926 partly due to the antisemitic numerus clausus rule under Horthy's regime. He became a physicist, and was later known as "the father of the hydrogen bomb," even though he did not care for the title.

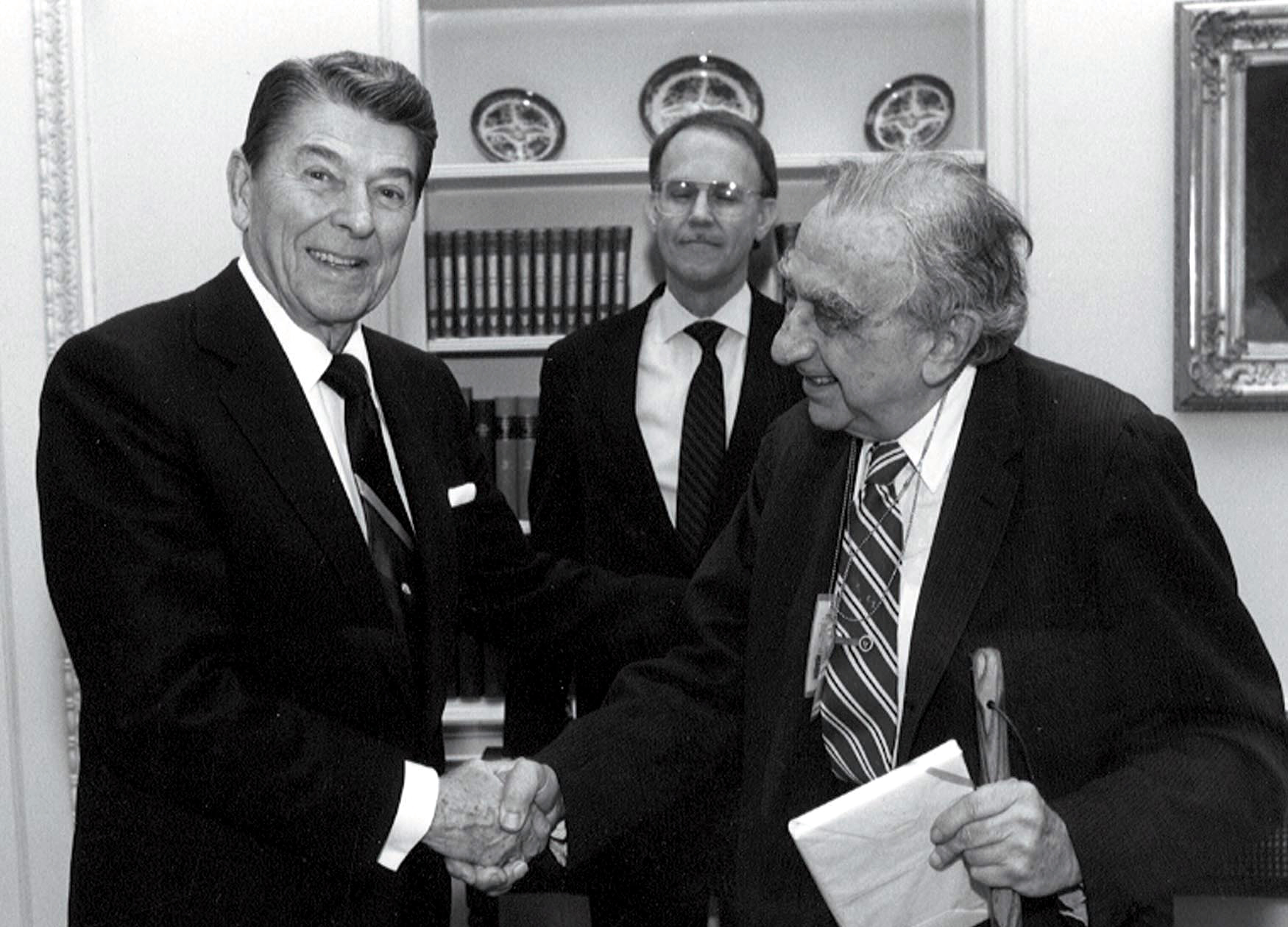
Edward Teller lobbied for the Strategic Defense Initiative to president Ronald Reagan in the 1980s, and succeeded in convincing him of its need.

Teller emigrated to the United States in the 1930s, and was an early member of the Manhattan Project charged with developing the first atomic bombs. During this time he made a serious push to develop the first fusion-based weapons as well, but these were deferred until after World War II. After his controversial testimony in the security clearance hearing of his former Los Alamos colleague J. Robert Oppenheimer, Teller was ostracized by much of the scientific community. He continued to find support from the U.S. government and military research establishment, particularly for his advocacy for nuclear energy development, a strong nuclear arsenal, and a vigorous nuclear testing program. He was a co-founder of Lawrence Livermore National Laboratory (LLNL), and was both its director and associate director for many years.

In the 1980s, Teller began a strong campaign for what was later called the Strategic Defense Initiative (SDI), derided by critics as "Star Wars," the concept of using ground and satellite-based lasers, particle beams and missiles to destroy incoming Soviet ICBMs. Teller lobbied with government agencies—and got the sanction of president Ronald Reagan—for a plan to develop a system using elaborate satellites which used atomic weapons to fire X-ray lasers at incoming missiles—as part of a broader scientific research program into defenses against nuclear weapons. Teller's own comments on the role of lasers in SDI, as disclosed in live panel discussions, were published, and are available, in two laser conference proceedings.

The Strategic Defense Initiative was created by U.S. President Ronald Reagan on March 23, 1983 to use ground and space-based systems to protect the United States from attack by strategic nuclear ballistic missiles. Supporters of SDI claimed it helped contribute to the fall of the Soviet Union by the so-called strategy of technology, which was a prevalent doctrine at the time. While SDI was a source of disagreement between the United States and the Soviet Union a summit led to the Intermediate-Range Nuclear Forces Treaty, which some have claimed was an outgrowth of USSR's Mikhail Gorbachev's fear of SDI. In 1991 president George H. W. Bush shifted the focus of SDI from defense of North America against large scale strikes to a system focusing on theater missile defense called Global Protection Against Limited Strikes (GPALS). In 1993 president Bill Clinton changed its name to the Ballistic Missile Defense Organization (BMDO) and its emphasis was shifted to theater missile defense and from global to regional coverage. BMDO was renamed to the Missile Defense Agency in 2002.

==== Stanislaw Ulam ====
Stanislaw Marcin Ulam (1909–1984) was an American mathematician of Polish Jewish origin, who participated in the Manhattan Project and originated the Teller–Ulam design of thermonuclear weapons. He also invented nuclear pulse propulsion and developed a number of mathematical tools in number theory, set theory, ergodic theory and algebraic topology. Ulam was born in Lwów Galicia to a wealthy Polish-Jewish banking and timber-processing family who were part of the large Jewish minority population of the city. Lwów (now Lviv, Ukraine) was then in the Austro-Hungarian Empire; from 1918 until 1939 was in the Second Polish Republic.

== Jews and the US Navy ==
=== Commodore Uriah P. Levy ===
Uriah Phillips Levy (1792–1862) was the first Jewish-American Commodore of the United States Navy and a veteran of the War of 1812. At the time, Commodore was the highest rank obtainable in the U.S. Navy and would be roughly equivalent to the modern-day rank of Admiral. During his tenure, he ended the Navy's practice of flogging, and prevailed against the antisemitic bigotry he faced among his fellow naval officers. His service is memorialized through the Commodore Uriah P. Levy Center and Jewish Chapel at the US Naval Academy at Annapolis.

=== Admiral Hyman G. Rickover ===
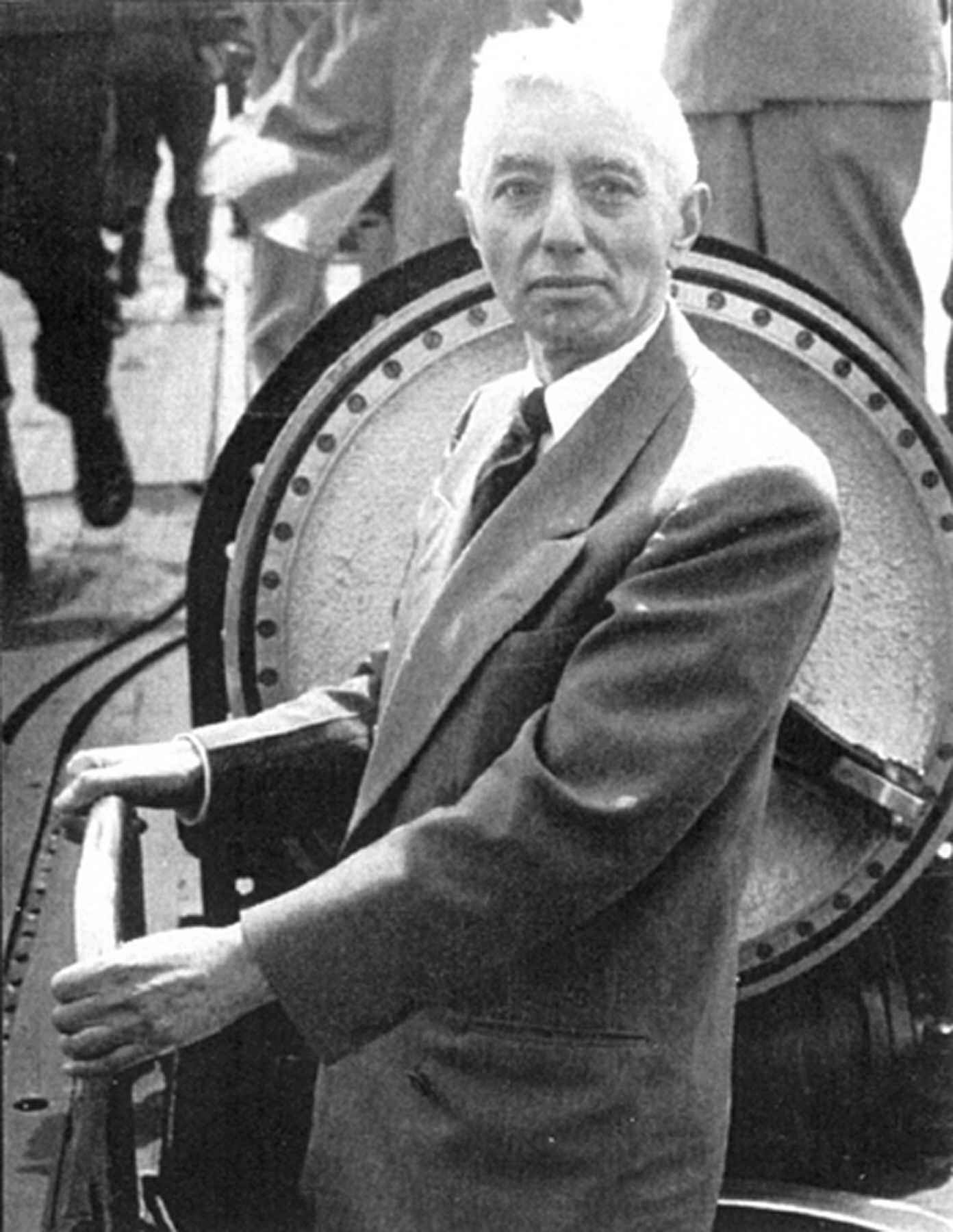
Admiral Rickover looking over USS Nautilus, the world's first nuclear-powered vessel

Hyman George Rickover (1900–1986), was born to Abraham Rickover and Rachel (née Unger) Rickover, a Jewish family in Maków Mazowiecki Poland, at that time under Russian rule. He rose to a four-star admiral in the United States Navy who directed the original development of naval nuclear propulsion and controlled its operations for three decades as director of Naval Reactors. He was known as the "Father of the Nuclear Navy", which as of July 2007 had produced 200 nuclear-powered submarines, and 23 nuclear-powered aircraft carriers and cruisers.

With his personality, political connections, responsibilities, and depth of knowledge regarding naval nuclear propulsion, Rickover became the longest-serving naval officer in U.S. history with 63 years active duty.

=== Admiral Jeremy Michael Boorda ===
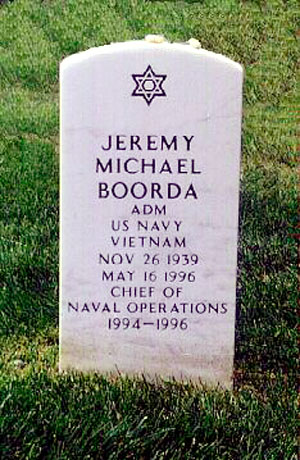
Boorda's headstone at Arlington National Cemetery located at Section 64, Lot 7101, Grid MM-17

Jeremy Michael Boorda (1939–1996) was an admiral of the United States Navy and the 25th Chief of Naval Operations (CNO). Boorda is the only CNO to have risen to the position from the enlisted ranks. He was born on November 26, 1939, in South Bend, Indiana, to a Jewish family. He grew up in Chicago, Illinois. He dropped out of high school when he was seventeen years old and joined the Navy. This was the beginning of his naval career of 40 years. Boorda kept his Jewish roots private: "Although Boorda was not a practicing Jew and in fact raised his children as Protestants, he was born to two Jewish parents and had a bar mitzvah. He did not in any way emphasize his Jewish roots or his Jewishness, said Rabbi Aaron Landes, a retired U.S. Navy rear admiral ... virtually no one knew that Boorda, who became the first enlisted man to rise to the Navy's highest post of chief of naval operations, was born a Jew ... Among Boorda's ancestors were a cantor and a Chasidic family, Landes said."

Boorda believed that "people should have the opportunity to excel, and be all they can be, even if they don't get a perfect or traditional start." He committed suicide at the age of 57 in 1996. He was disturbed by pending questions about Vietnam War combat ribbons he wore; he had not had service there and was not entitled to wear them. Researchers have noted that "the most important reason that no one paid attention to Boorda's Jewish background was that ... being Jewish is no longer an issue in the military."

== Jews and the United States Merchant Marine ==
On February 7, 1943 the troopship USS Henry R. Mallory was torpedoed by U-402. Among those lost was Ships Surgeon Dr. Joseph Grabenstein age 65.

== Secretaries of Defense ==
=== James R. Schlesinger ===
James Rodney Schlesinger (1929-2014) served as US Secretary of Defense from 1973 to 1975 under Presidents Richard Nixon and Gerald Ford. He became America's first Secretary of Energy under Jimmy Carter. While Secretary of Defense, he opposed amnesty for draft resisters, and pressed for development of more sophisticated nuclear weapon systems. Additionally, his support for the A-10 and the lightweight fighter program (later the F-16) helped ensure that they were carried to completion. Schlesinger was born in New York City, the son of Rhea Lillian, a Russian Jewish immigrant, and Julius Schlesinger, an Austrian Jew. In 1960 he published The Political Economy of National Security. In 1963 he moved to the Rand Corporation, where he worked until 1969, in the later years as director of strategic studies.

=== Harold Brown ===
Harold Brown (1927-2019) was U.S. Secretary of Defense from 1977 to 1981 in the cabinet of President Jimmy Carter. Brown is a Jewish American born in New York City to Gertrude Cohen and A. H. Brown. He had previously served in the Lyndon Johnson administration as Director of Defense Research and Engineering and Secretary of the Air Force. While Secretary of Defense, he insisted in laying the groundwork for the Camp David Accords. He took part in the strategic arms negotiations with the Soviet Union and supported (unsuccessfully), ratification of the SALT II treaty. He advocated détente with the Soviet Union.

=== William Cohen ===
William Sebastian Cohen (b. 1940) was a Republican who served as Secretary of Defense (1997–2001) under Democratic President Bill Clinton. His father, Reuben Cohen, was a Russian Jewish immigrant, while his mother, Clara, was of Protestant Irish ancestry; the two owned the Bangor Rye Bread Co. Cohen attended Hebrew school as a child. When he was told that he would have to undergo a conversion ceremony (see Matrilineality in Judaism), however, he decided not to follow through with his Bar Mitzvah. Instead, he followed his mother's example in refusing to convert to Judaism and became a Christian, specifically within the Unitarian Universalist tradition.

== Intelligence ==
=== Intelligence work serving America ===
There have been notable examples of those who have risen in the service of American intelligence and national security. Some notable examples have been the following:

==== Henry Kissinger ====
Henry Alfred Kissinger (1923-2023) was a German-born Jewish American political scientist, diplomat, and recipient of the Nobel Peace Prize. He served as the eighth US National Security Advisor (1969–1975) and later concurrently as the fifty sixth US Secretary of State (1973–1977) in the administrations of Presidents Richard Nixon and Gerald Ford. After his term, his opinion was still sought out by many following presidents.

Kissinger was born Heinz Alfred Kissinger in Fürth, Bavaria, Weimar Republic to a family of German Jews. His father, Louis Kissinger (1887–1982) was a schoolteacher. His mother, Paula Stern Kissinger (1901–1998), was a homemaker. The surname Kissinger was adopted in 1817 by his great-great-grandfather Meyer Löb, after the city of Bad Kissingen. In 1938, fleeing Nazi persecution, his family moved to New York. He never lost his pronounced Frankish accent, due to childhood shyness that made him hesitant to speak.

A proponent of Realpolitik, Kissinger played a dominant role in United States foreign policy between 1969 and 1977. During this period, he pioneered the policy of détente with the Soviet Union, orchestrated the opening of relations with the People's Republic of China, and negotiated the Paris Peace Accords, ending American involvement in the Vietnam War. His role in the bombing of Cambodia and other American interventions abroad during this period remains controversial.

==== John M. Deutch ====
John Mark Deutch (b. 1938) was the United States Deputy Secretary of Defense from 1994 to 1995 and Director of Central Intelligence (DCI) from May 10, 1995 until December 14, 1996. Deutch was born in Brussels, Belgium, to a Russian Jewish father.

== Special Forces/Special Missions units ==
Lawrence N. Freedman, Sergeant Major, United States Army enlisted in the Army on September 30, 1965. He served for over 25 years and in a number of conflicts. After earning his green beret, he was shipped to Vietnam, where time and time again he distinguished himself under fire. In 1978 he joined the Army's newly formed counterterrorist group Operational Detachment D (better known as Delta Force). In 1980, while serving with Delta Force, Freedman was directly involved in the ill-fated Iranian hostage rescue attempt. He left Delta Force in October 1982. Over the next two years, he was involved in a number of "special projects" and obtained the rank of sergeant major. He briefly considered working as a mercenary for the MOSSAD, and eventually joined the CIA. Freedman was killed on December 22, 1992 working as a CIA paramilitary officer. He was killed when his vehicle hit a land mine. His wife Teresa was told that he had driven over a Russian-built mine near the town of Bardera, Somalia. The blast had caused severe head trauma, blown off his lower right leg and opened his chest. He helped train the Delta Force from 1986 to 1990, when he retired from the Army and joined the CIA's Counter-Terrorism unit. A colorful character, he nicknamed himself "SuperJew".

== Chaplaincy ==
The United States military has a long-standing tradition of supporting Jewish military chaplains in all sectors. Chaplains are drawn from all Jewish denominations including Reform, Conservative, and Orthodox Judaism.

The Board of Delegates of American Israelites, organized in 1859 shortly before the Civil War, was the first American civic defense organization for Jews.

=== Civil War ===
On July 22, 1861, the North's Congress passed legislature requiring all chaplains to be ordained Christian ministers, making rabbis ineligible to serve. The Board of Delegates of American Israelites lobbied the government and organized a petition drive to change the law. On July 12, 1862, Congress reversed itself and changed the law to permit non-Christian clergy to serve as chaplains. In Bangor, Maine, 200 non-Jews signed the petition, although only three Jews lived in the community. Rabbi Jacob Frankel of Philadelphia was the first rabbi appointed as a military chaplain.

The following are the official insignia of Jewish chaplains in the US military:

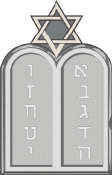
US Army Jewish chaplain insignia

US Air Force Jewish chaplain insignia

=== JWB Jewish Chaplains Council ===
The JWB (Jewish Welfare Board) Jewish Chaplains Council was founded in 1917 as the Chaplains' Committee of the Jewish Welfare Board. It is an agency of the Jewish Community Center (JCC) association, and serves as the endorsing body for Jewish military chaplains who serve in the US Armed Forces and VA chaplaincy services.

The JWB Jewish Chaplains Council consists of sixteen rabbis, four each from the Rabbinical Assembly (Conservative), the Rabbinical Council of America (Orthodox), and the Central Conference of American Rabbis (Reform), plus four active duty Jewish chaplains representing the Chaplains Advisory Group (CAG). As of 2010, the Council serves approximately 37 full-time Jewish military and Veterans Administration chaplains, 55 chaplain reservists, more than 88 military lay leaders, and thousands of Jews at more than 500 military installations and VA medical centers.

=== World War II ===
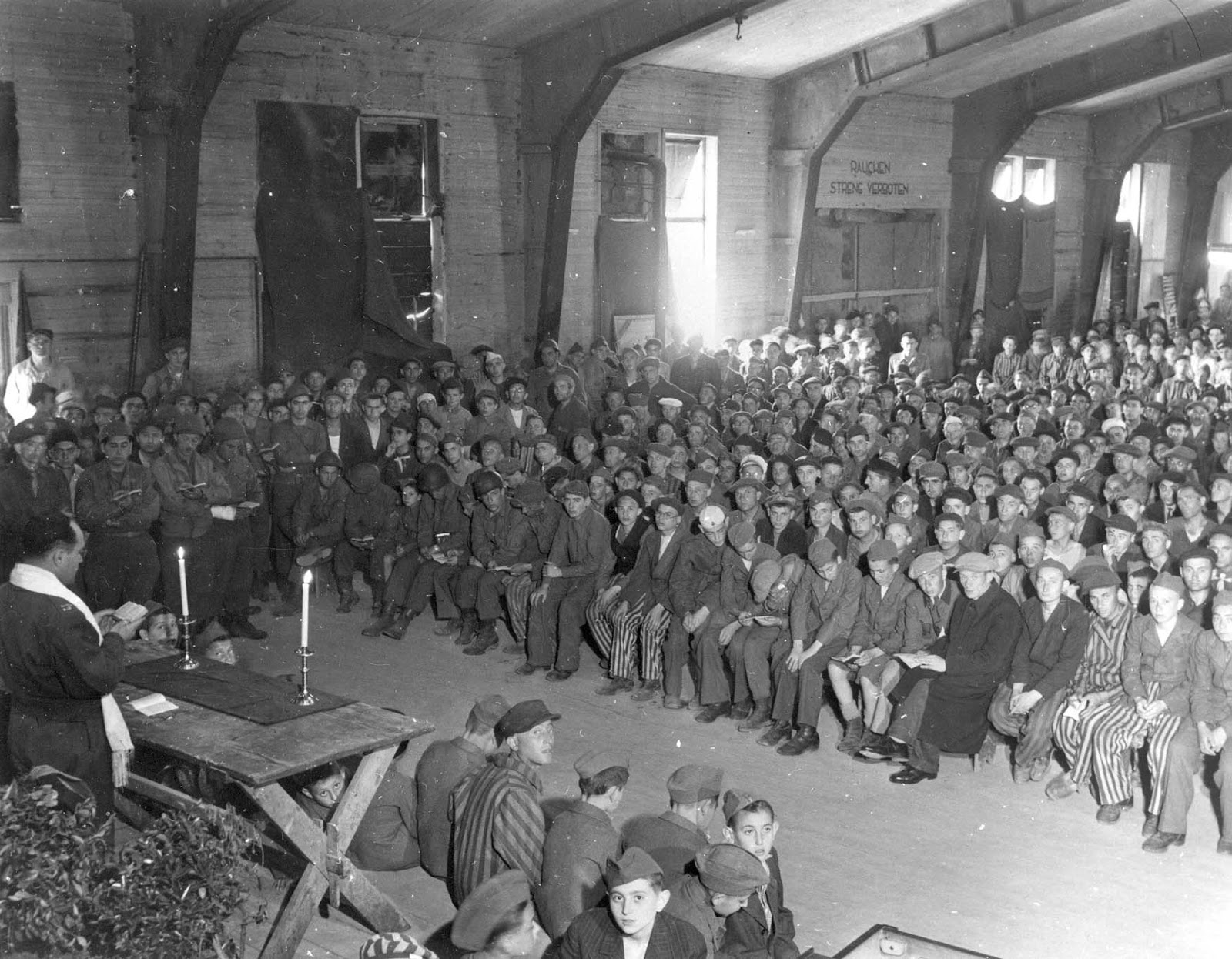
American chaplain Rabbi Herschel Schacter conducts religious services at the liberated Buchenwald concentration camp in 1945.

Many Jewish chaplains served with honor during World War II. For example, Rabbi Herschel Schacter was a chaplain in the Third Army's VIII Corps. and was the first US Army Chaplain to enter and participate in the liberation of the Buchenwald concentration camp in 1945 and later aided in the resettlement of displaced persons. There were a total of 311 rabbis in service, of whom 147 were Reform, 96 were Conservative, and 68 were modern Orthodox. Before they could serve, the US Military sent their chaplains through training at American universities, and a significant part of this training was fostering relationships between men of different faiths. Those who practiced Protestantism, Catholicism, and Judaism shared rooms with one another, encouraging peaceful relations. Throughout this preparation for service, these future chaplains learned that their personal beliefs were never to be professed to the soldiers who would come to them seeking religious counsel.

=== Post-World War II ===
President Ronald Reagan reads Jewish Chaplain Rabbi Arnold Resnicoff's report of the 1983 Beirut barracks bombing as keynote address for the Rev. Jerry Falwell's conference, "Baptist Fundamentalism '84."

Jewish Chaplain Rabbi Arnold E. Resnicoff's eye-witness report of the 1983 Beirut barracks bombing had historical importance for two reasons. First, four days after the attack, then-Vice president George H. W. Bush led a White House team to visit the scene of the attack, and asked Resnicoff—then one of the chaplains for the U.S. Sixth Fleet—to write a report for president Ronald Reagan. Resnicoff had arrived in Beirut on Friday, October 21, to lead a memorial service for a young Marine killed by sniper fire (then only the fifth death of American forces present as part of the international peace-keeping force). He refused to accept transportation back to Sixth Fleet Headquarters in Gaeta, Italy the next day because it was Shabbat, the Jewish Sabbath, and so ended up being on the scene the morning of October 23, when the attack occurred. When Reagan received the report, he decided to use it as his keynote speech to the 20,000 attendees of the "Baptist Fundamentalist '84" convention, led by Rev. Jerry Falwell. Rabbi David Lapp, then-Director of the National Jewish Welfare Board Commission on Jewish Chaplaincy, said that many rabbis had quoted Presidents, but that this may have been the first time in history that a president had quoted a rabbi—certainly, the first time that an entire speech of a president was attributed to a rabbi.

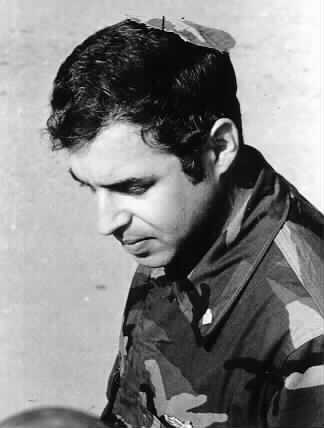
Jewish Chaplain Arnold Resnicoff, wearing the makeshift "camouflage kippa" made for him by Catholic chaplain (Fr.) George Pucciarelli, after his had become bloodied when it was used to wipe the face of a wounded Marine

Secondly, one story from the aftermath of the attack was instrumental in terms of changing military policies regarding the wearing of kippot, head-coverings, for Jews in uniform. The "religious apparel amendment," allowing kippot, had twice failed to pass. But during the rescue efforts following the bombing, Catholic Chaplain Fr. George Pucciarelli tore a piece of his camouflage uniform off to use as a makeshift kippa for Resnicoff, who had discarded his kippa when it became blood-soaked after being used to wipe the faces of wounded Marines. When that story was read into the Congressional Record, both the Senate and House passed the Religious Apparel Amendment, which then laid the groundwork for Department of Defense Directive (now Instruction) 1300.17, "Accommodation of Religious Practices Within the Military Service."

This story of the "camouflage kippah" was retold at many levels, in addition to Reagan's speech, including another event involving a meeting between Reagan and the "American Friends of Lubavitch." During the group's visit to the White House, Reagan recounted the Beirut story, and then asked the rabbis to explain to him the religious meaning of the kippah. Rabbi Abraham Shemtov, the leader of the group, responded, "Mr. President, the kippah to us is a sign of reverence." Rabbi Feller, another member of the group, continued, "We place the kippah on the very highest point of our being—on our head, the vessel of our intellect—to tell ourselves and the world that there is something which is above man's intellect: the infinite Wisdom of God."

=== Naval Academy Jewish Chapel ===
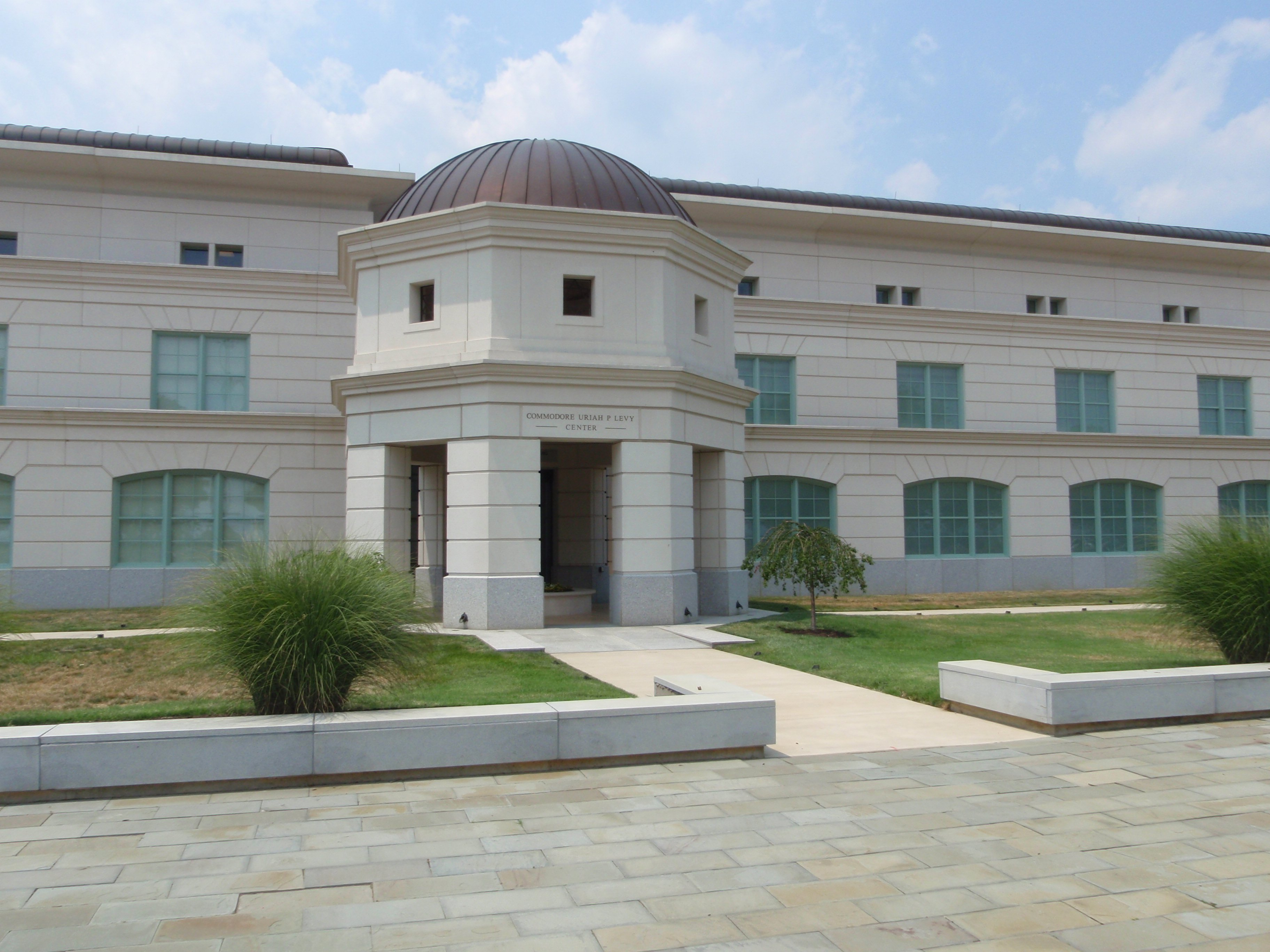
Commodore Uriah P. Levy Center and Jewish Chapel at the US Naval Academy, in Annapolis, Maryland

The Naval Academy Jewish Chapel, also known as the Commodore Uriah P. Levy Center and Jewish Chapel is the Jewish chapel at the United States Naval Academy, in Annapolis, Maryland. The center is named in honor of Commodore Uriah P. Levy (1792–1862), the first Jewish commodore in the United States Navy, who is famous for refusing to flog his sailors. The Levy Center contains a 410-seat synagogue, fellowship hall, Character Learning Center, classrooms, Brigade's social director offices, academic board, and the Academy's Honor Board.

The Levy Center cost $8 million. Approximately $1.8 million was paid for with military construction funds. The remaining amount was paid for by private donations raised by the Friends of the Jewish Chapel, headed by Jewish alumni of the academy and others. It was given to the Academy upon completion. The building was dedicated in September 2005.

== Jewish War Veterans of the United States of America ==
The Jewish War Veterans of the United States of America is an American Jewish veterans' organization, and the oldest veterans group in the United States. It has an estimated 37,000 members.

The Jewish War Veterans were established in 1896. The group holds a congressional charter under Title 36 of the United States Code.

In the preamble to its National Constitution the purpose of the JWV is stated:

To maintain true allegiance to the United States of America; to foster and perpetuate true Americanism; to combat whatever tends to impair the efficiency and permanency of our free institutions; to uphold the fair name of the Jew and fight his or her battles wherever unjustly assailed; to encourage the doctrine of universal liberty, equal rights, and full justice to all men and women; to combat the powers of bigotry and darkness wherever originating and whatever their target; to preserve the spirit of comradeship by mutual helpfulness to comrades and their families; to cooperate with and support existing educational institutions and establish educational institutions, and to foster the education of ex-servicemen and ex-servicewomen, and our members in the ideals and principles of Americanism; to instill love of country and flag, and to promote sound minds and bodies in our members and our youth; to preserve the memories and records of patriotic service performed by the men and women of our faith; to honor their memory and shield from neglect the graves of our heroic dead.

== National Museum of American Jewish Military history ==
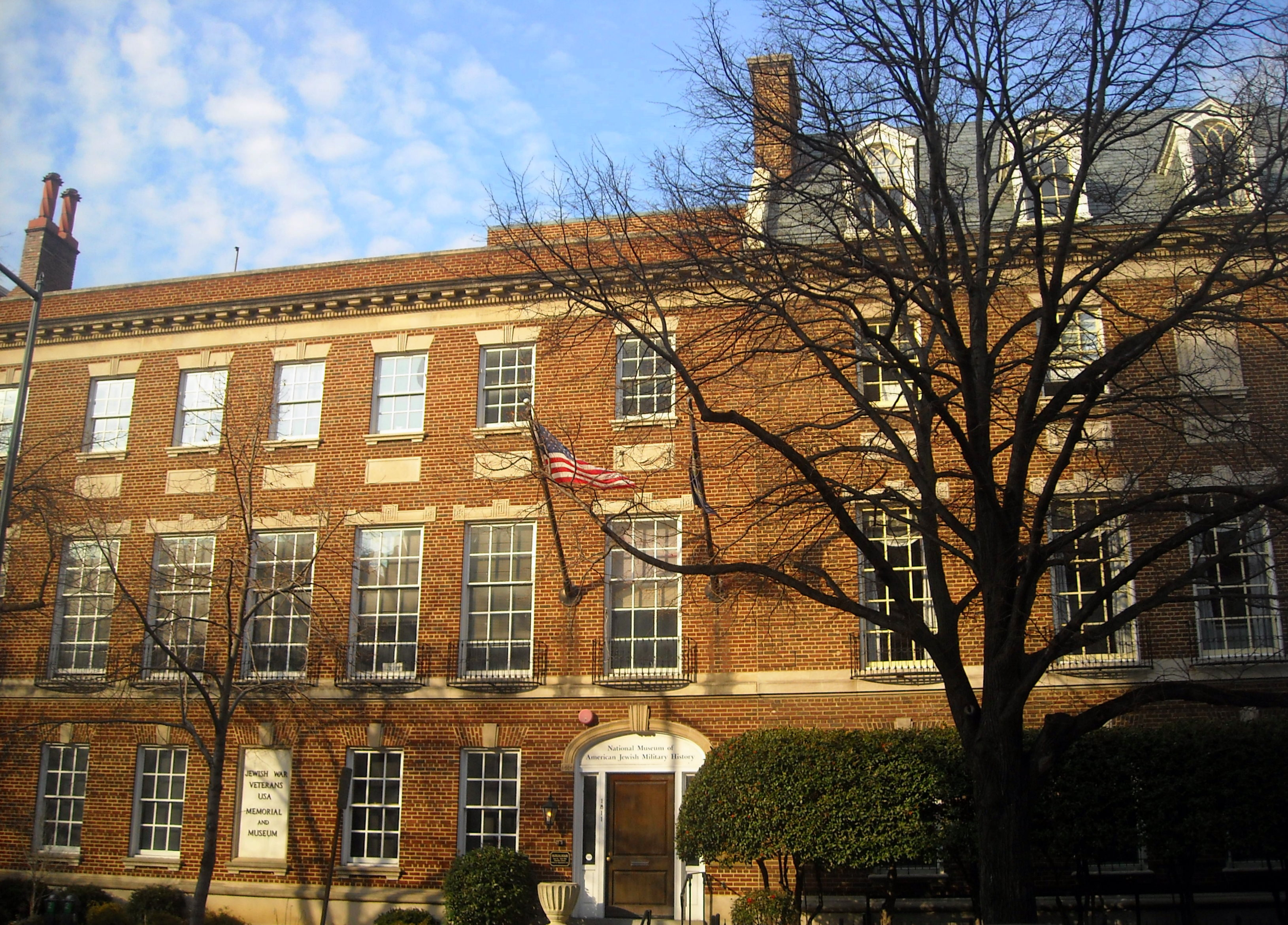
Building of the National Museum of American Jewish Military History

The National Museum of American Jewish Military History (NMAJMH), founded in 1958, is in Washington, D.C., documents and preserves "the contributions of Jewish Americans to the peace and freedom of the United States ... [and to educate] the public concerning the courage, heroism and sacrifices made by Jewish Americans who served in the armed forces."

The museum operates under the auspices of the Jewish War Veterans (JWV), USA, National Memorial, Inc. (NMI), located at 1811 R St., NW, Washington, DC, in the Dupont Circle area. The building also houses the JWV National Headquarters.

== Misconceptions of Jewish service ==
The early history of Jewish service was complicated by American assumptions that Jews were unwilling or unable to serve in the military. This perception was to last for centuries, and it was in response to an 1891 article in the North American Review regarding the perceived lack of Jews in the military that historian Simon Wolf compiled his 1895 work The American Jew as patriot, soldier and citizen.

This perception was so widespread and long-lasting that author Mark Twain, in his 1899 article Concerning the Jews, criticized the American Jews for their lack of patriotism and their lack of willingness to serve. However, when he was presented with statistics which proved that Jews served in the armed forces of the United States throughout America's military history, Twain withdrew his remark, and he contradicted the misperception in his 1904 The American Jew as Soldier.

== Religious practices during World War II ==
During World War II, Jewish American soldiers were able to perform religious practices overseas while in service. Men brought their tefillin into battle, had the Passover seder, albeit unceremoniously and untraditionally, along with other important Jewish services. Worship was conducted in public or wherever it was possible during the conflict. For these worship services, a Jewish prayer book that was approved by Conservative, Reform, and Orthodox rabbis was created. This book's creation made worship as accessible as possible during turbulent times. CANRA, also known as the Committee on Army and Navy Religious Activities, established a committee of rabbis of the Conservative, Reform, and Orthodox denominations that served to guide the chaplains and answer their questions surrounding worship during the war.

== See also ==
- Antisemitism in the United States
- History of the Jews in the United States
- Jewish Institute for National Security Affairs
- Jewish military history
- List of Jewish Americans in the military
- List of Jewish Medal of Honor recipients
- United States military chaplain symbols

== Bibliography ==
- Evans, Eli N., Judah Benjamin: The Jewish Confederate, New York: The Free Press, 1988.
- Hart, Charles Spencer. General Washington's Son of Israel and Other Forgotten Heroes of History. ISBN 0-8369-1296-9
- Schwartz, Laurens R. Jews and the American Revolution: Haym Solomon and Others, Jefferson, North Carolina: McFarland & Co., 1987.
