= Suhler =

Suhler is a surname. Notable people with the surname include:

- Jim Suhler (born 1960), American Texas Blues guitarist
- Simon Suhler (1844–1895), private in the United States Army
