= List of Jewish Medal of Honor recipients =

The Medal of Honor was created during the American Civil War and is the highest military decoration presented by the United States to a member of its armed forces. Recipients must distinguish themselves at the risk of their own life above and beyond the call of duty in action against an enemy of the United States. The medal is presented to the recipient by the President of the United States.

Since it was instituted there have been 3,473 recipients; at least 17 American Jews have received the Medal of Honor (Note: Different sources give different numbers and names of recipients; 29 different recipients are identified as Jewish Americans in the differing references not counting the various aliases used by many of them.) for their actions starting in the American Civil War through the Vietnam War. The first recipient of the medal was Benjamin B. Levy of the 1st New York Volunteer infantry for his service at the Battle of Glendale on June 30, 1862. The citation for his medal read: This soldier, a drummer boy, took the gun of a sick comrade, went into the fight, and when the color bearers were shot down, carried the colors and saved them from capture. He was only seventeen years old when he earned his medal. David Orbansky also received it for his actions in 1863 during the American Civil War. Samuel Gross was the only Jewish American Marine to receive the medal for his actions in Fort Riviere, Haiti. During World War II, dentist Benjamin L. Salomon is credited with killing 98 Japanese soldiers to cover for the retreat of wounded American soldiers. After repeated recommendations, he was posthumously granted the medal in 2002, 58 years after he was killed in action. The last to receive it was Tibor Rubin in 2005, who was believed to have been overlooked due to discrimination. His medal was for his actions in the Korean War in 1950, 55 years before he received the medal.

== American Jews and the Medal of Honor ==
Depending on religious definitions and varying population data, the United States currently has the second largest Jewish community in the world (after Israel). The American Jewish population was estimated to be approximately 5,128,000 (1.7%) (Note: "US Census Bureau Statistical Abstract" (PDF). Table 74, 2007 U.S. Religious Landscape Survey. The Pew Forum on Religion & Public Life, Washington, DC. February 2008. Archived from the original (PDF) on June 28, 2011. For persons 18 years or older, based on the Religious Landscape Survey, a survey conducted in the summer of 2007.) of the total population in 2008 (304,060,000). However, it may be as high as 6,444,000 (2.2%). (Note: "US Census Bureau Statistical Abstract" (PDF). Table 76. Central Bureau of Statistics. 2009. Archived from the original (PDF) on October 13, 2012. Christian Church Adherents, 2000, and Jewish Population, 2007—States. The Jewish population includes Jews who define themselves as Jewish by religion as well as those who define themselves as Jewish in cultural terms. Data on Jewish population are based primarily on a compilation of individual estimates made by local Jewish federations (as reported in the American Jewish Yearbook).) As a contrast, Israel's Central Bureau of Statistics estimated the Israeli Jewish population was 5,435,800 in 2007.

The medal is bestowed "for conspicuous gallantry and intrepidity at the risk of life, above and beyond the call of duty, in actual combat against an armed enemy force" and the recipient must have distinguished themselves at the risk of their own life above and beyond the call of duty in action against an enemy of the United States. Due to the nature of this medal, it is commonly presented posthumously.

Until 1914 the Medal of Honor and the Purple Heart were the only medals that could be received so prior to 1916 the criteria for the Medal of Honor were much less restrictive than it is today. In 1916 however a board was established to ensure that future awards would be made only for the highest purposes, and some awards were rescinded.

Since the institution of the Medal of Honor, at least 17 have been presented to American Jews, of which four were received posthumously.

== American Civil War ==
The American Civil War was a major conflict fought between the federal government of the United States and eleven of its member States which sought to secede and to create their own government, the Confederate States of America. It started on April 12, 1861, shortly after Abraham Lincoln was elected President of the United States, and ended four years later on April 9, 1865. During the war over 10,000 military engagements took place and more than 3 million people fought on both sides with 40% of the battles being fought in the states of Virginia and Tennessee.

Since its creation, 1522 servicemen have received the Medal of Honor for actions during the American Civil War and depending on sources, at least four were Jewish.

Note: Notes in quotations are derived or are copied from the official Medal of Honor citation

Image	Name	Service	Rank	Place of action	Date of action	Notes	References
—	Abraham Cohn	Army	Sergeant Major	Battle of the Wilderness and Battle of the Crater, Virginia	May 6, 1864 and Jul 30, 1864	"During Battle of the Wilderness rallied and formed, under heavy fire, disorganized and fleeing troops of different regiments. At Petersburg, Virginia, bravely and coolly carried orders to the advanced line under severe fire."	
—	Leopold Karpeles	Army	Sergeant	Battle of the Wilderness, Virginia	May 6, 1864	"While color bearer, rallied the retreating troops and induced them to check the enemy's advance"	
	Benjamin Levy	Army	Private	Battle of Glendale, Virginia	Jun 30, 1862	Drummer boy, took the gun of a sick comrade and went into the fight, when the color bearers were shot down he carried the colors and saved them from capture.	
—	David Orbansky	Army	Private	Shiloh, Tennessee, Vicksburg, Mississippi	1862 and 1863	"Gallantry in actions"	

== Indian Wars ==
Indian Wars is the name generally used in the United States to describe a series of conflicts between the colonial or federal government and the native people of North America. The wars, which ranged from the 17th-century to the early 1900s, generally resulted in the opening of Native American lands to further colonization, the conquest of American Indians and their assimilation, or forced relocation to Indian reservations.

From the time the Medal of Honor was created during the American Civil War, through the end of the Indian Wars there were 426 recipients who received it for actions in one of the Indian Wars, including one American Jew, Simon Suhler, who received it under the name Charles Gardner.

Note: Notes in quotations are derived or are copied from the official Medal of Honor citation

Image	Name	Service	Rank	Place of action	Date of action	Notes	References
—	Simon Suhler	Army	Private	Arizona	Aug 1868 – Oct 1868	Enlisted under the name Charles Gardner; "Bravery in scouts and actions against Indians"	

== Haiti ==
In 1915 Haiti saw several bloody changes in Government leadership and the result was an unstable and dangerous environment for American citizens, business and interests. After a citizen led revolt overthrew and killed the brutal new dictator General Vilbrun Guillaume Sam within 6 months of seizing power President Woodrow Wilson ordered the United States Marines to restore order and protect American property and lives. When the Marines arrived they began engaging the rebel Cacos and in a battle that ended at Fort Riviere, Haiti and resulting in hand-to-hand combat, the Cacos were eliminated. After the battle six Marines received the Medal of Honor for their actions including Dan Daly, Smedley Butler and the only Jewish Marine to ever receive the Medal, Samuel Marguiles, who received it under the name Samuel Gross.

Note: Notes in quotations are derived or are copied from the official Medal of Honor citation

Image	Name	Service	Rank	Place of action	Date of action	Notes	References
—	Samuel Gross	Marine Corps	Private	Fort Riviere, Haiti	Nov 17, 1915	Also known as Samuel Marguiles; "was the second man to pass through the breach [in the fort's walls] in the face of constant fire from the Cacos and, thereafter, for a 10-minute period, engaged the enemy in desperate hand-to-hand combat".	

== World War I ==
When World War I broke out, the United States initially maintained a policy of isolationism, avoiding conflict while trying to negotiate peace between the warring nations. However, when a German U-boat sank the British liner Lusitania in 1915, with 128 Americans aboard, U.S. President Woodrow Wilson vowed, "America isn't too proud to fight" and demanded an end to attacks on passenger ships. Germany complied and Wilson unsuccessfully tried to mediate a settlement. He repeatedly warned that the U.S. would not tolerate unrestricted submarine warfare, in violation of international law. In 1917, three years after the first shots of the war were fired, the United States entered the war and by the end of the conflict more than 4.7 million American soldiers, sailors and Marines would fight in the war.

More than 250,000 Jewish Americans served in the armed forces during the war with more than 3,000 killed in action and another 12,000 gassed or wounded.

One hundred twenty four people would eventually receive the Medal for their actions during the war, four of them Jewish. One of them, William Sawelson, received it posthumously, when he was killed by a machine gun attempting to assist another injured soldier.

This along with * indicates that the Medal of Honor was awarded posthumously

Note: Notes in quotations are derived or are copied from the official Medal of Honor citation

Image	Name	Service	Rank	Place of action	Date of action	Notes	References
	Sydney G. Gumpertz	Army	First Sergeant	Bois-de-Forges, France	Sep 29, 1918	"Gumpertz left the platoon of which he was in command and started, with two other soldiers, through a heavy barrage toward the machine gun nest. His two companions soon became casualties from bursting shells, but 1st Sgt. Gumpertz continued on alone in the face of direct fire from the machine gun, jumped into the nest and silenced the gun, capturing nine of the crew."	
	Benjamin Kaufman	Army	First Sergeant	Forest of Argonne, France	Oct 4, 1918	"He took out a patrol for the purpose of attacking an enemy machine gun which had checked the advance of his company. Before reaching the gun he became separated from his patrol and a machine gun bullet shattered his right arm. Without hesitation he advanced on the gun alone, throwing grenades with his left hand and charging with an empty pistol, taking one prisoner and scattering the crew, bringing the gun and prisoner back to the first-aid station."	
	William Sawelson*	Army	Sergeant	Grand-Pre, France	Oct 26, 1918	"Hearing a wounded man in a shell hole some distance away calling for water, Sgt. Sawelson, upon his own initiative, left shelter and crawled through heavy machine gun fire to where the man lay, giving him what water he had in his canteen. He then went back to his own shell hole, obtained more water, and was returning to the wounded man when he was killed by a machine gun bullet."	
	William Shemin	Army	Sergeant	Vesle River, France	Aug 9, 1918	"Sergeant Shemin distinguished himself by acts of gallantry and intrepidity above and beyond the call of duty while serving as a Rifleman with G Company, 2d Battalion, 47th Infantry Regiment, 4th Division, American Expeditionary Forces, in connection with combat operations against an armed enemy on the Vesle River, near Bazoches, France from August 7 to August 9, 1918. Sergeant Shemin left cover and crossed open space, repeatedly exposing himself to heavy machine-gun and rifle fire, to rescue the wounded. After officers and senior noncommissioned officers had become casualties, Sergeant Shemin took command of the platoon and displayed great initiative under fire until wounded on August 9. Sergeant Shemin's extraordinary heroism and selflessness, above and beyond the call of duty, are in keeping with the highest traditions of the military service and reflect great credit upon himself, his unit, and the United States Army."	

== World War II ==
During World War II 16.1 million American service members served and more than 650,000 of them were Jewish American men and women. More than 50,000 American Jews received medals during the war including four Medals of Honor.

Among the recipients were four Jewish Americans, Isadore S. Jachman, Ben L. Salomon, Tony Stein and Raymond Zussman who all received it posthumously. Jachman and Salomon were both killed attempting to assist other fallen soldiers; Zussman's medal was received for risking his life on September 12, 1944, but he was killed less than a month later before receiving it. Stein's medal was received for gallantry when assaulting enemy pillboxes on Iwo Jima, he was killed on the island a week after his Medal of Honor action.

This along with * indicates that the Medal of Honor was awarded posthumously

Note: Notes in quotations are derived or are copied from the official Medal of Honor citation

Image	Name	Service	Rank	Place of action	Date of action	Notes	References
	Isadore S. Jachman*	Army	Staff Sergeant	Flamierge, Belgium	Jan 4, 1945	"[L]eft his place of cover and with total disregard for his own safety dashed across open ground through a hail of fire, seizing a bazooka from a fallen comrade and advanced on the tanks, which concentrated their fire on him. Firing the weapon alone, he damaged one and forced both to retire."	
Ben L. Salomon	Ben L. Salomon*	Army	Captain	Battle of Saipan, Mariana Islands	Jul 7, 1944	While serving as a surgeon, Japanese troops started overrunning his hospital. Captain Salomon stood a rear-guard position in which he had no hope of personal survival, allowing the safe evacuation of the wounded, killing as many as 98 enemy troops before being killed himself.	
Raymond Zussman	Raymond Zussman*	Army	Second Lieutenant	Noroy-le-Bourg, France	Sep 12, 1944	"[R]econnoitered alone on foot far in advance of his remaining tank and the infantry ... Fully exposed to fire from enemy positions only 50 yards distant, he stood by his tank directing its fire ... Again he walked before his tank, leading it against an enemy-held group of houses, machinegun and small arms fire kicking up dust at his feet. ... Going on alone, he disappeared around a street corner. The fire of his carbine could be heard and in a few minutes he reappeared driving 30 prisoners before him."	
Raymond Zussman	Tony Stein*	Marines	Corporal	Iwo Jima, Bonin Islands	Feb 19, 1945	Armed with a personally improvised man-portable aircraft machine gun, Stein charged Japanese pillboxes 1 by 1 and succeeded in killing 20 of the enemy single-handedly. Under enemy fire, he exhausted all his bullets at the enemy and ran back to replenish ammo eight times. He then directed fire of a half-track against a pillbox until it was destroyed. "Later in the day, although his weapon was twice shot from his hands, he personally covered the withdrawal of his platoon to the company position."	

== Korean War ==
When Korea was split into two separate countries, North and South, along the 38th parallel tensions between the two countries were worsened when other countries began to get involved on both sides. The communist country of North Korea was supported by Russia, China and others, while the democratic South was supported by the United Nations and the United States. In 1950 the United States got involved and over the next three years more than 1.5 million US service members would serve in Korea. During the three years of the war 133 Medals of Honor were presented and although more than 150,000 Jewish American men and women were serving in Korea at that time, not one received the Medal of Honor.

On July 23, 1950 Tibor Rubin was serving as a rifleman in Korea when his unit was forced to retreat and he was ordered to stay behind and keep the road open for the withdrawing unit. During the 24-hour battle he single-handedly fought off an overwhelming number of North Korean troops, inflicting severe casualties on the attacking unit and assisted in the capture of many prisoners. A few months later Chinese forces staged a night-time assault on his unit and Rubin manned a machine gun allowing the unit to retreat southward, again inflicting heavy casualties on the attacking unit. During the battle he was severely wounded and was eventually captured by Chinese forces. Although the Chinese offered to release him early and return him to his native Hungary, he refused, remaining a prisoner and risking his life repeatedly by sneaking out at night to get food and medical supplies for other wounded prisoners.

A 1993 study commissioned by the United States Army to investigate racial discrimination in the awarding of medals. During the investigation it was determined that one Veteran American Jew and Holocaust survivor, Tibor Rubin, had been the subject of discrimination due to his religion and should have received the Medal of Honor. In 2005, 55 years later, President George W. Bush presented the Medal of Honor to Rubin in a ceremony at the White House, for his actions in 1950 during the Korean War.

Image	Name	Service	Rank	Place of action	Date of action	Notes	References
	Leonard M. Kravitz*	Army	Private First Class	Yangpyong, South Korea	Mar 6, 1951	"On March 6 and 7, 1951, Kravitz' unit's positions at Yangpyong were overrun by the enemy. Kravitz voluntarily manned a machine-gun position, forcing the enemy to direct its efforts against him and helping his comrades to retreat at the cost of his own life."	
	Tibor Rubin	Army	Corporal	Republic of Korea	Jul 23, 1950 – Apr 20, 1953	During a 24-hour battle he slowed the advance of an assault of Chinese troops allowing other personnel with the 8th Cavalry Regiment to complete its withdrawal successfully. Although he was severely wounded in the battle and subsequently captured by Chinese forces he chose to remain in Chinese prison despite offers of an early release. While detained he risked his own safety by sneaking out at night and breaking into enemy food stores and gardens to find food for other soldiers and providing medical care to the sick and wounded prisoners.	

== Vietnam War ==
The Vietnam War was a military conflict between the Communist-supported Democratic Republic of Vietnam and the United States-supported Republic of Vietnam. It started in 1959 and concluded April 30, 1975 with the defeat and failure of the United States foreign policy in Vietnam.

During the Vietnam War, 246 Medals of Honor were received, 154 of them posthumously. Two American Jews received the Medal, Jack H. Jacobs from the Army and John Levitow from the Air Force.

Image	Name	Service	Rank	Place of action	Date of action	Notes	References
	Jack H. Jacobs	Army	First Lieutenant	Kien Phong Province, Republic of Vietnam	Mar 9, 1968	Although seriously wounded and bleeding profusely, he assumed command and ordered a withdrawal. He then repeatedly returned through heavy fire, to rescue other wounded including the company commander and treated their wounds. On three occasions he repelled Viet Cong squads who were also searching for wounded American soldiers in the same area, killing three and wounding several others.	
	John Levitow	Air Force	Airman First Class	Long Binh Army post, Republic of Vietnam	Feb 24, 1969	Although severely wounded himself from a mortar round, he moved another wounded crew member to safety. He then used his own body to smother and move a smoking flare from within the cargo compartment of the aircraft and threw it from the back of the plane as it separated and ignited in the air as it cleared the aircraft.	

== Operation Freedom Sentinel ==
Operation Freedom's Sentinel (OFS) was the official name used by the U.S. government for the mission succeeding Operation Enduring Freedom (OEF) in continuation of the War in Afghanistan as part of the larger global war on terrorism. Operation Freedom's Sentinel is part of the NATO-led Resolute Support Mission, which began on January 1, 2015. OFS had two components: counterterrorism and working with allies as part of Resolute Support.

Image	Name	Service	Rank	Place of action	Date of action	Notes	References
	Christopher Andrew Celiz*	Army	Sergeant First Class	Paktia Province, Afghanistan	Jul 12, 2018	Celiz placed himself directly between the cockpit and the enemy, ensuring the aircraft was able to depart. Upon the helicopter's liftoff, Celiz was hit by enemy fire. Fully aware of his injury, but understanding the peril to the aircraft, Celiz motioned to the pilots to depart rather than remain to load him. His selfless actions saved the life of the evacuated partnered force member and almost certainly prevented further casualties among other members of his team and the aircrew. Celiz died as a result of his actions.	

== See also ==
- List of Jewish Americans in the military
- Jewish American military history
