= Raymond Zussman =

American Medal of Honor recipient (1917–1944)

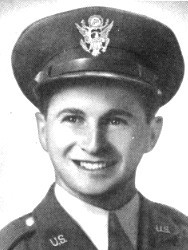
- Born: July 23, 1917; Hamtramck, Michigan, U.S.
- Died: September 21, 1944 (aged 27) near Noroy-le-Bourg, France
- Burial place: Machpelah Cemetery, Ferndale, Michigan
- Military career
- Allegiance: United States
- Branch: United States Army
- Service years: 1941–1944
- Rank: Second Lieutenant
- Unit: 756th Tank Battalion
- Conflicts: World War II
- Awards: Medal of Honor; Purple Heart; Army Good Conduct Medal; American Defense Service Medal; American Campaign Medal; European-African-Middle Eastern Campaign Medal; World War II Victory Medal

Raymond Zussman (July 23, 1917 – September 21, 1944) was a second lieutenant in the United States Army and a recipient of the United States military's highest decoration—the Medal of Honor—for his actions in France during World War II.

== Biography ==
Zussman was born July 23, 1917, in Hamtramck, Michigan to Nathan Zussman and Rebecca Leah. Raymound Zussman had seven siblings and his father ran a shoe store. Zussman as boy sang in his synagogue’s choir. He attended Central High School in Detroit. A boy of small stature, Zussman joined the high school football team despite his coach's skepticism. After graduating from high school, Zussman joined Teamsters Local 337 in Detroit, eventually rising to the position of shop steward at his place of employment. Zussman spent one year of college at Wayne State University and also took night classes in metallurgy.

In September 1941, Zussman joined the US Army. Prior to becoming a tank commander, Zussman was an instructor in street fighting at Fort Knox in Kentucky. In June 1943, he participated in the allied invasion of North Africa and after that the invasion of Italy. After being wounded at the battle of Monte Cassino in Italy, the Army offered Zussman a Headquarters position. Zussman declined, stating he wanted another front line position; he was then assigned to a tank unit in France.

By September 12, 1944, Zussman was serving as a second lieutenant, commanding tanks of the 756th Tank Battalion. On that day, during a battle in the city of Noroy-le-Bourg, France, Zussman repeatedly went forward alone to scout enemy positions and exposed himself to enemy fire while directing his tank's action, under Zussman's leadership 18 German soldiers were killed and another 92 were captured.

On September 21, 1944, nine days after the battle at Noroy-le-Bourg, Zussman was killed by a German mortar bomb blast.

On May 24, 1945, at a graduation ceremony at the United States Army Armor School (then located at Fort Knox) Zussman was posthumously awarded the Medal of Honor for his actions at Noroy-le-Bourg. Zussman's father gave a thank you address to the graduating class.

On June 6, 1949, Zussman was disinterred from a military cemetery and reburied in Machpelah Cemetery in Ferndale, Michigan. The city government of Detroit wanted Zussman to lie in state at Detroit City Hall, but Zussman's distraught father declined the honor, due to religious prohibitions.

== Memorials ==
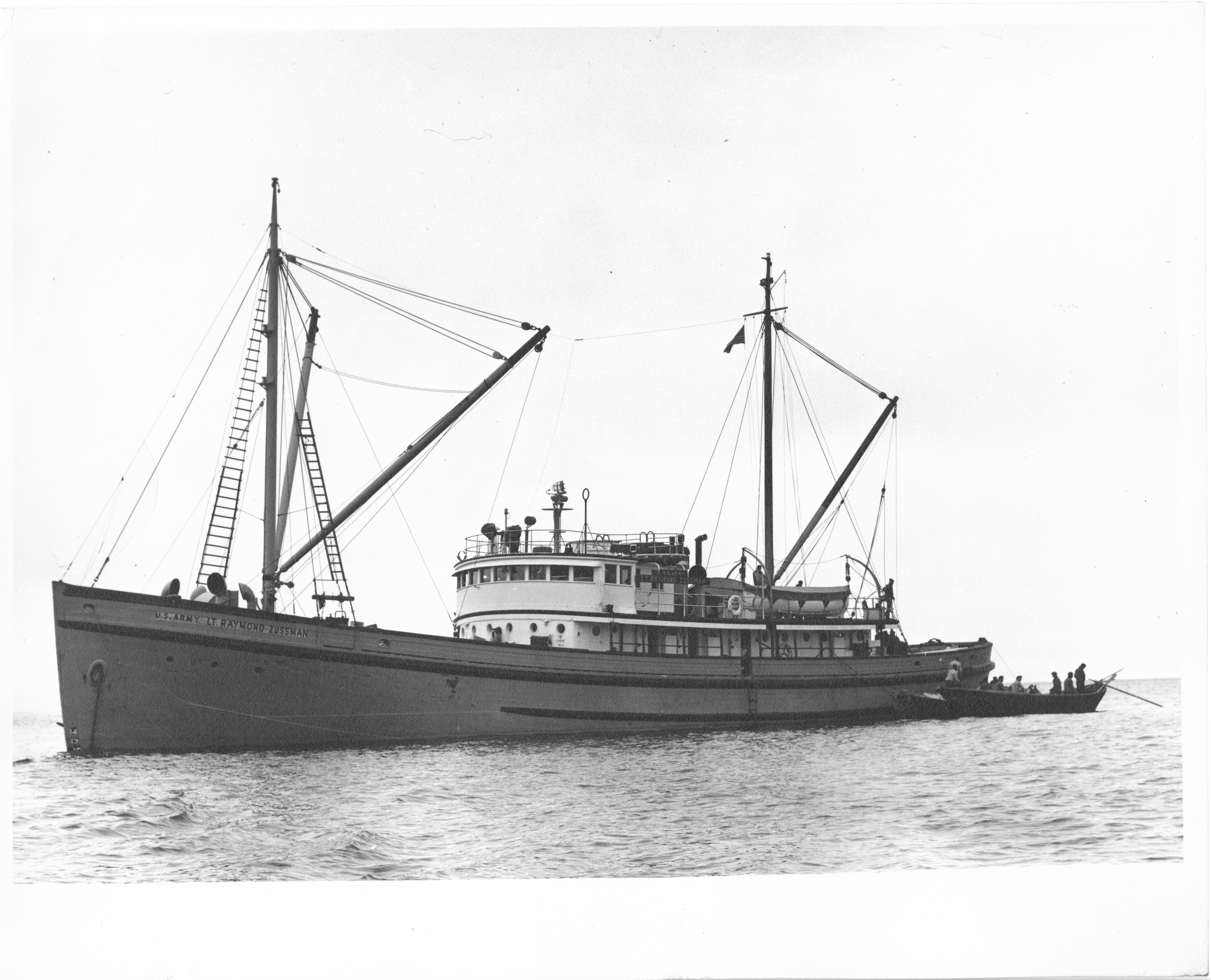
Lt. Raymond Zussman (FS-246)

In 1944, the U.S. Army launched Lt. Raymond Zussman (FS-246), a small wooden cargo ship named for Zussman.

In 1997, the Army started work on Zussman Village, a military operations in urban terrain (MOUT) training center for urban warfare at Fort Knox.

The Zussman Playground in Detroit is named after Raymond Zussman.

Zussman Park located in front of City Hall in Hamtramck, Michigan, is named after Raymond Zussman.

Raymond Zussman's story and Medal of Honor are on permanent display at the Michigan Heroes Museum in Frankenmuth, Michigan.

== Medal of Honor citation ==
Second Lieutenant Zussman's official Medal of Honor citation reads:

On 12 September 1944, 2d Lt. Zussman was in command of 2 tanks operating with an infantry company in the attack on enemy forces occupying the town of Noroy le Bourg, France. At 7 p.m., his command tank bogged down. Throughout the ensuing action, armed only with a carbine, he reconnoitered alone on foot far in advance of his remaining tank and the infantry. Returning only from time to time to designate targets, he directed the action of the tank and turned over to the infantry the numerous German soldiers he had caused to surrender. He located a road block and directed his tanks to destroy it. Fully exposed to fire from enemy positions only 50 yards distant, he stood by his tank directing its fire. Three Germans were killed and 8 surrendered. Again he walked before his tank, leading it against an enemy-held group of houses, machine gun and small arms fire kicking up dust at his feet. The tank fire broke the resistance and 20 enemy surrendered. Going forward again alone he passed an enemy-occupied house from which Germans fired on him and threw grenades in his path. After a brief fire fight, he signaled his tank to come up and fire on the house. Eleven German soldiers were killed and 15 surrendered. Going on alone, he disappeared around a street corner. The fire of his carbine could be heard and in a few minutes he reappeared driving 30 prisoners before him. Under 2d Lt. Zussman's heroic and inspiring leadership, 18 enemy soldiers were killed and 92 captured.

== See also ==
- List of Jewish Medal of Honor recipients
- List of Medal of Honor recipients for World War II
