= William Sawelson =

United States Army Medal of Honor recipient (1895–1918)

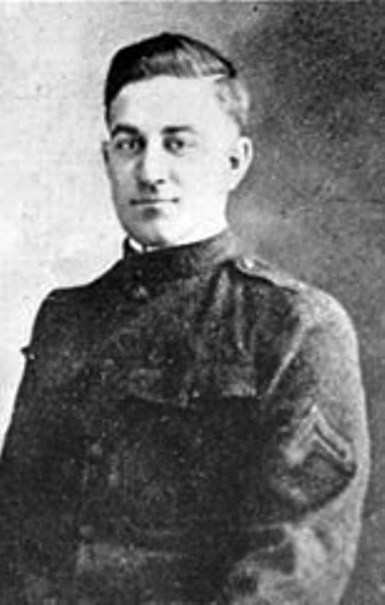
- Medal of Honor recipient
- Born: August 5, 1895; Newark, New Jersey
- Died: October 26, 1918 (aged 23); Grandpré, France
- Burial place: Meuse-Argonne American Cemetery and Memorial Romagne Meuse, France
- Military career
- Allegiance: United States of America
- Branch: United States Army
- Service years: 1917 - 1918
- Rank: Sergeant
- Units: Company M, 312th Infantry, 78th Division
- Conflicts: World War I
- Awards: Medal of Honor

William Sawelson (August 5, 1895 – October 26, 1918) was a sergeant in the U.S. Army during World War I. He received the Medal of Honor for valor in combat. The medal was posthumously presented to his father Jacob L. Sawelson at Governors Island.

He is buried at the Meuse-Argonne American Cemetery and Memorial east of the village of Romagne-sous-Montfaucon.

== Medal of Honor citation ==
- Rank and organization: Sergeant, U.S. Army, Company M, 312th Infantry, 78th Division.
- Place and date: At Grand-Pre, France, October 26, 1918.
- Entered service at: Harrison, N.J.
- Born: August 5, 1895, Newark, N.J.
- General Orders No.16, War Department, January 22, 1919.

Citation:

Hearing a wounded man in a shell hole some distance away calling for water, Sgt. Sawelson, upon his own initiative, left shelter and crawled through heavy machinegun fire to where the man lay, giving him what water he had in his canteen. He then went back to his own shell hole, obtained more water, and was returning to the wounded man when he was killed by a machinegun bullet.

== See also ==
- List of Medal of Honor recipients
- List of Jewish Medal of Honor recipients
- List of Medal of Honor recipients for World War I
