= Benjamin Kaufman =

United States Army Medal of Honor recipient

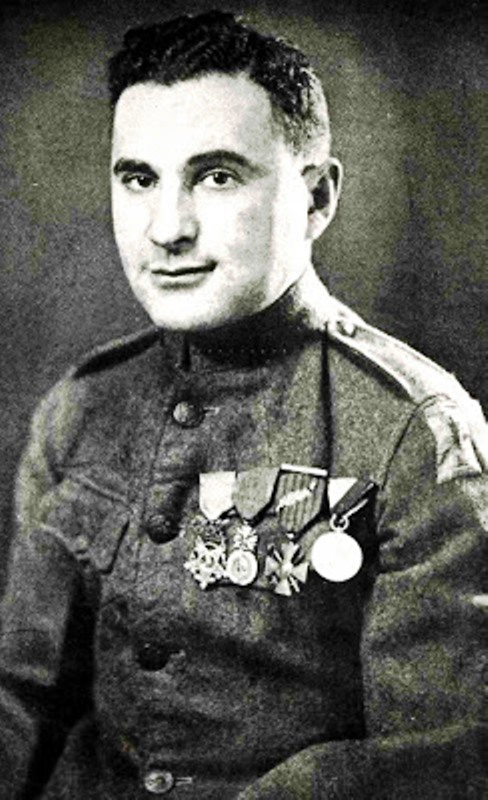
- Born: March 10, 1894; Buffalo, New York
- Died: February 5, 1981 (aged 86); Mercer Medical Center in Trenton, New Jersey
- Military career
- Allegiance: United States of America
- Branch: United States Army
- Service years: 1917 - 1919
- Rank: First Sergeant
- Service number: 1709789
- Units: Company K, 308th Infantry, 77th Division
- Conflicts: World War I: Oisne-Aisne; Meuse-Argonne
- Awards: Medal of Honor; Purple Heart

Benjamin Kaufman (March 10, 1894 – February 5, 1981) was a First Sergeant in the U.S. Army during World War I. He received the Medal of Honor and the Croix de Guerre for bravery in action in the Argonne Forest, France on October 4, 1918.

== Biography ==
Kaufman was born in Buffalo, New York, but grew up in Brooklyn, where he lived at 2113 Pitkin Avenue, at the time of enlistment. His mother was Mrs. Anna Kaufman. He was attending Syracuse University when he had to respond to the call to arms and joined the Army in 1917. He was assigned to Company K, 308th Infantry, 77th Division.

Kaufman proved to be a hero almost as soon as he was in combat in France. He became blinded by a gas shell while aiding in the rescue of several of his men. Despite his refusal of medical help, doctors forced him to go to the hospital. Kaufman decided to go back to battle and borrowed a uniform and made his way back to his outfit. Kaufman was faced with a court martial but the charges were dropped. Kaufman received awards for bravery from nine foreign governments. The United States awarded him the Medal of Honor on April 8, 1919.

During World War II, he was director of the War Manpower Commission in New Jersey. He was also a commander of the New Jersey Council of the Disabled American Veterans of the World War and a national vice commander of the National Legion of Valor.

He was the executive director of the Jewish War Veterans of the United States from 1945 to 1959 and a former national commander of the organization, and for nearly 10 years, he was the manager of the Trenton office of the State Employment Service.

Benjamin Kaufman died on February 5, 1981, at the Mercer Medical Center in Trenton at the age of 86. He was survived by his wife, the former Dorothy Finkle; a daughter, Rita DeVries; a sister, Jennie Edwards, and two grandchildren.

== Medal of Honor Citation ==
- Rank and organization: First Sergeant, United States Army, Company K, 308th Infantry, 77th Division.
- Place and date: In the Forest of Argonne, France, October 4, 1918.
- Entered service at: Brooklyn, New York
- Born: March 10, 1894, Buffalo, New York
- General Orders: War Department, General Orders No. 50 (April 12, 1919)

Citation:

He took out a patrol for the purpose of attacking an enemy machinegun which had checked the advance of his company. Before reaching the gun he became separated from his patrol and a machinegun bullet shattered his right arm. Without hesitation he advanced on the gun alone, throwing grenades with his left hand and charging with an empty pistol, taking one prisoner and scattering the crew, bringing the gun and prisoner back to the first-aid station.

== Military Awards ==
Kaufman's military decorations and awards include:

1st row	Medal of Honor		
2nd row	Purple Heart	World War I Victory Medal w/three bronze service stars to denote credit for the Oise-Aisne, Meuse-Argonne and Defensive Sector battle clasps.	Médaille militaire (French Republic)
3rd row	Croix de guerre 1914–1918 w/bronze palm (French Republic)	Croce al Merito di Guerra (Italy)	Medal for Military Bravery (Kingdom of Montenegro)

== See also ==
- List of Medal of Honor recipients
- List of Jewish Medal of Honor recipients
- List of Medal of Honor recipients for World War I
