= Charles Gardiner (disambiguation) =

Charles Gardiner (1720–1769) was an Irish landowner and politician.

Charles or Charlie Gardiner may also refer to:

- Charlie Gardiner (Australian footballer) (born 1983), Australian rules footballer
- Charlie Gardiner (footballer, born 1915) (1915–1973), Scottish footballer
- Charlie Gardiner (ice hockey) (1904–1934), ice hockey goalie with Chicago
- Charles Gardiner, 1st Earl of Blessington (1782–1829), Irish earl

== See also ==
- Charles Gardner (disambiguation)
- Charles Gairdner (1898–1983), British Army general
- Gardiner (surname)
