= Benjamin Levy =

Medal of Honor recipient

Benjamin Bennett Levy
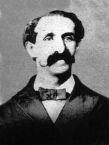
- Black and white portrait photograph of Benjamin Levy
- Born: 1845; New York City
- Died: 1921 (aged 75–76); Brooklyn, New York
- Burial place: Cypress Hill Cemetery, Brooklyn
- Military career
- Allegiance: United States; Union
- Branch: United States Army; Union Army
- Service years: 1861–1863, 1864–1865
- Rank: Sergeant
- Units: (New York (state)) Company B, 1st New York Infantry
- Conflicts: American Civil War
- Awards: Medal of Honor

Benjamin Bennett Levy (22 February 1845 – 20 July 1921) was a Private in the Union Army and a Medal of Honor recipient for his actions in the American Civil War. His younger brother, Robert Levy, also served as a drummer, with the 7th New York Volunteer Infantry Regiment.

== Biography ==
Levy as born in New York City and enlisted in the Union Army from Newport News, Virginia in October 1861.

After Benjamin's drum was destroyed during the Battle of Glendale (Frayser's Farm) on 30 June 1862, he took the weapon of his ill tent mate, Jacob Turnbull, and joined the fight. Shortly thereafter, he saw the color bearer, Charley Mahorn, fall from a bullet wound to the chest; Levy picked up Mahorn's flag and joined the charge.

Levy enlisted with the 1st New York Infantry Regiment from Newport News, Virginia in October 1861, and mustered out in May 1863. He re-enlisted with the 40th New York Infantry Regiment in January 1864 and was discharged due to disability in May 1865.

Benjamin Levy was the first Jewish American to be cited for and later receive the Congressional Medal of Honor.

He died 20 July 1921 in Brooklyn, New York and is buried there in Cypress Hill Cemetery.

== Medal of Honor citation ==
Rank and organization: Private, Company B, 1st New York Infantry. Place and date: At Glendale, Va., June 30, 1862. Entered service at: New York, 22 April 1861. Birth: 22 Feb. 1845 New York, N.Y. Date of issue: March 1, 1865. Citation:

This soldier, a drummer boy, took the gun of a sick comrade, went into the fight, and when the color bearers were shot down, carried the colors and saved them from capture.

== See also ==
- List of Jewish Medal of Honor recipients
- List of American Civil War Medal of Honor recipients: G–L
- Benjamin Levy (merchant)
