= Jewish War Veterans of the United States of America =

American veterans' organization

- Abbreviation: JWV
- Formation: 1896
- Headquarters: 1811 R Street NW; Washington, D.C. 20009
- Members: About 7,000
- National Commander: Barry Lischinsky, COL, US Army, retired
- National Vice Commander: Gary Ginsburg, CSM, US Army, retired
- Website: jwv.org

Jewish War Veterans of the United States of America (also referred to as Jewish War Veterans of the U.S.A., Jewish War Veterans, or JWV) is an American Jewish veterans' organization founded in 1896 by American Civil War veterans to raise awareness of contributions made by Jewish service members.

Jewish War Veterans has an estimated 7,000 members, ranging from World War II to current conflicts as well as active duty personnel. It is the oldest active national veterans' service organization in the US.

== History ==
Jewish War Veterans of the United States of America was established in 1896 by a group of 63 Jewish Civil War veterans after a series of antisemitic comments about the lack of Jewish service in the American Civil War. JWV is one of the Veteran Services Organizations that holds a Congressional charter under Title 36 of the United States Code.

JWV, as part of the Jewish Council for Public Affairs (JCPA), opposed the Rosenberg Committee, believing them to be a Communist group. The council issued a statement that the Rosenberg Committee's accusation that the Rosenberg trial was motivated by antisemitism was causing public panic within the Jewish community.

An exhibit documenting their activities from 1930 to 2003, is on display at the Center for Jewish History by the American Jewish Historical Society. It includes the anti-Nazi boycotts years before the start of World War II and the efforts to establish the National Shrine for the Jewish War Dead.

== Organization ==
National Museum of American Jewish Military History
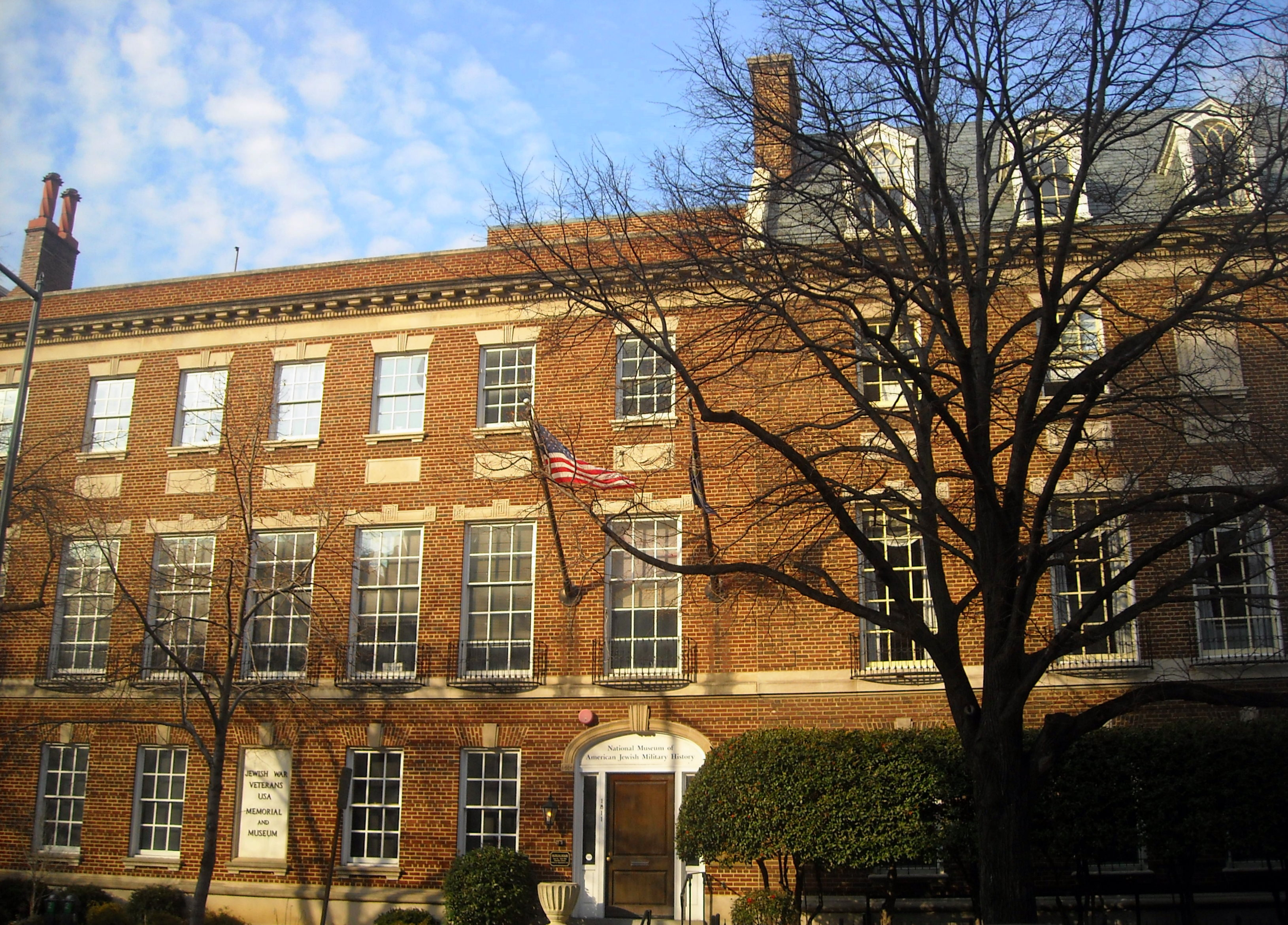
- Established: September 2, 1958
- Location: 1811 R Street NW; Washington DC 20009-1603
- Presidents: Elaine Bernstein, PNP of JWVA
- Public transit access: Dupont Circle, Q Street Exit, Washington Metro Red Line
- Website: http://www.nmajmh.org

The National Convention is the annual assembly of JWV, in which "supreme power" is vested. The 128th Annual National Convention in 2023, for example, was held August 27-31 in Jacksonville, Florida. Participation at National Conventions is restricted to voting members of the National Executive Committee who shall vote at the same time with their posts and delegates.

The last several years of JWV's annual National Convention:

- 2018 Convention in Tampa, Florida.
- 2019 Convention in Richmond, Virginia.
- 2020 Convention was held virtually due to the COVID-19 pandemic.
- 2021 Convention was held in Orlando, Florida.
- 2022 Convention was held in Savannah, Georgia.
- 2023 Convention was held in Jacksonville, Florida.
- 2024 Convention was held in Atlantic City, New Jersey.
- 2025 Convention was held in Henderson, Nevada.
- 2026 Convention is slated to be held in Albany, New York.

Subsidiary organizations include the Ladies Auxiliary (Jewish War Veterans Auxiliary, or JWVA), posts or other echelons created outside the United States, and any other subsidiary organizations established by a two-thirds vote of the National Executive Committee.

=== Leadership ===
Jewish War Veterans leadership is organized into, in descending order of rank, a National Commander, a National Vice Commander, the National Executive Committee, departments, district or county councils, and posts. At the 128th annual National Convention, held in Jacksonville, Florida (in August 2023), retired US Army Colonel Barry Lischinsky of Massachusetts was elected as the 92nd National Commander, and retired US Army Command Sergeant Major Gary Ginsburg of New York was elected as the 4th National Vice Commander.

=== Staff ===
Jewish War Veterans is headquartered in Washington, District of Columbia inside the National Museum of American Jewish Military History. Paid staff comprises a National Executive Director, a Director of Operations, a Membership Director, a Communications Director, a National Service Officer, an Accounting Associate, a Building Manager, a Programs & Events Coordinator, and a Public Relations & Graphic Design Coordinator.

== Membership ==
Membership eligibility is established in JWV's National Constitution, which lists the categories of membership as active, associate, patron, honorary, in-service, posthumous, life, and distinguished life Types of Membership - Jewish War Veterans of the U.S.A., and provides that "No person who promotes, or is a member of any organization or group which believes in, or advocates, bigotry or the overthrow of the United States government by force of arms or subversion" shall be eligible for membership.

== Programs ==
=== JROTC Americanism Award ===
JROTC programs can be found at high schools throughout the United States and in Department of Defense Education Activity high schools around the world. JWV's JROTC Americanism Award is bestowed upon any JROTC participant, of any rank, once it has been determined that s/he meets the requirements for the award.

=== Scouting ===
The JWV also has programs supporting the Boy Scouts and Girl Scouts.

Each year the JWV holds a memorial service at Arlington National Cemetery commemorating Orde Wingate, a major general in the British Army and a Zionist. JWV also holds Memorial Day and Veterans Day ceremonies, as well as Vietnam Veterans Memorial and Korean War Veterans Memorial programs, as well as programs for Vietnam veterans.

Jewish War Veterans also actively supports women in the military.

=== Jewish ===
The JWV manages the National Museum of American Jewish Military History (NMAJMH) in Washington, D.C., close to its headquarters. Annually, JWV and NMAJMH join Sixth & I Historic Synagogue to remember our Fallen Heroes in Iraq and Afghanistan on the Friday before Memorial Day.

The organization sponsors, in cooperation with the Department of Defense, a Days of Remembrance of the Victims of the Holocaust observance on military installations during the week coinciding with Yom HaShoah.

The JWV administers a JWV National Reward Fund, which offers rewards for information leading to the arrest and conviction of those who have perpetrated antisemitic and other hate crimes and presents about 30 engraved kiddush cups for graduates of Federal Military Colleges.

=== Service ===
National Service Officers (NSO) Program is a nationwide network of members who are certified to help veterans navigate the claims process.

JWV gives different awards to its members for excellence and service, including awards to different departments, councils, or posts, as well as any echelon or to individuals.

The group runs a "Support Our Soldiers" (SOS), which sends care packages of toiletries and kosher food, and Jewish holiday items to Jewish soldiers serving overseas in Iraq, Afghanistan, or elsewhere.

The JWV also runs a disaster relief fundraising and volunteer program and a National Stamp Distribution Program for "hospitalized veterans."

JWV members also volunteer at VA hospitals and as National Service Officers, which help veterans, regardless of religion, get the benefits they deserve and navigate the complex Department of Veterans Affairs policies.

To connect with younger generations, JWV also runs a Boy Scout and Girl Scout Program, a JROTC program, and the JWV Foundation runs the National Youth Achievement Program which gives grants to high school seniors entering college who are descendants of JWV members. The Foundation also hosts the National Achievement Award Program, which is an essay contest for active duty personnel and veterans looking to continue their education.

=== Affinity ===
The JWV offers group insurance plans for its members, as well as discount and promotion plans in cooperation with businesses including USAA.

== Advocacy ==
Annually, Jewish War Veterans releases a set of Resolutions reflecting JWV's legislative & advocacy priorities for the coming year.

During its annual "midwinter" meeting of the National Executive Committee (NEC), JWV members have the opportunity to participate in a "Capitol Hill Action Day" with other members within the same department. They meet with Members of Congress or their staffs to discuss issues of importance to their specific community, state, or region; these issues are generally related to veterans' issues or antisemitism.

In the spring of most calendar years, JWV is among those Veteran Service Organizations whose National Commander provides testimony to the House Veterans' Affairs Committee. Past National Commander Nelson Mellitz of New Jersey testified during the first session of the 118th Congress on March 8, 2023.

=== Veterans Issues ===
==== Affiliations ====
Jewish War Veterans is a member of numerous coalitions made up of other nonprofit Military Support Organizations (MSOs) and Veteran Service/Support Organizations (VSOs) to advocate for active duty military personnel, veterans, military/veteran spouses, caregivers, and survivors.

- The Military Coalition (TMC)
- National Military & Veterans Alliance (NMVA)
- TEAM Coalition
- White Oak Collaborative
- Veterans Day National Committee (VDNC)

=== Support for Israel ===
In September 2026 Hirsi Ali signed a letter, together with over 5000 other public figures and organizations, rejecting the claim that Israel committed genocide in Gaza. The letter stated, among other things: "“In this war, only one side intended to commit genocide, and that is Hamas."

== See also ==
- List of Jewish Americans in the military
- Military history of Jewish Americans
