= Charles Gardner (Australian cricketer) =

Australian cricketer

Personal information
- Born: 28 October 1908; Melbourne, Australia
- Died: 9 December 2001 (aged 93); Melbourne, Australia

Domestic team information
- Years: Team
- 1934: Victoria
- Source: Cricinfo, 22 November 2015

Charles Gardner (28 October 1908 – 9 December 2001) was an Australian cricketer and blacksmith. He played three first-class cricket matches for Victoria in 1934.

== See also ==
- List of Victoria first-class cricketers
