= Dick Gardner =

English footballer

Personal information
- Full name: Charles Richard Gardner
- Date of birth: 22 December 1913
- Place of birth: Birmingham, England
- Date of death: 1997 (aged 83–84)
- Height: 5 ft 9 1/2 in (1.77 m)
- Position: Inside right

Senior career*
| Years | Team | Apps | (Gls) |
- Evesham Town
| 1933–1934 | Notts County | 0 | (0) |
- Stourbridge
| 1935–1937 | Manchester United | 16 | (1) |
| 1937–1938 | Sheffield United | 11 | (1) |
- Stourbridge
- * Club domestic league appearances and goals

Charles Richard Gardner (22 December 1913 - 1997) was an English footballer. His regular position was as an inside right. Born in Birmingham, Gardner played for Evesham Town, Notts County, Stourbridge, Sheffield United, and Manchester United.
