= Sydney G. Gumpertz =

Jewish American Medal of Honor recipient (1879–1971)

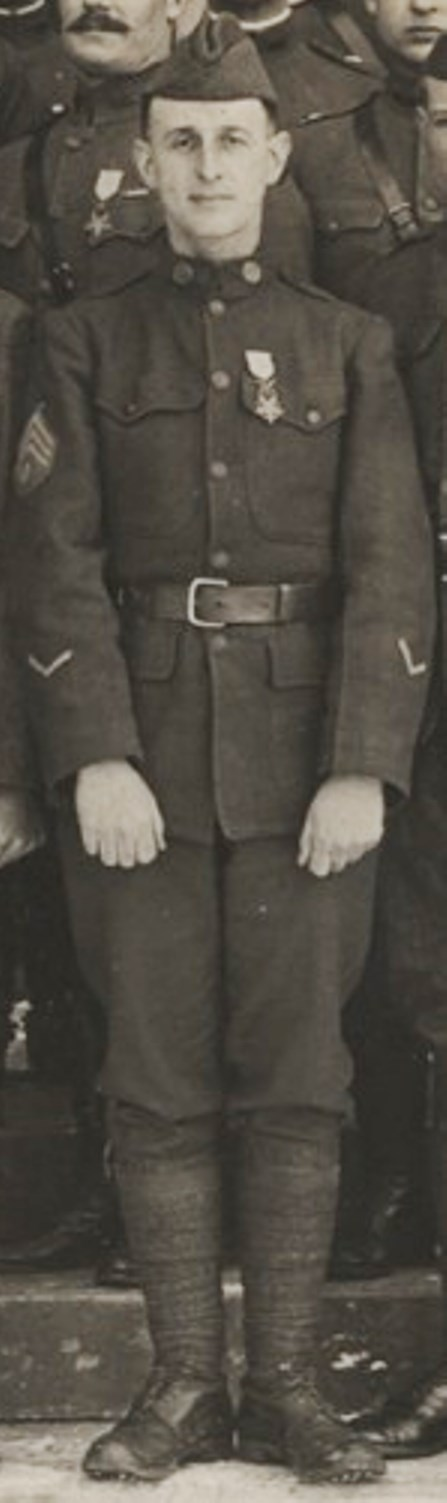
- Medal of Honor recipient
- Born: October 24, 1879; San Rafael, California
- Died: February 16, 1971 (aged 91); New York, New York
- Burial place: Long Island National Cemetery
- Military career
- Allegiance: United States of America
- Branch: United States Army
- Rank: First Sergeant
- Service number: 0-1388848
- Units: Company E, 132d Infantry, 33d Division
- Awards: Medal of Honor

Sydney Gustave Gumpertz (October 24, 1879 – February 16, 1971) was a United States Army First Sergeant and recipient to the highest military decoration for valor in combat — the Medal of Honor — during World War I.

== Biography ==
Gumpertz was born in San Rafael, California on October 24, 1879. After attending public school, he went to work as a journalist.

In 1917, he enlisted in the U.S. Army at Chicago. Assigned to the 33d Division, he served in France during the battles on the Somme, at St. Mihiel and in the Argonne.

Returning to the United States, Gumpertz found work in the advertising industry in New York City. To help combat American antisemitism, he wrote a book entitled The Jewish Legion of Valor in 1934 celebrating the accomplishments of Jewish American soldiers from the American Revolutionary War onward.

Gumpertz died at the Veterans Administration Hospital in New York City on February 16, 1971. He was interred at Long Island National Cemetery on February 23, 1971.

== Awards ==
- Medal of Honor
- World War I Victory Medal
- Médaille militaire (France)
- Croix de Guerre with palm (France)

=== Medal of Honor Citation ===
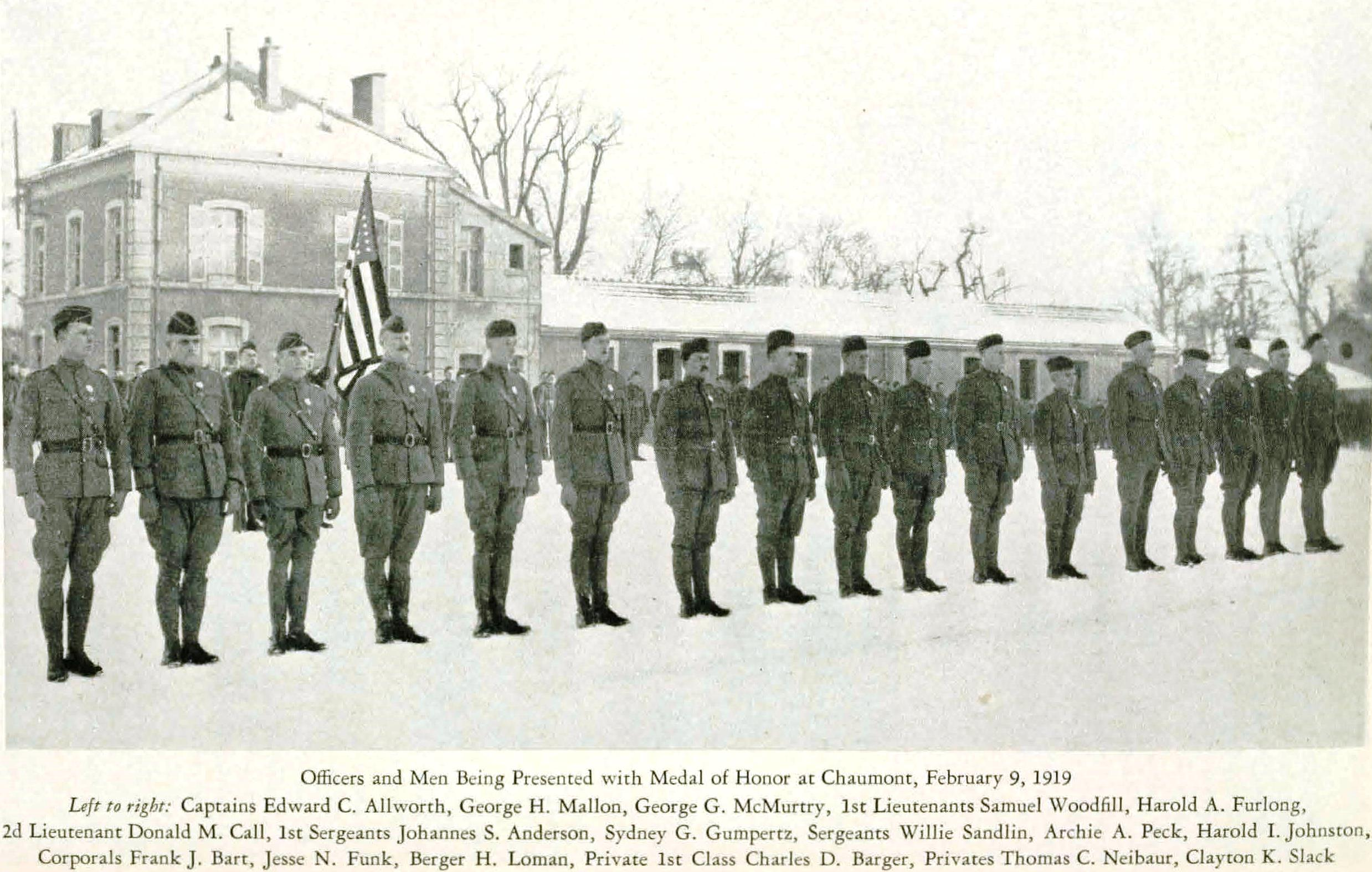
Medal of Honor Presentation Ceremony - February 9, 1919, at Chaumont, France. General John J. Pershing presided.

- Rank and organization: First Sergeant, United States Army, Company E, 132d Infantry, 33d Division.
- Place and date: In the Bois-de-Forges, France, September 29, 1918.
- Entered service at: Chicago, Illinois.
- Born: October 24, 1879, San Raphael, California.
- General Orders No.: 16, War Department, 1919.
- Residence at enlistment: 57 East Van Buren Street, Chicago, Illinois.

Citation:

When the advancing line was held up by machinegun fire, 1st Sgt. Gumpertz left the platoon of which he was in command and started with 2 other soldiers through a heavy barrage toward the machinegun nest. His 2 companions soon became casualties from bursting shells, but 1st Sgt. Gumpertz continued on alone in the face of direct fire from the machinegun, jumped into the nest and silenced the gun, capturing 9 of the crew.

== See also ==
- List of Medal of Honor recipients
- List of Jewish Medal of Honor recipients
- List of Medal of Honor recipients for World War I
