= Simon Suhler =

- Born: 1844; Bavaria, Germany
- Died: 1895 (aged 50–51); San Antonio, Texas, US
- Burial place: San Antonio National Cemetery, San Antonio, Texas
- Military career
- Allegiance: United States of America; Union
- Branch: United States Army; Union Army
- Service years: 1863 - 1865, 1866 - 1878
- Rank: Sergeant
- Nickname: Charles Gardner
- Unit: 8th Cavalry Regiment
- Conflicts: American Civil War; American Indian Wars
- Awards: Medal of Honor

Simon Suhler (1844–1895) was a private in the United States Army and a recipient of America's highest military decoration—the Medal of Honor—for his actions in the Indian Wars of the western United States.

== Biography ==
Suhler enlisted in the 32nd Indiana Regiment (known unofficially as the First Indiana German Regiment) at the outset of the Civil War. The 32nd spoke German and were headed by former Prussian officer August Willich. After his capture and wounding at Shiloh and being furloughed back, he deserted from this unit and served under the name of Simon Neustadle, honorably, the remainder of the Civil War in the 11th Heavy Artillery. He also later served in the 4th New York Heavy Artillery.

After the war he joined the 8th Cavalry Regiment under the assumed name Charles Gardner, where he earned the Medal of Honor fighting the Apaches in Arizona. He was awarded the Medal of Honor at the rank of private. After 12 years in the 8th Cavalry he retired at the rank of sergeant. He was recommended to be promoted to lieutenant but this never took place.

Suhler died in 1895 and was buried at San Antonio National Cemetery, San Antonio, Texas. A corrected monument was placed at his gravesite on Veterans Day in 1988. His grave site can be found in Section I Grave 1610 and the GPS location is (lat/lon): 29.2528, -98.28068.

== Medal of Honor citation ==
- Rank and organization: Private, Company B, 8th U.S. Cavalry.
- Place and date: Arizona, August to October 1868.
- Entered service at:------.
- Birth: Bavaria.
- Date of issue: July 24, 1869.

Citation:

Bravery in scouts and actions against Indians.

== See also ==
- List of Medal of Honor recipients
- List of Jewish Medal of Honor recipients
- List of Medal of Honor recipients for the Indian Wars
- Monument to the 32nd Indiana Regiment
