= Solomon Bush =

American Revolutionary War officer (1753–1795)

- Born: 1753; Philadelphia, Province of Pennsylvania
- Died: 1795 (aged 41–42); Philadelphia, Pennsylvania, U.S.
- Resting place: Friends Burial Ground, Philadelphia
- Relatives: Mathias Bush (father); Lewis Bush (brother)
- Military career
- Allegiance: United States
- Branch: Pennsylvania Militia
- Service years: 1776–1785
- Rank: Lieutenant colonel
- Conflicts: Battle of Long Island; Philadelphia campaign
- Other work: Medical practice in London; correspondent of George Washington

Solomon Bush (1753–1795) was an American Jewish officer in the Pennsylvania militia during the American Revolutionary War. Born in Philadelphia, the son of the merchant Mathias Bush, he was badly wounded and taken prisoner in 1777 and was later promoted to lieutenant colonel, becoming one of two Jewish officers to hold that rank in the Revolution. His brothers Lewis Bush, a Continental Army major killed at the Battle of Brandywine, and Jonas Bush also served in the war.

== Revolutionary War service ==
=== Early service ===
Bush joined the Philadelphia militia as a captain early in 1776, in the Flying Camp of the Pennsylvania Associators. He served at the Battle of Long Island in August 1776 and was promoted to major. Explaining why he had joined the army, he wrote that he sought "to revenge the rongs of my injured country." On July 5, 1777, the Supreme Executive Council of Pennsylvania appointed him deputy adjutant-general of the state militia.

=== Wounded and captured ===
When General William Howe invaded Pennsylvania in September 1777, the militia was called out to defend Philadelphia. A week after the Battle of Brandywine, at which his brother Lewis was mortally wounded, Bush was badly wounded in a skirmish on September 18, 1777, when a musket ball broke his thigh bone. He was taken to Philadelphia to recover; in a letter written that November, he said his doctor had given him seven days to live.

During the British occupation of Philadelphia, Bush was taken prisoner in December 1777 and released on parole. While a prisoner, he learned of a spy in Washington's headquarters, and the information reached Washington by December 19, 1777.

=== Promotion ===
Because his wound kept him at his father's home in Chestnut Hill and he could not earn a living, the Supreme Executive Council passed a series of resolutions concerning him on October 20, 1779, and on October 27 promoted him to lieutenant colonel, with pay according to that rank.

== Later life ==
Bush remained in financial difficulty after the war. On November 5, 1785, the council of Pennsylvania, then under the presidency of Benjamin Franklin, ordered that he be paid a pension for his services. He applied without success for several government posts, including health officer of Pennsylvania in 1784 and, in 1791, the naval office of the port of Philadelphia.

Bush later moved to London, where he opened a medical practice. In 1789 he began writing occasional letters to George Washington. On July 20 of that year he reported to Washington the seizure of an American ship from New York, which the British had taken on the grounds that several of its seamen were natives of Britain. Though not a diplomat, he undertook to represent the American position and offered to serve as an envoy to Britain, an offer Washington did not take up.

== Religious and civic life ==
In 1782 Bush contributed toward the new synagogue building of Congregation Mikveh Israel in Philadelphia. He was a prominent Freemason, and he also joined the Quaker-founded Pennsylvania Abolition Society. At his own request, he was buried in the Friends Burial Ground in Philadelphia.
