= Haitian Campaign Medal =

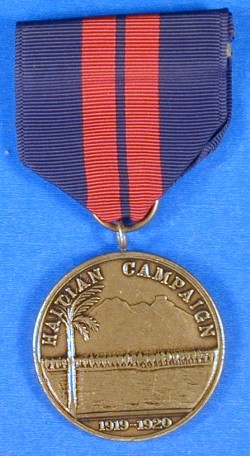
- Obverse
- Type: Medal
- Presented by: Department of the Navy
- Eligibility: participation in the United States occupation of Haiti in 1915, 1919, and 1920
- Status: Obsolete
- Established: by Department of the Navy: General Orders No. 305: June 22, 1915 and Department of the Navy: General Orders No. 77: December 6, 1921
- First award: 1917 ("1915" medal)
- Final award: Unknown
- Service ribbon and streamer

The Haitian Campaign Medal was a United States Navy military award which was first established on June 22, 1917, and again on December 6, 1921 for American soldiers participating in the United States occupation of Haiti.

The medal was first intended for members of both the Navy and U.S. Marine Corps who had served ashore in Haiti from and or was aboard the cruiser and flagship USS Washington (ACR-11) or any of the other thirteen named ships of the United States fleet under the command of Rear Admiral William B. Caperton on July 9 through December 6, 1915, for the purpose of protecting life and property during a revolution in Haiti.

Another version of the medal was made in 1921 which was intended again for Navy and Marine Corps members who engaged in operations, either ashore or afloat in Haiti on April 1, 1919 through June 15, 1920.

The two Haitian Campaign Medals are basically the same awards, with the only difference being the dates inscribed at the bottom of the front or obverse side of each medal, either 1915 or 1919–1920. For those eligible in both time periods a campaign clasp is worn on the 1915 version of the medal with a 3/16 inch bronze star worn on the service ribbon. The medal was designed by Rudolf Freund (1878–1960) of Bailey, Banks & Biddle. Both the first and second versions of the Haitian Campaign Medal may not be worn simultaneously.

The medal(s) are no longer an active award of the United States Navy and is considered obsolete. Modern day military operations in Haiti, such as the 1994 peacekeeping operations, are typically recognized by international military awards such as the NATO Medal.

== Notable Recipients ("1915" version) ==
Medal of Honor recipients

- Smedley Butler, USMC major, for actions on 17 November 1915
- Daniel Daly, USMC gunnery sergeant, for actions on 22 October 1915
- Samuel Gross, USMC private, for actions on 17 November 1915
- Ross Iams, USMC sergeant., for actions on 17 November 1915
- Ross Ostermann, USMC 1st Lt., for actions on 24 October 1915
- William P. Upshur, USMC captain, for actions on 24 October 1915

Other notable recipients

- William Caperton, USN admiral, first recipient
- Louis E. Denfeld, USN admiral
- John T. Selden, USMC lieutenant general
- Pedro del Valle, USMC lieutenant general

== Notable recipients ("1919–1920" version) ==
Medal of Honor recipients

- William Button, USMC corporal, for actions on 31 October – 1 November 1919
- Herman Hanneken, USMC 2nd Lt., for actions on 31 October – 1 November 1919

Other notable recipients

- Hayne D. Boyden, Brigadier general, USMC
- Robert H. Pepper, Lieutenant general, USMC
- John T. Selden, Lieutenant general, USMC
