= List of cemeteries in Pennsylvania =

This list of cemeteries in Pennsylvania includes currently operating, historical (closed for new interments), and defunct (graves abandoned or removed) cemeteries, columbaria, and mausolea which are historical and/or notable. It does not include pet cemeteries.

== Cemeteries in Pennsylvania ==
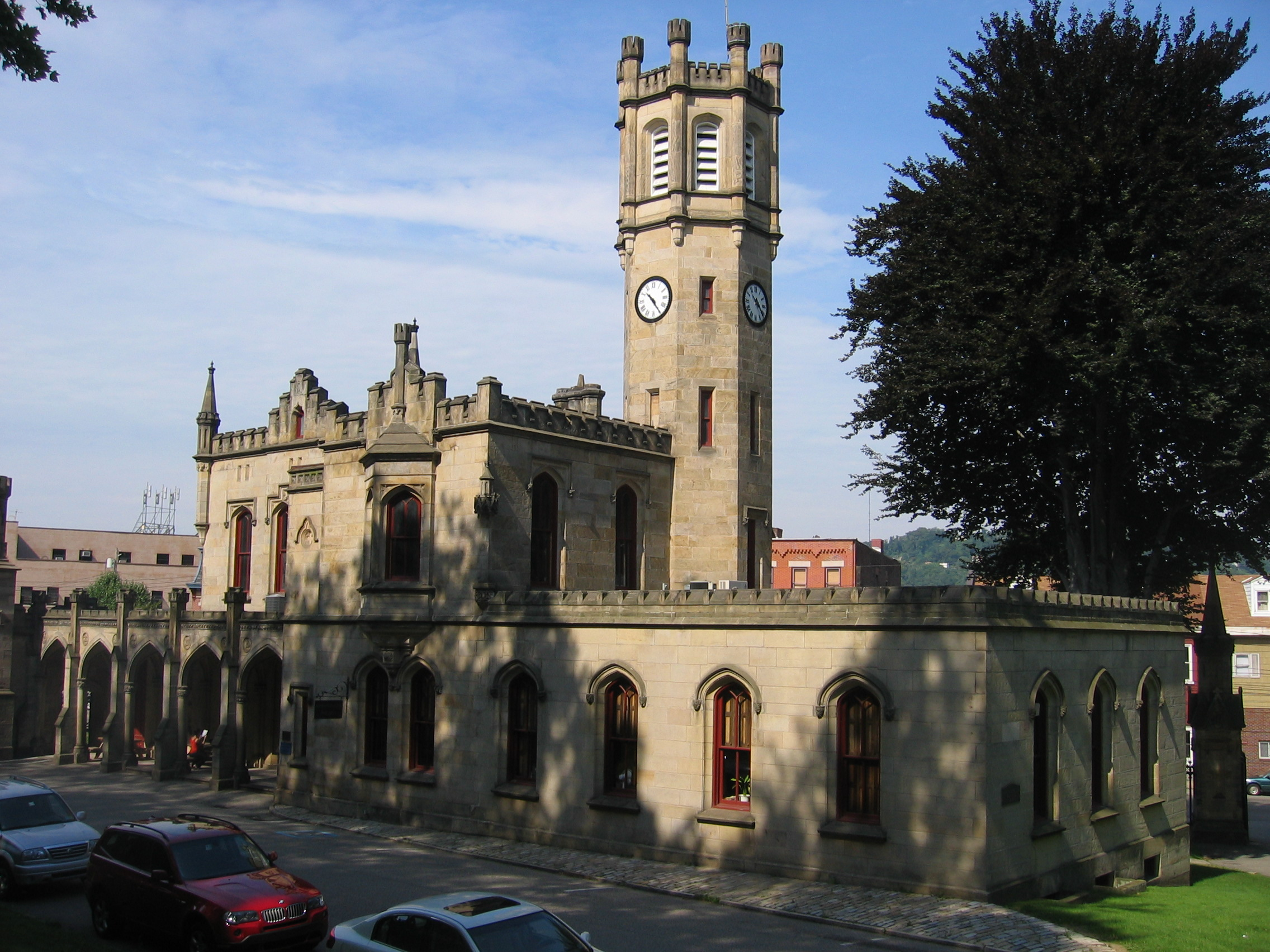
Butler St. Entrance of Allegheny Cemetery

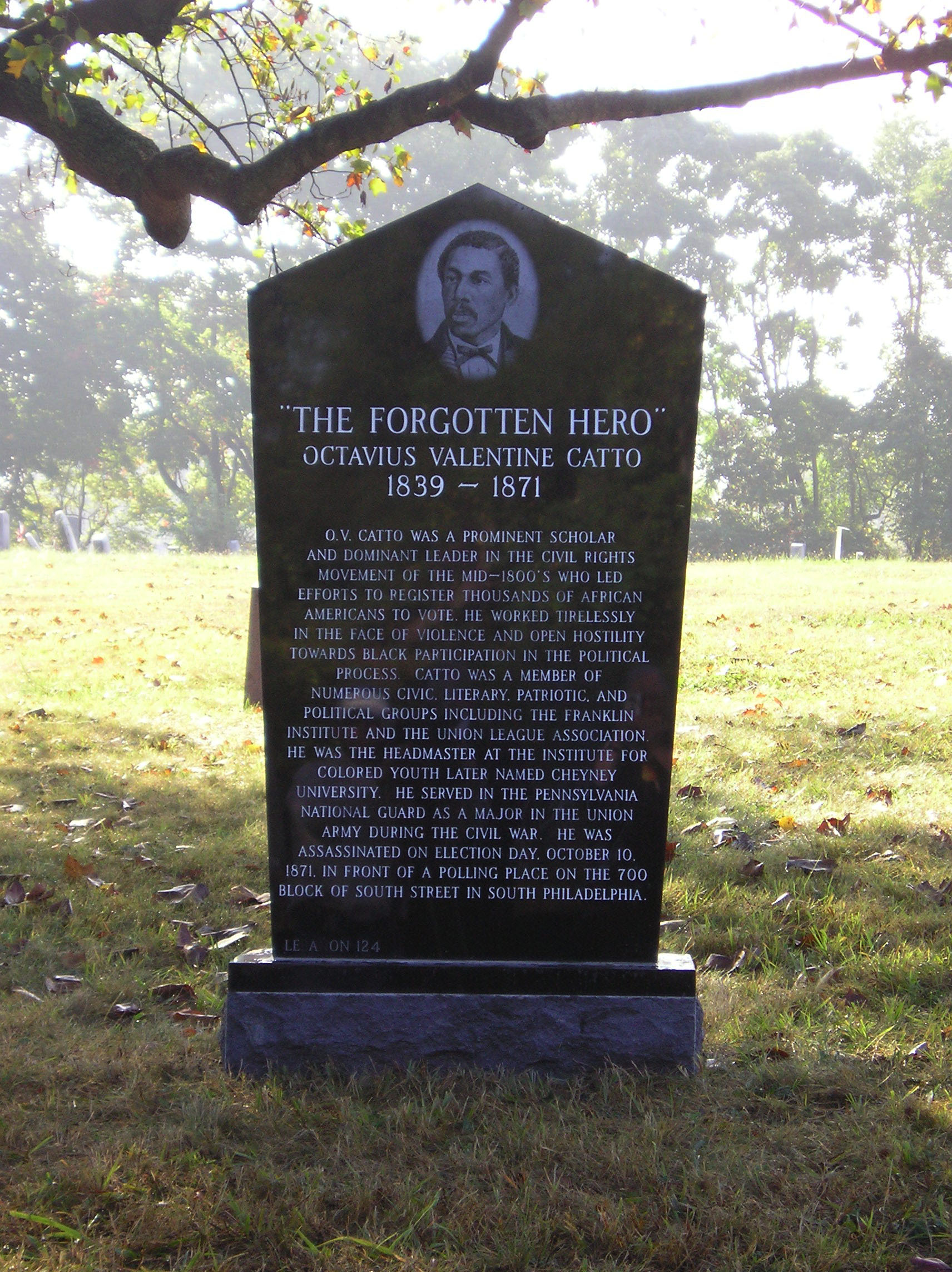
Octavius Catto grave at Eden Cemetery

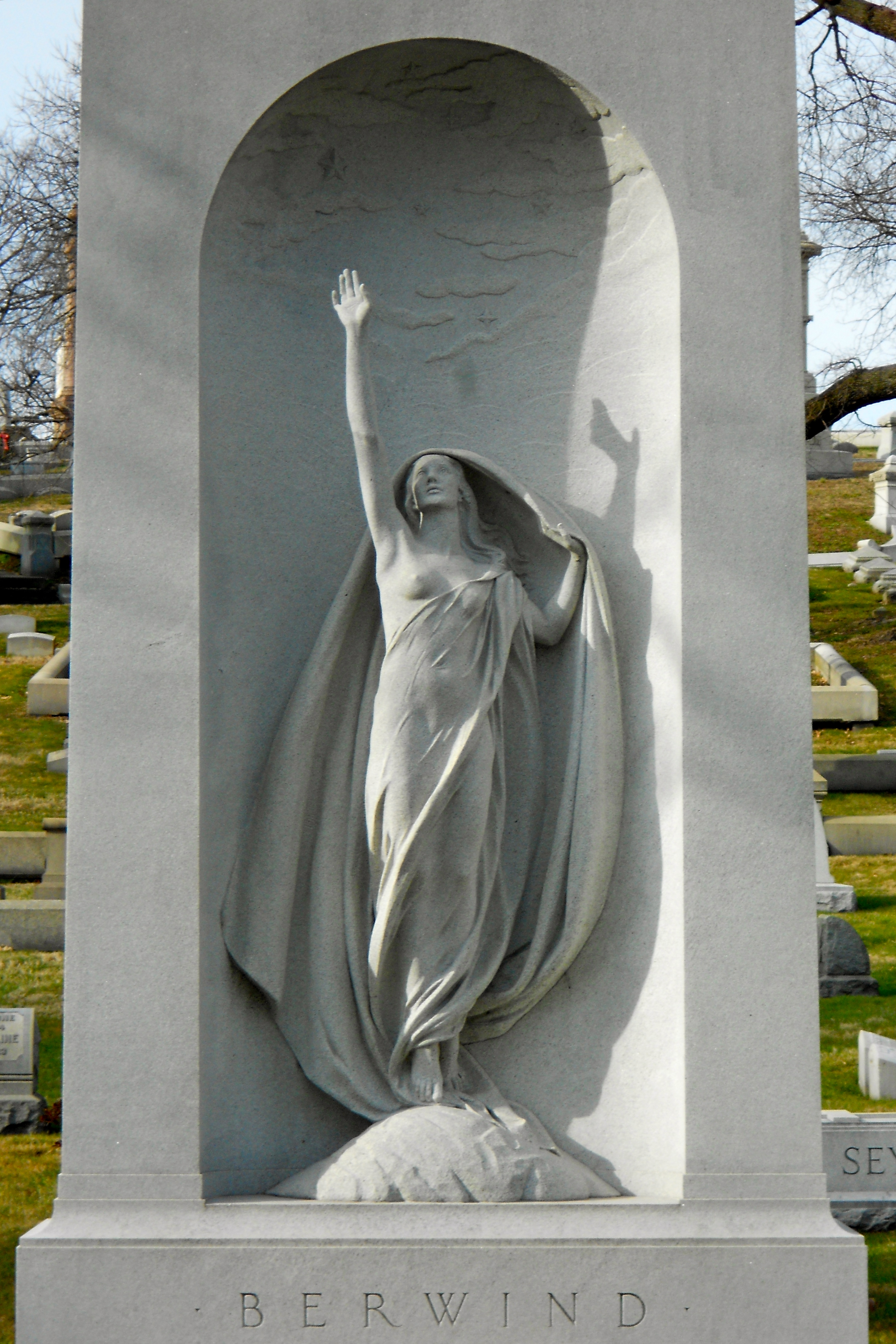
The sculpture Aspiration by Harriet Whitney Frishmuth and the Berwind tomb at Laurel Hill Cemetery

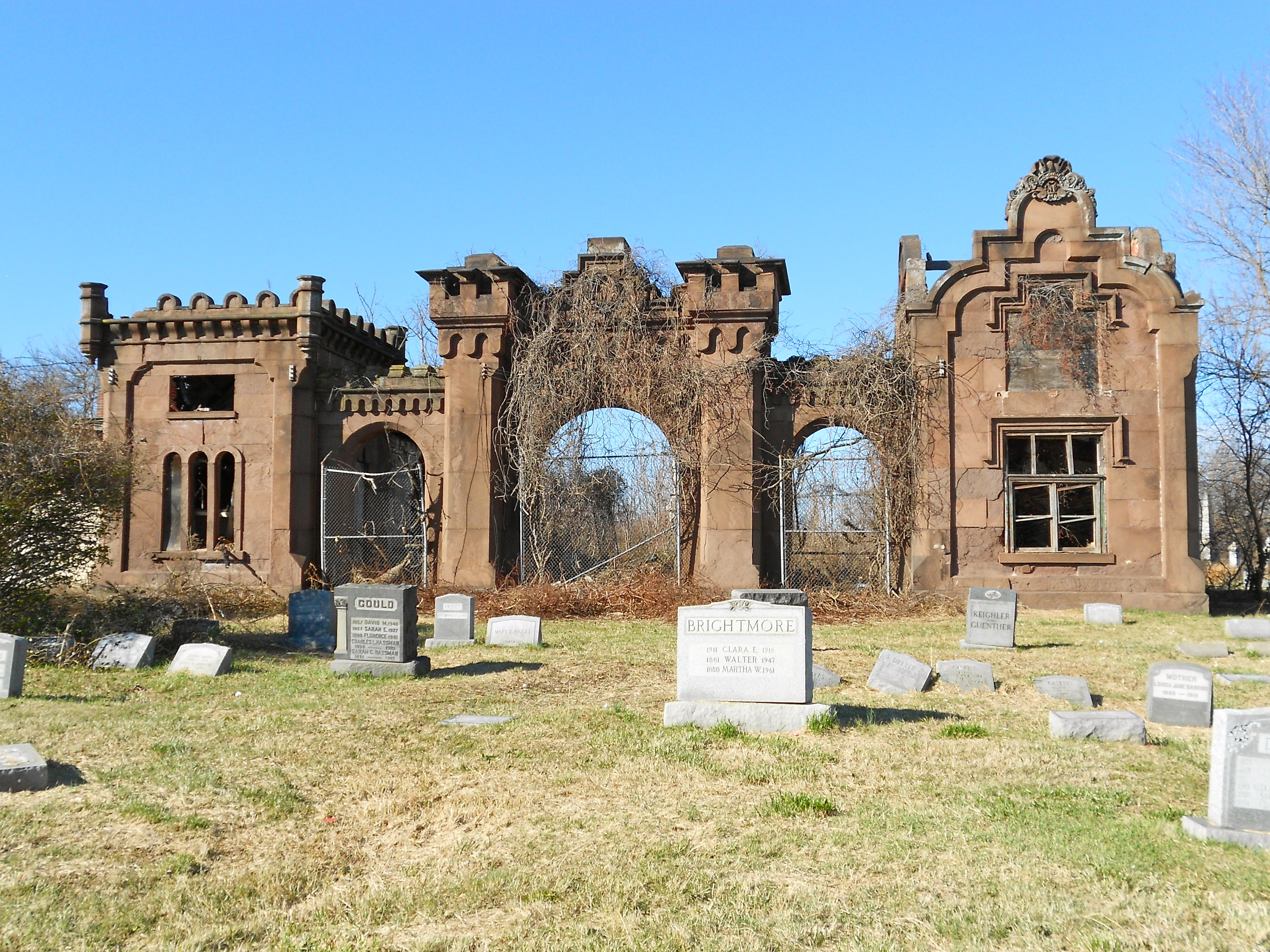
Mount Moriah Gatehouse

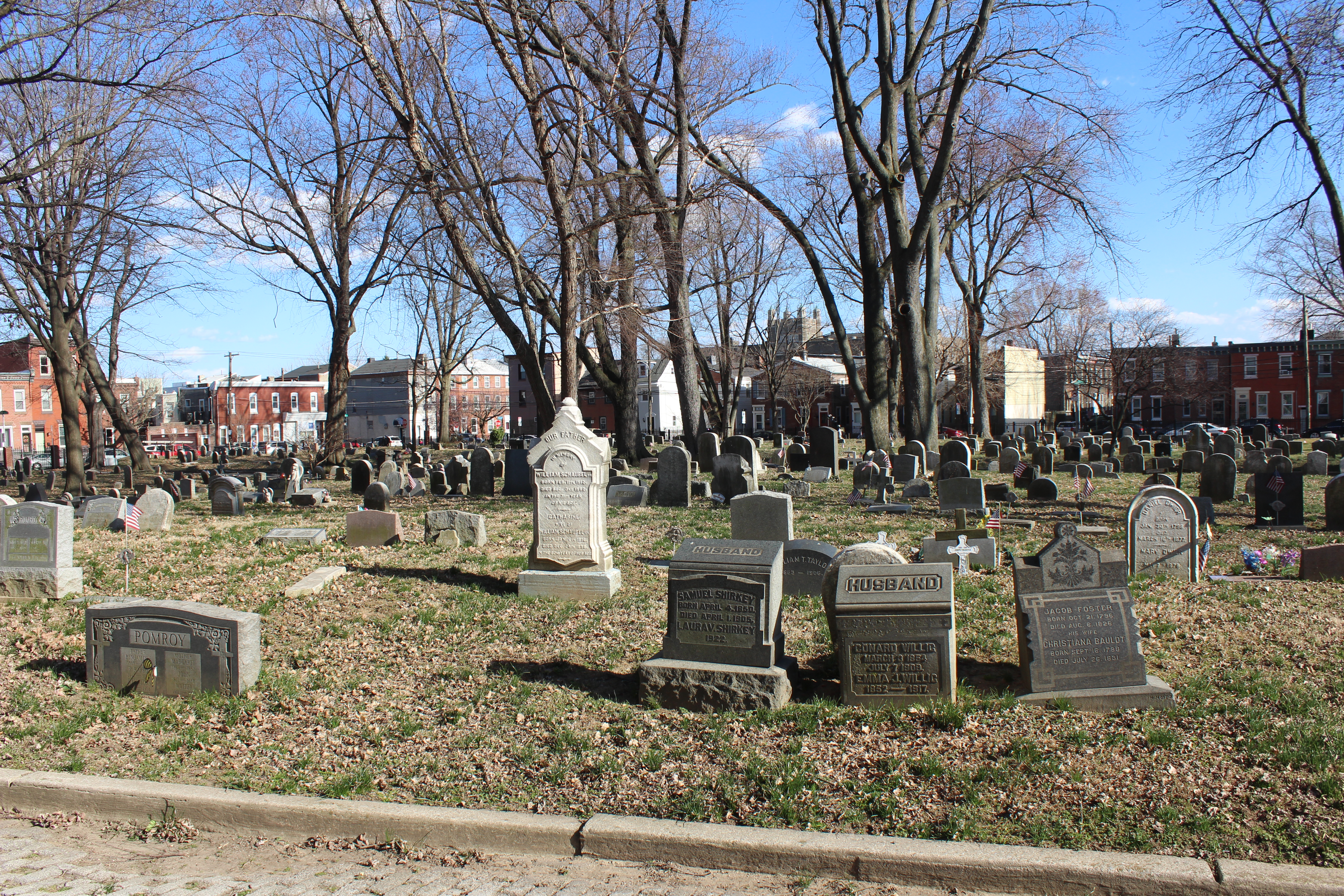
Palmer Cemetery in the Fishtown neighborhood of Philadelphia

- Allegheny Cemetery, Pittsburgh (Lawrenceville neighborhood)
- Arlington Cemetery (Pennsylvania), Drexel Hill, Pennsylvania
- Beechwoods Cemetery, Washington Township, Jefferson County
- Bergstrasse Cemetery
- Beth El Cemetery, Harrisburg
- Calvary Catholic Cemetery (Pittsburgh), Pittsburgh
- Cedar Hill Cemetery, Philadelphia
- Cedar Lawn Cemetery, Lancaster
- Charles Baber Cemetery, Pottsville, Schuylkill County
- Charles Evans Cemetery, Reading, Berks County
- Chester Rural Cemetery, Chester, Delaware County
- Chestnut Ridge and Schellsburg Union Church and Cemetery, Bedford County
- Chevra Bikur Cholim Cemetery, Philadelphia
- Christ Church Burial Ground, Philadelphia
- Christ Hamilton United Lutheran Church and Cemetery, Stroudsburg
- Clinton Cemetery, New Beaver
- Dauphin County Cemetery, Harrisburg
- East Harrisburg Cemetery, Harrisburg
- Easton Cemetery, Easton
- Eden Cemetery, Collingdale
- Erie Cemetery, Erie
- Evergreen Cemetery (Adams County, Pennsylvania), Cumberland Township, Adams County
- Fair Hill Burial Ground, Philadelphia
- Fairview Cemetery, Pen Argyl
- Fern Knoll Burial Park, Dallas, Luzerne County
- Fleetwood Cemetery, Fleetwood PA
- Gettysburg National Cemetery, Gettysburg
- Glen Dyberry Cemetery, Honesdale
- Glenwood Memorial Gardens, Broomall
- Glethsemane Cemetery, Laureldale
- God's Acre Cemetery, Bethlehem (historic Moravian graveyard)
- Grandview Cemetery, Johnstown
- Greenwood Cemetery, Philadelphia
- Greenwood Cemetery, Pittsburgh
- Har Nebo Cemetery, Philadelphia
- Harrisburg Cemetery, Harrisburg
- Highland Cemetery (City of Lock Haven, Pennsylvania), Lock Haven, Clinton County
- Hillside Cemetery, Abington Township, Montgomery County, Pennsylvania
- Holy Cross Cemetery, Swatara Township, Dauphin County
- Holy Sepulchre Cemetery (Cheltenham Township, Pennsylvania), Glenside
- Homewood Cemetery, Squirrel Hill, Pittsburgh
- Indiantown Gap National Cemetery, Annville
- Ivy Hill Cemetery, Philadelphia
- Lafayette Cemetery, Philadelphia
- Laurel Hill Cemetery, Philadelphia, garden cemetery founded 1836
- Lawnview Memorial Park, Rockledge, Pennsylvania
- Lebanon Cemetery, Philadelphia
- Leverington Cemetery, Philadelphia
- Lincoln Cemetery, Chambersburg
- Lincoln Cemetery (Harrisburg, Pennsylvania)
- Lobb's Cemetery and Yohogania County Courthouse Site, West Elizabeth
- Magnolia Cemetery, Philadelphia
- Mikveh Israel Cemetery, Philadelphia, oldest Jewish cemetery in Philadelphia; founded 1738
- Mikveh Israel Cemetery (11th and Federal)
- Monongahela Cemetery, Monongahela
- Montefiore Cemetery, Montgomery County
- Montgomery Cemetery, West Norriton Township
- Monument Cemetery, Philadelphia
- Mount Carmel Cemetery, Philadelphia
- Mount Lebanon Cemetery, Philadelphia
- Mount Moriah Cemetery, Philadelphia
- Mount Olivet Cemetery, Hanover
- Mount Peace Cemetery, Philadelphia
- Mount Vernon Cemetery, Philadelphia
- National Cemetery of the Alleghenies, Bridgeville
- Norris City Cemetery, East Norriton Township
- Northwood Cemetery, Philadelphia
- Odd Fellows Cemetery, Philadelphia; founded 1849 and removed circa 1951
- Oakland Cemetery, Indiana
- Oaklands Cemetery, West Chester
- Old Swedish Burial Ground / St. Paul's Graveyard, Chester, Delaware County
- Palmer Cemetery, Philadelphia
- Paxtang Cemetery, Paxtang, Dauphin County
- Paxton Presbyterian Churchyard, Harrisburg
- Philadelphia National Cemetery, Philadelphia
- Pomfret Manor Cemetery, Sunbury
- Providence Quaker Cemetery and Chapel, Perryopolis
- Resurrection Cemetery, Wescosville
- Roosevelt Memorial Park, Trevose
- Shalom Memorial Park and Cemetery, Huntingdon Valley, Montgomery County
- Saints Peter and Paul Cemetery, Springfield
- St. John the Baptist Byzantine Catholic Cemetery, Pittsburgh
- St. Mary Cemetery, Pittsburgh
- St. Paul's Union Church and Cemetery, Ringtown
- Saint Thomas Episcopal Church Cemetery, Whitemarsh
- Slate Hill Cemetery, Morrisville
- Springdale Cemetery, Springdale
- Swissdale Cemetery, Swissdale, Clinton County
- Swissdale Evangelical Cemetery, Swissdale, Clinton County
- Trinity Cemetery, Erie
- Unity Cemetery, Latrobe
- Upper Burial Ground, Philadelphia
- Vine St. Cemetery, Hazleton
- Washington Crossing National Cemetery, Newtown
- Weatherly Cemetery, Weatherly
- West Laurel Hill Cemetery, Philadelphia
- Wildwood Cemetery, Williamsport
- The Woodlands, Philadelphia, a National Historic Landmark
- Zion United Church of Christ Cemetery, Perry Township Berks County

== Gallery ==
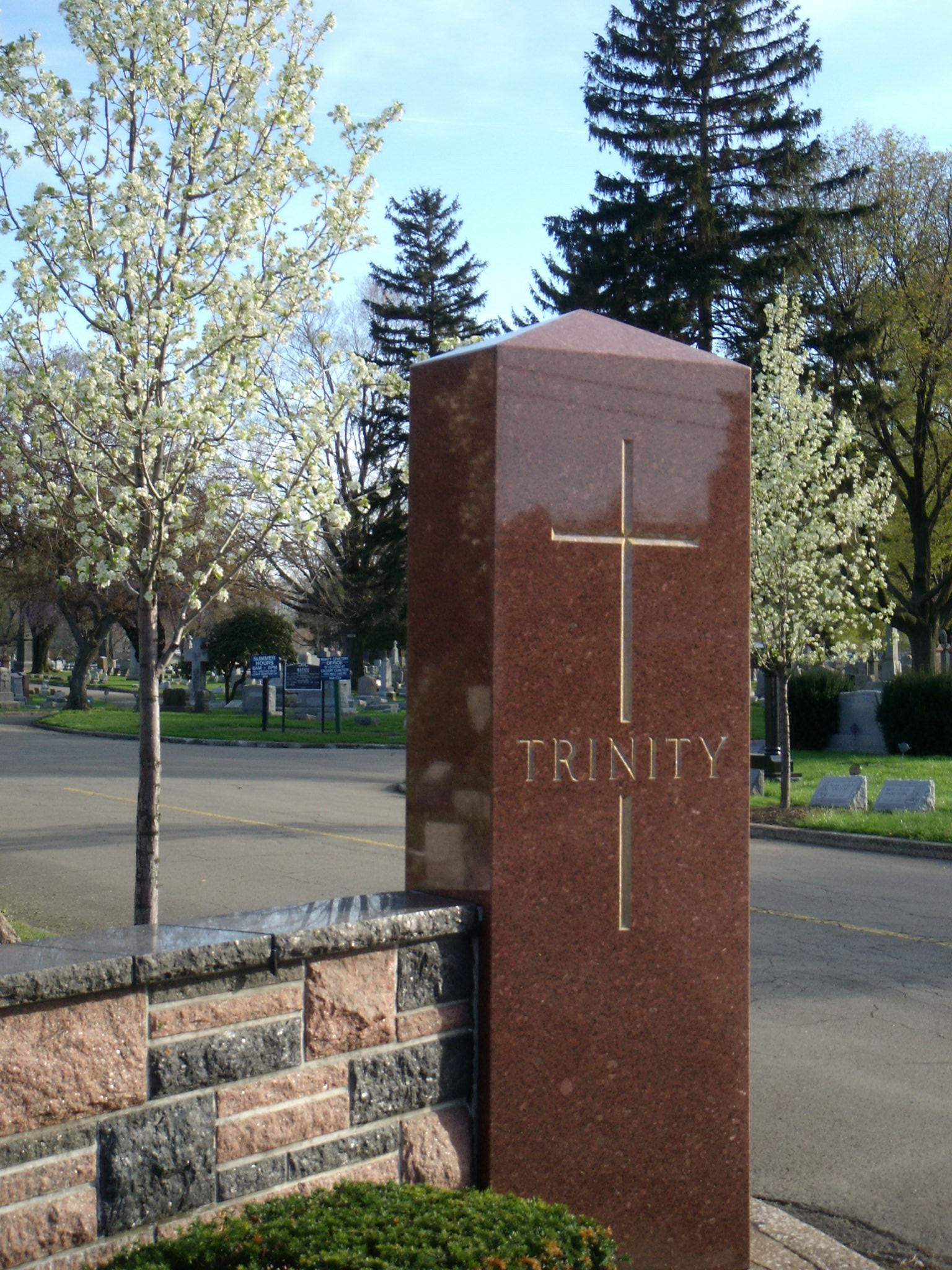
Trinity Cemetery, Erie

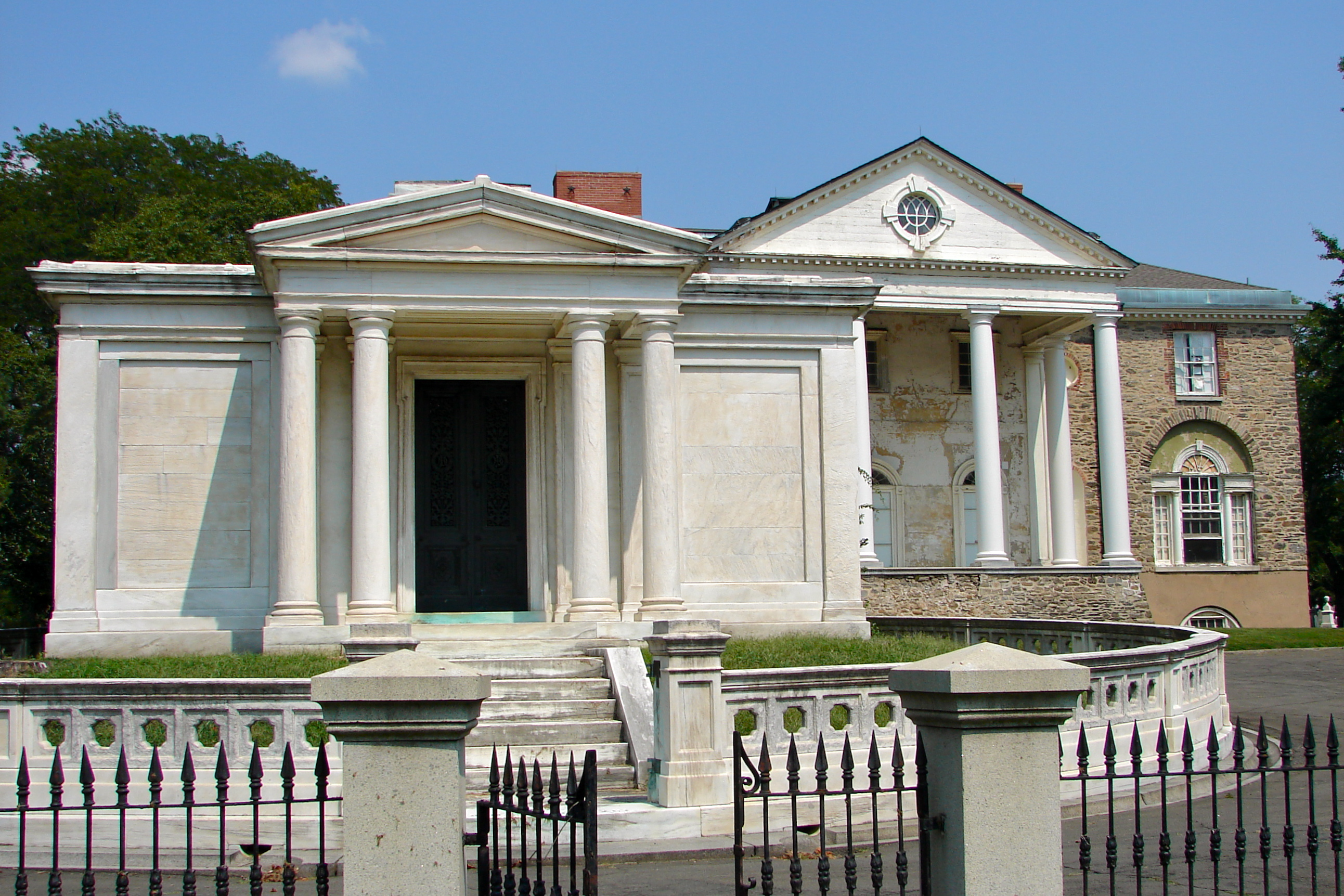
Mausoleum of Francis M. Drexel at Woodlands Cemetery

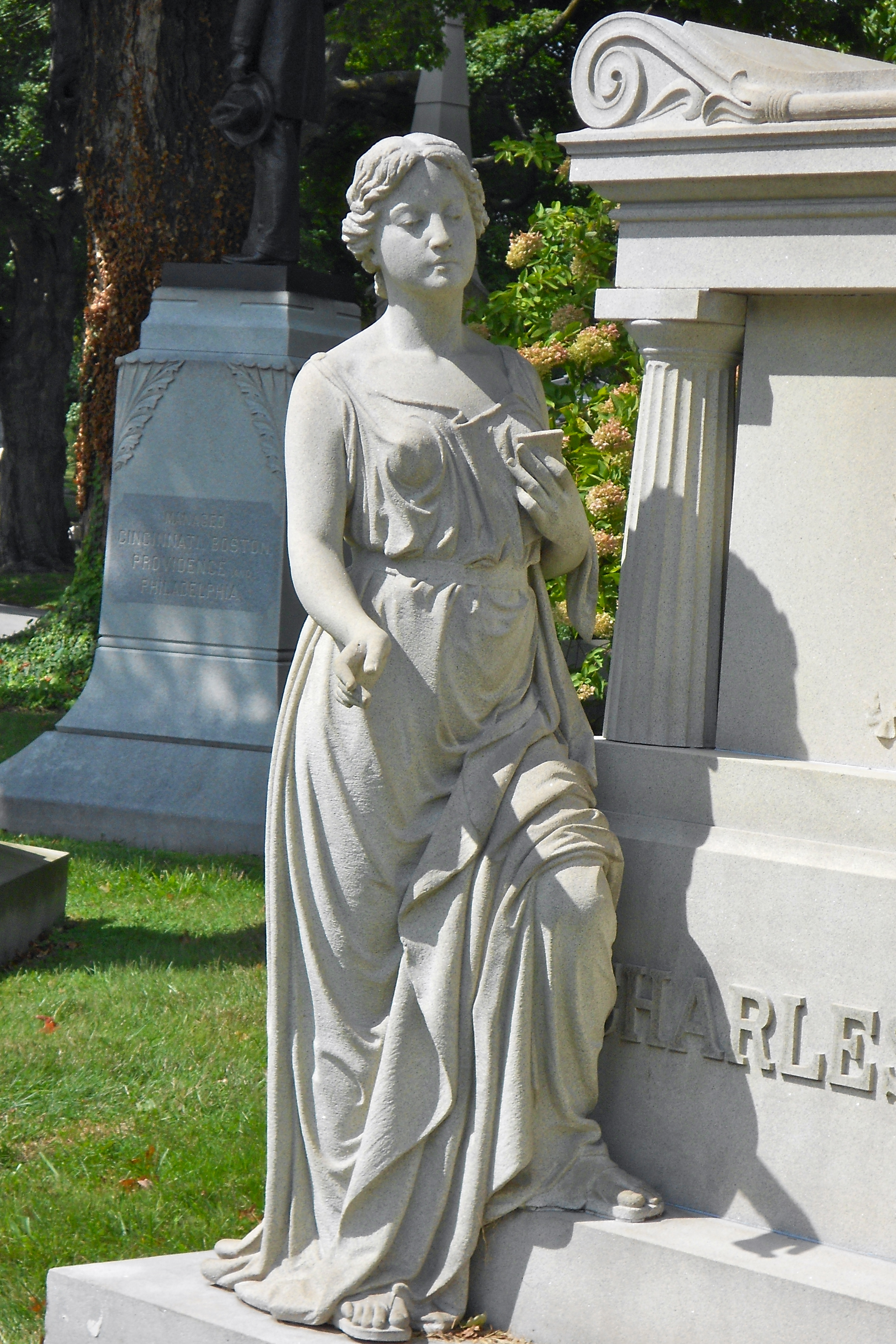
West Laurel Hill Cemetery

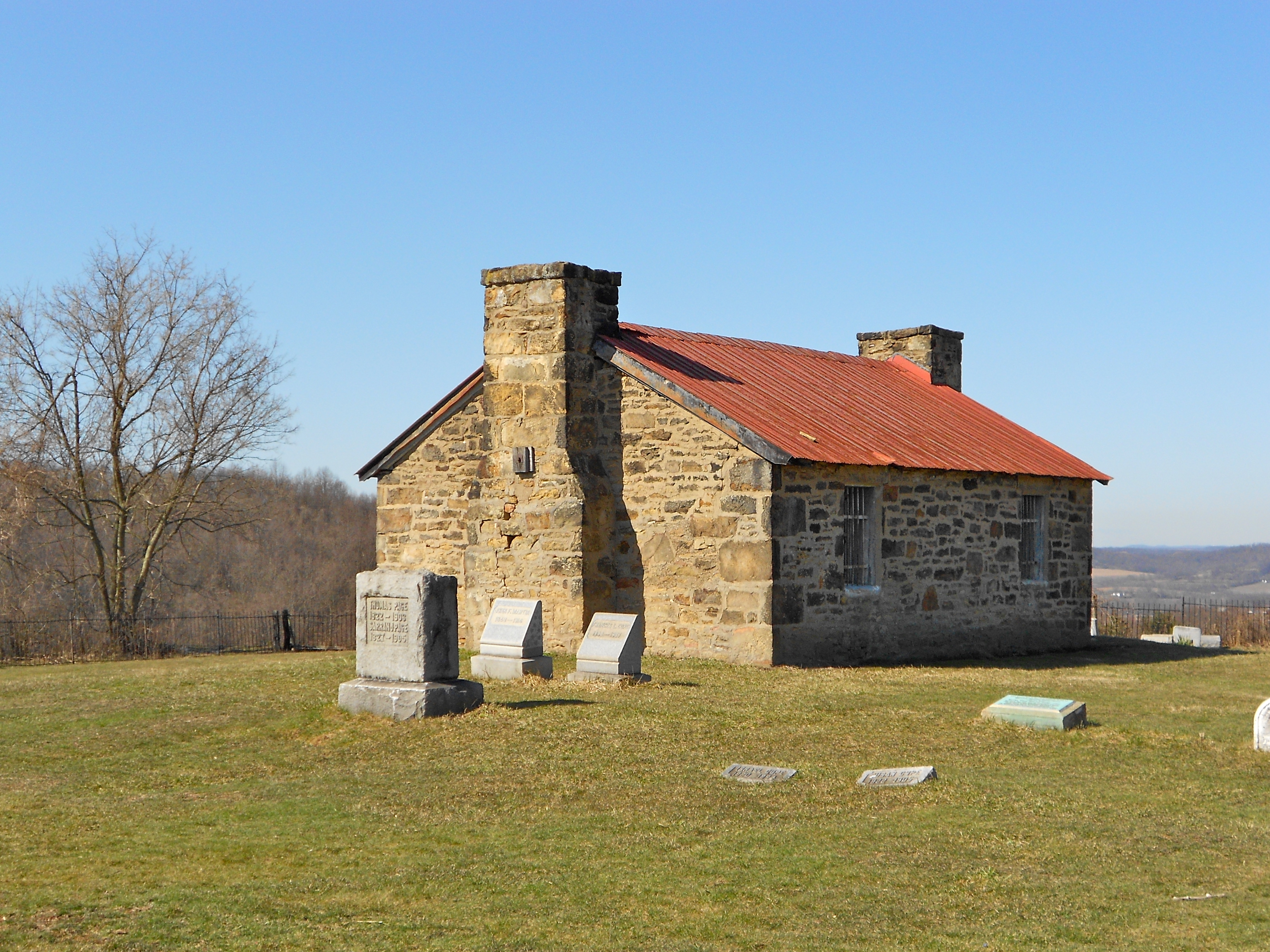
Providence Quaker Cemetery and Chapel, Perryopolis

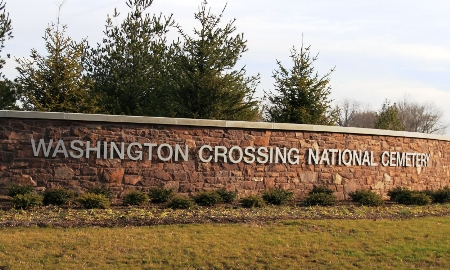
Washington Crossing National Cemetery

== See also ==
- List of cemeteries in the United States
