= James S. Biery =

American politician

James Soloman Biery
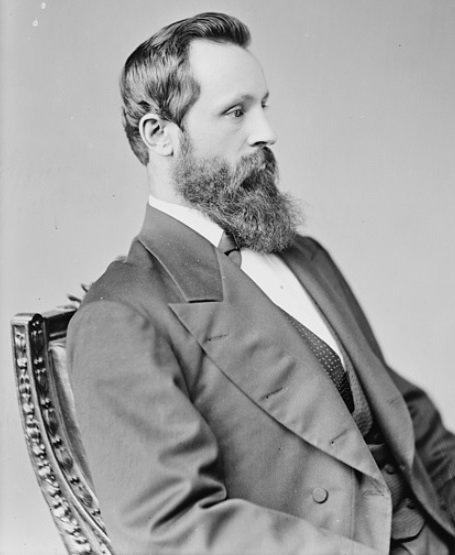

Member of the U.S. House of Representatives from Pennsylvania's 6th district
- In office March 4, 1873 – March 3, 1875
- Preceded by: Ephraim L. Acker
- Succeeded by: Washington Townsend

Member of the Pennsylvania House of Representatives
- In office 1869

Personal details
- Born: March 2, 1839 Venango County, Pennsylvania, U.S.
- Died: December 3, 1904 (aged 65) Allentown, Pennsylvania, U.S.
- Party: Republican

James Soloman Biery (March 2, 1839 – December 3, 1904) was a Republican member of the U.S. House of Representatives from Pennsylvania.

James S. Biery was born on a farm in Venango County, Pennsylvania near Emlenton. He attended district schools and Emlenton Academy. He taught school for three years in the oil regions of Pennsylvania.

In 1861, he moved to Allentown, Pennsylvania, where he continued teaching for eight years. He studied theology for two years, and subsequently studied law. He was admitted to the bar in 1868 and commenced practice in Allentown. He served as a member of the Pennsylvania State House of Representatives in 1869.

Biery was elected as a Republican to the Forty-third Congress. He was not a candidate for renomination in 1874. He resumed the practice of law at Allentown and also engaged in literary pursuits. He died in Allentown in 1904 and was interred in Fairview Cemetery in Allentown.

== Sources ==
- United States Congress. "James S. Biery (id: B000450)". Biographical Directory of the United States Congress.
- James Soloman Biery at The Political Graveyard

U.S. House of Representatives
Preceded by Ephraim L. Acker	Member of the U.S. House of Representatives from Pennsylvania's 6th congressional district 1873–1875	Succeeded by Washington Townsend
