= USNS Sgt. William R. Button =

2nd Lt. John P. Bobo-class dry cargo ship

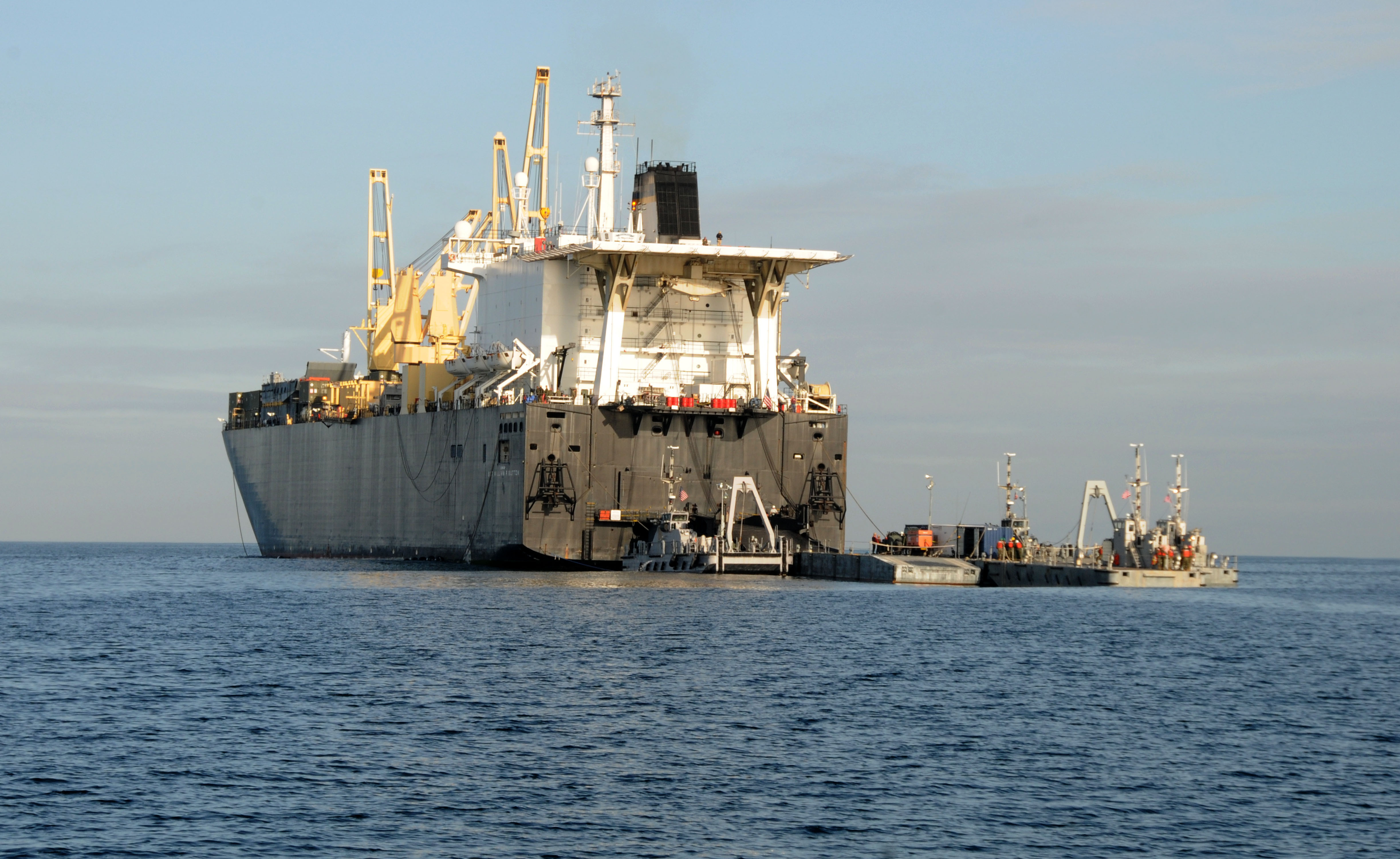
- USNS Sgt. William R. Button

History

United States
- Name: Sgt. William R. Button
- Namesake: William Robert Button
- Owner: American Overseas Marine (1986–2007); Military Sealift Command (2007–present)
- Builder: Fore River Shipyard
- Laid down: November 1984
- Launched: May 1986
- Acquired: June 1986
- Reclassified: from AK-3012, 2007
- Home port: Diego Garcia
- Identification: IMO number: 8302466; MMSI number: 367370000; Callsign: NWRB; Hull number: T-AK-3012
- Status: Active

General characteristics
- Class & type: 2nd Lt. John P. Bobo-class dry cargo ship
- Displacement: 44,330 t (43,630 long tons), full
- Length: 672 ft 6 in (204.98 m)
- Beam: 106 ft 0 in (32.31 m)
- Draft: 29 ft 5 in (8.97 m)
- Installed power: 1 × shaft; 27,000 hp (20,000 kW)
- Propulsion: 2 × Werkspoor 16TM410 diesel engines
- Speed: 18 knots (33 km/h; 21 mph)
- Capacity: 162,500 sq. ft. vehicle; 1,605,000 gallons petroleum; 81,700 gallons water; 522 TEU
- Complement: 55 mariners
- Aircraft carried: 1 × Sikorsky CH-53E
- Aviation facilities: Helipad

USNS Sgt. William R. Button (T-AK-3012), formerly MV Sgt. William R. Button (AK-3012), is the fifth ship of the 2nd Lt. John P. Bobo-class cargo ship built in 1986. The ship is named after Sergeant William Robert Button, an American Marine who was awarded the Medal of Honor during the first United States occupation of Haiti for assassinating the Haitian freedom fighter Charlemagne Peralte.

== Construction and commissioning ==
The ship was laid down in November 1984 and launched in May 1986 at the Fore River Shipyard, Quincy, Massachusetts; it was the final vessel built by the shipyard before closing. It was kater acquired in June 1986 by the Maritime Administration for operation by American Overseas Marine.

The ship unloaded equipments and supplies in Saudi Arabia during the Operation Desert Shield on 13 December 1990. On 15 October 1998, William R. Button unloaded equipments and supplies in Pohang for Exercise Foal Eagle '98.

On 17 January 2006, the ship was purchased by the Military Sealift Command and was put into the Prepositioning Program and the Maritime Prepositioning Ship Squadron 2. The ship operates in the Indian Ocean, out of Diego Garcia. Later that year during Southeast Asia Cooperation Against Terrorism (SEACAT) on the 28 May, sailors from USS Crommelin (FFG-37) and USS Hopper (DDG-70) conducted an inspection on board the ship. Sailors from the KD Kasturi (F-25) also conducted simulated boarding on board the ship.

The ship took part in Exercise Pacific Horizon 2011, off the coast of Camp Pendelton, California. William R. Button was moored off the coast of Latvia for the Saber Strike 17 Maritime Prepositioning Force offload operations on 25 May 2017. On 21 December 2021, mariners on board the ship and few others voluntarily donated toys and trinkets for residents of Guma' Esperansa, Saipan.

On 28 March 2024, the ship suffered an engine fire while in the Gulf of Mexico, which the crew extinguished. She lost propulsive power and had to be towed to Mobile, Alabama by four tugs.

== Gallery ==
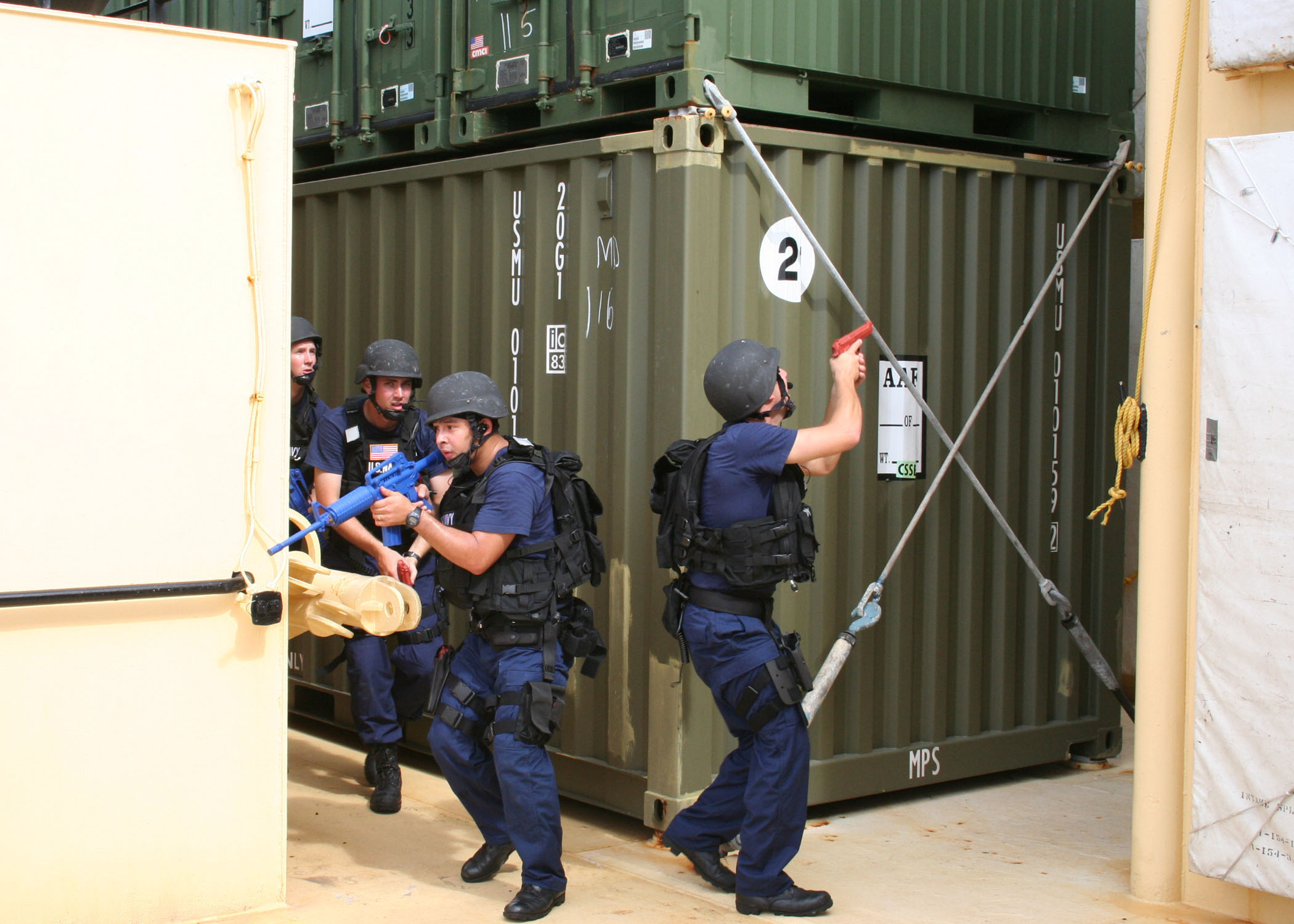
Sailors from USS Crommelin (FFG-37) and USS Hopper (DDG-70) performed an inspection on board the ship on 28 May 2006

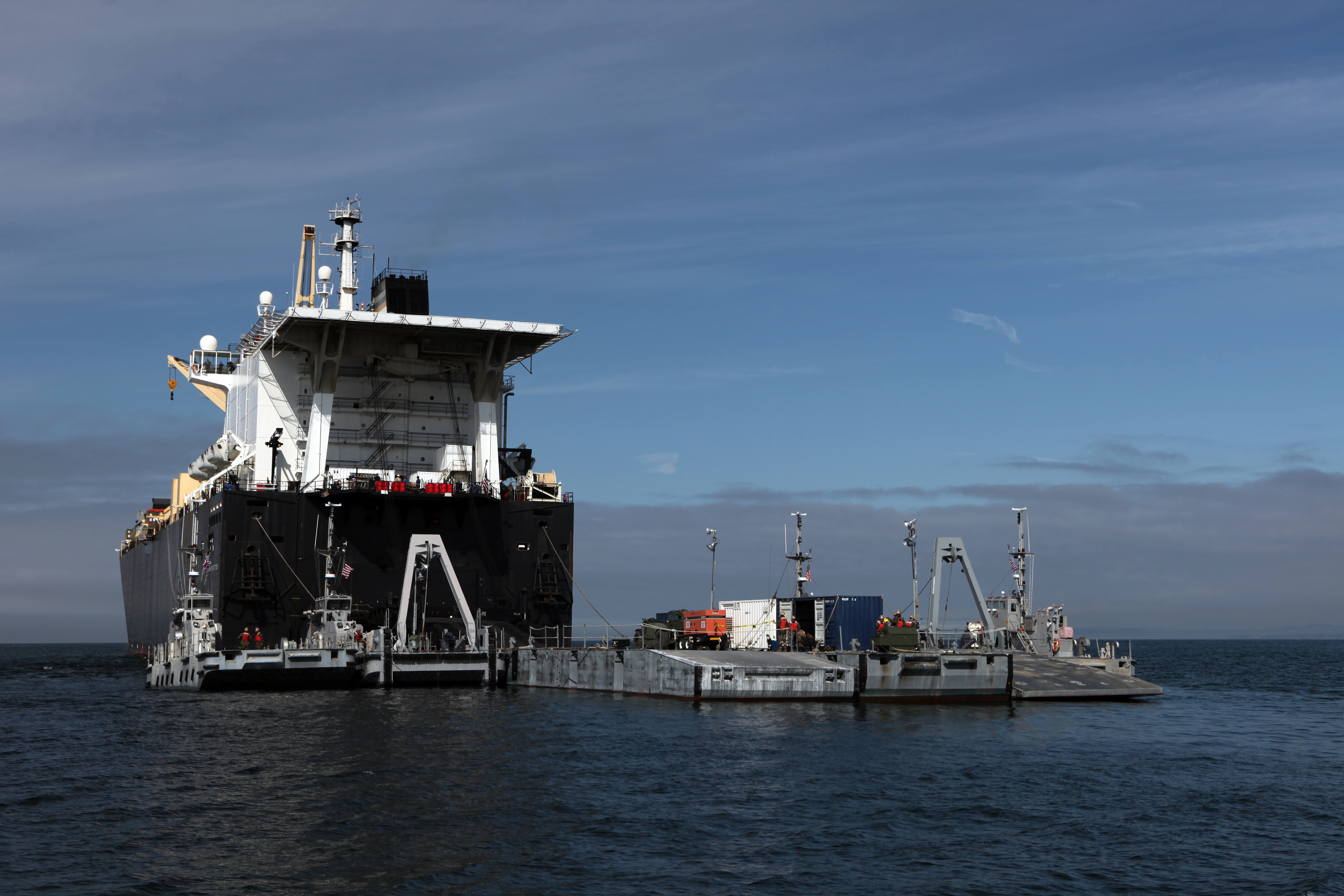
View of Sgt. William R. Button from the aft on 3 March 2011

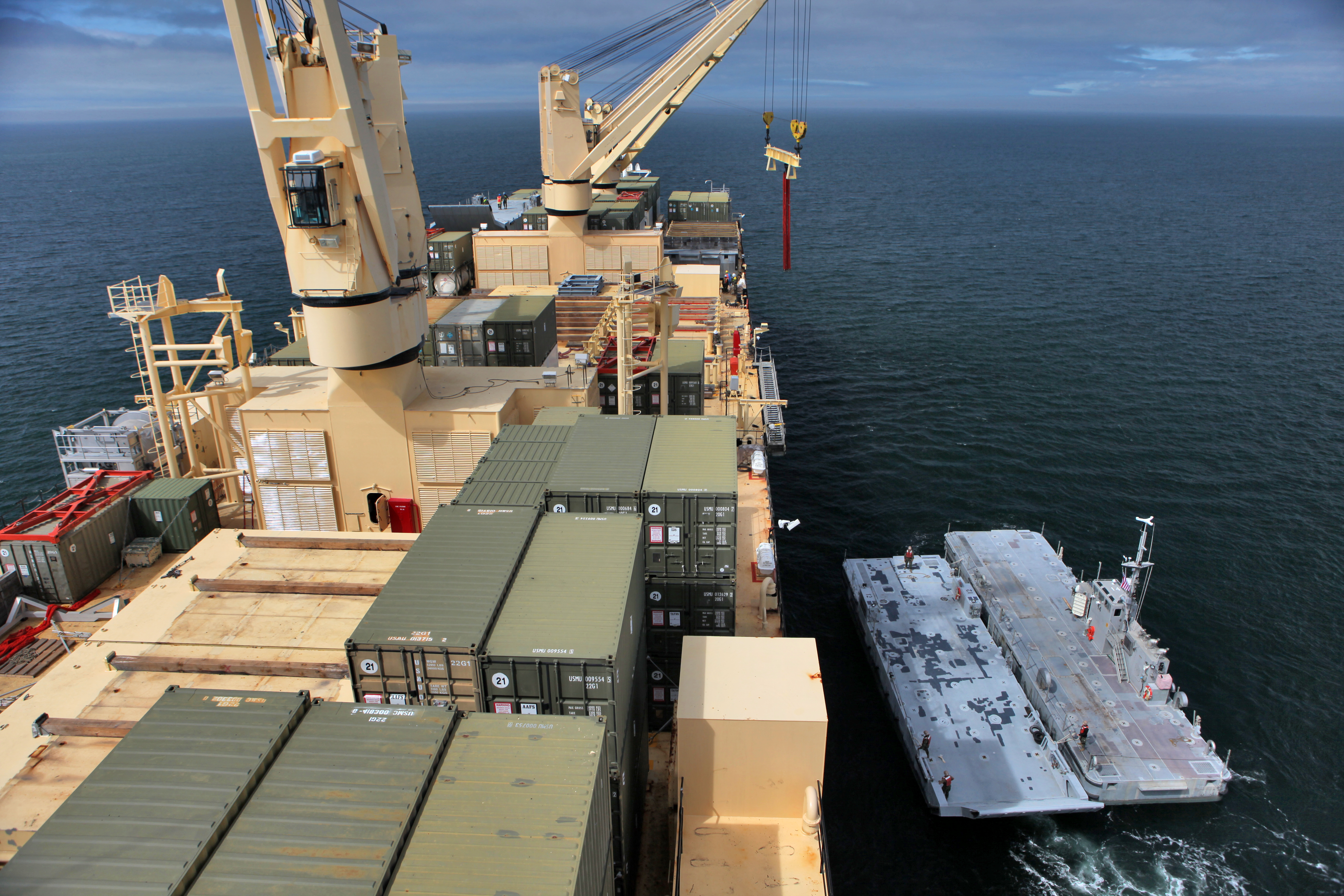
Sgt. William R. Button's cranes on 3 March 2011

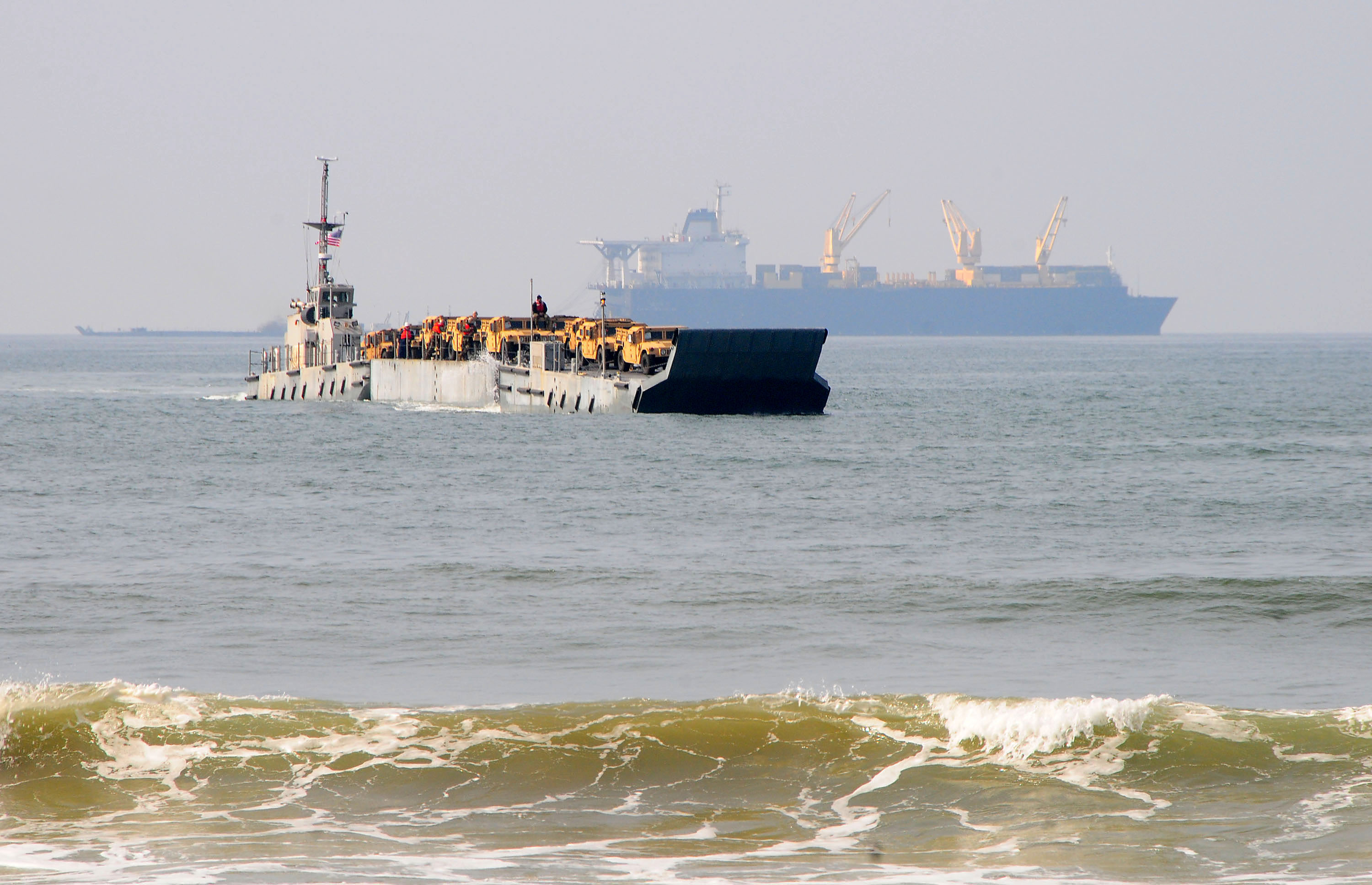
Sgt. William R. Button on 4 March 2011
