= Ross Lindsey Iams =

United States Marine Corps Medal of Honor recipient

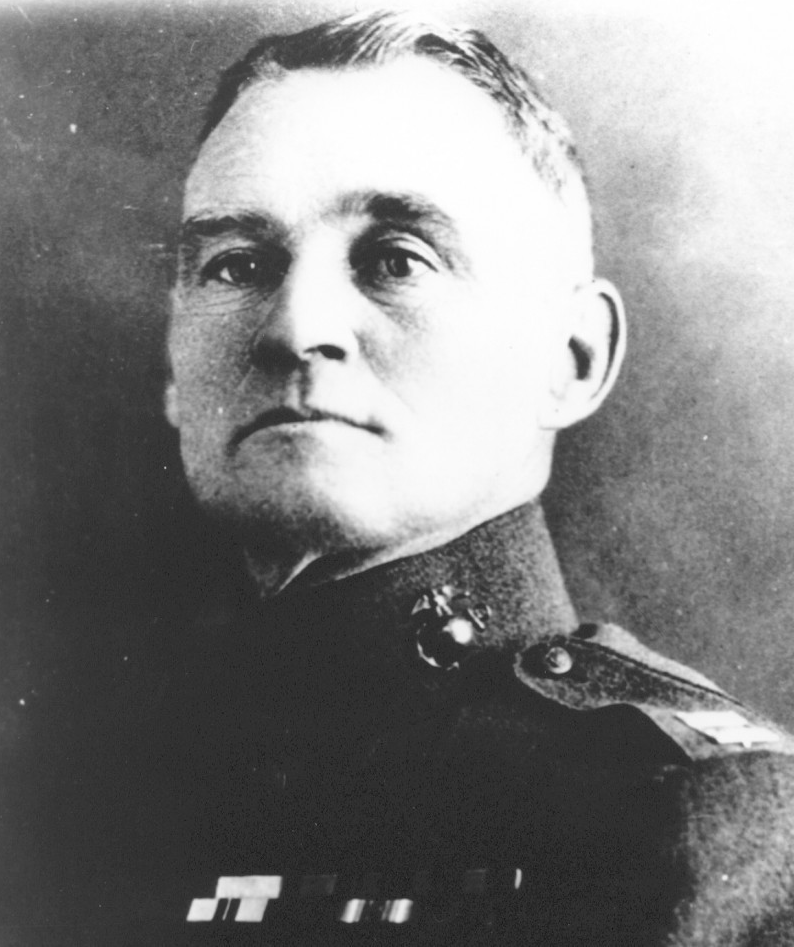
- Iams as a captain, c. 1920s
- Born: April 5, 1881; Graysville, Pennsylvania, U.S.
- Died: March 29, 1952 (aged 70); San Diego, California, U.S.
- Burial place: Fort Rosecrans National Cemetery, San Diego, California, U.S.
- Military career
- Allegiance: United States of America
- Branch: United States Marine Corps
- Service years: 1901–1932; 1942
- Rank: Major
- Unit: 2nd Marine Regiment
- Conflicts: Banana Wars; Occupation of Haiti; Battle of Fort Rivière; Occupation of Nicaragua; World War I; World War II
- Awards: Medal of Honor

Ross Lindsey Iams (April 5, 1881 – March 25, 1952) was a United States Marine who was awarded the Medal of Honor for actions during the Battle of Fort Rivière in Haiti on November 17, 1915. Iams served for over 30 years in the Marine Corps, retiring as a major.

== Biography ==
Iams was born in Graysville, Pennsylvania. He enlisted in the Marine Corps in Pittsburgh on January 29, 1901. By 1906, Iams had been promoted to corporal and was stationed in Norfolk, Virginia.

During the United States occupation of Haiti in 1915, Sergeant Iams was assigned to the 5th Marine Company. During the Battle of Fort Rivière on November 17, Iams was part of Major Smedley Butler's 100-man task force charged with destroying the mountaintop stronghold of Cacos rebels, mercenaries who had been threatening the Haitian government. Butler, Iams, and Butler's orderly, Private Samuel Gross, located a partially sealed drain 4 feet (1.2 m) wide, 3 feet (0.91 m) tall, and 15 feet (4.6 m) deep in the fort's wall, which served as a Cacos entrance. Butler hesitated in entering the hole, knowing the Marines would be exposed to concentrated enemy fire. After a pause, Iams said, "Oh, hell, I'm going through," (Note: In 1917, Assistant Secretary of the Navy Franklin D. Roosevelt traveled to Haiti to write a report for Butler's Medal of Honor citation. Roosevelt quoted the unnamed "old sergeant" with Butler as saying, "Sir, I was in the Marines before you and it is my privilege," before entering the hole first. This fanciful quotation, if indeed uttered by Iams, would have been mistaken, as Butler joined the Marines three years before Iams. Historian Hans Schmidt called Roosevelt's report "hyperbolized," citing his marked deflation of the size of Butler's force and the inflation of the casualties of the battle.) and was immediately followed by Gross and Butler.

Crawling out the other side, the trio of Marines began firing on the surprised Cacos rebels, and were followed by the rest of Butler's company. After ten minutes of intense close quarters combat, the American force had killed the entire Cacos garrison, and later dynamited the fort, ending the First Caco War. For his heroism in combat, Iams—along with Gross and Butler—was awarded the Medal of Honor.

Iams was stationed in France in 1918–1919 during World War I, and also served in Mexico, China, the Philippines and Nicaragua. After several temporary appointments as a junior officer, Iams was permanently commissioned as a captain in June 1920. He retired from the Marine Corps in November 1932, but in 1942, he briefly returned to duty as a major during World War II. He died at the U.S. Naval Hospital in San Diego, California on March 29, 1952, aged 70. He was buried at Fort Rosecrans National Cemetery in San Diego.

== Medal of Honor citation ==
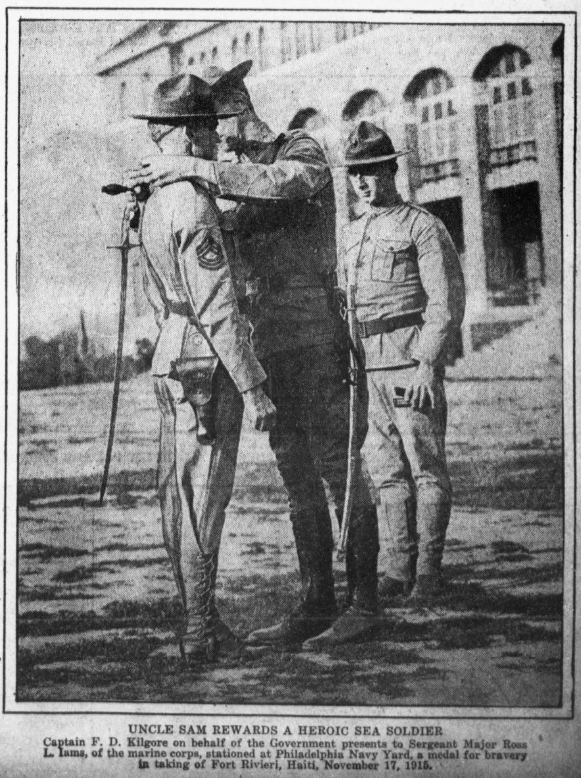
Sergeant Major Iams being awarded the Medal of Honor in 1917

Rank and organization: Sergeant, US Marine Corps, 5th Company
Born: 5 May 1879, Graysville, Pennsylvania. Accredited to: Pennsylvania.

Citation:

In company with members of the Fifth, Thirteenth, Twenty-Third Companies and Marine and sailor detachment from the USS Connecticut, Sergeant Iams participated in the attack on Fort Riviere, Haiti, November 17, 1915. Following a concentrated drive, several different detachments of Marines gradually closed in on the old French bastion fort in an effort to cut off all avenues of retreat for the Caco bandits. Approaching a breach in the wall which was the only entrance to the fort, Sergeant Iams unhesitatingly jumped through the breach despite constant fire from the Cacos and engaged the enemy in a desperate hand-to-hand combat until the bastion was captured and Caco resistance neutralized.

== See also ==
- List of Medal of Honor recipients
