= Samuel Gross (Medal of Honor) =

United States Marine Corps Medal of Honor recipient

- Gross (right) breaching Fort Rivière with Maj. Smedley Butler, as painted by Donna Neary
- Born: Samuel Margulies; May 9, 1891; Philadelphia, Pennsylvania, U.S.
- Died: September 13, 1934 (aged 43); Coatesville, Pennsylvania, U.S.
- Burial place: Har Nebo Cemetery; Philadelphia, Pennsylvania, U.S.
- Military career
- Allegiance: United States of America
- Branch: United States Marine Corps
- Service years: 1913–1918
- Rank: Corporal
- Unit: 2nd Marine Regiment
- Conflicts: Banana Wars; Battle of Veracruz; Occupation of Haiti; Battle of Fort Dipitié; Battle of Fort Rivière; World War I
- Awards: Medal of Honor

Samuel Gross (né Margulies; May 9, 1891 – September 13, 1934) was a United States Marine who earned the Medal of Honor for his actions at the Battle of Fort Rivière in 1915, during the United States occupation of Haiti.

== Biography ==
Gross was born Samuel Margulies in a Jewish family in Philadelphia, Pennsylvania. He left the home of his disciplinarian father at a young age, and on June 2, 1913, enlisted in the Marine Corps in Norfolk, Virginia, giving his surname as "Gross." Private Gross participated in the Battle of Veracruz in 1914, and shortly thereafter began service as the orderly of Major Smedley Butler.

Gross accompanied Butler during the United States occupation of Haiti, fighting in the Battle of Fort Dipitié on October 24–25, 1915. The Marines destroyed a stronghold of Cacos rebels, mercenaries who had been threatening the Haitian government. Before the battle, while the Marines were encamped, an exhausted Butler had fallen asleep on the riverbank and plunged into the water, and was pulled to safety by Gross.

During the Battle of Fort Rivière on November 17, Gross accompanied Butler as part of a 100-man task force sent to destroy a mountaintop garrison sheltering the last remaining Cacos force. In the midst of the fighting, Butler's company found a partially sealed drain 4 feet (1.2 m) wide, 3 feet (0.91 m) tall, and 15 feet (4.6 m) deep in the fort's wall, which served as a Cacos entrance. Sergeant Ross Lindsey Iams and Gross were the first through the tunnel, followed by Butler, and the trio immediately began firing on the surprised rebels. After Butler missed a large Cacos with his pistol, Gross killed the rebel with his rifle before he could strike a devastating blow to Butler's head with a club. After ten minutes of intense close quarters combat, the American force had killed the entire Cacos garrison, and later dynamited the fort, ending the First Caco War. For his heroism in combat, Gross was awarded the Medal of Honor.

Gross remained in Haiti for another year and was promoted to corporal in December 1916. In May 1917, he was honorably discharged from the Marine Corps. He re-enlisted in March 1918, but was discharged again in September due to epilepsy, for which he was hospitalized for the rest of his life. In 1930, a partially paralyzed Gross reunited with Butler during one of Butler's lectures in Coatesville, Pennsylvania. Gross died at a veterans' hospital in Coatesville on September 13, 1934, and was buried in Philadelphia's Har Nebo Cemetery. His grave was unmarked until 1983, when a headstone was erected by the Jewish War Veterans of the United States of America. Although there are no known photographs of Gross, he is depicted in the painting Capture of Ft. Rivière 1915 by Donna Neary, displayed at the National Museum of the Marine Corps.

== Medal of Honor citation ==
Rank and organization: Private, U.S. Marine Corps, 23d Co.
Born: May 9, 1891, Philadelphia, Pa. Accredited to: Pennsylvania.

Citation:

In company with members of the 5th, 13th, 23d Companies and the marine and sailor detachment from the USS Connecticut, Gross participated in the attack on Fort Riviere, Haiti, November 17, 1915. Following a concentrated drive, several different detachments of marines gradually closed in on the old French bastion fort in an effort to cut off all avenues of retreat for the Caco bandits. Approaching a breach in the wall which was the only entrance to the fort, Gross was the second man to pass through the breach in the face of constant fire from the Cacos and, thereafter, for a 10-minute period, engaged the enemy in desperate hand-to-hand combat until the bastion was captured and Caco resistance neutralized.

== See also ==
- List of Medal of Honor recipients
- List of Jewish Medal of Honor recipients
