= Mt. Carmel Cemetery (Philadelphia) =

Jewish cemetery in Pennsylvania

Mount Carmel Cemetery
- Interactive map of Mount Carmel Cemetery

Details
- Location: Frankford Avenue and Cheltenham Avenue, Philadelphia, Pennsylvania, U.S.
- Country: United States
- Type: private
- Size: 5 acres (2.0 ha)
- No. of graves: 8,000

Mount Carmel Cemetery is a Jewish cemetery in the Wissinoming neighborhood of Philadelphia, Pennsylvania, United States. It was established in the mid-1800s.The earliest recorded burial at Mount Carmel Cemetery was in 1832. The cemetery was mainly a burial site for Jewish immigrants from Russia.

The management of the cemetery was taken over by nearby Har Nebo Cemetery.

== Vandalism ==
The cemetery was desecrated in October 1982 by semi-literate vandals who knocked about 100 headstones over, left empty beer bottles, and marked a headstone with two swastikas and "Hile Hitler"(sic).

"Wave of Anti Semitic Threats Puts U.S Jewish Community on Edge," a March 21, 2017 Voice of America report

The cemetery was vandalized again on February 25, 2017, when more than 250 headstones were overturned and damaged. The incident caused concern, as it came less than a week after a vandal toplped and dismembered more than 150 gravestones at the Chesed Shel Emeth Jewish Cemetery in Philadelphia.

Governor of Pennsylvania Tom Wolf released a statement saying, "The vandalism of Jewish headstones at a Phila. cemetery is a cowardly, disturbing act. We must find those responsible and hold accountable." Philadelphia Mayor Jim Kenney stated, "I encourage Philadelphians to stand with our Jewish brothers and sisters and to show them that we are the City of Brotherly Love and Sisterly Affection."

The repairs from 2017 were never completed. As of July 2020, the cemetery lies in a state of disrepair and neglect.

== See also ==
- History of the Jews in Pennsylvania
- List of cemeteries in Pennsylvania
