= Battle of Fort Dipitié =

Banana Wars, US occupation of Haiti (October 1915)

- Part of the United States occupation of Haiti, Banana Wars
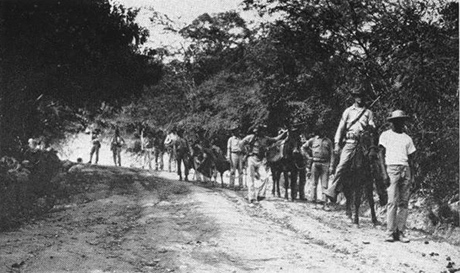
- U.S. Marines and a Haitian guide on patrol in 1915
Date	24–25 October 1915
Location	Fort Dipitié, Haiti
Result	American victory

Belligerents
United States	(Republic of Haiti (1859–1957)) Cacos

Commanders and leaders
(United States) Smedley Butler	(Republic of Haiti (1859–1957)) Unknown

Strength
40 marines; 1 machine gun	400 militia; 1 fort

Casualties and losses
1 wounded; 1 horse	75 killed; 1 fort captured

The Battle of Fort Dipitié was fought on 24–25 October 1915 as part of the First Caco War during United States occupation of Haiti. United States Marines and rebel Haitians, known as Cacos, fought near the Grande Rivière du Nord which resulted in the destruction of Fort Dipitié, an outpost of Fort Capois.

== Background ==
By 1915, Cacos insurgents had been disrupting Haitian politics for generations. The Cacos descended from runaway slaves and lived in quasi-military tribes in the northern and central mountains of Haiti. They sustained themselves by banditry, but also acted as mercenaries in the employ of any revolutionary faction that wanted to threaten the National Palace, often changing sides abruptly to work for the highest bidder. The Cacos had threatened the Haitian government three times in 1914, prompting President Oreste Zamor to request military assistance from the United States.

== Battle ==
On 22 October 1915, Colonel Littleton Waller, commander of the 1st Provisional Marine Brigade, dispatched Major Smedley Butler on a reconnaissance mission with orders to make a large circular sweep around Fort Liberté, in the mountainous jungle of northeastern Haiti, to root out any Cacos insurgents. On 24 October, the force of 40 mounted Marines paid a Haitian guide to lead them to Fort Capois, a major Cacos stronghold. As the Marines forded the Grande Rivière du Nord in total darkness near Fort Capois, they were ambushed by some 400 Cacos with rifles and machetes. Although the Marines managed to escape to high ground and set up a defensive perimeter, the horse carrying their only machine gun had been killed. Gunnery Sergeant Daniel Daly took it upon himself to retrieve the weapon from the river, as Butler recalled:

[Daly] quietly disappeared without my knowledge. We were at least a mile from the place where we had crossed the river...With bandits continually shooting at him, he swam the river until he found the machine gun on a dead horse near the bank. He coolly and deliberately strapped the gun on his back, picked up the ammunition and climbed up to rejoin us. I wouldn't have had the courage to do it. Remember, he went back on his own initiative without a hint or suggestion from me. For this amazing stunt I recommended him for the Medal of Honor.

Facing a large enemy force and having lost all their pack animals and provisions in the river, the Marines spent a tense night on the defensive in the jungle. Cacos patrols harassed them constantly, with Butler writing that "a howling mass of natives would dash by us and slash through the bushes with knives and bayonets." The Cacos continually blew conch shells and yelled out, keeping the Marines on edge. "Our interpreter explained that they intended to chop us into small pieces when they caught us," Butler wrote.

Butler planned a counterattack for dawn on 25 October. The Cacos force was entrenched at Fort Dipitié, an outpost of Fort Capois, 350 yards (320 m) from the Marine position. Butler's orders were to charge straight forward at first light and "shoot everyone in sight." The Marine force was divided into three squads, led by Captain William P. Upshur, First Lieutenant Edward A. Ostermann, and Gunnery Sergeant Daly, with each attacking from a different direction. Butler described the chaos:

We knocked the hell out of them. We carried the fort at a run. You never heard such a damn racket. We killed about seventy-five cacos and the rest took to the bushes. But the marines went wild after their devilish night and hunted the cacos down like pigs.

== Aftermath ==
This action resulted in the capture and destruction of Fort Dipitié, with the Marines suffering only one man wounded. For their actions in battle, Upshur, Ostermann, and Daly received the Medal of Honor; the award was Daly's second, having earned his first in the Boxer Rebellion fifteen years prior. Major Butler and his men returned to base at Cap-Haïtien, and in the next few weeks proceeded to capture Forts Capois, Selon, and Berthol before the decisive Battle of Fort Rivière, the engagement which ended the First Caco War.

== See also ==
- Banana Wars
