= Ephraim Acker =

American politician (1827–1903)

Ephraim Leister Acker
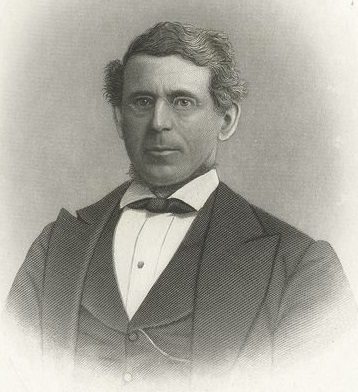

Member of the U.S. House of Representatives from Pennsylvania's 6th district
- In office March 4, 1871 – March 3, 1873
- Preceded by: John D. Stiles
- Succeeded by: James S. Biery

Personal details
- Born: January 11, 1827 Marlborough Township, Pennsylvania
- Died: May 12, 1903 (aged 76)
- Party: Democratic
- Education: Marshall College

Ephraim Leister Acker (January 11, 1827 – May 12, 1903) was an American newspaperman and educator who served one term as a Democratic member of the U.S. House of Representatives from Pennsylvania from 1871 to 1873.

== Early life and career ==
Ephraim L. Acker was born in Marlborough Township, Pennsylvania. He attended the common schools and the academy at Sumneytown, a village in Marlborough Township. He graduated from Marshall College in Mercersburg, Pennsylvania, in 1847. He was a school teacher for two years, and graduated from the University of Pennsylvania School of Medicine in Philadelphia in March 1852. He was editor and publisher of the Norristown Register from 1853 to 1877.

He served as superintendent of the schools of Montgomery County, Pennsylvania, from June 1854 to June 1860. He was appointed postmaster of Norristown, Pennsylvania in March 1860 by President James Buchanan and after serving eleven months was removed by President Abraham Lincoln. He served as inspector of Montgomery County Prison for three years.

== Congress ==
Acker was elected as a Democrat to the Forty-second Congress. He was an unsuccessful candidate for reelection in 1872.

== Later career and death ==
He resumed the publication of his newspaper until 1877, when he began the study of law, graduating from the University of Pennsylvania Law School in 1886. He was admitted to the bar and practiced until his death in Norristown in 1903. He was interred in Norris City Cemetery in East Norriton Township.

== Sources ==
- United States Congress. "Ephraim Acker (id: A000020)". Biographical Directory of the United States Congress.
- The Political Graveyard

U.S. House of Representatives
Preceded by John D. Stiles	Member of the U.S. House of Representatives from Pennsylvania's 6th congressional district 1871–1873	Succeeded by James S. Biery
