= Edward Albert Ostermann =

United States Marine Corps general and Medal of Honor recipient

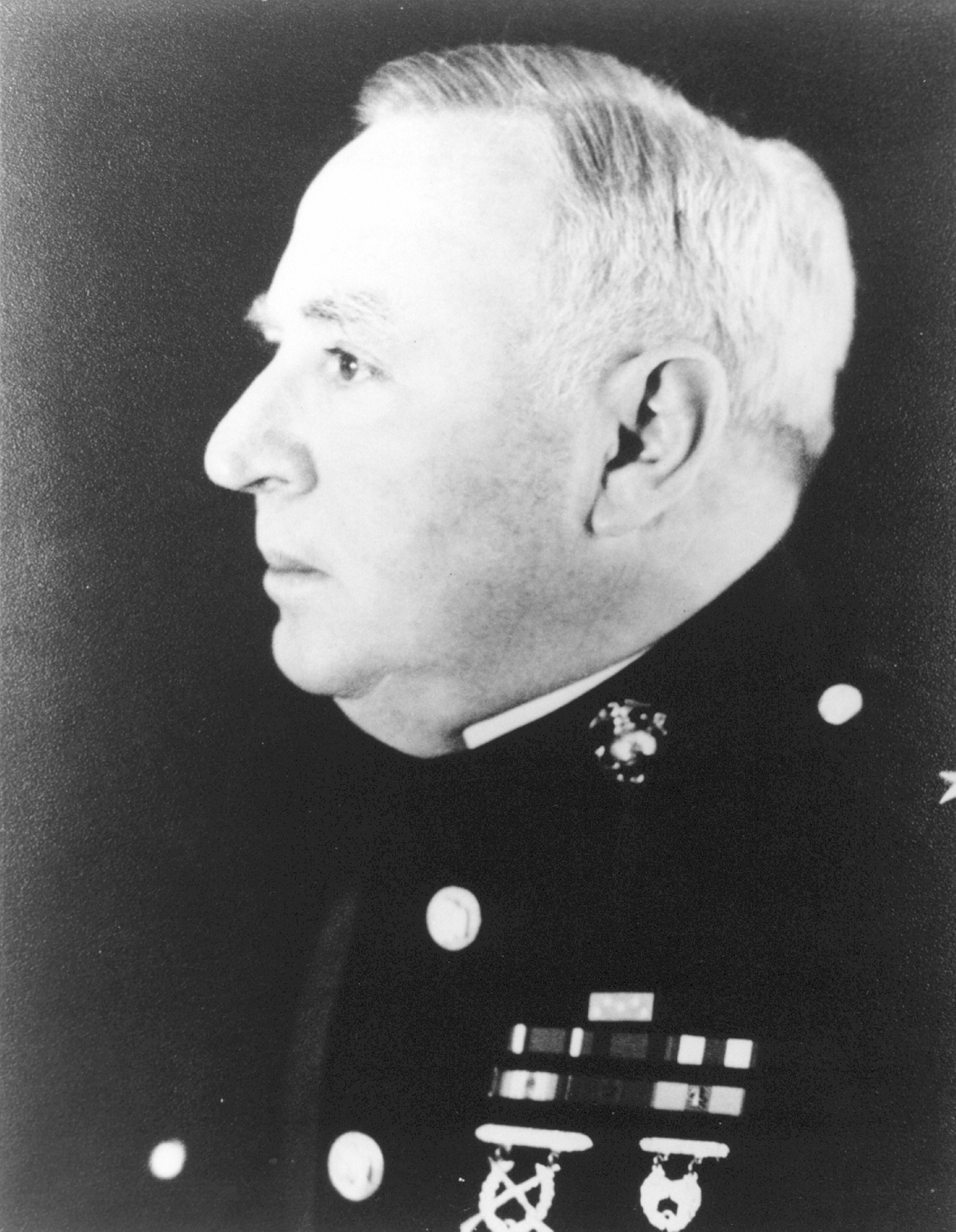
- General Edward A. Ostermann
- Born: November 23, 1882; Columbus, Ohio, US
- Died: May 18, 1969 (aged 86)
- Burial place: Arlington National Cemetery
- Military career
- Allegiance: United States of America
- Branch: United States Marine Corps (1907–1943); United States Army (1899–1902, 1904–1905)
- Service years: 1899–1902, 1904–1905; 1907–1943
- Rank: Chief trumpeter (Army); Major general (Marine Corps)
- Unit: 2nd Marine Regiment
- Conflicts: United States occupation of Haiti • Battle of Fort Dipitie
- Awards: Medal of Honor; Purple Heart

Edward Albert Ostermann (November 23, 1882 – May 18, 1969) was a United States Marine Corps major general who received the Medal of Honor for his actions during the U.S. occupation of Haiti.

Ostermann began his military career in the United States Army in 1899, was commissioned an officer in the U.S. Marine Corps in 1907, and retired as a major general in 1943.

== Early life and Army service ==
Ostermann was born in Columbus, Ohio, on November 23, 1882. He attended the public schools of Milo, Columbus, and Dayton, Ohio. After attending Ohio Northern University at Ada for two and a half years, he enlisted in the U.S. Army on October 21, 1899, and served as a musician. Discharged as chief trumpeter at the expiration of a three-year enlistment, he remained a civilian for about one and a half years and then reenlisted in the Army on April 28, 1904. He was honorably discharged by purchase on November 12, 1905, as a chief trumpeter with the First Band, Artillery Corps.

== Marine Corps career ==
Ostermann accepted a second lieutenant's commission in the Marine Corps on March 20, 1907, and served continuously until his retirement as a major general on January 1, 1943. His long career took him to Cuba, Panama, China, Nicaragua, Mexico, Haiti, Hawaii, and the Philippines.

He was awarded the Medal of Honor in 1917 for his actions during the capture of Fort Dipitie, Haiti, on October 24, 1915. He was part of a mounted Marine detachment sent out from Fort Liberté to reconnoiter towards Fort Dipitie. As the group crossed a river in a deep ravine on the night of October 24, they were suddenly fired upon from three sides by about 400 Haitian rebels, known as "Cacos", concealed in the bushes about 100 yards (91 m) from Fort Dipitie. The Marines fought their way forward to a good position and maintained it throughout the night despite continuous hostile fire. At dawn, three squads of Marines commanded by Ostermann, Captain William P. Upshur, and Gunnery Sergeant Daniel Daly advanced in three different directions, surprising and scattering the Cacos in all directions. Upshur's and Ostermann's squads then captured the fort with a total of 13 Marines. Fort Dipitie was demolished and burned and the garrison was forced to flee. "These men were in pitch darkness surrounded by ten times their number and fighting for their lives…" a description relates, "…Had one squad failed, not one man of the party would have lived to tell the story…" Ostermann, Upshur (who also lived to become a general), and Daly (the recipient of two Medals of Honor) all received the Medal of Honor for that battle.

Later in the Haitian campaign, on November 11, 1915, Ostermann was wounded in action and returned to the United States for hospitalization.

Ordered to Washington, D.C., in 1938 to become the assistant adjutant and inspector of the Marine Corps, he was advanced to the post of adjutant and inspector with the rank of brigadier general in February 1939. With the coming of World War II, Ostermann requested combat duty as either a brigadier general or a colonel. In refusing the request as "impracticable at this time", the Commandant of the Marine Corps expressed his appreciation to Ostermann.

Ostermann was retired because of physical disability on January 1, 1943. Because of having been "specially commended for his performance of duty in actual combat" by virtue of the award of the Medal of Honor, Ostermann was promoted to the rank of major general on the retired list.

Ostermann died on May 18, 1969, and was buried at Arlington National Cemetery, in Arlington, Virginia.

== Awards ==
Ostermann earned the following medals and decorations: Medal of Honor, Purple Heart, Army of Cuban Pacification Medal, Marine Corps Expeditionary Medal with two service stars, Mexican Service Medal, Nicaraguan Campaign Medal, Haitian Campaign Medal, World War I Victory Medal with West Indies clasp, American Defense Service Medal, American Campaign Medal, World War II Victory Medal, and the Republic of Haiti's Distinguished Service Medal in the grade of Officer.

Medal of Honor		Purple Heart	Marine Corps Expeditionary Medal w/ 2 service stars
Cuban Pacification Medal	Nicaraguan Campaign Medal (1912)	Mexican Service Medal	World War I Victory Medal w/ West Indies clasp
American Defense Service Medal	American Campaign Medal	World War II Victory Medal	Haitian Distinguished Service Order, Officer

=== Medal of Honor citation ===
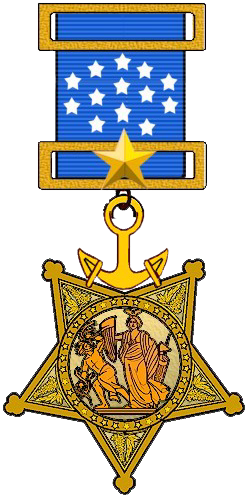
Medal of Honor

Ostermann's official Medal of Honor citation reads:

In company with members of the Fifteenth Company of Marines, all mounted, First Lieutenant Ostermann left Fort Liberte, Haiti, for a 6-day reconnaissance. After dark on the evening of 24 October 1915, while crossing the river in a deep ravine, the detachment was suddenly fired upon from 3 sides by about 400 Cacos concealed in bushes about 100 yards from the fort. The Marine detachment fought its way forward to a good position, which it maintained during the night, although subjected to a continuous fire from the Cacos. At daybreak, First Lieutenant Ostermann, in command of one of the three squads which advanced in three different directions, led his men forward, surprising and scattering the Cacos, and aiding in the capture of Fort Dipitie.

== See also ==
- List of Medal of Honor recipients during the occupation of Haiti
