= Battle of Fort Rivière =

1915 battle during the First Caco War in US occupied Haiti

- Part of the US occupation of Haiti, Banana Wars
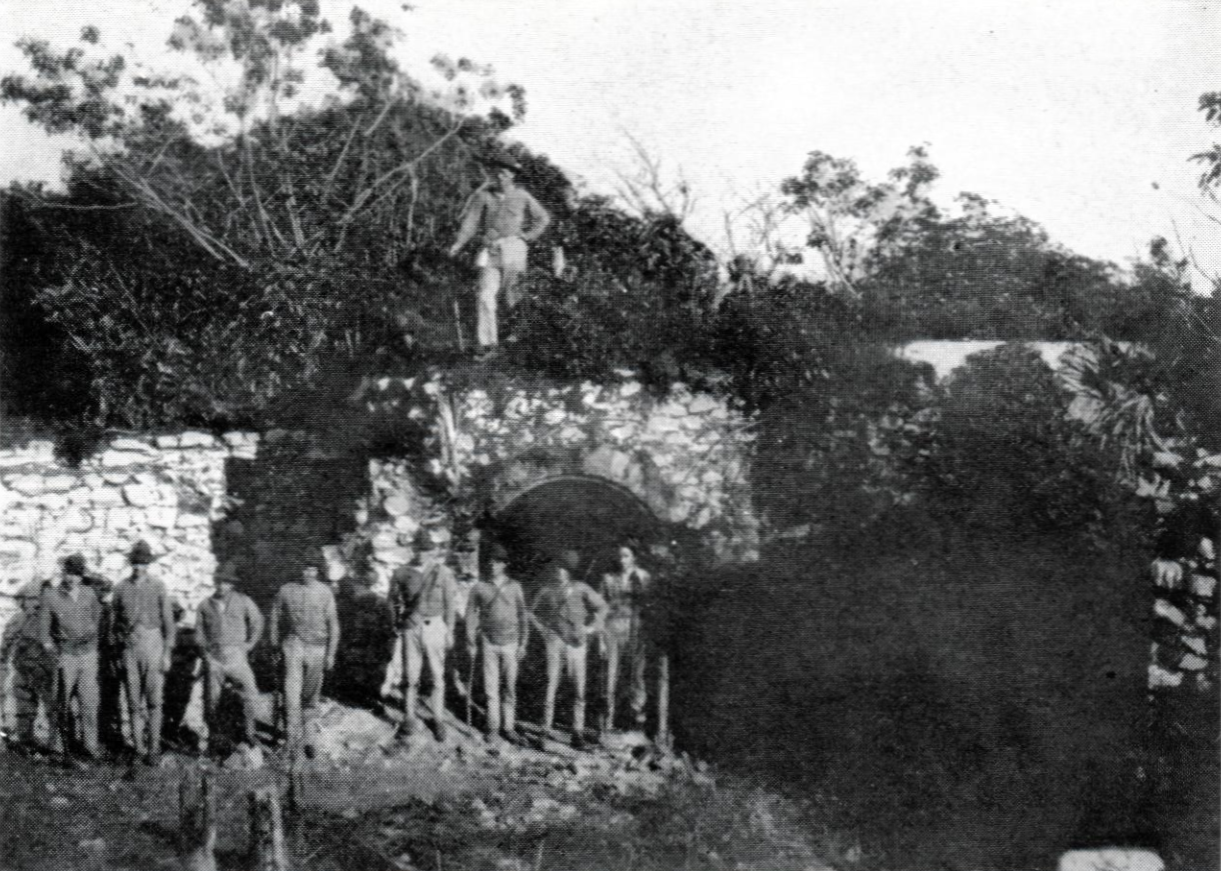
- Fort Rivière after its capture
Date	17 November 1915
Location	Fort Rivière, Saint-Raphaël, Haiti 19.480556°N 72.171111°W
Result	American victory

Belligerents
United States	(Haiti) Cacos

Commanders and leaders
Smedley Butler	(Haiti) Josaphat Jean-Joseph †

Strength
100 marines and sailors	50+ militia

Casualties and losses
None	50+ killed

The Battle of Fort Rivière was the decisive battle of the First Caco War during United States occupation of Haiti in 1915. A combined force of United States Marines and sailors defeated Cacos rebels at Fort Rivière, ending the First Caco War.

== Background ==
In 1915, United States forces landed in Haiti during a period of political instability. Cacos insurgents, quasi-military mountain tribes who served as mercenaries, routinely attacked political targets as well as Haitian citizens to sustain themselves. By October, United States Marines had trapped the Cacos in the mountains of northeastern Haiti and moved in to eradicate them. On 25 October Marines from the 15th Company, 2nd Marine Regiment, under the command of Major Smedley Butler, had dealt the Cacos a significant blow at the Battle of Fort Dipitié, and shortly thereafter took Fort Capois with heavy Cacos casualties. On 8 November, Butler's force captured Forts Selon and Berthol without resistance, leaving Fort Rivière as the final Cacos stronghold.

Fort Rivière had been built by the French in the late 18th century out of brick and stone atop Montagne Noire, at an elevation of 4,000 feet (1,200 m), approximately 20 miles (32 km) south of Cap-Haïtien. The fort, measuring approximately 200 feet (61 m) square with 25-foot-high (7.6 m) walls, was in disrepair, but due to the harsh terrain, Marine strategists considered the fort impregnable unless a regiment with artillery was sent to attack. However, Butler convinced his commanding officer, Colonel Eli K. Cole, that he could take the fort with 100 men and he assembled a task force from 5th, 13th, and 23rd Marine companies, as well as from the Marines and sailors aboard the USS Connecticut.

== Battle ==
At dusk on 16 November Butler's force began its ascent of the mountain toward the fort. At daybreak on 17 November, Butler deployed both companies from the Connecticut on the south wall: the Marines, under the command of Captain Frederick A. Barker, as well as the bluejackets, under the command of Lieutenant (junior grade) Scott D. McCaughey, whose force also included a machine gun detachment from the 23rd Marine company. Captain Chandler Campbell led the 13th Company's attack on the east wall, and Butler led Captain William W. Low's 5th Company against the west wall. A detachment of McCaughey's Connecticut sailors also covered the north wall, blocking the trail leading north. The attack commenced at 07:30, and the Marines immediately began taking fire—Butler described it as "heavy, but inaccurate"—with scant cover.

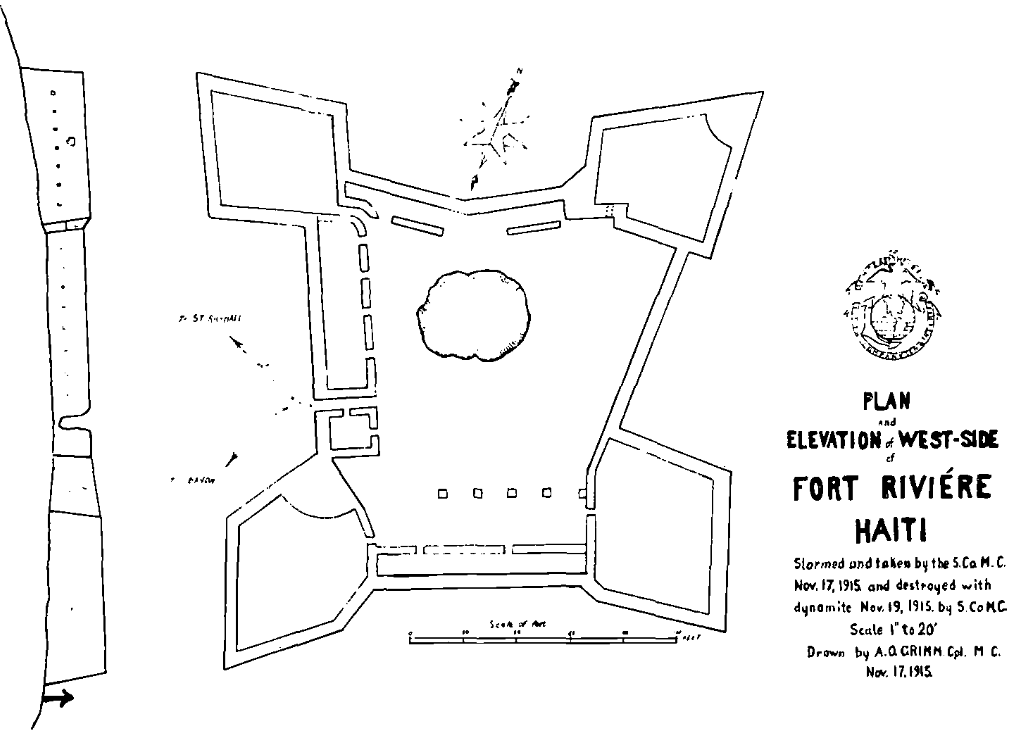
Plan of Fort Rivière, drawn on the day of the battle by Corporal Arno Grimm of the 5th Marine Company

Butler's force located a partially sealed drain 4 feet (1.2 m) wide, 3 feet (0.91 m) tall, and 15 feet (4.6 m) deep in the fort's wall, only large enough for one man to pass through at a time, which served as a Cacos entrance. Sergeant Ross Lindsey Iams and Private Samuel Gross were the first to crawl through the tunnel, (Note: In his unpublished memoirs, Vice Admiral Joel T. Boone (USN), then a lieutenant (junior grade) and the medical officer of the 13th Company, wrote that under Captain Campbell's orders, he led six Marines in breaching the fort first by climbing over the parapets of the east wall. "Our linkup with Butler [inside] raised a question as to who had entered the fort first," Boone wrote, noting that he and Butler disagreed on the matter.) followed by Butler with his .45 caliber pistol. Despite Cacos fire into the tunnel, the trio of Marines emerged unscathed and immediately began firing on the 50 surprised Cacos in the fort—Butler described them as "half naked madmen, howling and leaping"—and they were joined shortly by the rest of the 5th Company streaming through the drain. Gross dispatched a massive Cacos with his rifle just moments before he would have struck a devastating blow to Butler's head with a club.

As panic overtook the Cacos, Butler writes they "threw away their loaded guns and grabbed swords and clubs, rocks and bricks, which were no match for bullets and bayonets." After ten minutes of intense close quarters combat, the Marines had killed the entire Cacos garrison, including their commander, Josaphat Jean-Joseph, a former Haitian cabinet minister. Cacos who had escaped the fort by jumping over its parapets were cut down by the force covering the south wall.

== Aftermath ==
The American force had won an "astounding little victory" and had suffered no casualties—one man lost two teeth to a thrown rock—despite a sharp conflict. Butler writes that if the defenders "had only realized the advantage of their position, they could have shot us like rats as we crawled, one by one, out of the drain." Having delivered a massive blow to the Cacos, the Americans leveled Fort Rivière with dynamite and destroyed 60 dwellings outside the fort, thus ending the First Caco War. Butler writes that the returning Americans were greeted by Haitians roadside, who were grateful for "ridding them of the Caco terror" that had plagued the countryside. Armed resistance to the American occupation did not end, however, as Second Caco War—much bloodier than the first—erupted in 1918.

For their heroism during the Battle of Fort Rivière, Major Butler, Sergeant Iams, and Private Gross all received the Medal of Honor; the award was Butler's second, having received the first the prior year during the Battle of Veracruz.

== See also ==
- Banana Wars
