= Gray Township, Greene County, Pennsylvania =

Township in Pennsylvania, US

Coordinates: 39°56′00″N 80°22′14″W

- Township
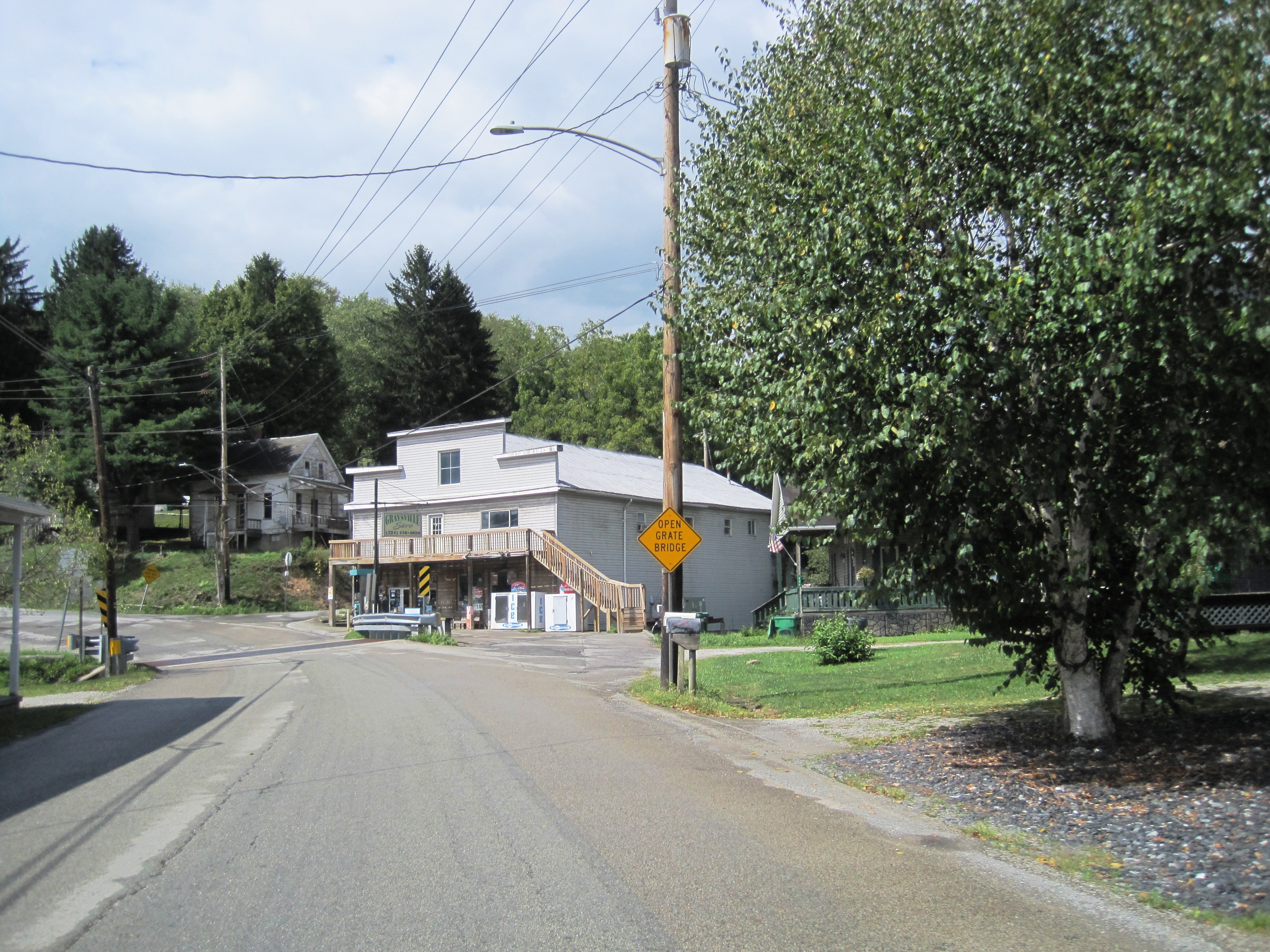
- Graysville within the township

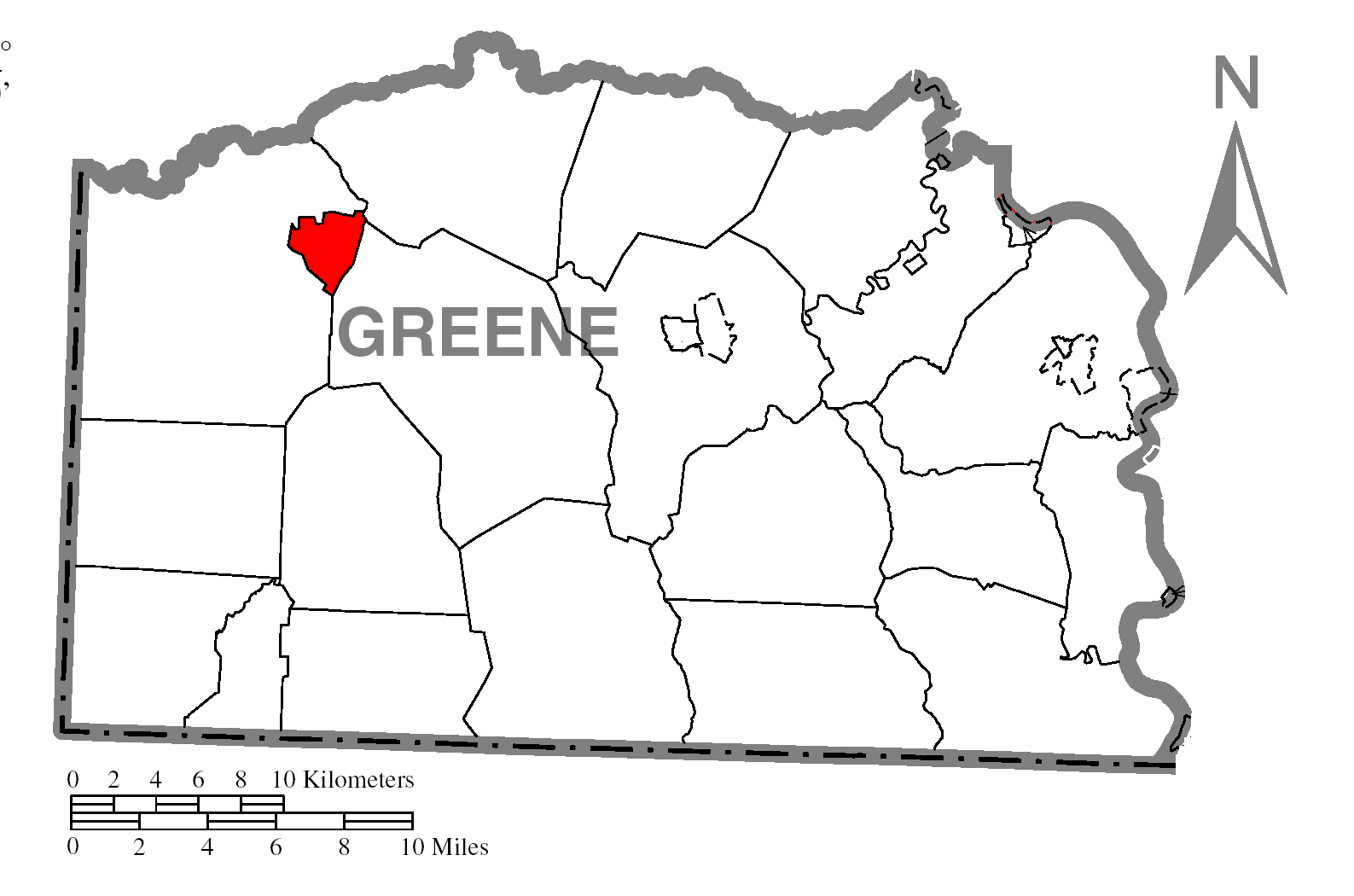
- Location of Gray Township in Greene County

- Location of Greene County in Pennsylvania
- Country: United States
- State: Pennsylvania
- County: Greene

Area
  - Total: 4.24 sq mi (10.97 km^{2})
  - Land: 4.24 sq mi (10.97 km^{2})
  - Water: 0 sq mi (0.00 km^{2})

Population (2020)
  - Total: 184 ▼
  - Estimate (2023): 177
  - Density: 50.7/sq mi (19.59/km^{2})
- Time zone: UTC-4 (EST)
  - Summer (DST): UTC-5 (EDT)
- Area code: 724
- FIPS code: 42-059-30640

Gray Township is a township in Greene County, Pennsylvania, United States. The population was 184 at the 2020 census.

== Geography ==
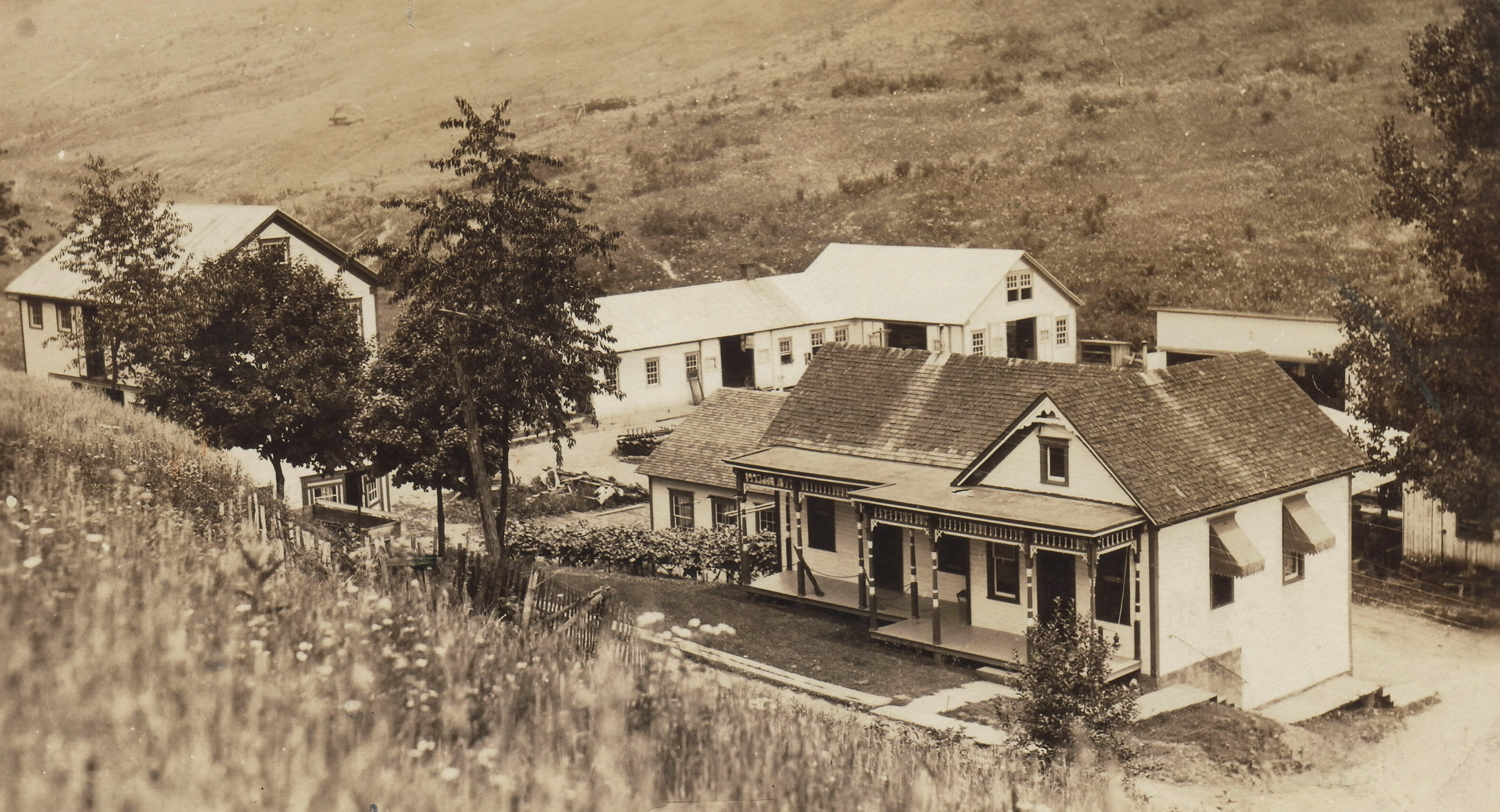
Historic photo of a gas company office at Graysville

Gray Township is in northwestern Greene County, nearly entirely in the valley of the Grays Fork of Tenmile Creek, an eastward-flowing tributary of the Monongahela River. The primary settlement in the township is Graysville, an unincorporated community near the geographic center of the township, along the Grays Fork and Pennsylvania Route 21.

According to the United States Census Bureau, the township has a total area of 4.2 square miles (11.0 km^{2}), all land.

== Demographics ==
Historical population
Census	Pop.	Note	%±
2000	236		—
2010	219		−7.2%
2020	184		−16.0%
2025 (est.)	172		−6.5%
U.S. Decennial Census

As of the census of 2000, there were 236 people, 95 households, and 74 families residing in the township. The population density was 71.5 inhabitants per square mile (27.6/km^{2}). There were 105 housing units at an average density of 31.8 per square mile (12.3/km^{2}). The racial makeup of the township was 99.15% White, and 0.85% from two or more races.

There were 95 households, out of which 30.5% had children under the age of 18 living with them, 65.3% were married couples living together, 6.3% had a female householder with no husband present, and 22.1% were non-families. 20.0% of all households were made up of individuals, and 11.6% had someone living alone who was 65 years of age or older. The average household size was 2.48 and the average family size was 2.80.

In the township the population was spread out, with 22.0% under the age of 18, 11.4% from 18 to 24, 27.1% from 25 to 44, 19.1% from 45 to 64, and 20.3% who were 65 years of age or older. The median age was 38 years. For every 100 females, there were 98.3 males. For every 100 females age 18 and over, there were 97.8 males.

The median income for a household in the township was $26,250, and the median income for a family was $30,500. Males had a median income of $33,125 versus $12,500 for females. The per capita income for the township was $13,584. About 8.8% of families and 10.3% of the population were below the poverty line, including 23.3% of those under the age of 18 and 3.5% of those 65 or over.
