= Norris City Cemetery =

Cemetery in Montgomery County, Pennsylvania, US

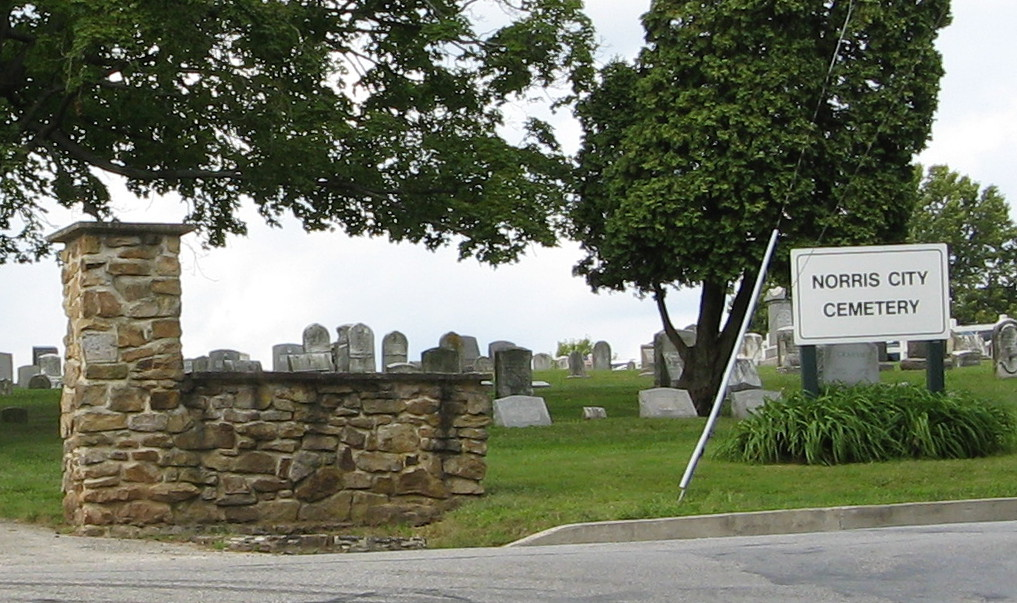
- Entrance to Norris City Cemetery
- Interactive map of Norris City Cemetery

Details
- Established: ~1860
- Location: East Norriton Township, Montgomery County, Pennsylvania
- Country: United States
- Coordinates: 40°08′26″N 75°20′06″W
- Type: Municipal, Historic
- Style: Rural
- Owned by: East Norriton Township
- No. of graves: ~1800
- No. of interments: ~2500
- Website: Norris City Cemetery
- Find a Grave: Norris City Cemetery

Norris City Cemetery is located at the corner of Stanbridge Street and Norris City Avenue in East Norriton Township, Montgomery County, Pennsylvania. Founded in the early 1860s, the cemetery came under township ownership in the late 1980s after falling into disrepair, and is now maintained as part of East Norriton's parks system.

Its development was part of the so-called Rural Cemetery Movement, and as such was nonsectarian and was not overseen by any specific municipality. Most graves were populated between 1880 and 1920, but the cemetery has remained active since. The cemetery is most ordinary: there are few elaborate graves and only one notable person buried here, Ephraim Acker (1827–1903), a US Congress Representative.
