= Grande Rivière du Nord =

Coordinates: 19°45′07″N 72°07′0″W

Grande Rivière du Nord (French pronunciation: [ɡʁɑ̃ ʁivjɛʁ dy nɔʁ]) is a small coastal river that has its mouth in the Atlantic Ocean located in the Nord department of Haiti.

== Geography ==
This river has its source in the Massif du Nord, which runs through the town of Grande-Rivière-du-Nord.

== Hydrology ==
The watershed of the Great North River is 640 km^{2}, the average rate or modulus of 5.4 m^{3} ⋅ / s and the flow coefficient of 20.5%.
