= William Robert Button =

United States Marine Corps Medal of Honor recipient

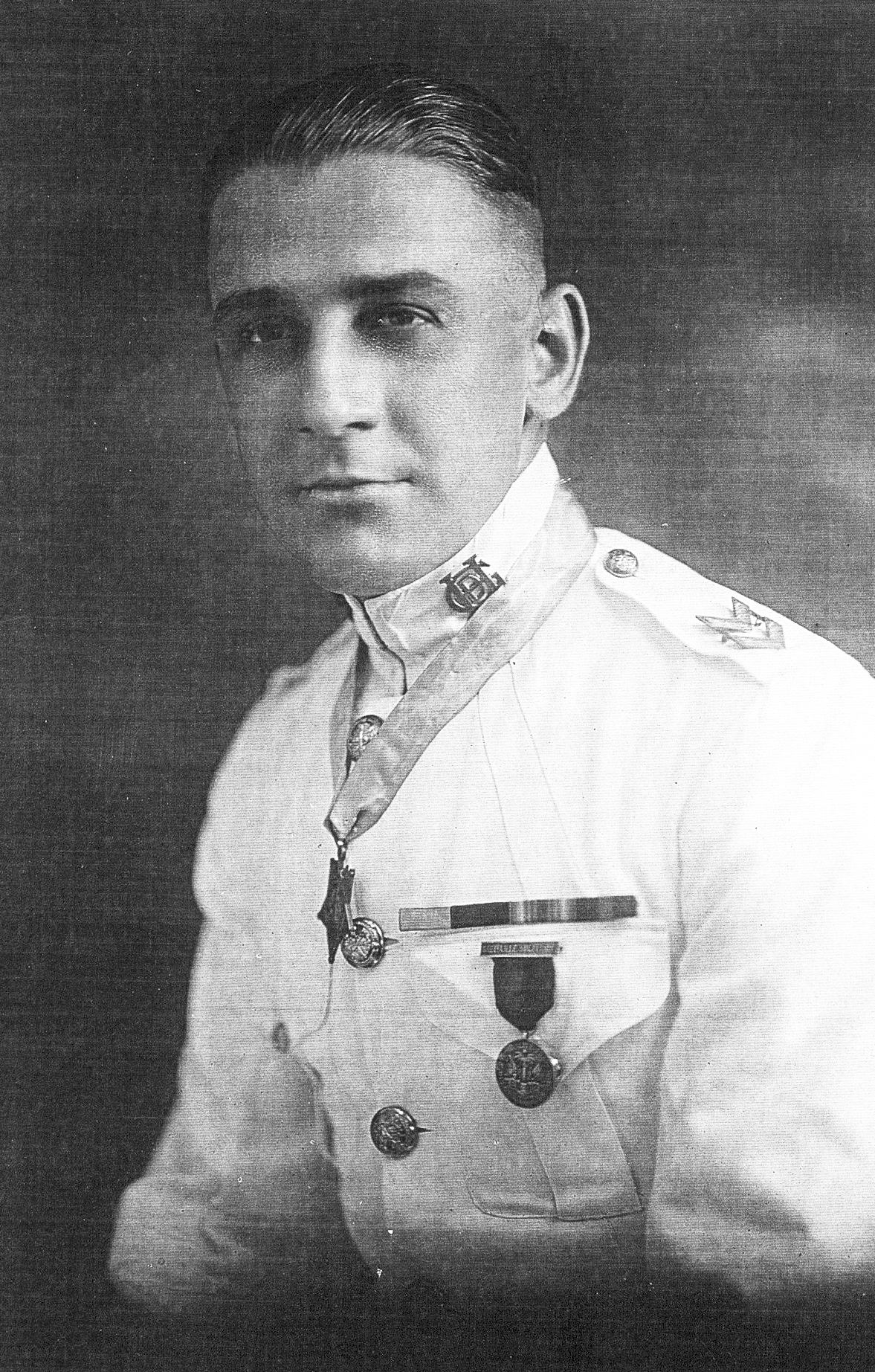
- Button wearing his Medal of Honor, c. 1920
- Born: December 3, 1895; St. Louis, Missouri, U.S.
- Died: April 15, 1921 (aged 25); Cap-Haïtien, Haiti
- Burial place: Valhalla Cemetery; Midland Township, Missouri, U.S.
- Military career
- Allegiance: United States
- Branch: United States Marine Corps
- Service years: 1917–1921
- Rank: Sergeant
- Unit: 1st Provisional Marine Brigade
- Conflicts: United States occupation of Haiti; Second Caco War
- Awards: Medal of Honor

William Robert Button (December 3, 1895 – April 15, 1921) was a United States Marine who was awarded the Medal of Honor for his actions in the assassination of Haitian nationalist leader Charlemagne Péralte in 1919 during the United States occupation of Haiti.

== Career ==
Button was born December 3, 1895, in St. Louis, Missouri. By October 1919, he was serving as a corporal in the United States Marine Corps and was stationed in Haiti during its occupation by the United States. Button also held the rank of first lieutenant in the Gendarmerie of Haiti, the country's internal security force consisting mostly of native troops.

One of the key figures in the Haitian resistance to the occupation was Charlemagne Péralte, who commanded some 5,000 Cacos rebels. After an unsuccessful raid on Port-au-Prince on October 6, 1919, Péralte was planning another attack on the Gendarmerie in Grande-Rivière-du-Nord several weeks later. Marine Corps Sergeant Herman H. Hanneken (who held the rank of captain in the Gendarmerie) formulated a plan to assassinate Péralte. For a fee, former Grande-Rivière-du-Nord police chief Jean-Baptiste Conzé told the Marines that Péralte was garrisoned at Fort Capois in the mountains near Sainte-Suzanne. A staged attack by Hanneken on Conzé in Grande-Rivière-du-Nord, "won" by Conzé, established the Haitian informer's credibility with Péralte.

On the evening of October 31, 1919, Hannekin and Button dressed in Cacos clothing and blackened their skin with cork ash, blending into a band of disguised Gendarmes led by Conzé. They successfully passed through six Cacos outposts, with Hannekin's fluency in Haitian Creole bolstering the ruse, though Button's accent and Browning Automatic Rifle, recognized by Cacos scouts as a "white man's gun," threatened their cover. Reaching Péralte's camp, Conzé provided the correct password for entry, and spotting Péralte, Hannekin fatally shot him twice in the chest with his .45 caliber pistol, while Button used his rifle to cut down Péralte's bodyguards. After repelling repeated Cacos attacks throughout the night, the Marines strapped Péralte's corpse to a mule and made their way back to Grande-Rivière-du-Nord.

== Aftermath and death ==
For their roles in the daring assassination, both Hanneken and Button were awarded the Medal of Honor, which was presented by General John A. Lejeune, commandant of the Marine Corps, at a ceremony in Washington, DC, on July 1, 1920. They also received the Haitiain Médaille Militaire, awarded by President Philippe Sudré Dartiguenave. Afterward, Button took a short furlough back to St. Louis before returning to Haiti. Soon after, he was diagnosed with pernicious malaria and died of the disease at a military hospital in Cap-Haïtien on April 15, 1921, at the age of 25. He was buried in Valhalla Cemetery near St. Louis. Button's Marine Corps comrades in the Gendarmerie raised funds for a bronze memorial tablet at his gravesite and yearly placement of flowers on Memorial Day.

== Medal of Honor Citation ==
Rank and organization: Corporal, U.S. Marine Corps.
Entered service at: St. Louis, Mo.
Born: 3 December 1895, St. Louis, Mo.
G.O. No.: 536, 10 June 1920.

Citation:

For extraordinary heroism and conspicuous gallantry and intrepidity in actual conflict with the enemy near Grande Riviere, Republic of Haiti, on the night of 31 October–1 November 1919, resulting in the death of Charlemagne Peralte, the supreme bandit chief in the Republic of Haiti, and the killing, capture and dispersal of about 1,200 of his outlaw followers. Cpl. William R. Button not only distinguished himself by his excellent judgment and leadership but also unhesitatingly exposed himself to great personal danger when the slightest error would have forfeited not only his life but the lives of the detachments of Gendarmerie under his command. The successful termination of his mission will undoubtedly prove of untold value to the Republic of Haiti.

A United States Naval Ship, the USNS Sgt. William R. Button entered service in 1986 and named in Button's honor.

== See also ==
- List of Medal of Honor recipients
