= Har Nebo Cemetery =

Jewish cemetery in Philadelphia County, Pennsylvania

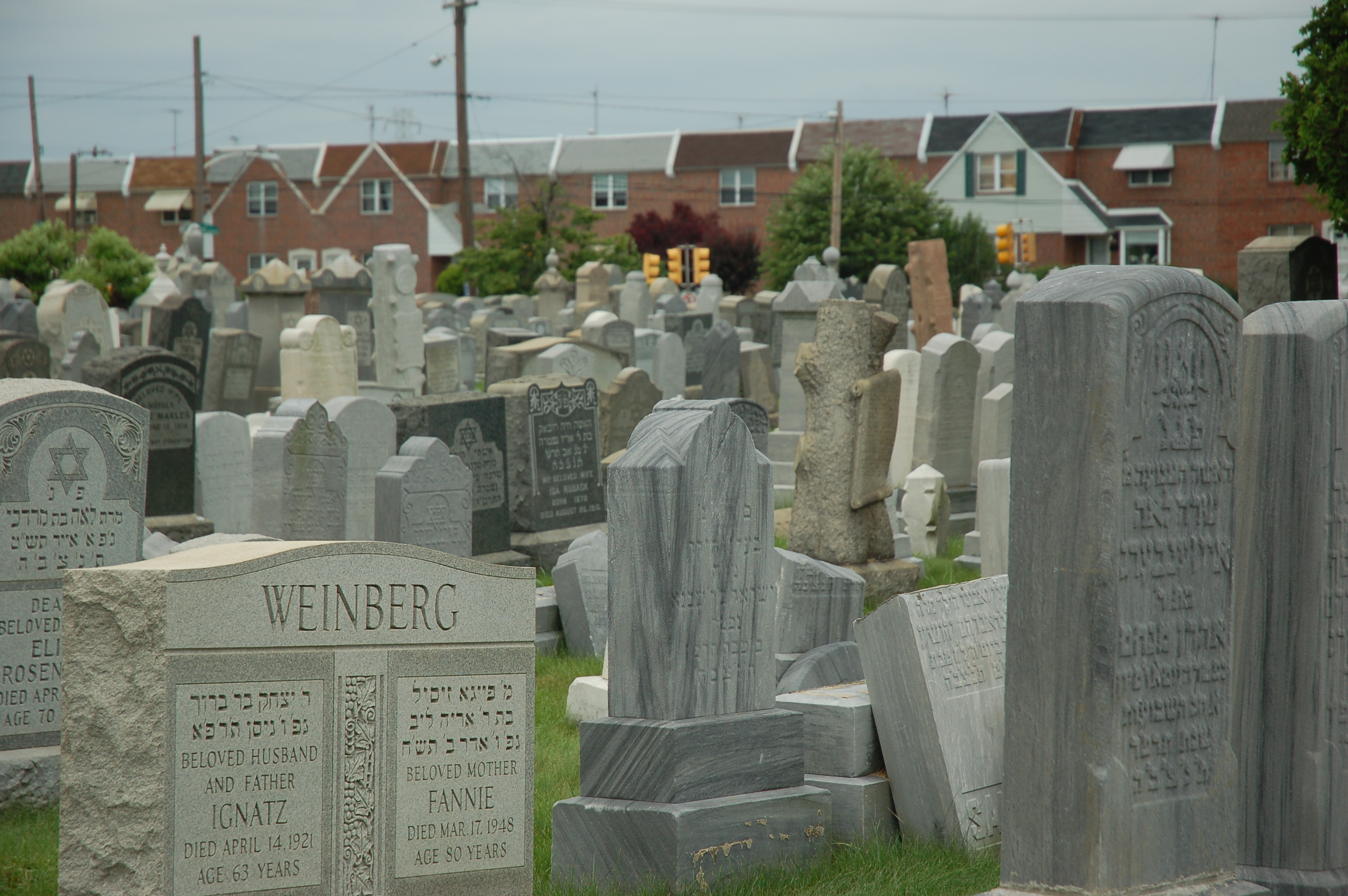

Details
- Established: 1890
- Location: 6061 Oxford Avenue; Philadelphia, Pennsylvania
- Country: United States
- Coordinates: 40°02′21″N 75°05′12″W
- Type: private
- Size: 16 acres (65,000 m^{2})
- No. of graves: >35,000
- Find a Grave: Har Nebo Cemetery

Har Nebo Cemetery is a Jewish cemetery in the Oxford Circle neighborhood of Philadelphia, Pennsylvania. Established in 1890, it is the oldest privately owned Jewish cemetery in Philadelphia. It is named for Mount Nebo, a Moabite mountain mentioned as the place where Moses died in the Hebrew Bible on the other side the Jordan River.

== History ==
The organization was established in 1890 by Isaac Levy as the Har Nebo Cemetery Company. That October, the company was granted permission for the construction of the physical cemetery, located in the 23rd Ward of Philadelphia (rural Frankford). It was built on land belonging to deceased David Williams. Burials date back as far as 1892. In 1906, the boundaries of the cemetery were extended further into undeveloped sections of the 35th Ward. This was due to an outbreak of Smallpox in the area. In 1924, the widening of Devereaux Avenue caused territory losses for the cemetery.

In 1955, 32 stones were damaged when suspected juvenile delinquents went on a spree of valdalism across the cemetery. In 1987, a 17-year-old girl was raped at knifepoint on the property.

== Modern issues ==
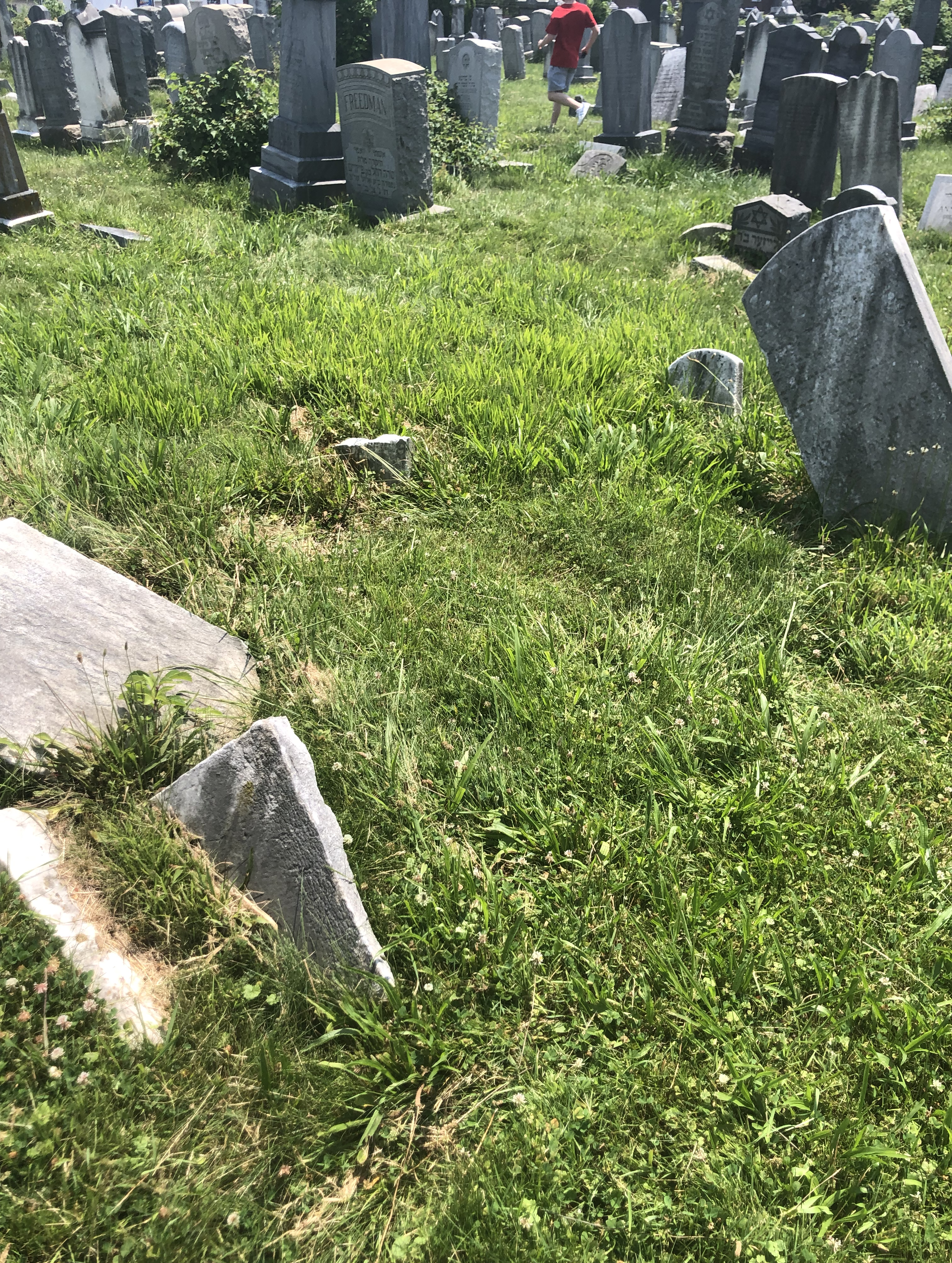
A photograph depicting the sunken and overturned gravestones in Har Nebo, June 2022

Har Nebo Cemetery is recognized as a cemetery that is, for the most part, in severe disrepair. Many gravestones are knocked over, much of the ground is unkempt, and the cemetery is often inaccessible. A restoration has been undertaken since 2021 by Friends of Jewish Cemeteries to take ownership of and restore the cemetery to its previous condition.

The cemetery also administers Mount Carmel Cemetery.

== Notable interments ==
- David Cohen, Philadelphia City Councilman
- Harry Gold (1910–1972), atomic spy
- Eddie Gottlieb (1898–1979), American professional basketball coach and team owner
- Samuel Gross (1891–1934), Medal of Honor recipient
- Stan Hochman (1928–2015), sportswriter
- Adolph Hirschberg (1889–1943, American labor leader
