= Edmond Polynice =

Haitian military and political figure

Edmond Sylvestre Polynice
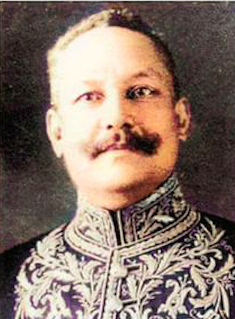

Provisional President of Haiti
- In office January 27, 1914 – February 8, 1914
- Preceded by: Michel Oreste
- Succeeded by: Oreste Zamor

Provisional President of Haiti
- In office October 29, 1914 – November 6, 1914
- Preceded by: Oreste Zamor
- Succeeded by: Joseph Davilmar Théodore

Member of the Revolutionary Committee of Haiti
- In office July 28, 1915 – August 11, 1915

Personal details
- Born: 21 January 1855
- Died: 1915 (aged 59–60)

Edmond Sylvestre Polynice (French pronunciation: [ɛdmɔ̃ silvɛstʁ pɔlinis]; 21 January 1855 – 1915) was a Haitian military and political figure who served as interim President of Haiti twice in 1914, both times acting as head of a Committee of Public Safety. Previously, Polynice had been a member of the May 1902 committee headed by Pierre Théoma Boisrond-Canal.

In the 1910s, Haiti experienced a severe political crisis. These turbulent years were marked by successive ephemeral governments and Cacos revolts. After the deaths of generals Cincinnatus Leconte and Tancrède Auguste, civilian Michel Oreste was elected president in 1913. He was forced to resign on January 27, 1914, because of an insurrectional coup led by the Zamor's cacos. Edmond Polynice temporarily assumed power in Haiti, presiding over a civil-military committee responsible for maintaining political order. Immediately after Michel Oreste's fall, American, British, German and French marines landed to protect their interests - General Polynice called this a "national humiliation". Polynice transferred power to Oreste Zamor on February 8, after the National Assembly elected him as president. After Zamor's fall in the same year, General Polynice took power again with a provisional committee, ruling from October 29 to November 6, transferring the presidency to Joseph Davilmar Théodore.

Edmond Polynice, together with Charles de Delva and Ermane Robin, formed a revolutionary plot against President Vilbrun Guillaume Sam which culminated in the early hours of July 27, in an attack on the National Palace. Cornered, President Sam took refuge in the French Legation. In retaliation, Sam's loyal police chief, Charles Oscar Etienne, ordered the execution of political prisoners. Polynice, who lost three sons during the executions, appeared in person at the Dominican Legation, finding Charles Oscar Étienne and shot him dead. Around the same time, a mob invaded the French Legation and killed Sam.

After the murder of Vilbrun Sam, Polynice became a member of the Revolutionary Committee (28 July to 11 August 1915, led by Charles de Delva). In fact, the committee only controlled the country's capital, Port-au-Prince, and its activities took place against the backdrop of the American invasion of Haiti and the rebellion of revolutionary Rosalvo Bobo. Polynice was part of a special commission that negotiated with Bobo. In August, the committee transferred power to Philippe Dartiguenave.
