= Revolutionary Committee (Haiti) =

Council governing Hati in 1915

President of Haiti
- In office 28 July 1915 – 11 August 1915
- Leader: Charles de Delva
- Preceded by: Vilbrun Guillaume Sam
- Succeeded by: Philippe Sudré Dartiguenave

The Revolutionary Committee (French: Comité Révolutionnaire, pronounced [kɔmite ʁevɔlysjɔnɛʁ]; Haitian Creole: Komite Revolisyonè) was a governmental council that governed Haiti from July 28 to August 11, 1915. The committee took power after the death of Vilbrun Guillaume Sam and de facto controlled the country's capital, Port-au-Prince, with its activities having as its background the American invasion of Haiti and the rebellion of Rosalvo Bobo. Committee was composed of: Charles de Delva, Charles Zamor, Edmond Polynice, Léon Nau, Ermane Robin, Eribert Saint-Vil Nöel and Samson Monpoint.

== History ==
In the context of a revolution led by Rosalvo Bobo against President Sam, a revolutionary plot attacked the national palace on the night of 26 to 27 July. The plot was carried out by generals Charles de Delva, Ermane Robin and Edmond Polynice. Sam's police chief Charles Oscar Etienne, in retaliation, ordered the executions of the political prisoners. When the population learned of the massacre, a mob went to the places where Sam and Oscar Étienne were and took revenge on them with a lynching.

A Revolutionary Committee was formed in Port-au-Prince, led by Charles de Delva and made up of insurrection leaders. Committee members were closely linked with July events: Delva, started the insurrection; Charles lost his brother Oreste Zamor and Polynice his sons, respectively, in the massacre of political prisoners perpetrated by Sam's loyal forces. The committee, in practice, wanted to ensure Rosalvo Bobo's rise to power. One of the incidents of the short-lived government of Port-au-Prince was the arrest of Senator Joseph Dessources, motivated by his political agitation against the Revolutionary Committee.

At the same time, the United States carried out an intervention in Haiti with its troops landing and gradually occupying the country. In early August, the Committee held peace negotiations with the revolutionary Bobo in a special committee. Faced with Bobo's possible defeat, the Committee attempted to dissolve Congress on August 11 to prevent the election of a pro-American president. In reaction to this maneuver, General William Banks Caperton disbanded the Revolutionary Committee. The next day, Philippe Sudré Dartiguenave was elected under American supervision and Bobo chose exile in the following days.
