= South Carolina-class battleship =

Dreadnought battleship class of the United States Navy

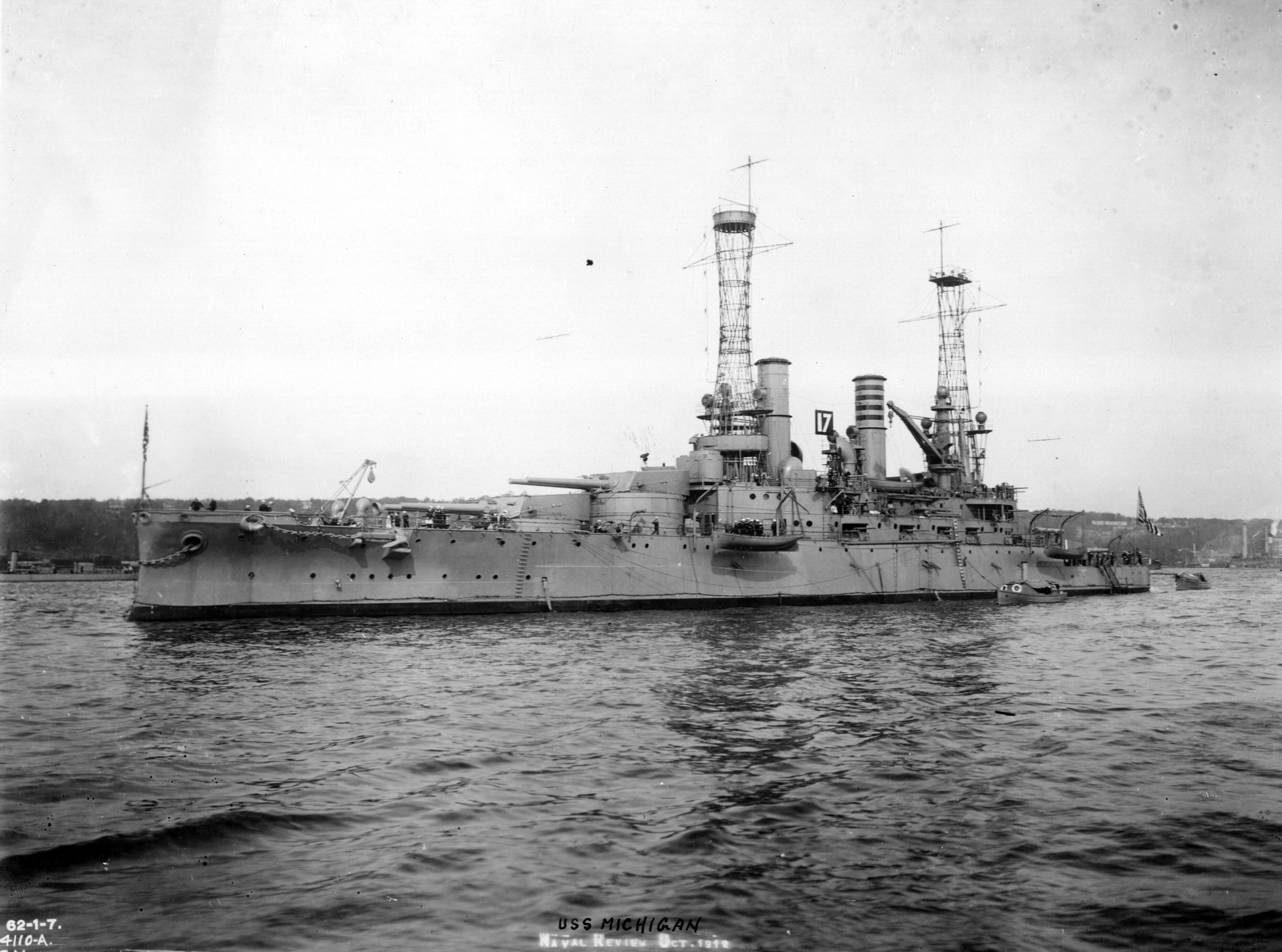
- Michigan at a naval review off New York City, October 1912

Class overview
- Name: South Carolina-class battleship
- Builders: William Cramp & Sons; New York Shipbuilding Corporation
- Operators: United States Navy
- Preceded by: Mississippi class
- Succeeded by: Delaware class
- In service: 1910–1922
- Planned: 2
- Completed: 2
- Scrapped: 2

General characteristics
- Type: Dreadnought battleship
- Displacement: 16,000 long tons (16,300 t) (design); 17,617 long tons (17,900 t) (full load)
- Length: 452 ft 9 in (138.00 m) (overall); 450 ft 0 in (137.16 m) (waterline)
- Beam: 80 ft 3 in (24.46 m)
- Draft: 24 ft 6 in (7.47 m)
- Installed power: 4 × Curtis direct-current turbogenerators (200 kW (270 hp)); 12 × coal-fired superheating Babcock & Wilcox water-tube boilers; 16,500 ihp (12,300 kW)
- Propulsion: Vertical triple expansion steam engines; 2 × screws
- Speed: 18.5 kn (21.3 mph; 34.3 km/h)
- Range: 6,950 nmi (8,000 mi; 12,870 km) at 10 kn (12 mph; 19 km/h)
- Complement: 51 officers and 881 enlisted men
- Armament: 8 × 12 in (305 mm)/45 caliber Mark 5 guns (Note: In US Navy gun nomenclature, the "/45 caliber" denotes the length of the gun. In this case, the /45 gun is 45 caliber, meaning that the gun barrel is 45 times as long as it is in diameter.); 22 × 3 in (76 mm)/50 caliber guns; 2 × 3-pounder 47 mm (1.85 in)/40 caliber guns; 8 × 1-pounder 37 mm (1.46 in) guns; 2 × 21 in (533 mm) torpedo tubes (submerged)
- Armor: Belt: 12–8 in (305–203 mm); Casemates: 10–8 in (254–203 mm); Barbettes: 10–8 in (254–203 mm); Turrets: Face: 12 in (305 mm); Side: 8 in (203 mm); Roof: 2.5 in (64 mm); Decks: 2.5–1 in (64–25 mm); Conning tower: 12–2 in (305–51 mm)

Two South Carolina-class battleships, also known as the Michigan class, (Note: Michigan (BB-27) was laid down, launched, and commissioned first, but South Carolina (BB-26) had a lower hull number.) were built for the United States Navy in the early twentieth century. Named South Carolina and Michigan, they were the first American dreadnoughts—powerful warships whose capabilities far outstripped those of the world's older battleships.

At the turn of the twentieth century, the prevailing theory of naval combat was that battles would continue to be fought at relatively close range using many small, fast-firing guns. As such, each of the ships in the United States' previous Connecticut-class battleships carried many medium-sized weapons alongside four large guns. This paradigm was soon to be subverted, as American naval theorists proposed that a ship mounting a homogeneous battery of large guns would be more effective in battle.

As these ideas began to enjoy wider acceptance, the US Congress authorized the country's navy to construct two small 16,000-long-ton (16,300 t) battleships. This displacement was roughly the same size as the Connecticut class and at least 2,000 long tons (2,000 t) smaller than foreign equivalents. A solution was found in an ambitious design drawn up by Rear Admiral Washington L. Capps, the chief of the navy's Bureau of Construction and Repair; it traded speed for heavy armament and relatively thick armor, both of which were favored by naval theorists of the time.

With their superfiring main armament, press accounts billed South Carolina and Michigan, along with the British HMS Dreadnought, as heralding a new epoch in warship design. All three, however, were soon surpassed by ever-larger and stronger super-dreadnoughts. The class's low top speed of about 18.5 knots (21.3 mph; 34.3 km/h), as compared to the 21-knot (24 mph; 39 km/h) standard of later American battleships, relegated them to serving with older, obsolete battleships during the First World War. After the end of the conflict and the signing of the Washington Naval Treaty, both South Carolinas were scrapped.

== Background ==
In 1901, the US Navy's battleship designs reflected the prevailing theory of naval combat: battles would begin at long distances before closing the range for knockout blows. In the latter stage, shorter-range, faster-firing guns would prove most useful. Following this philosophy, the premier battleship class then under construction—the Connecticut class—carried four large 12-inch (305 mm), eight 8-inch (203 mm), and twelve 7-inch (178 mm) guns, an armament slightly heavier than typical foreign battleships of the time.

The Naval Institute's Proceedings magazine devoted space in two of its 1902 issues to possible improvements in battleship design. The first article was authored by Lieutenant Matt H. Signor, who argued for a ship with 13-inch (330 mm) and 10-inch (254 mm)/40 caliber guns in four triple turrets. The secondary battery would be composed of 5-inch (127 mm)/60 guns. This paper provoked enough thought that Proceedings published comments on the story from Captain William M. Folger, Professor P. R. Alger, and naval constructor David W. Taylor—the latter an up-and-coming officer and future head of the Bureau of Construction and Repair (C&R). These comments expressed doubt that the proposed vessel could be codified into a feasible design, but they praised his thoughts as a step in the right direction. Alger believed that Signor was on the right track in suggesting larger armament, though he thought that triple turrets would be unworkable and eight 12-inch guns in four twin turrets would be a much more realistic arrangement. With this, naval historian Norman Friedman believes that Alger made one of the "earliest serious proposals for a homogeneous big-gun battery."

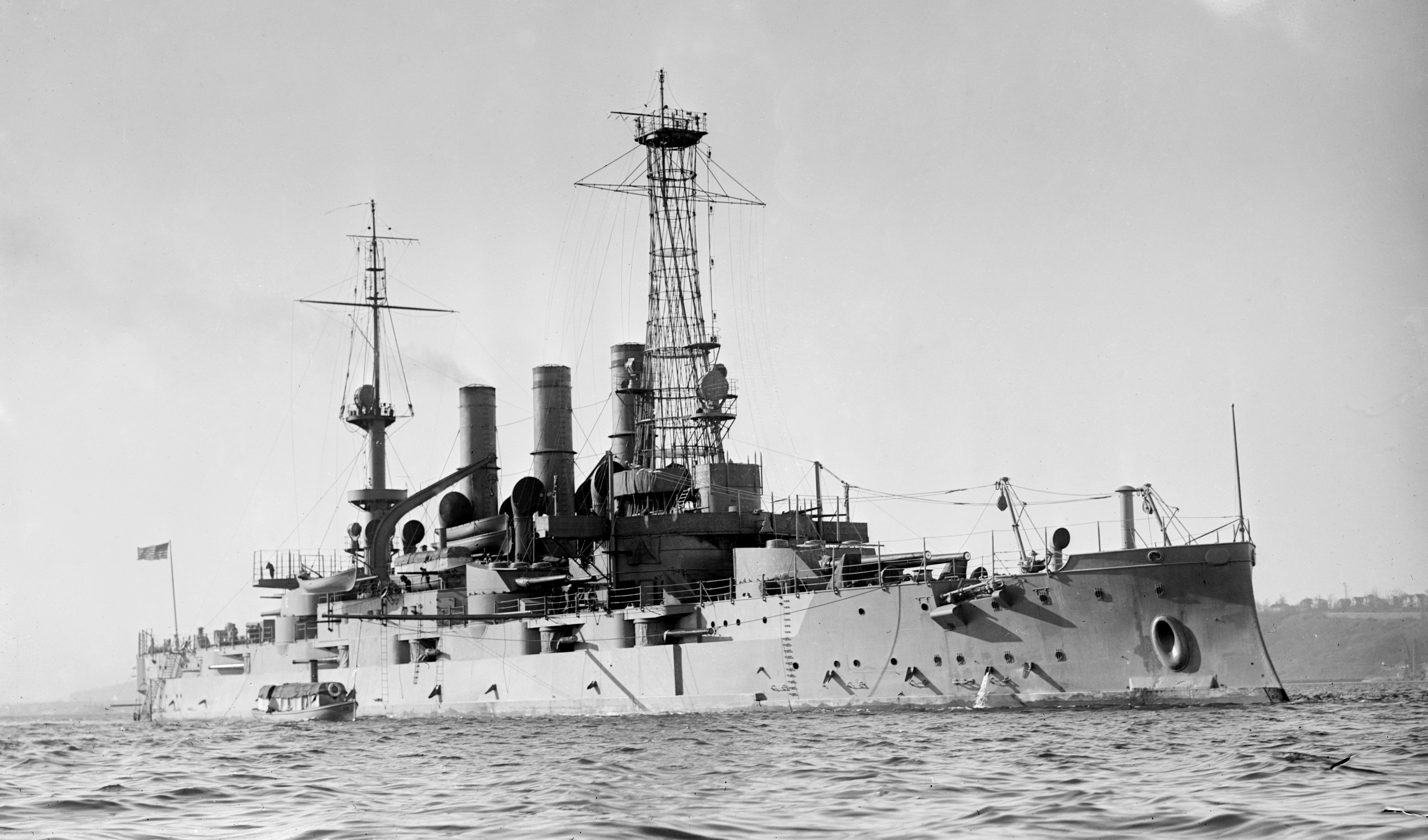
The South Carolina design began in the United States' previous pre-dreadnought battleships, such as the preceding Connecticut class (New Hampshire pictured)

The suggestion leading directly to the South Carolina class came from Homer Poundstone, a Lieutenant Commander in the Navy, who became the principal proponent of an American all-big-gun design. In a December 1902 paper written for President Theodore Roosevelt, he argued for greatly increasing the size of current battleships, although he also supported retaining mixed main batteries. (Note: Roosevelt thought that the letter was "excellent", though he was not sure that he could get Congress to adopt a similar view.) However, by the March and June 1903 editions of Proceedings, Poundstone began advocating for an all-big-gun arrangement, featuring twelve 11-inch (279 mm) guns mounted on a 19,330 long tons (19,640 t) ship. In October of the same year, the Italian naval architect Vittorio Cuniberti presented a similar idea in an article for Jane's Fighting Ships entitled "An Ideal Battleship for the British Navy". He argued in favor of a ship with twelve 12-inch guns on a slightly larger displacement than the battleships in service at the time, 17,000 long tons (17,000 t). He believed that the higher weight would allow 12 inches of armor and machinery capable of propelling the ship at 24 kn (44 km/h; 28 mph). Poundstone used what he believed to be the great popularity for this idea among Europeans to justify the all-big-gun design.

In 1903, Poundstone's designs began receiving attention from American naval authorities. After being refined by Washington Irving Chambers, Poundstone's work was brought to the Naval War College, where it was tested in war games during the 1903 Newport Conference. The results indicated that a theoretical battleship that dispensed with the intermediate 8- and 7-inch armament and was armed with only twelve 11- or 12-inch guns, all able to fire on a single broadside, was worth three of the battleships then in service. According to the men who conducted the tests, the main reasoning for the finding was that the measure of effective gun ranges was directly related to the maximum length of an enemy's torpedo range. At this time, the latter was roughly 3,000 yd (2,700 m); at that distance, the 7- and 8-inch guns common to American intermediate batteries would not be able to penetrate the armor of enemy battleships. Worse still, it was certain that—as the United States was developing a 4,000 yd (3,700 m) torpedo—gun range would have to rise in the near future, making the intermediate guns even less useful. However, a homogeneous main battery of 11- or 12-inch guns would be able to penetrate the armor and have sufficient explosive power to disable an enemy capital ship, and adding as many 3-inch (76 mm) guns as possible would provide a strong defense against torpedo-carrying but unarmored destroyers. (Note: As it turned out, events in the Russo-Japanese War soon showed that naval battles could be fought at even greater distances.)

== Design ==
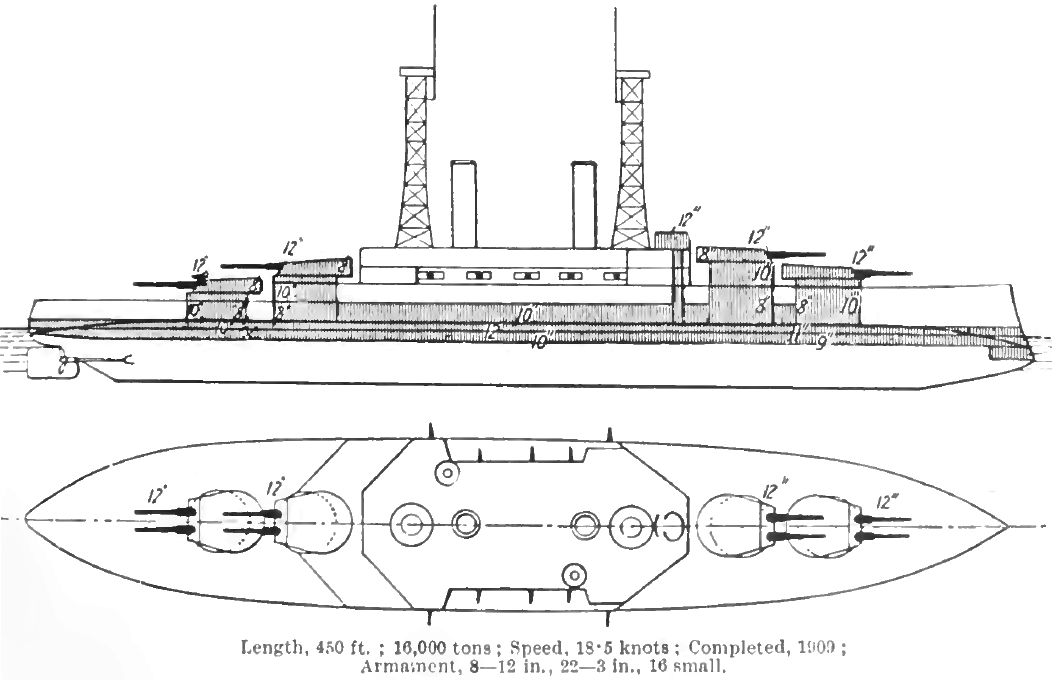
Line drawing of a South Carolina-class battleship

Faced with this evidence, the General Board sent a formal request in October 1903 to C&R, asking it to draw up plans for a battleship including these characteristics. No progress had been made by 26 January 1904, when the General Board asked C&R for a design including four 12-inch guns, eight 10-inch or larger guns, and no intermediate armament beyond 3-inch anti-destroyer guns. The move to only 10-inch weaponry was the result of doubt among naval authorities that heavier guns could physically be mounted on a ship's broadside. No action was taken on this request until September, when C&R began planning a ship with four 12-inch guns in dual turrets along with eight dual 10-inch or four single 12-inch guns.

Meanwhile, the Naval War College played three battleship designs against each other at its 1904 Newport Conference: the ships that were built following the 1903 conference; the new C&R design from September; and the latest battleships under construction, the Connecticut class. The 7- and 8-inch guns, and even the 10-inch guns, were demonstrated again to be unsatisfactory; even when hitting a battleship at the ideal angle of 90° to its belt, they failed to pierce beyond 12 inches of Krupp armor—not enough to counter enemy capital ships. Speed calculations were also performed which demonstrated that even a 3 kn (5.6 km/h; 3.5 mph) advantage over an enemy fleet would be inconsequential in the final outcome of almost all naval battles because the slower ships could stay within range by turning on a tighter radius.

Within the naval bureaus, however, there was still much resistance. In mid-to-late 1904, Poundstone continued to lobby the General Board while C&R protested that the final determinant in a naval battle would be the light guns—and in any case such a large uniform battery was not feasible. Poundstone replied with a design of his own creation, which he called USS Possible and fit twelve 11-inch guns on a ship that displaced 19,330 long tons. With support from Lieutenant Commander William Sims, who was able to cite the increasingly accurate long-gunnery of the Navy, and interest shown in the project by President Roosevelt, the bureaucratic stalling ended.

On 3 March 1905, Congress passed a bill that authorized the Navy to construct two new battleships to be named after the states of South Carolina and Michigan. The maximum tonnage limit was set at 16,000 long tons, the same weight as the mixed-battery Connecticut class of two years prior, in an attempt to stem the rising displacement—and accompanying costs—of the Navy's new capital ships. The provision was met with a mixed reception from naval designers. Some, including retired Admiral of the Navy George Dewey, thought the limit should have been set at the minimum standard of foreign battleships, or around 18,000 long tons (18,000 t). Others believed adding a significant amount of speed or firepower—something one would expect with an increase in tonnage—would require much more than 18,000 tons, and argued that the increase in size would buy nothing more than an increased target profile.

Early in [the twentieth century], several navies simultaneously decided to shift to a main battery composed entirely of the heaviest guns. The first and most famous product of this innovation was HMS Dreadnought, which gave her name to a generation of all-big-gun ships. Parallel to but independent of her conception was the American South Carolina, in many ways equally revolutionary. She introduced a superfiring main battery, a design economy which gave her a better-protected broadside equal to that of her British contemporary on about 3000 tons less displacement.

— Norman Friedman, US Battleships: An Illustrated Design History (Annapolis, MD: Naval Institute Press, 1985), 51.

The Constructor of the Navy, Rear Admiral Washington L. Capps, devised an ambitious design that packed powerful armament and thick armor onto the small hull. He believed that future naval battles would involve fleets rather than single-ship actions, and so while the wing turrets so common in European designs were useful in the latter role for putting a maximum amount of firepower in any given direction, they were less so when operating as part of a line of battle. From this, Capps theorized that the principal concern of battleships was how much shell weight they could fire per broadside. The arrangement of superfiring turrets placed on the centerline would allow the hull to be as short as possible while still having the most powerful broadside possible. A ship with its main battery placed along the center of the ship can focus the same amount of fire to port (left) or starboard (right) during a broadside. In contrast, wing turrets had significant shortcomings: their location on either side of a ship's superstructure led to smaller total broadsides, and the extreme weight placed on the sides of the ships led to torsional stress and rolling inertia. (Note: It is difficult to pinpoint an exact date as to when the superfiring idea was adopted. There were many all-big-gun plans, but only an index of them survives. Friedman speculates that the superfiring arrangement may have been accepted by the various bureaus by April 1905, giving as evidence a memo from Capps to the Bureau of Engineering asking for smaller engineering spaces in order "to increase the main battery." The design as a whole was finalized on 26 June 1905, though it took until mid-1906 to mail it to shipyards to begin the bidding process.)

As the additional main battery turrets with their associated magazines used a great amount of space within each already-limited ship, Capps was forced to economize in other ways to stay within the tonnage limit. Machinery had to be built smaller than normal to fit in the space between the fore and aft magazines, both of which were larger than usual. Boiler rooms were moved inboard to make room for torpedo protection. The biggest drawback was in propulsion: there was no room for engines that could provide the same amount of power as on previous battleships. Capps suggested cutting down the number of boilers by one-third to make room; it may have been at this point that he considered turbine propulsion. All the Bureau of Engineering could offer in response was more compact boiler rooms by eliminating centerline bulkheads.

The designers were running into the problem that Friedman calls the "squeeze": the essential elements of a battleship (armament, propulsion machinery, and armor) typically added up to about sixty percent of their design displacement. Favoring one of these factors, what he called the "three primary military qualities," would force the designers to accept compromises in one or both of the others. In the end, they chose armament and armor over speed; as a result, the South Carolina class' top speed was lower than all future US battleships.

== Specifications ==
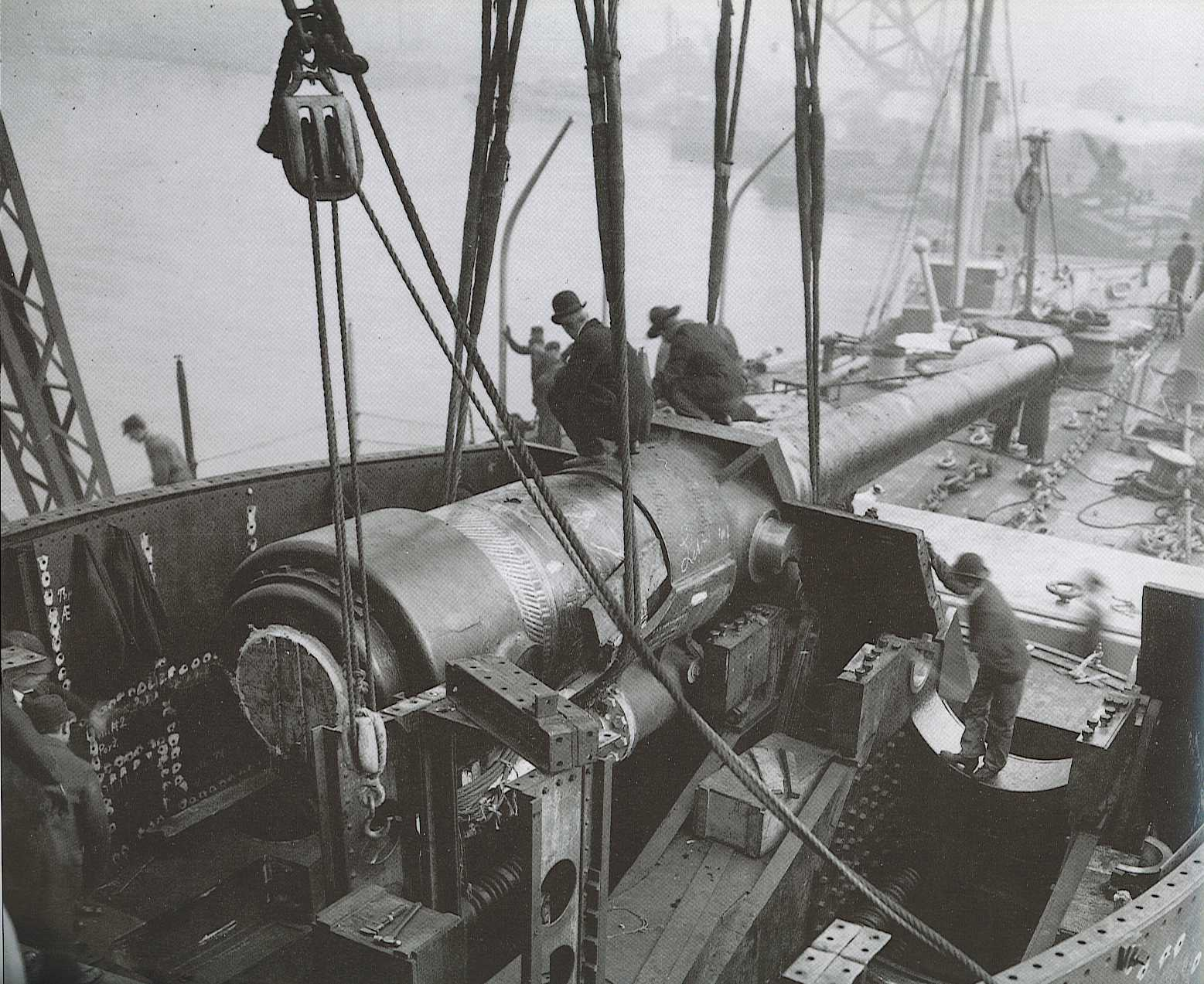
A 12-inch (305 mm)/45 caliber Mark 5 gun on Connecticut; the same guns were used on the South Carolinas

At a design displacement of 16,000 long tons, the South Carolina-class dreadnoughts were the same size as their Connecticut-class pre-dreadnought predecessors. In service, they could actually be lighter: Louisiana had a standard displacement of 15,272 long tons (15,517 t), while Michigan was only 14,891 long tons (15,130 t) by the same measurement. The ship's hull size was also comparable to the Connecticuts, with a length of 452 ft 9 in (138.00 m) overall, 450 ft 0 in (137.16 m) between perpendiculars, and the same at the waterline. The class' beam was 80 ft 2.5 in (24.448 m), draft was 24 ft 6 in (7.47 m), and metacentric height was 6.9 ft (2.1 m) normally, coming in slightly lower at 6.3 ft (1.9 m) when at full load. They were designed to carry about 869 men.

The South Carolinas had a propulsion system consisting of two vertical triple-expansion steam engines driving two 3-bladed screws. These were in turn powered by twelve coal-fired superheating Babcock & Wilcox water-tube boilers located in three watertight compartments. Together, they weighed 1,555 long tons (1,580 t), which was just over the specified contract limit. Traditional triple-expansion engines were installed rather than the steam turbines used in the British Dreadnought. The actual coal capacity of the ships was 2,374 long tons (2,412 t) at full load, slightly more than the designed maximum of 2,200 long tons (2,200 t), allowing for an endurance of 6,950 nmi (12,870 km; 8,000 mi) at 10 kn (19 km/h; 12 mph). While both ships surpassed 20 kn (37 km/h; 23 mph) in idealized trial conditions, the navy expected that the normal top speed would be around 18.5 kn (34.3 km/h; 21.3 mph).

The class' main battery consisted of eight 12-inch (305 mm)/45 caliber Mark 5 guns in four turrets, one pair fore and one aft, with 100 rounds for each gun. The guns were placed in an innovative superfiring arrangement, where one turret was mounted slightly behind and above the other. The anti-torpedo-boat secondary armament of twenty-two 3-inch (76 mm) guns was mounted in casemates, and the two 21-inch (533 mm) torpedo tubes were placed beneath the waterline, one on each side of the ship.

Armor on the South Carolina class was described by naval author Siegfried Breyer as "remarkably progressive", despite deficiencies in horizontal and underwater protection. The belt was thicker over the magazines, 12 to 10 inches (305 to 254 mm), than over the propulsion, 11 to 9 inches (279 to 229 mm), and in front of the forward magazines, 10 to 8 inches (254 to 203 mm). The casemates were also protected with 10 to 8 inches of armor, while the deck armor varied from 2.5 to 1 inch (64 to 25 mm). The turrets and conning tower had the heaviest armor, with 12–8–2.5 inches (face/side/roof; 305–203–63.5 mm) and 12 to 2 inches (305 to 51 mm), respectively. The barbettes were protected with 10 to 8 inches of armor. The total weight of the armor amounted to 31.4% of the design displacement, slightly more than the next three battleship classes.

== Ships in class ==
Ship	Hull No.	Builder	Laid down	Launched	Commissioned	Fate
South Carolina	BB-26	William Cramp & Sons	18 December 1906	11 July 1908	1 March 1910	Broken up as a result of the Washington Naval Treaty, 1924
Michigan	BB-27	New York Shipbuilding Corporation	17 December 1906	26 May 1908	4 January 1910	Broken up as a result of the Washington Naval Treaty, 1924

== Construction and trials ==
The contracts for the South Carolina class were awarded on 20 and 21 July, respectively. Without armor or armament, South Carolina would cost $3,540,000, while Michigan would come in at $3,585,000. With armor and armament, the ships cost about $7,000,000 each.

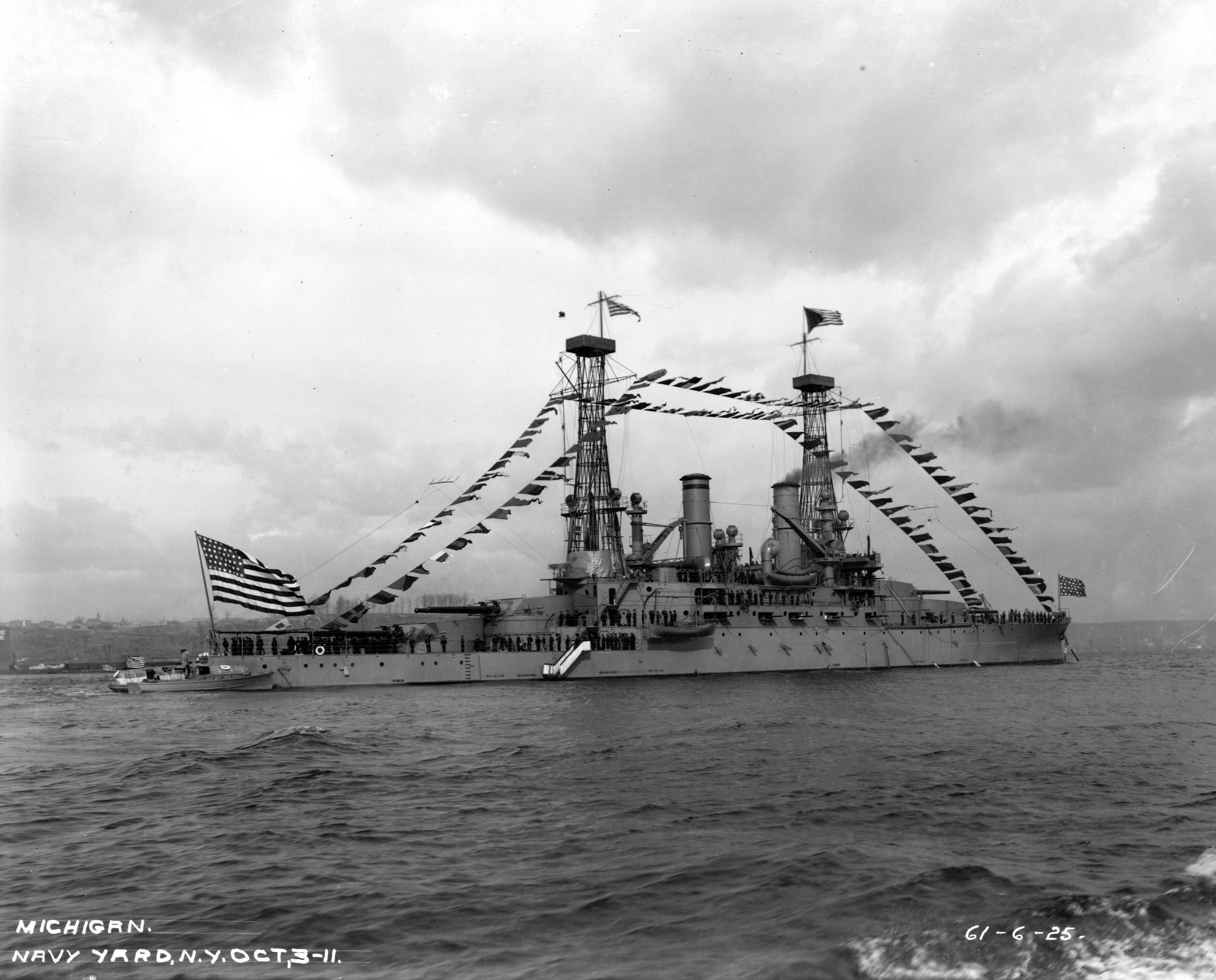
Michigan dressed with flags for a naval review off New York, 3 October 1911

Michigan's keel was laid down on 17 December 1906, one day before South Carolina's. After the initial construction periods, the ships were launched on 26 May and 11 July 1908 (respectively). Michigan was slightly more than half complete when launched, and the ship was christened by Carol Newberry, the daughter of Assistant Secretary of the Navy Truman Handy Newberry. The warship was billed as epoch-making, and the spectacle drew many prominent individuals, including the governor and lieutenant-governor of Michigan, the governor of New Jersey, the mayor of Detroit, and the secretary of the Interior Department, along with many naval admirals and constructors. Like its sister ship, South Carolina was just over halfway completed when it was launched. The accompanying ceremony took place just after noon and was attended by many notable residents of the state of South Carolina, including Governor Martin Frederick Ansel. His daughter Frederica christened the ship.

After their fitting-out stage, the two ships were put through sea trials to ensure they met their contracted specifications. The first attempt at putting Michigan through a trial was conducted at the navy's traditional testing grounds off Rockland, Maine, beginning on 9 June 1909. Although the ship completed its standardization run, other tests were disrupted when it ran aground on a sand bar. Although Michigan was pulled off without incident, the navy soon discovered that both propellers required repair, delaying the completion of the trials until 20–24 June. The battleship was commissioned several months later on 4 January 1910—making the United States the third country to have a dreadnought in commission, behind the United Kingdom and Germany, but just ahead of Brazil's Minas Geraes class—and its shakedown cruise lasted until 7 June.

South Carolina's trials were conducted off the Delaware Capes beginning on 24 August 1909, and its standardization runs were slightly faster than Michigan's. After final modifications at William Cramp, South Carolina was commissioned on 1 March 1910 and departed for a shakedown cruise six days later.

== Service history ==
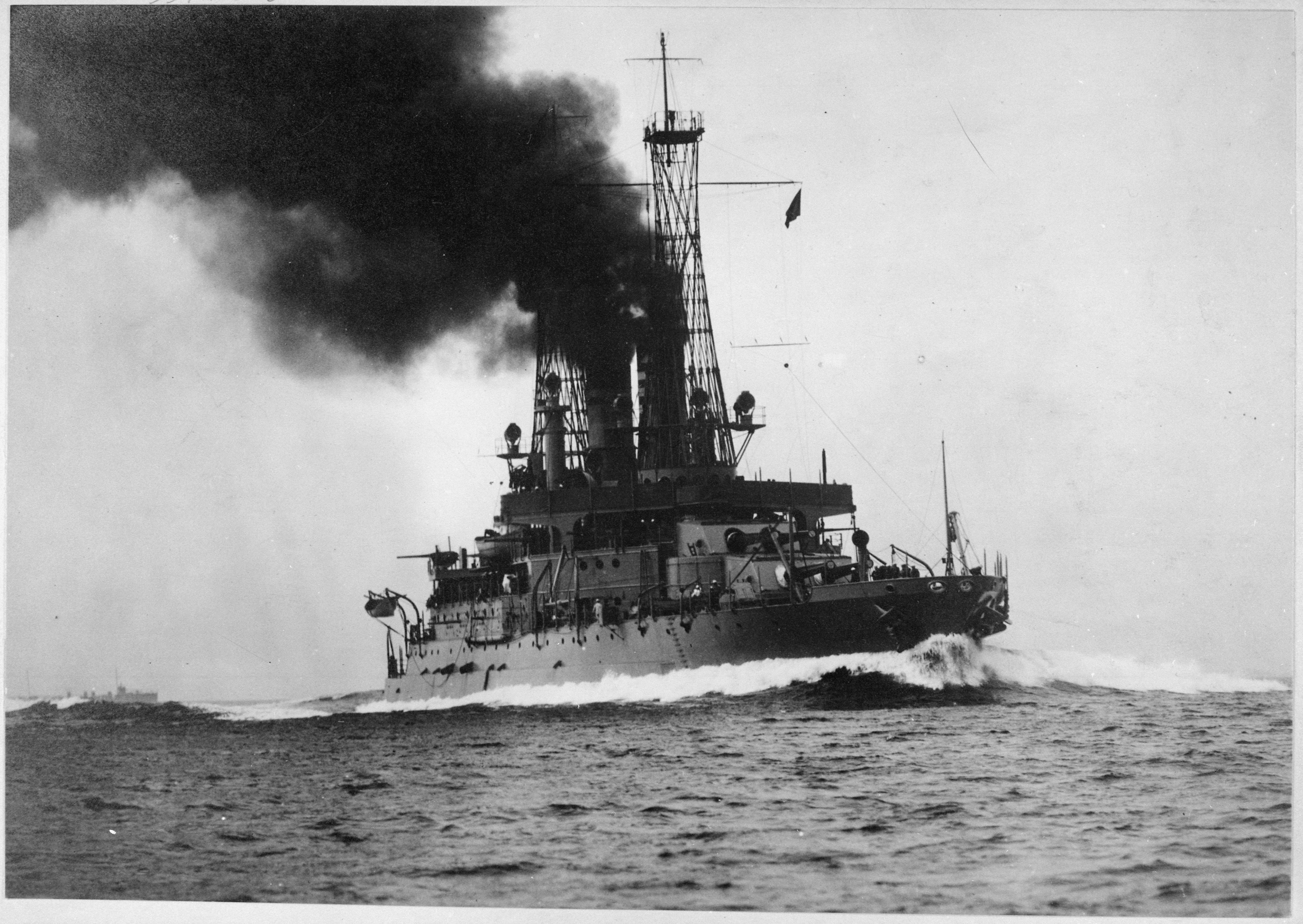
Michigan steaming at speed, c. 1918

After being commissioned, South Carolina and Michigan were both assigned to the US Atlantic Fleet. The two operated up and down the American east coast from July until November. On 2 November, as part of the Second Battleship Division, the ships left the Boston Navy Yard for a training voyage to Europe, where they visited the Isle of Portland in the United Kingdom and Cherbourg in France. In January 1911, they returned to the US naval base in Guantanamo Bay, Cuba, before continuing to Norfolk, Virginia. After further maneuvers, the two ships split up; Michigan remained on the east coast, while South Carolina embarked on another trip to Europe. The ship visited Copenhagen (Denmark), Stockholm (Sweden), Kronstadt (Russia), and Kiel (Germany)—the last during Kieler Woche, a large sailing event—before returning in July 1911.

South Carolina next took part in the 1911 naval review in New York, before several months of traveling to ports on the east coast and welcoming a visiting German naval squadron including the battlecruiser SMS Moltke and two light cruisers. After a three-month overhaul in Norfolk, South Carolina joined Michigan on a cruise to Pensacola, New Orleans, Galveston, and Veracruz in Mexico, as part of the Special Service Squadron. South Carolina later visited Colón, Panama, in January 1913. Both ships continued their previous service of visiting east coast ports before unrest in Mexico and the Caribbean caused the American government to order them away. South Carolina landed marines on Haiti on 28 January to protect the American delegation there. They returned to the ship when Oreste Zamor took power, but continued disorder later led the United States to occupy Haiti. South Carolina then joined Michigan at Veracruz while the United States occupied that city.

At the beginning of the First World War, both of the South Carolina-class battleships were grouped with two older pre-dreadnoughts (Vermont and Connecticut) due to their top speeds, which were lower than all subsequent US battleships. South Carolina was refitted in Philadelphia between 14 October and 20 February 1915, and both ships were kept on neutrality patrols on the American side of the Atlantic, even after the US entered the war on 6 April 1917. In January 1918, Michigan was training with the main fleet when it traveled through a strong storm. The high winds and waves caused its forward cage mast to collapse, killing six and injuring thirteen.

On 6 September 1918, South Carolina escorted a fast convoy partway across the Atlantic, becoming one of the first American battleships (alongside New Hampshire and Kansas) to do so. When returning to the United States, South Carolina lost its starboard propeller. When continuing with the port propeller, a valve in its engine malfunctioned; continuing with an auxiliary valve caused a large amount of vibration, so the ship was stopped just hours later for temporary repairs on the main valve before continuing to the Philadelphia Naval Yard for repairs. Michigan had the same problem when escorting a convoy in the next month; the ship lost its port propeller on 8 October, but managed to return home on 11 October without further incident. After the war's end on 11 November 1918, both South Carolina-class battleships were used to repatriate American soldiers that had been fighting in the war.

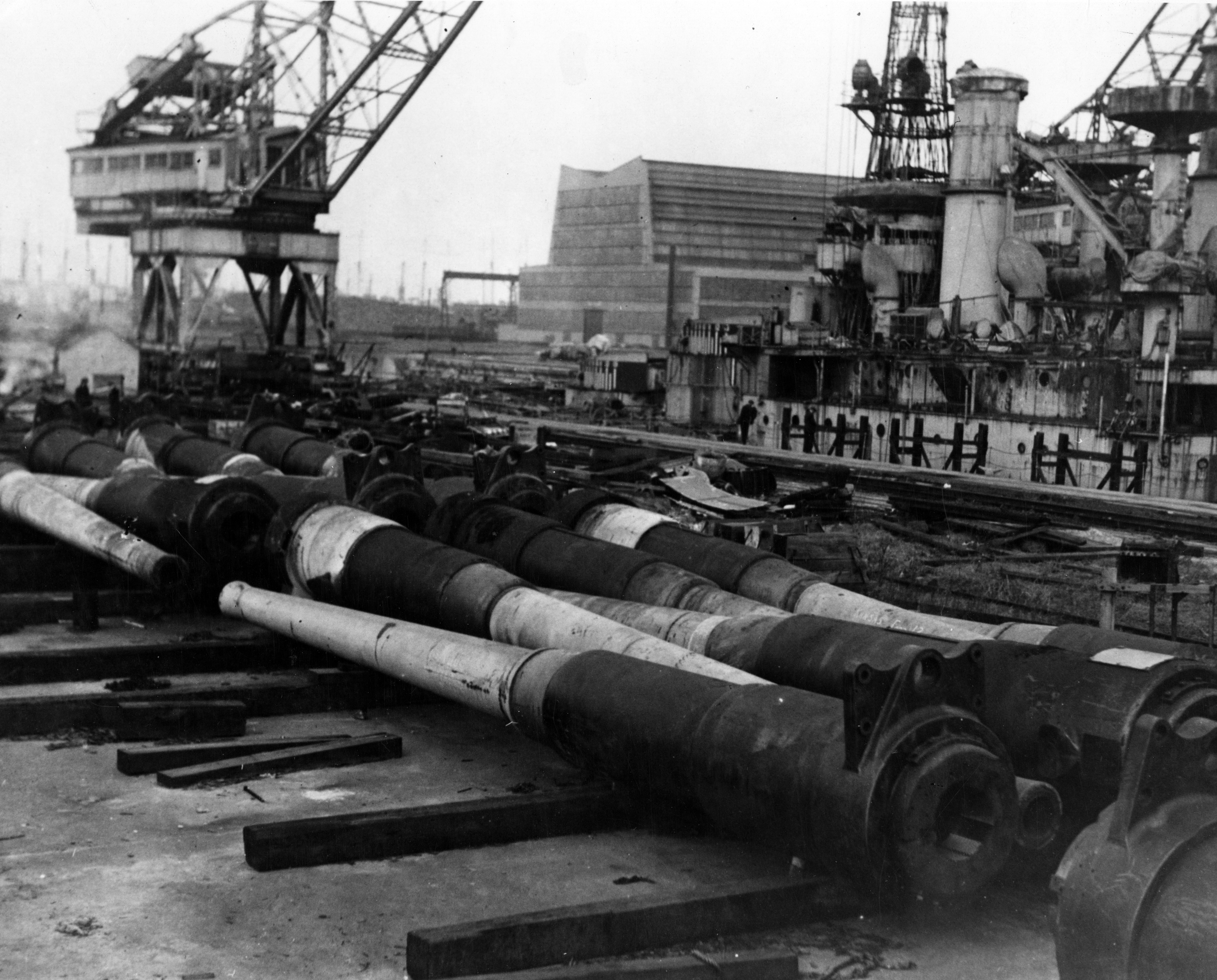
South Carolina's scrapping, with guns from previously dismantled battleships stacked in front of the ship

In the years after the war, the two battleships were used for training cruises. The terms of the 1922 Washington Naval Treaty, which limited naval construction to avert a vastly expensive naval arms race, also called for disposing of dozens of older battleships in the signatories' navies. South Carolina was decommissioned on 15 December 1921, shortly before the end of the conference, and its sister followed on 11 February 1922, days after the treaty was signed. Both were stricken from the navy listing on 10 November 1923 and scrapped during 1924 in the Philadelphia Naval Yard.
