= Charles Etienne =

Charles Etienne may refer to:

- Charles Estienne (1504–1564), French anatomist
- Charles-Guillaume Étienne (1778–1845), French playwright
- Charles Oscar Etienne, notorious chief of the Haitian National Police
