= Lattice mast =

Type of observation mast on warships

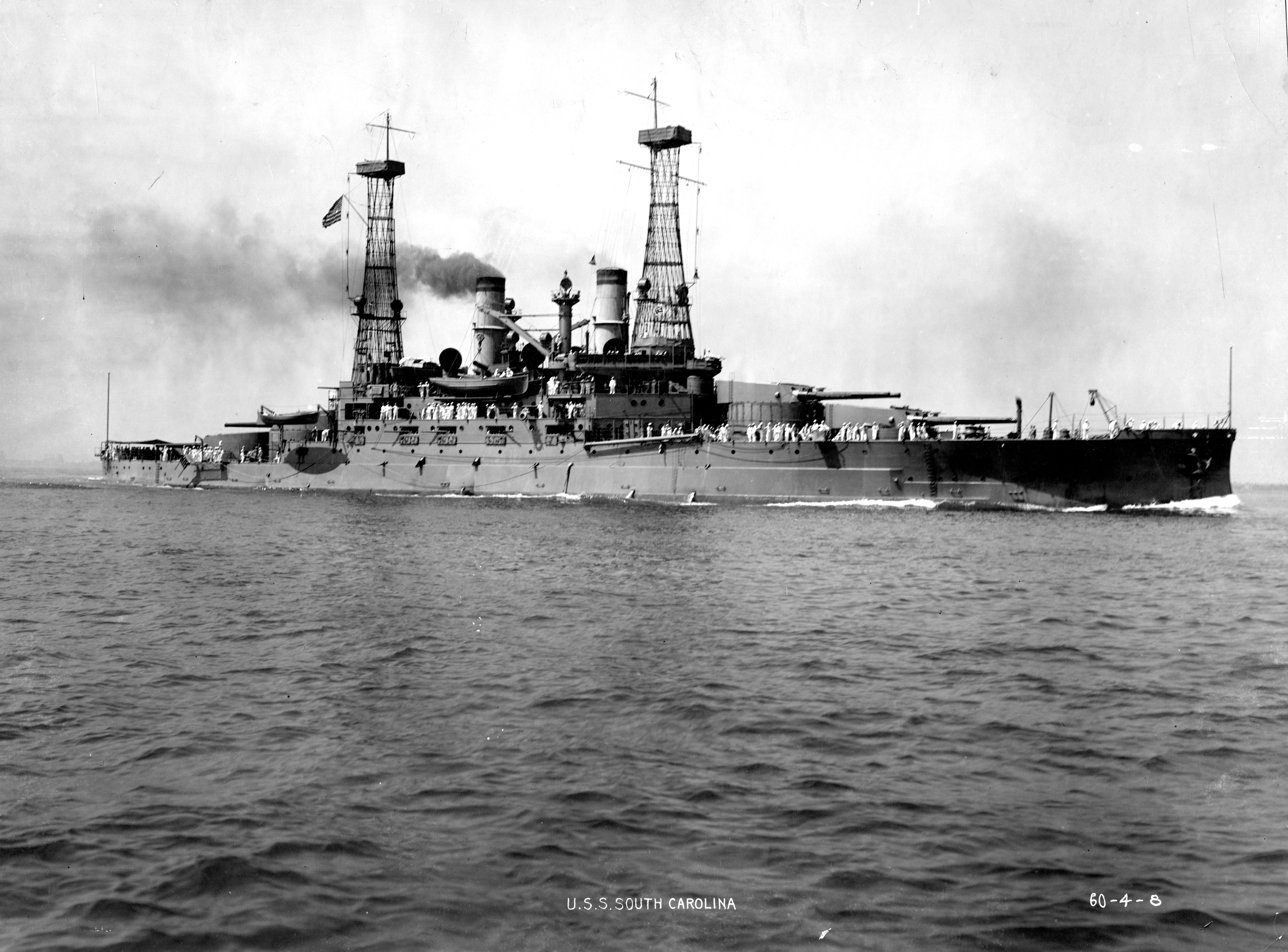
USS South Carolina, the first American battleship with lattice masts.

Lattice masts, or cage masts, or basket masts, are a type of observation mast common on United States Navy major warships in the early 20th century. They are a type of hyperboloid structure, whose weight-saving design was invented by the Russian engineer Vladimir Shukhov. They were used most prominently on American dreadnought battleships and armored cruisers of the World War I era.

In the Age of Sail, masts were required to support the sails, and lookouts were posted on them; with the advent of engine-powered warships, masts were retained and used for observation and to spot fall of shot. The purpose of the lattice structure was to make the posts less vulnerable to shells from enemy ships, and to better absorb the shock caused by firing heavy guns, isolating the delicate fire control equipment (rangefinders, etc.) mounted on the mast tops. However, the masts were found to be easily damaged by the inclement weather experienced at sea by naval ships during typhoons and hurricanes: USS Michigan's mast was bent right down to the deck by such a storm in 1918. As the caliber and range of ships' guns increased, heavier rangefinders were required, and the powerful guns and engines created shock and vibrations; lattice masts were eventually phased out in favor of the more rigid tripod masts favoured by the Royal Navy.

== Use in the United States Navy ==
The South Carolina-class battleships of 1910 were the first class of American battleships to feature lattice masts, which were to become a standard fixture on all American battleships, and many cruiser classes. Older vessels, including the first modern American battleship, Indiana, were modernized with lattice masts during the period.

During 1912, gunnery tests were carried out by the US Navy Department on a lattice or basket mast specially installed on the San Marcos (formerly USS Texas), to see how capable the design was of withstanding sustained gunfire. The mast was prefabricated in the Norfolk navy yard and shipped out for installation.

"As a result of the firing tests carried out some months ago against a lattice mast that had been erected on the San Marcos, now lying on the mud in Chesapeake Bay, the navy department has decided to make the lattice or basket mast the standard type for future warships. The mast, under test, showed remarkable endurance, several successful hits being necessary to bring it down."

The New York Times, on the other hand, carried an unfavourable notice. By 1917 only the lowest ribs at the base of the mast remained.

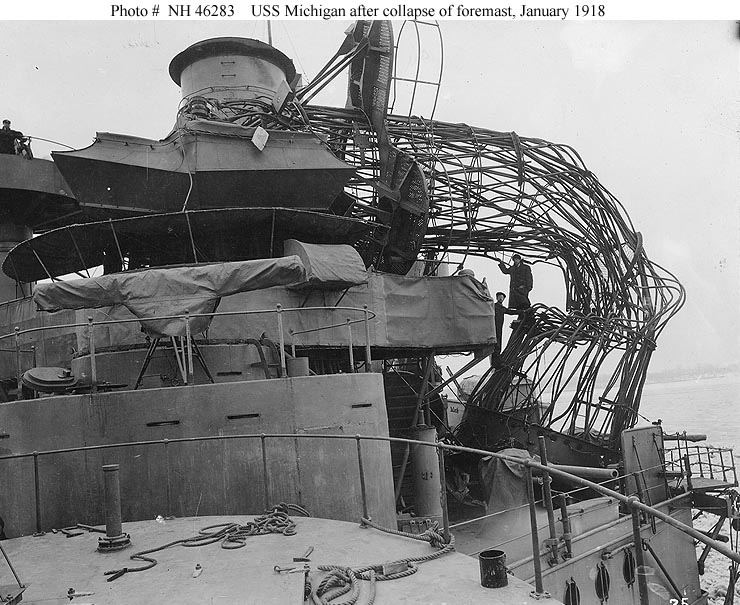
The collapsed foremast on the USS Michigan

In January 1918, the lattice foremast of the battleship USS Michigan collapsed in a severe storm; the heavy seas put excessive stress on the mast and the weight of the fire control equipment caused the mast to fail at the narrowest point. The incident spurred an investigation by the Bureau of Construction and Repair, which found that the failure was likely because the mast had been lengthened, with a new section spliced in where the mast broke. In addition, fragments from a recent explosion in one of the ship's 12-inch (305 mm) guns had damaged the mast, and the damage had not been adequately repaired. Nevertheless, the investigation also found that the mast aboard the battleship Connecticut also showed signs of buckling. Throughout the 1920s and 1930s, the Navy repeatedly found evidence of structural problems in the masts, in large part due to the corrosive effects of funnel gases.

At the same time as the Michigan incident, US Navy officers were also gaining experience with British tripod masts for the first time while serving with the Grand Fleet during World War I. Unlike lattice masts, the heavier tripods did not suffer from vibration when steaming at high speed, and they were not as susceptible to shock from gunfire, which caused the lattice masts to whip from the concussion.

All American battleships up to the Colorado-class battleships (1921–1923) were equipped with lattice masts, although in the 1920s to 1930s, the older battleships had their lattice masts replaced with more modern tripod masts, concomitant with the addition of larger, much heavier fire-control director tops. The newer Tennessee and Colorado classes retained their original lattice masts, of heavier construction than those on earlier ships, at the start of World War II.

== Use in other navies ==
Only four battleships were completed with lattice masts for other navies. The two Andrei Pervozvanny-class battleships of the Imperial Russian Navy had lattice masts until they were replaced with conventional masts at the beginning of the First World War. The two United States-built Rivadavia-class battleships of the Argentine Navy, Rivadavia and Moreno, had lattice masts. They were the only dreadnought-type battleships built for export by the US. Two other battleships, the US pre-dreadnoughts Mississippi and Idaho, were sold to Greece in 1914; they retained their lattice masts until their sinking by the Germans in 1941.

Some navies considered lattice masts for their ships. Following their experience with the Andrei Pervozvannys, the four Russian Gangut-class battleships, initially designed with lattice masts, were constructed with pole ones. The German Imperial Navy designed its first battlecruiser, SMS Von der Tann, with lattice masts, but she was instead completed with pole masts.

== Use in fortifications ==
A lattice fire-control mast was installed on Fort Drum, a fort built by the United States to guard the entrance of Manila Bay. The mast directed the fire of the fort's 14-inch main batteries.
