= USS South Carolina (BB-26) =

Dreadnought battleship of the United States Navy

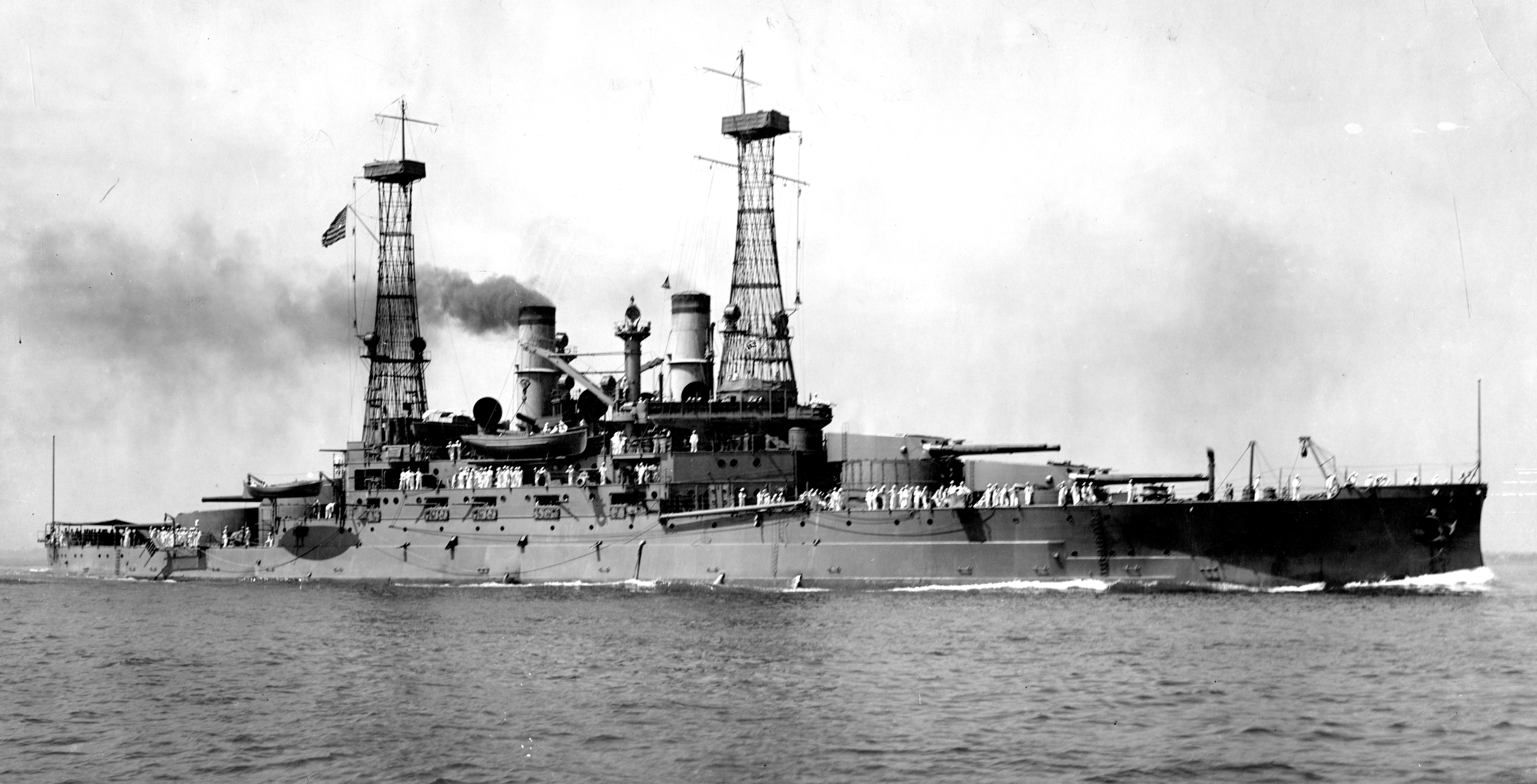
- USS South Carolina (BB-26)

History

United States
- Name: South Carolina
- Namesake: South Carolina
- Builder: William Cramp & Sons, Philadelphia
- Laid down: 18 December 1906
- Launched: 11 July 1908
- Commissioned: 1 March 1910
- Decommissioned: 15 December 1921
- Stricken: 10 November 1923
- Fate: Sold for scrap, 24 April 1924

General characteristics
- Class & type: South Carolina-class battleship
- Displacement: Normal: 16,000 long tons (16,257 t); Full load: 17,617 long tons (17,900 t)
- Length: 452 ft 9 in (138 m) (overall); 450 ft (137 m) (waterline)
- Beam: 80 ft 3 in (24 m)
- Draft: 24 ft 6 in (7 m)
- Installed power: 12 × Babcock & Wilcox water-tube boilers; 16,500 ihp (12,304 kW)
- Propulsion: 2 × triple-expansion steam engines; 2 × screw propellers
- Speed: 18.5 kn (21 mph; 34 km/h)
- Range: 6,950 nmi (7,998 mi; 12,871 km) at 10 kn (12 mph; 19 km/h)
- Complement: 869
- Armament: 8 × 12 in (305 mm)/45 caliber Mark 5 guns; 22 × 3 in (76 mm)/50 caliber guns; 2 × 3-pounder 47 mm (1.85 in)/40 caliber guns; 8 × 1-pounder 37 mm (1.46 in) guns; 2 × 21 in (533 mm) torpedo tubes (submerged)
- Armor: Belt: 12–8 in (305–203 mm); Casemates: 10–8 in (254–203 mm); Barbettes: 10–8 in (254–203 mm); Turrets: Face: 12 in; Side: 8 in; Roof: 2.5 in (64 mm); Decks: 2.5 – 1 in (25 mm); Conning tower: 12 in – 2 in (51 mm)

USS South Carolina (BB-26), the lead ship of her class of dreadnought battleships, was the fourth ship of the United States Navy to be named in honor of the eighth state. She was also the first American dreadnought; though she did not incorporate turbine propulsion like HMS Dreadnought, South Carolina's design included revolutionary aspects as well, primarily the superfiring arrangement of her main battery. The ship was laid down in December 1906 and launched in July 1908 before being commissioned into the US Atlantic Fleet in March 1910.

South Carolina spent much of her career in the Atlantic and Caribbean patrolling the eastern coast of the United States. She made two trips to Europe in 1910 and 1911 and participated in a visit by a German cruiser squadron in 1912. In 1913–14, she frequently patrolled the coast of Mexico to protect American interests during the Mexican Revolution, and in April 1914 she took part in the United States occupation of Veracruz. After the United States entered World War I in April 1917, South Carolina trained sailors for the rapidly expanding wartime navy, and in late 1918, she was assigned to convoy escort duty. An accident with her propellers in September kept her from active service for the remainder of the conflict. In 1919, she made four trips to bring American soldiers back from Europe. Midshipmen training cruises followed in 1920–21, but the Washington Naval Treaty of 1922 cut her career short. She was broken up for scrap as part of the arms limitation treaty, starting in mid-1924.

== Design ==
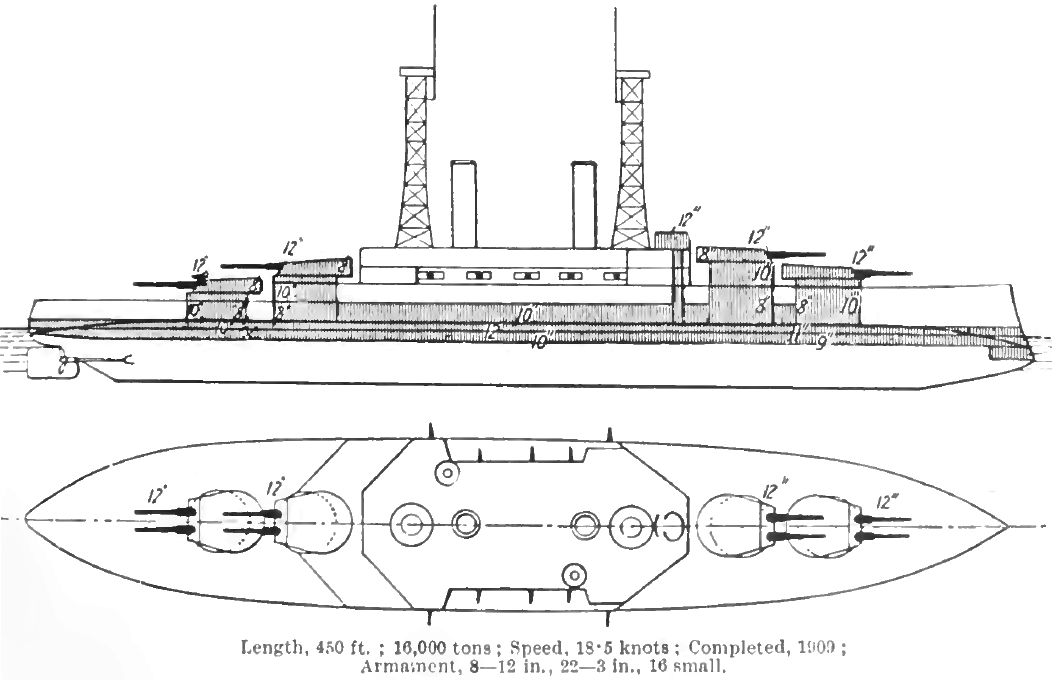
Line-drawing of the South Carolina class

South Carolina was 452 ft 9 in (138 m) long overall and had a beam of 80 ft 3 in (24 m) and a draft of 24 ft 6 in (7 m). She displaced 16,000 long tons (16,257 t) as designed and up to 17,617 long tons (17,900 t) at full load. The ship was powered by two-shaft vertical triple-expansion engines rated at 16,500 ihp (12,304 kW) and twelve coal-fired Babcock & Wilcox boilers, generating a top speed of 18.5 kn (34 km/h; 21 mph). The ship had a cruising range of 5,000 nmi (9,260 km; 5,754 mi) at a speed of 10 kn (19 km/h; 12 mph). She had a crew of 869 officers and men.

The ship was armed with a main battery of eight 12-inch (305 mm)/45 (Note: /45 refers to the length of the gun in terms of calibers. A /45 caliber gun is 45 times as long as it is in bore diameter so the 12 inch gun was 45 feet long.) caliber Mark 5 guns in four twin gun turrets on the centerline, which were placed in two superfiring pairs forward and aft. The secondary battery consisted of twenty-two 3-inch (76 mm)/50 guns mounted in casemates along the side of the hull. As was standard for capital ships of the period, she carried a pair of 21-inch (533 mm) torpedo tubes, submerged in her hull on the broadside.

South Carolina's main armored belt was 12 in (305 mm) thick over the magazines, 10 in (254 mm) over the machinery spaces, and 8 in (203 mm) elsewhere. The armored deck was 1.5 to 2.5 in (38 to 64 mm) thick. The gun turrets had 12 inch thick faces, while the supporting barbettes had 10 inch thick armor plating. Ten inch thick armor also protected the casemate guns. The conning tower had 12 inch thick sides.

== Service history ==
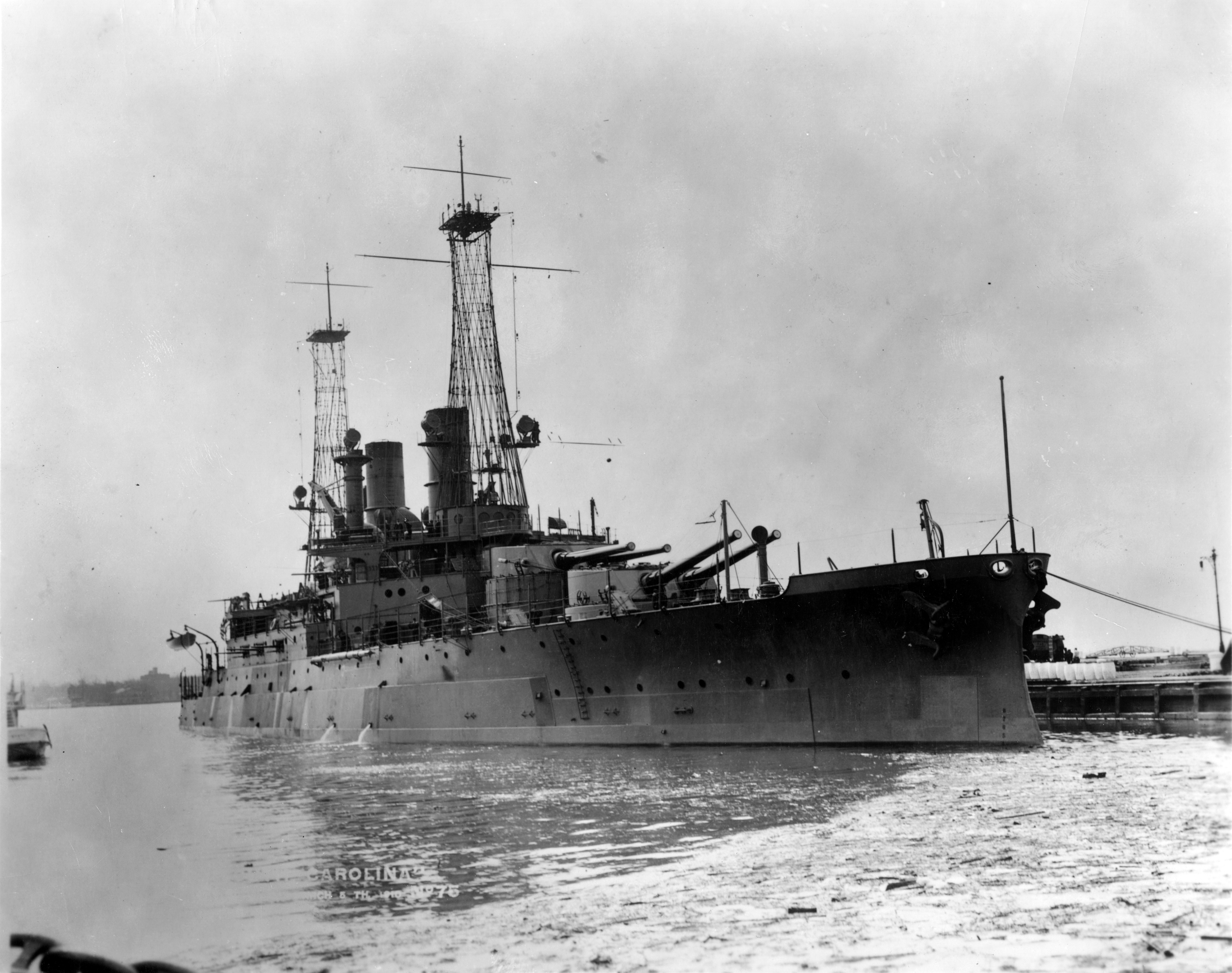
South Carolina in port in 1910

The keel for South Carolina was laid down at the William Cramp & Sons shipyard in Philadelphia on 18 December 1906. The completed hull was launched on 11 July 1908. Fitting-out work was completed by the end of February 1910, and she was commissioned into the fleet on 1 March. She was then assigned to the Atlantic Fleet. Five days after her commissioning, the ship steamed out of Philadelphia for her shakedown cruise, which took the ship to the Caribbean Sea and included stops in the Danish West Indies and Cuba, before returning to the United States for a visit to Charleston in her namesake state, which lasted from 10 to 15 April. Sea trials followed; they were conducted off the Virginia Capes and outside Provincetown, Massachusetts. South Carolina then visited New York City on 17–18 June to take part in a reception for former President Theodore Roosevelt. The ship spent most of the rest of the year conducting fleet maneuvers, training naval militia, and receiving repairs at Norfolk, Virginia.

On 1 November 1910, South Carolina left the United States for a trip to Europe with the 2nd Battleship Division. During the tour, the Division stopped in Cherbourg and Portland. The ships arrived back in Norfolk on 12 January 1911, where South Carolina entered the shipyard for maintenance. She then returned to the fleet, which conducted battle training off the coast of New England. The ship made a short stop in New York City before joining the 2nd Battleship Division for another tour of Europe. This trip included stops in Copenhagen, Stockholm, and Kronstadt. On the way back from Kronstadt, South Carolina stopped in Kiel, where the German Kaiser Wilhelm II was hosting the annual Kieler Woche (Kiel Week) sailing regatta. South Carolina arrived off Provincetown on 13 July and continued to the Chesapeake Bay, where she conducted battle practice.

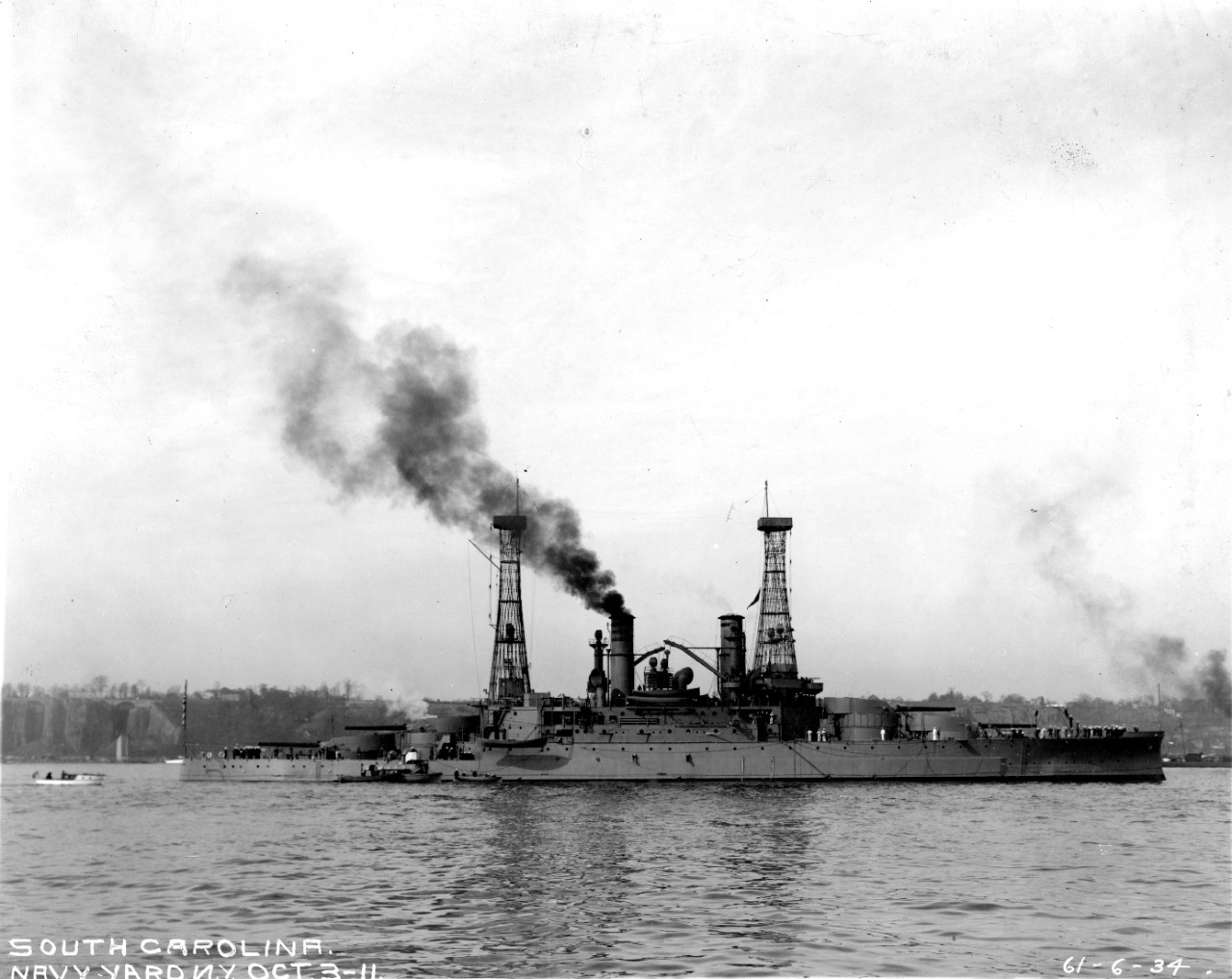
South Carolina in the New York Navy Yard on 3 October 1911

In late 1911, South Carolina was present for a naval review in New York City before conducting training exercises with the 1st Squadron off Newport, Rhode Island. The ship then steamed south on 3 January 1912 for training exercises off Guantánamo Bay, Cuba before returning to Norfolk on 13 March. She cruised the east coast of the United States from March to late June. That month, she participated in a reception for a visit by the German battlecruiser SMS Moltke and the light cruisers Bremen and Stettin in New York. On 30 June, South Carolina returned to Norfolk for an overhaul. In early October, the ship steamed to New York for a visit that lasted from 11 to 15 October. The first half of November was spent conducting training exercises off New England and the Virginia Capes. She then steamed south with the Special Service Division for a tour of the Caribbean; stops included Pensacola, New Orleans, Galveston, and Veracruz.

=== Unrest in the Caribbean and World War I ===
South Carolina was back in Norfolk by 20 December, where she remained until 6 January 1913. She then departed for another trip south, this time to Colón, Panama, at the entrance to the recently completed Panama Canal. The ship then took part in maneuvers off Guantánamo Bay before returning to Norfolk on 22 March. Another cruise off the east coast of the United States followed, and included a stop in New York from 28 to 31 May, where the USS Maine National Monument was dedicated. The ship briefly trained midshipmen from the US Naval Academy in June before departing at the end of the month for Mexico. There, she cruised off Tampico and Veracruz to protect American interests during the Mexican Civil War. She returned to Norfolk for an overhaul in September that lasted until January 1914.

South Carolina then took part in training exercises off Culebra Island. On 28 January, the ship sent a contingent of Marines ashore in Port-au-Prince, Haiti, to secure the American embassy during a period of unrest in the country, as well as to set up a radio station there. She left the city on 14 April after tensions calmed following the election of President Oreste Zamor. South Carolina coaled at Key West before continuing on to Veracruz, where she took part in the occupation of the city. The ship left Veracruz in July and spent the next several months cruising off the Dominican Republic and Haiti to monitor the political situations in the neighboring countries. She returned to Norfolk on 24 September; by this time, World War I had broken out in Europe, though the United States initially remained neutral.

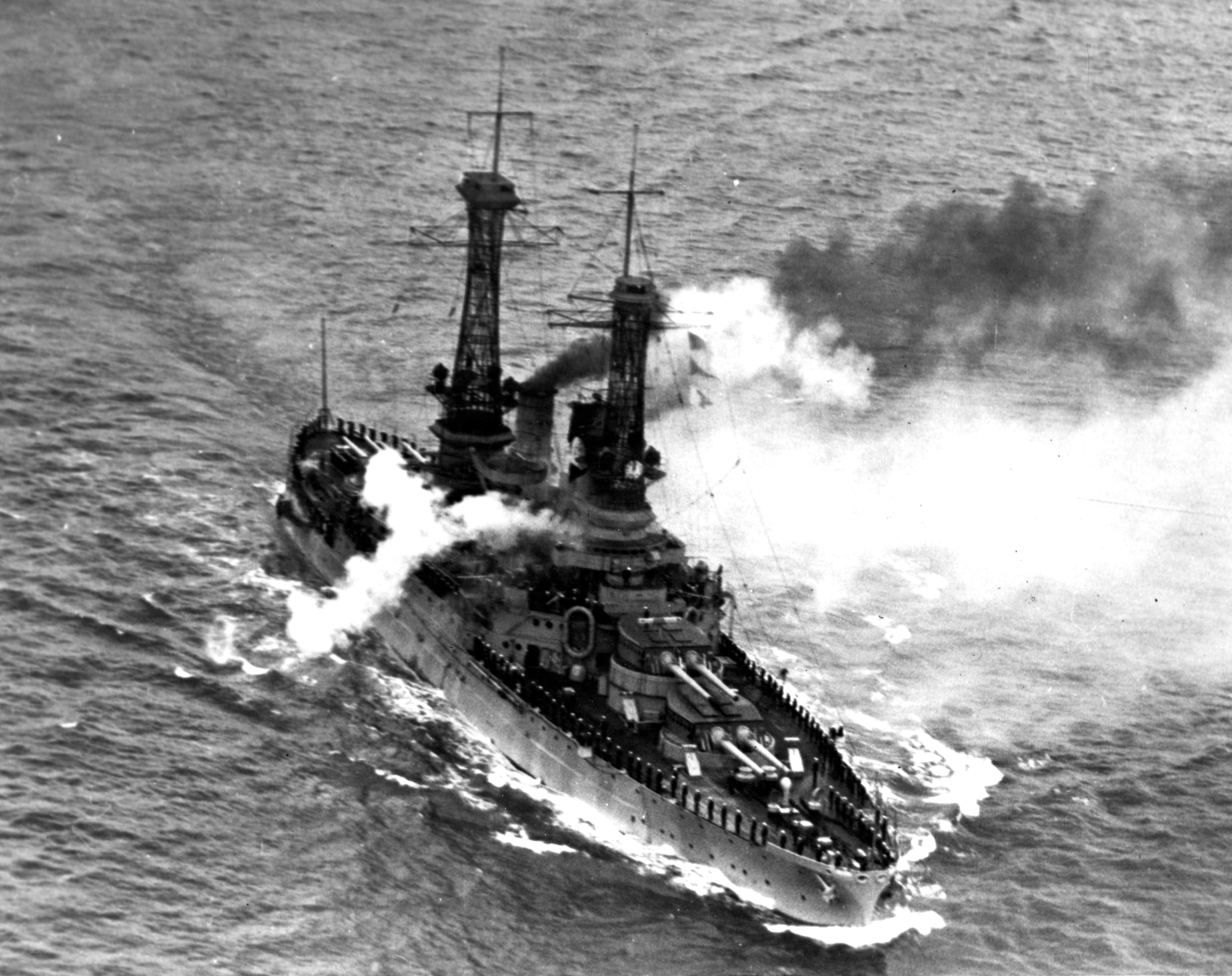
South Carolina. Crew manning the rails and firing salutes, 28 April 1921

On 14 October, the ship went to Philadelphia for an overhaul that lasted until 20 February 1915. She thereafter steamed to Cuba for the routine peacetime training maneuvers. At the time, tensions between the United States and Germany were high due to the sinking of the passenger ship RMS Lusitania by a U-boat, though the Germans agreed to suspend their unrestricted submarine warfare campaign. For the next two years, she followed the same pattern: training exercises off Cuba in the first quarter of the year, followed by maneuvers off Newport, and periodic maintenance at the end of the year at Philadelphia. On 6 April 1917, the United States declared war on Germany over the latter's resumption of the unrestricted submarine campaign earlier that year. South Carolina continued to cruise off the east coast of the United States through August 1918.

Starting in September, South Carolina and the pre-dreadnoughts of the Atlantic Fleet began escorting convoys to France. On 6 September, she departed with the pre-dreadnoughts Kansas and New Hampshire to protect a fast HX troopship convoy. On 16 September, the three battleships left the convoy in the Atlantic and steamed back to the United States, while other escorts brought the convoy into port. On the 17th, South Carolina lost her starboard propeller, which forced her to reduce speed to 11 kn (20 km/h; 13 mph) using only the port shaft. On 20 September, the port engine stopped after a throttle valve broke down. She got underway temporarily using an auxiliary throttle before severe vibration forced her to stop for six hours while the main throttle was fixed. Four days later, the ships reached the United States and South Carolina made her way to Philadelphia for repairs. After South Carolina returned to service, she participated in gunnery training, which continued until Germany signed the Armistice of 11 November 1918 that ended the fighting in Europe. In mid-February 1919, South Carolina began the first of four round trips between the United States and Brest, France to bring American soldiers back from Europe. In the course of the voyages, the last of which concluded in late July, the ship had carried over 4,000 soldiers home. She then went to the Norfolk Navy Yard for a lengthy overhaul.

=== Later career ===
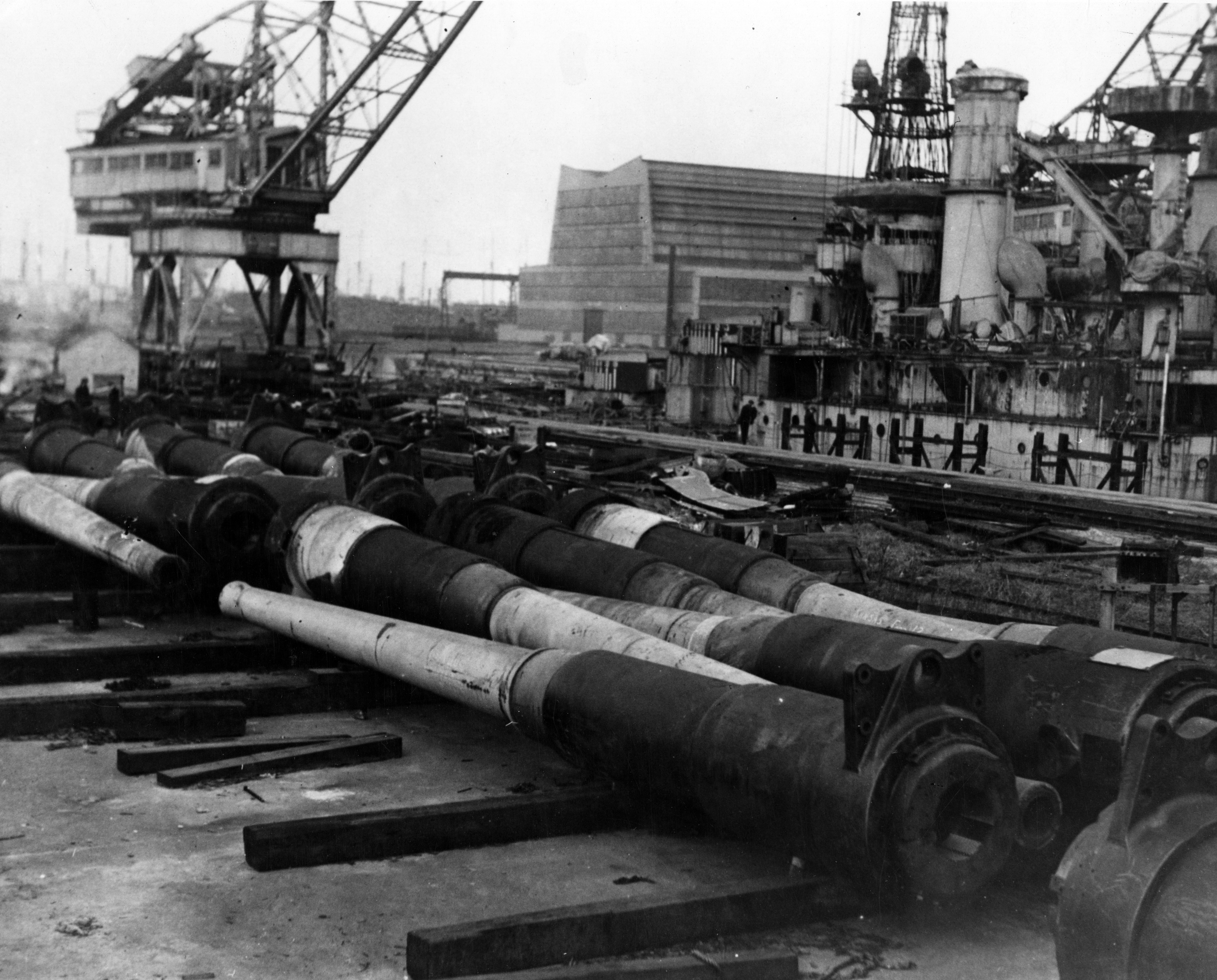
South Carolina being dismantled in Philadelphia Navy Yard in December 1923.

After returning to service, the ship took on a contingent of midshipmen for a training cruise to the Pacific. On 5 June 1920, South Carolina began the voyage, crossing into the Pacific via the Panama Canal. She stopped in Hawaii before continuing on to the west coast of the United States, with visits in Seattle, San Francisco, and San Diego. She left the last port on 11 August and arrived back in Annapolis on 2 September. After disembarking the midshipmen there, she went to Philadelphia, where she remained for seven months. South Carolina returned to sea in early April 1921 for training off Culebra Island, followed by exercises in Chesapeake Bay. Another training cruise for midshipmen began on 29 May, this time to Europe. Ports of call included Christiania, Norway, and Lisbon, Portugal. She returned to Annapolis via Guantanmo Bay on 30 August before proceeding to Philadelphia the next day.

In the years immediately following the end of the Great War, the United States, Britain, and Japan all launched huge naval construction programs. All three countries decided that a new naval arms race would be ill-advised, and so convened the Washington Naval Conference to discuss arms limitations, which produced the Washington Naval Treaty, signed in February 1922. Under the terms of Article II of the treaty, South Carolina and her sister Michigan were to be scrapped. (Note: Washington Naval Treaty, Chapter I: Article II.) The ship was decommissioned on 15 December, but was not formally stricken from the Naval Vessel Register until 10 November 1923. She was sold for scrap on 24 April 1924 and subsequently dismantled.

The ship's silver service was commissioned by the state of South Carolina and was presented on 11 April 1910. After South Carolina was withdrawn from service in 1922, the service was given to the South Carolina chapter of the Daughters of the American Revolution for display at the Old Exchange. Following the outbreak of World War II, the service was hidden in the basement of the Old Exchange for safekeeping. In 1947, they were retrieved and sent to the South Carolina Governor's Mansion, where they are currently on display.
