= Joseph Davilmar Théodore =

President of Haiti (1847–1917)

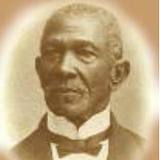

23rd President of Haiti
- In office 7 November 1914 – 22 February 1915
- Preceded by: Oreste Zamor
- Succeeded by: Jean Vilbrun Guillaume Sam

Personal details
- Born: March 25, 1847 Ouanaminthe, Haiti
- Died: 13 January 1917 (aged 69) Port-au-Prince, Haiti
- Party: Cacos

Joseph Davilmar Théodore (French pronunciation: [ʒozɛf davilmaʁ teɔdɔʁ]; March 25, 1847 – January 13, 1917) was President of Haiti from 7 November 1914 to 22 February 1915. Born in the town of Ennery in the northern half of the country, he began his career in the military and organized the cacao farmers of the north in the revolt against President Oreste Zamor. His inability to pay the farmers as he had promised for participating in the rebellion soon led to his resignation in favor of Jean Vilbrun Guillaume Sam. Théodore served as the President of the Senate of Haiti in 1910.

== Early life ==
Joseph Davilmar Theodore "Bon Da" was born in Ouanaminthe on March 25, 1846. He was the son of Ismée Theodore and Adélaïde Sejourné. His father was originally from Grande-Riviere du Nord and his mother from Jeremie. He worked beside Sylvain Salnave from the age of 18 and served in the Haitian Navy. He became Consul of Haiti to Dajabon, Mayor of Ouananminthe, and Senator of The Republic in 1888. Like many Haitians in the past, he made his fortune in agriculture. On March 17, 1897, he started receiving his pension of 100 gourdes a month, which is 3230.27 gourdes in today's money.

== Revolution ==
In 1911, Théodore became President of the Senate. On February 2, 1914, he opposed the new president while being in close collaboration with the popular Rosalvo Bobo. With the latter, he led an open war against Oreste Zamor. For this, he organized the revolt of cocoa farmers, known as the Cacos, in the North and promised to pay them if they joined the rebellion against the "Zandolits", Zamor's troops. On February 5, Davilmar Théodore's troops, who could not get to Port-au-Prince because they were barred by Oreste Zamor's army in the Artibonite, arrived in Cap-Haitien and engaged in the systematic looting of the city. The city was looted and set on fire, but the unrest ended when the American warship USS Nashville arrived opposite Cap-Haitien. Théodore then won the Grande Rivière du Nord and organized a Cacos revolt.

== Presidency and fall ==
On February 8, Oreste Zamor, whose troops had triumphed over Davilmar Théodore's insurrectionary army a few days earlier, stormed the National Assembly and was elected President of Haiti. On October 19, Davilmar became head of the executive power. On November 7, he was elected President of Haiti for a mandate of seven years, replacing Oreste Zamor. After taking office, he appointed his ally, Rosalvo Bobo, as Minister of the Interior and Secretary of Finance. As the new president, Théodore struck a monetary deal with the US government, in exchange for the takeover of customs, railways, and banks. Unfortunately, his inability to pay the farmers as he had promised for participating in the rebellion soon led to his resignation in favor of Jean Vilbrun Guillaume Sam. Under his tenure, on December 17, 1914, the US Marines disembarked from the warship USS Machias (PG-5) and entered the National Bank compound and took boxes containing $500,000 in gold coins. This money deposited at the City Bank has never been returned to Haiti. Money and tickets no longer had any value. "Bons Da", contemptuously called after the President's nickname, were printed to pay the troops. The United States, which had replaced France as the protector of the national bank since January 1, 1915, refused to recognize the new currency. Unable to cope with the economic pressures facing the different social strata, and after a new levy of Cacos commanded by Vilbrun Guillaume Sam, the president withdrew and resigned on February 22, 1915.

== Exile and death ==
After his resignation, Théodore went into exile in Curacaos and then went to Jamaica. After the revolution of 1915, he went back to Haiti and settled in the capital, where he died on January 13, 1917. The new president, Philippe Sudre Dartiguenave, refused, on orders from the Americans, to organize a national funeral for the former president, because of his anti-American policy.

Political offices
Preceded by Oreste Zamor	President of Haïti; 1914–1915	Succeeded by Jean Vilbrun Guillaume Sam
