= Charles Oscar Etienne =

Haitian police chief (c.1866-1915)

Charles Oscar Etienne, also known as Chaloska (in Haitian Creole), was a notorious chief of the Haitian National Police who massacred over 150 political prisoners in Port-au-Prince in 1915. Shortly after this mass murder, the relatives of the incarcerated had taken Charles Oscar, who was taking refuge in the Dominican legation, and murdered him in the city center of Haiti. His brutal reign resulted in his likeness being used as a popular bogeyman carnival costume known as Chaloska.

== Biography ==
Charles Oscar Etienne served as the chief of the national police under president Villbrun Guillaume Sam. According to Ayibo Post, Oscar Etienne was born on January 1, 1866, and he was murdered on July 28, 1915. Mainly responsible for Chaloska's death was General Edmond Polynice.

== Chaloska ==
Carnival in Haiti, also known as Kanaval or Mardi Gras, is an annual celebration of Haitian identity, culture, revolution, and freedom. It is also an observation of the history of colonialism and slavery in the country, and a place for political artistic expression through various mediums and performances. Carnival goers often wear masks and costumes to portray historical, literary, or popular cultural figures. One of the many figures that can be seen in Carnival is Charles Oscar (Chaloska) who is portrayed in mockery with a military costume and a mask with a large red mouth and large teeth attached. A group of Chaloskas will enact a performance where one Chaloska dies and another replaces him to reflect the cycle of a system that does not change. By wearing such masks and participating in these performances, the Carnival goers are able to express their discontent and disproval of the political climate.

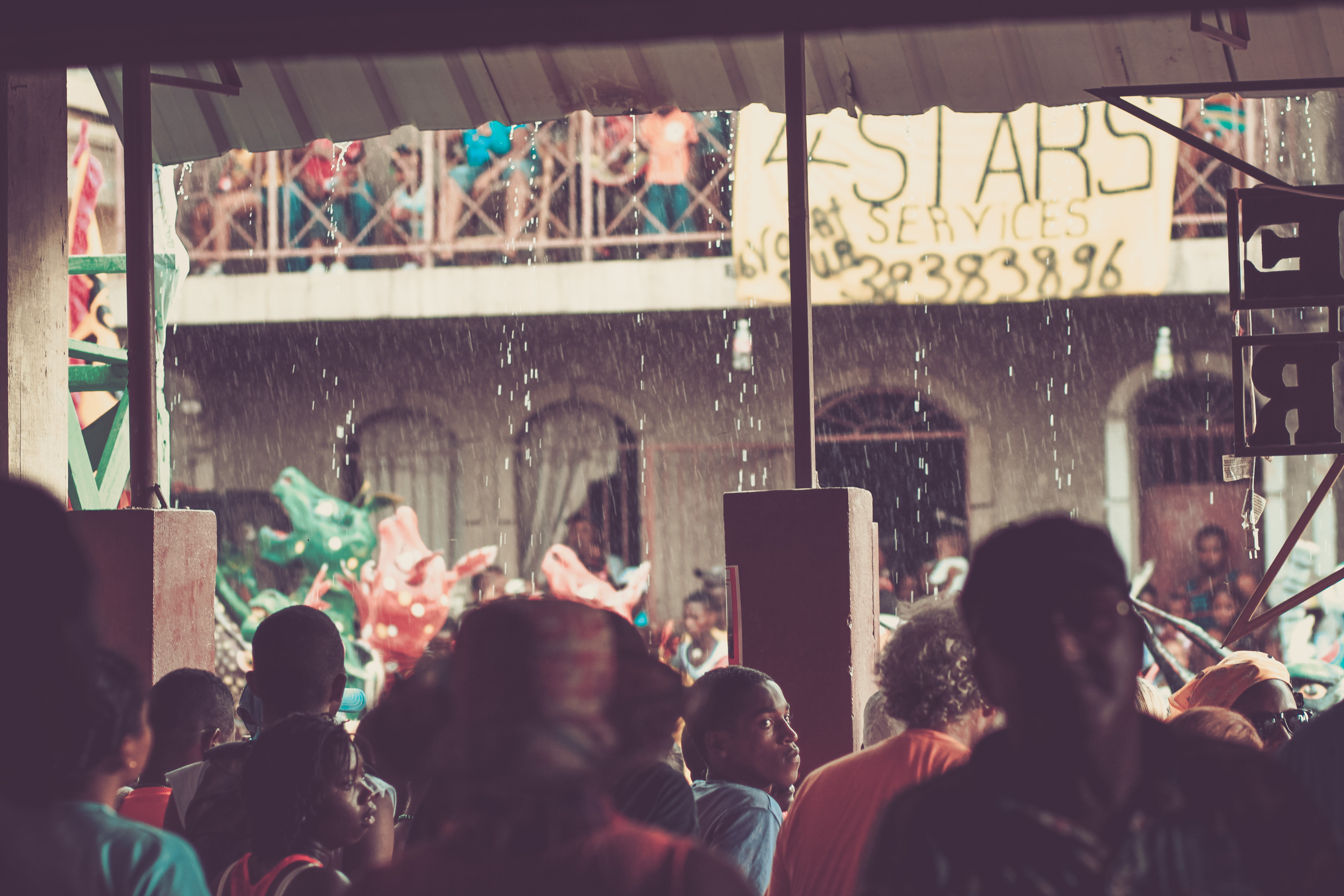
Snapshot of Carnival festivities.

== See also ==
- Haitian Carnival
