= Oreste Zamor =

22nd President of Haiti in 1914 (1861–1915)

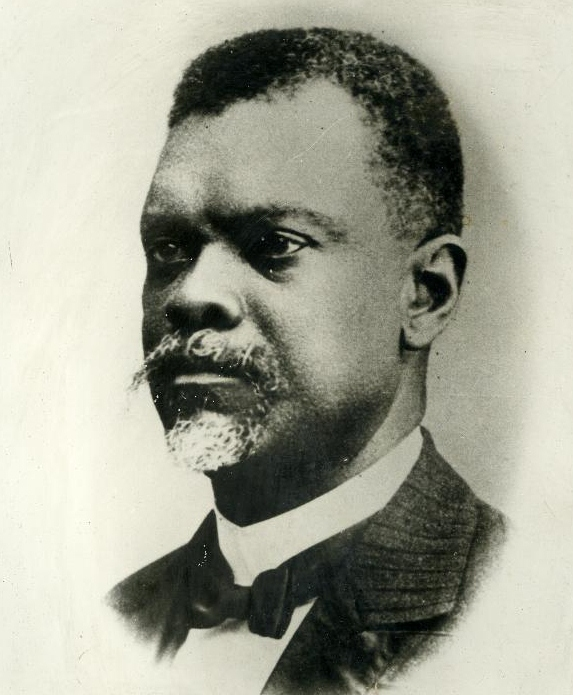

22nd President of Haiti
- In office February 8, 1914 – October 25, 1914
- Preceded by: Michel Oreste
- Succeeded by: Joseph Davilmar Théodore

Minister of War and Navy
- In office August 4, 1911 – August 16, 1911
- President: Cincinnatus Leconte
- Preceded by: Horelle Monplaisir
- Succeeded by: Horacius Limage Philippe

Personal details
- Born: Emmanuel Oreste Zamor; 1861 Hinche, Haiti
- Died: July 27, 1915 (aged 53–54) Port-au-Prince, Haiti
- Spouse(s): 1) Marie Elisabeth Protège Paul; 2) Victoire Péralte; 3) Uranie Coicou
- Occupation: Military

Emmanuel Oreste Zamor (French pronunciation: [emanɥɛl ɔʁɛst zamɔʁ]; 1861 – July 27, 1915) was a Haitian general and politician who served as the president of Haiti in 1914. He was executed the following year after being ousted in a coup.

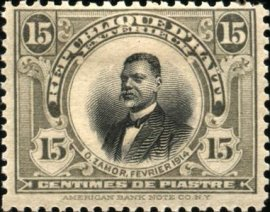
Zamor on a 1915 stamp.

== Career ==
During the Haitian civil war of 1912, Oreste Zamor and his brother Charles, both generals, supported Caimito Ramírez and harbored his troops within their districts. In 1914, the two brothers entered the war, resulting in a "short and extremely chaotic" presidency for Oreste from February 8 to October 29 of that year. He was opposed in his bid for the presidency by General Davilmar Théodore, who refused to recognize his authority, and by U.S. businessmen who had financial interests in Haiti.

The U.S. government sought American control of customs in Haiti and of the Môle-Saint-Nicolas from the Zamor government, which first demanded U.S. recognition of its legitimacy. The French and German governments opposed U.S. demands, and Secretary of State William Jennings Bryan submitted a modified proposal (the Farnham Plan, involving oversight of customs and Haitian finance and credit) to Charles Zamor. The Zamors declined to accept the plan unless the U.S. created the appearance that they were under military pressure to do so. The plan was never implemented, and civil strife in Haiti was renewed in the summer of 1914.

After four months of fighting, Oreste Zamor was ousted from the presidency and succeeded by Theodore. After his overthrow, Zamor went into exile on Curaçao. In March 1915, Oreste Zamor returned from exile by landing in the Dominican Republic, crossing the border and heading to Hinche, his residence - his entry was received with emotion.

== Arrest and execution ==
However, Zamor was arrested by the regime of President Vilbrun Guillaume Sam and taken to Port-au-Prince. Sam regime justified the arrest of the former president due to his entry without a passport and before the amnesty decree. He was executed the next year by the government of Vilbrun Guillaume Sam.

His brother in law was Charlemagne Péralte.

== See also ==
- History of Haiti#Political struggles (1843–1915)

== Notes ==
Political offices
Preceded by Michel Oreste	President of Haïti; February–October 1914	Succeeded by Joseph Davilmar Théodore
