= Republic of Haiti (1859–1957) =

Period between the Second Empire and the Duvalier family

Republic of Haiti: République d'Haïti (French); Repiblik Ayiti (Haitian Creole)
- 1859–1957
- Flag Coat of arms
- Motto: L'Union fait la force (French) "Unity Makes Strength"
- Anthem: La Dessalinienne (French); The Dessalines Song
- Capital: Port-au-Prince
- Common languages: French, Haitian Creole
- Religion: Roman Catholicism, Vodou
- Government: Unitary presidential republic
- President
  - 1859–1867 (first): Fabre Geffrard
  - 1957 (last): Antonio Thrasybule Kébreau
- Legislature: Parliament
  - Upper Chamber: Senate
  - Lower Chamber: Chamber of Deputies
- History
  - Republic declared: 15 January 1859
  - U.S. occupation: 28 July 1915 – 1 August 1934
  - UN admission: 24 October 1945
  - Duvalier takes power: 22 October 1957
- Currency: Haitian gourde
Preceded by	Succeeded by
Empire of Haiti (1849–1859)	Duvalier family

The Republic of Haiti (French: République d'Haïti; Haitian Creole: Repiblik Ayiti) was reestablished by Fabre Geffrard following the fall of Faustin I and his empire. Geffrard's rule was short-lived. In 1867, Sylvain Salnave overthrew Geffrard and ruled autocratically, leading to widespread discontent and his eventual execution in 1870. He was succeeded by General Jean-Nicolas Nissage Saget.

The late 19th century saw the rise of two political parties: the Liberal Party (PL), representing the mulatto elite, and the National Party (PN), aligned with the black majority. In a rare instance of orderly succession, Saget peacefully handed power over to National-aligned Michel Domingue. However, Domingue's presidency cut short in 1876 when the Liberals overthrew him, installing Pierre Théoma Boisrond-Canal in his place. The Liberals then became increasingly factionalized and divided, paving the way for Lysius Salomon, part of the Nationals, to assume the presidency on 1879. The presidency of Lysius Salomon (1879–1888) brought monetary reform and a cultural renaissance, yet his attempts to extend his rule sparked opposition, leading to his resignation. Haiti descended into civil war. Florvil Hyppolite (1889–1896) eventually reunified the nation, ushering in a rare period of political stability that was maintained by his successor Tirésias Simon Sam (1896–1902).

By the 20th-century however, Haiti was again engulfed in political turmoil, with the rise of a movement named Firminism, advocating for economic reform and civilian governance, clashing with traditional military elites. The rivalry between Anténor Firmin and General Pierre Nord Alexis culminated in a civil war in 1902, which ended with Alexis’s victory and Firmin’s exile. From 1911 to 1915, Haiti experienced extreme instability, with six presidents either killed or forced into exile. The United States, concerned about German influence in Haiti, intervened in 1915, beginning a 19-year occupation. During this period, the U.S. controlled Haiti’s finances, established a professional military force, and implemented infrastructure projects, but also suppressed dissent and excluded Haitians from governance. The occupation era ended in 1934.

The post-occupation era saw the rise of authoritarian leaders like Sténio Vincent and Élie Lescot, who marginalized opposition and cooperated with Rafael Trujillo, the dictator of the Dominican Republic. In 1946, Dumarsais Estimé was elected president, introducing progressive reforms, but his alienation of the military and elite led to a coup in 1950. Paul Magloire's presidency (1950–1956) was marked by natural disasters, economic mismanagement and political repression, culminating in his ouster. The republic ended in 1957 with the election of François Duvalier, whose rise to power marked the beginning of the family's reign in Haiti.

== History ==
=== Building a republic and failure ===
In 1859, Faustin I abdicated and was succeeded by Fabre Geffrard, who reestablished the republic.

Fabre Geffrard remained in power until 1867 and successfully promoted a policy of national reconciliation. His achievements included signing a concordat with the Vatican in 1860 and restoring Roman Catholic influence in Haiti, including within the education system.

In 1867, Sylvain Salnave overthrew Geffrard and assumed the presidency. Initially popular, he soon alienated many through his authoritarian tendencies; these included dissolving the National Assembly and annulling the constitution. His heavy-handed rule sparked widespread discontent, which was exploited by Generals Jean-Nicolas Nissage Saget and Michel Domingue to lead a rebellion. As defeat loomed, Salnave fled for the Dominican Republic; however, his escape attempt was thwarted by Dominican border guards, who extradited him back to Haiti. He was tried for incendiarism and murder and was executed on January 15, 1870. Saget succeeded him as the next president of Haiti.

From the 1870s to the 1890s, Haitian politics would be defined by two major political parties: the Liberal Party (PL), representing the mulatto elite, and the National Party (PN), dominated by the black majority.

In 1874, Saget peacefully transferred power to National-aligned Michel Domingue, marking one of the few times a Haitian head of state served his prescribed term and then retired. Many viewed Domingue to be a figurehead; real power laid with his nephew, Septimus Rameau, founder of the National Party.

In 1876, Domingue was overthrown by the Liberals and succeeded by Pierre Théoma Boisrond-Canal. For the remainder of the decade, the Liberals became increasingly factionalized between the "Canalistes" who supported President Canal and the "Bazelaisistes" who supported Jean Pierre Boyer-Bazelais, one of the party founders. This infighting severely weakened the Liberals and costed them the 1879 elections, bringing National Party candidate, Lysius Salomon, to the presidency.

During his presidency, Salomon enacted monetary reform, and, in 1880-1881, established the National Bank of Haiti (Banque Nationale). His presidency also saw a cultural renaissance, with Haitian art flourishing during this period. However, Salomon's efforts to prolong his tenure by amending the constitution sparked fears this would lead to a presidency-for-life, leading to significant oppositions and calls for his resignation. Facing immense pressure, Salomon ultimately resigned.

The nation then descended into civil war; stability was eventually restored under Florvil Hyppolite, who reunified Haiti and ushered in a rare period of peace. Hyppolite appointed Anténor Firmin as Minister of Finance, who reformed the country's financial systems. Firmin reorganized the banks, taxation, and regularized debt payments to France, stabilizing Haiti's reputation as a reliable debtor nation. Though initially backed by the Nationals, Hyppolite had declared himself a Liberal by the time he reached the presidency, making the divisions increasingly blurry and ultimately irrelevant.

Tirésias Simon Sam, who succeeded Hyppolite after his sudden death in March 1896, was able to maintain the peace he had started.

The final decades of the 19th century were also marked by the development of a Haitian intellectual culture. Major works of history were published in 1847 and 1865. Haitian intellectuals, led by Louis-Joseph Janvier and Anténor Firmin, engaged in a war of letters against a tide of racism and Social Darwinism that emerged during this period.

By the 20th century, new political forces had emerged, including the Firminism movement, led by Anténor Firmin. This movement emerged during the political vacuum following the resignation of President Sam after his controversial handling of the Luders Affair. Advocating for economic reform, the reduction of military influence in politics, the broader inclusion of civilian participation in governance, and a third-way that transcended the traditional Liberal and National divide, Firminism quickly gained momentum. As the elections to elect a new president approached, Firmin and General Pierre Nord Alexis emerged as the primary contenders. Those supporting Firmin were called the "Firministes" while those who supported Alexis were called the "Nordistes".

Between June and December 1902, Haiti was engulfed in civil war between these two factions. However, Firmin’s movement lacked the necessary military strength to succeed; it was ultimately crushed. Firmin was forced into exile once more and General Alexis was declared president of Haiti on December 17, 1902. There was a subsequent Firminist rebellion in 1908, but that too was crushed by Alexis.

However, by 1908, Alexis' rule had become tenuous. Amid mounting discontent over famines and natural disasters, General Antoine Simon launched a rebellion against Alexis, eventually driving him to exile later that year. He departed for Kingston, Jamaica, to jeering crowds. Overjoyed by the news, Firmin's supporters chartered a ship to return to Haiti. However, Firmin himself delayed the journey, waiting for a larger vessel to accommodate his followers and their families - a hesitation that cost him the chance to claim power.

On December 8, Antoine Simon declared himself president of Haiti after entering Port-au-Prince. Simon aligned his regime with US interests to consolidate power. Firminists in exile published scathing tracts against the government, criticizing him for compromising Haitian sovereignty and independence. One from 1910 accused Simon of “selling the country whole to the Americans” and forewarning that under U.S. domination, “independent Haitians would return to being slaves.”

In 1911, General Cincinnatus Leconte capitalized on border tensions with the Dominican Republic to lead a rebellion and launch his own bid for power, managing to rally some of Firmin's supporters towards his cause. In retaliation, Simon directed a full-scale military assault on Ouanaminthe, the rebellious eastern border town where Leconte had gathered his forces. The attack resulted in the town being burned down and the townsfolk being terrorized.

Though both Firmin and Leconte were opposed to Antoine Simon's government, their political ambitions diverged, making them rivals rather than allies. The rivalry between the two factions extended to Cap-Haïtien, where their partisans clashed.

While Simon and his ministers focused on quelling the rebellion, generals remaining in Port-au-Prince seized the opportunity to exact revenge on their political enemies and settle scores, with supporters of Firmin being summarily executed on charges of conspiracy.

On August 3, Simon fled into exile. Three days later on August 6, Leconte’s forces triumphantly entered Port-au-Prince and established control. Firmin arrived a day later on August 7 in Cap-Haïtien aboard a French steamer, the Caravelle, but his delayed landing weakened his negotiating position. Leconte immediately blocked his entry into the country, denying him the chance to assert his leadership. This denial was a humiliating blow for Firmin, and it dashed the hopes of his supporters for a potential Firmin presidency once more.

On August 8, Firmin publicly declared his retirement from politics, officially withdrawing his candidacy for the presidency and renouncing any public office, both in Haiti and abroad. In a personal farewell letter, Firmin expressed deep disappointment, lamenting that Haiti had rejected his vision of national unity and progress. This marked the end of his political dreams for Haiti. He returned to St. Thomas, where he spent the remainder of his days. Firmin died on 27 September 1911 in St. Thomas.

From 1911 to 1915, there were six presidents, each of whom was killed or forced into exile. The revolutionary armies were formed by cacos, peasant brigands from the mountains of the north, along the porous Dominican border, who were enlisted by rival political factions with promises of money to be paid after a successful revolution and an opportunity to plunder. The United States was particularly apprehensive about the role of the German community in Haiti (approximately 200 in 1910), who wielded a disproportionate amount of economic power. Germans controlled about 80% of the country's international commerce; they also owned and operated utilities in Cap Haïtien and Port-au-Prince, the main wharf and a tramway in the capital, and a railroad serving the Plaine de Cul-du-Sac.

The German community proved more willing to integrate into Haitian society than any other group of white foreigners, including the French. A number married into the nation's most prominent mulatto families, bypassing the constitutional prohibition against foreign land-ownership. They also served as the principal financiers of the nation's innumerable revolutions, floating innumerable loans-at high interest rates-to competing political factions. In an effort to limit German influence, in 1910–11, the US State Department backed a consortium of American investors, assembled by the National City Bank of New York, in securing the currency issuance concession through the National Bank of the Republic of Haiti, which replaced the prior National Bank of Haiti as the nation's only commercial bank and custodian of the government treasury.

In December 1914, the U.S. military seized the Haitian government's gold reserve, urged on by the National City Bank and the National Bank of the Republic of Haiti (which was already under foreign direction). The U.S. took the gold to National City Bank's New York City vault.

In February 1915, Vilbrun Guillaume Sam formed a dictatorship, but in July, facing a new revolt, whom he massacred 167 political opponents, and was lynched by a mob in Port-au-Prince.

=== United States occupation ===
In 1915, Philippe Sudré Dartiguenave was appointed by US authorities to the Presidency of Haiti. Martial law was declared, and persisted until 1929. A treaty, which allowed the US government complete control over cabinet positions and Haiti's finances, was passed by the legislature in November 1915. The treaty also established the Gendarmerie d'Haïti (Haitian Constabulatory Force), Haiti's first professional military. Dartiguenave dissolved the legislature in 1917 after its members refused to approve a new constitution. A referendum subsequently approved the constitution, which allowed foreigners to own land, something which had been forbidden by Haitian law since independence in 1804.

The US occupation was a costly period in terms of human life. A revolt by disgruntled citizens was put down in 1918, with an estimated 2,000 killed. White foreigners, many with deep racial prejudices, dominated public policy, which angered the historically dominant Mulattos. However, Haiti's infrastructure, including roads, telephone lines, and plumbing, were repaired. Lighthouses, schools, hospitals, and harbors were built. Louis Borno replaced Dartiguenave as president in 1922, after he was forced out of office. He ruled without a legislature until elections were permitted in 1930. This newly formed legislature elected Sténio Vincent, a mulatto, as president.

By 1930, Haiti had become a liability to the United States. A congressional inquiry, known as the Forbes Commission, exposed many human rights violations, and while it praised improvements in Haitian society, it criticized the exclusion of Haitians from positions of authority. By August 1932, with the election of Franklin D. Roosevelt as US President, American troops withdrew and authority was formally transferred to local police and army officials.

=== Post-occupation, World War II and collapse ===
Vincent took advantage of the stability to gain dictatorial power. Vincent expanded his economic authority by referendum, and in 1935, he forced a new constitution through the legislature. This constitution gave him power to dissolve the legislature and reorganize the judiciary at will, as well as the power to appoint senators. He also brutally oppressed political opposition.

Rafael Leónidas Trujillo had come to power in 1930 in the neighboring Dominican Republic. In 1937, Trujillo attacked the border with Haiti, his forces killing an estimated 20,000 Haitians. This attack Vincent interpreted as an attempted coup against himself, and thus he purged the military of all officers suspected of disloyalty. Many of these later joined the Dominican military.

In 1941, Élie Lescot, a mulatto who was an experienced and competent government official, was elected as president. Despite high expectations, his tenure paralleled Vincent's in its brutality and marginalization of opposition. He declared war on the Axis powers during World War II, and used this as an excuse to censor the press and repress his opponents. Lescot also maintained a clandestine cooperation with Trujillo, which undermined his already-nonexistent popularity. In January 1946, after Lescot jailed editors of a Marxist newspaper, protests broke out among government workers, teachers, and business owners. Lescot resigned, and a military junta, the Comité Exécutif Militaire (Executive Military Committee), assumed power.

Haiti elected a legislature in May 1946, and after two rounds of voting, Dumarsais Estimé, a black cabinet minister, was elected president. He operated under a new constitution which expanded schools, established rural farming cooperatives, and raised salaries of civil servants. These early successes, however, were undermined by his personal ambition, and his alienation of the military and elite led to a coup in 1950, which reinstalled the military junta. Direct elections, the first in Haiti's history, were held in October 1950, and Paul Magloire, an elite black Colonel in the military, was elected. Hurricane Hazel hit the island in 1954, which devastated the nation's infrastructure and economy. Hurricane relief was inadequately distributed and misspent, and Magloire jailed opponents and shut down newspapers. After refusing to step down after his term ended, a general strike shut down Port-au-Prince's economy, and Magloire fled, leaving the government in a state of chaos. When elections were finally organized, François Duvalier, a rural doctor, was elected, on a platform of activism on behalf of Haiti's poor. His opponent, however, Louis Déjoie, was a mulatto and the scion of a prominent family. Duvalier scored a decisive victory at the polls. His followers took two-thirds of the legislature's lower house and all of the seats in the Senate.

== After the Republic ==
The Duvalier family (French: Dynastie des Duvalier) was an autocratic hereditary dictatorship in Haiti that lasted almost 29 years, from 1957 until 1986, spanning the rule of the father-and-son duo Dr. François Duvalier (Papa Doc) and Jean-Claude Duvalier (Baby Doc).

== See also ==
- History of Haiti
