= List of heads of state of Haiti =

This article lists the heads of state of Haiti since the beginning of the Haitian Revolution in 1791. Full independence of Haiti was declared in 1804.

Between 1806 and 1820 Haiti was divided between the northern State, renamed Kingdom in 1811, and the southern Republic. Between 1822 and 1844 the reunified Republic of Haiti ruled over the entire island of Hispaniola, during the Haitian occupation of Santo Domingo.

== Saint-Domingue (1791–1804) ==
No.	Portrait	Name (Birth–Death)	Term of office			Party	Title(s)
No.	Portrait	Name (Birth–Death)	Took office	Left office	Time in office	Party	Title(s)
		Toussaint Louverture (1743–1803)	21 August 1791	6 May 1802	10 years, 258 days	Independent	Leader of the Haitian Revolution (21 August 1791 – 6 May 1802) Lieutenant Governor of Saint-Domingue (1797 – 7 July 1801) Governor-General for Life of the entire island of Hispaniola (7 July 1801 – 6 May 1802)
Post vacant (6 May 1802 – 1 January 1804)
1		Jean-Jacques Dessalines (1758–1806)	1 January 1804	22 September 1804	265 days	Independent	Governor-General of Haiti

== First Empire of Haiti (Monarchy of Jacques I, 1804–1806) ==
Portrait	Name (Birth–Death)	Reign			Coronation	Royal house	Coat of arms
Portrait	Name (Birth–Death)	Reign start	Reign ended	Duration	Coronation	Royal house	Coat of arms
	Jacques I (1758–1806)	22 September 1804	17 October 1806	2 years, 25 days	8 October 1804	Dessalines	

== Divided Haiti (1806–1820) ==
=== North Haiti (1806–1820) ===
==== State of Haiti (1806–1811) ====
No.	Portrait	Name (Birth–Death)	Term of office			Party	Title(s)
No.	Portrait	Name (Birth–Death)	Took office	Left office	Time in office	Party	Title(s)
2		Henri Christophe (1767–1820)	17 October 1806	28 March 1811	4 years, 162 days	Independent	Provisional Chief of the Haitian Government (17 October 1806 – 17 February 1807) President (17 February 1807 – 28 March 1811) (Note: Rule limited to the northern part of Haiti.)

==== Kingdom of Haiti (Monarchy of Henry I, 1811–1820) ====
Portrait	Name (Birth–Death)	Reign			Coronation	Royal house	Coat of arms
Portrait	Name (Birth–Death)	Reign start	Reign ended	Duration	Coronation	Royal house	Coat of arms
	Henry I (1767–1820)	28 March 1811	8 October 1820	9 years, 194 days	2 June 1811	Christophe	

== Republic of Haiti (1806–1849) ==
No.	Portrait	Name (Birth–Death)	Term of office			Party	Title(s)
No.	Portrait	Name (Birth–Death)	Took office	Left office	Time in office	Party	Title(s)
South Haiti (1806–1820)
3		Alexandre Pétion (1770–1818)	17 October 1806	29 March 1818	11 years, 163 days	Independent	President (17 October 1806 – 9 October 1816) President for Life (9 October 1816 – 29 March 1818) (Note: Rule limited to the southern part of Haiti.)
4		Jean-Pierre Boyer (1776–1850)	30 March 1818	18 October 1820	2 years, 202 days	Independent	President for Life (Note: United the northern Kingdom and the southern Republic in 1820.)
Reunified Haiti (1820–1849)
(4)		Jean-Pierre Boyer (1776–1850)	18 October 1820	13 February 1843	22 years, 118 days	Independent	President for Life
5		Charles Rivière-Hérard (1789–1850)	4 April 1843	3 May 1844	1 year, 29 days	Independent	President
6		Philippe Guerrier (1757–1845)	3 May 1844	15 April 1845	347 days	Independent	President
7		Jean-Louis Pierrot (1761–1857)	16 April 1845	1 March 1846 (Note: Deposed on 1 March, accepted on 24 March.)	319 days	Independent	President
8		Jean-Baptiste Riché (1780–1847)	1 March 1846	27 February 1847	363 days	Independent	President
9		Faustin Soulouque (1782–1867)	2 March 1847	26 August 1849	2 years, 177 days	Independent	President

== Second Empire of Haiti (Monarchy of Faustin I, 1849–1859) ==
Portrait	Name (Birth–Death)	Reign			Coronation	Royal house	Coat of arms
Portrait	Name (Birth–Death)	Reign start	Reign ended	Duration	Coronation	Royal house	Coat of arms
	Faustin I (1782–1867)	26 August 1849	15 January 1859	9 years, 142 days	18 April 1852	Soulouque	

== Republic of Haiti (1859–1957) ==
Status

Acting president

No.	Portrait	Name (Birth–Death)	Elected	Term of office			Party	Title(s)
No.	Portrait	Name (Birth–Death)	Elected	Took office	Left office	Time in office	Party	Title(s)
10		Fabre Geffrard (1806–1878)	—	15 January 1859	13 March 1867	8 years, 57 days	Independent	President
—		Jean-Nicolas Nissage Saget (1810–1880)	—	13 March 1867	4 May 1867	52 days	Independent	Provisional President
11		Sylvain Salnave (1827–1870)	—	4 May 1867	27 December 1869	2 years, 237 days	Independent	President
—		Provisional Government	—	27 December 1869	20 March 1870	83 days	Independent	(Note: A gouvernement provisoire took over after Salnave, composed of Jean-Nicolas Nissage Saget, Michel Domingue, and Pierre Nord Alexis.)
12		Jean-Nicolas Nissage Saget (1810–1880)	—	20 March 1870	14 May 1874	4 years, 55 days	Liberal Party	President
—		Council of Secretaries of State	—	14 May 1874	14 June 1874	31 days	Independent	Council of Secretaries of State
13		Michel Domingue (1813–1877)	—	14 June 1874	15 April 1876	1 year, 306 days	National Party	President
14		Pierre Théoma Boisrond-Canal (1832–1905)	—	23 April 1876	17 July 1879	3 years, 85 days	Liberal Party	Provisional President (23 April 1876 – 17 July 1876) President (17 July 1876 – 17 July 1879)
—		Public Order Committee	—	17 July 1879	26 July 1879	9 days	Independent	(Note: A Committee took over the government after Boisrond-Canal's departure. It was composed of senator Darius Denis as president and deputy Demesvar Delorme as vice-president.)
—		Joseph Lamothe (?–1891)	—	26 July 1879	3 October 1879	69 days	Independent	Provisional President
—		Florvil Hyppolite (1828–1896)	—	3 October 1879	26 October 1879	23 days	National Party	Provisional President (Note: Provisional government: Florvil Hyppolite, Richelieu Duperval, Seide Thélémaque, Tirésias Simon Sam and Lysius Salomon.)
15		Lysius Salomon (1815–1888)	—	26 October 1879	10 August 1888	8 years, 289 days	National Party	President
—		Pierre Théoma Boisrond-Canal (1832–1905)	—	10 August 1888	16 October 1888	67 days	Liberal Party	Provisional President
16		François Denys Légitime (1841–1935)	—	16 October 1888	23 August 1889	311 days	Liberal Party	President
—		Monpoint Jeune (1830–1905)	—	23 August 1889	17 October 1889	55 days	Independent	Provisional President
17		Florvil Hyppolite (1828–1896)	—	17 October 1889	24 March 1896	6 years, 159 days	National Party	President
18		Tirésias Simon Sam (1835–1916)	—	31 March 1896	12 May 1902	6 years, 42 days	National Party	President
—		Pierre Théoma Boisrond-Canal (1832–1905)	—	14 May 1902	17 December 1902	217 days	Liberal Party	President of the Committee of Public Safety (14 May 1902 – 26 May 1902) Provisional President (26 May 1902 – 17 December 1902)
19		Pierre Nord Alexis (1820–1910)	—	17 December 1902	2 December 1908	5 years, 351 days	Military	President
—		Commission for Public Order	—	2 December 1908	6 December 1908	4 days	Independent	(Note: Members: Louis-Auguste Boisrond-Canal, Prudent, Grandjean Guillaume, Maximilien Laforest, Michel Oreste and Auguste Bonamy.)
20		François C. Antoine Simon (1843–1923)	—	6 December 1908	2 August 1911	2 years, 239 days	Liberal Party	President
21		Cincinnatus Leconte (1854–1912)	—	15 August 1911	8 August 1912	359 days	National Party	President (Note: Great-Grandson of Jean-Jacques Dessalines (Emperor of Haiti 1804–1806).)
22		Tancrède Auguste (1856–1913)	—	8 August 1912	2 May 1913	267 days	National Party	President
23		Michel Oreste (1859–1918)	—	12 May 1913	27 January 1914	260 days	Independent	President
—		Edmond Polynice (1855–1915)	—	27 January 1914	8 February 1914	12 days	Military	Provisional President
24		Oreste Zamor (1861–1915)	—	8 February 1914	29 October 1914	263 days	Military	President
—		Edmond Polynice (1855–1915)	—	29 October 1914	6 November 1914	8 days	Military	Provisional President
25		Joseph Davilmar Théodore (1847–1917)	—	7 November 1914	22 February 1915	107 days	Military	President
26		Vilbrun Guillaume Sam (1859–1915)	—	25 February 1915	28 July 1915	153 days	Military	President (Note: Son of Tirésias Simon Sam (President of Haiti 1896–1902). Also the inspiration for Eugene O'Neill's The Emperor Jones.)
—		Revolutionary Committee	—	28 July 1915	11 August 1915	14 days	Independent	(Note: Members: Charles de Delva, Charles Zamor, Edmond Polynice, Léon Nau, Ermane Robin, Eribert Saint-Vil Nöel and Samson Monpoint.)
27		Philippe Sudré Dartiguenave (1863–1926)	—	12 August 1915	15 May 1922	6 years, 276 days	Independent	President (Note: Served under the United States occupation.)
28		Louis Borno (1865–1942)	—	15 May 1922	15 May 1930	8 years	Independent	President
29		Louis Eugène Roy (1861–1939)	—	15 May 1930	18 November 1930	187 days	Independent	President
30		Sténio Vincent (1874–1959)	—	18 November 1930	15 May 1941	10 years, 178 days	Independent	President (Note: Served under the United States occupation until 1 August 1934.)
31		Élie Lescot (1883–1974)	—	15 May 1941	11 January 1946 (Deposed)	4 years, 241 days	Liberal Party	President
32		Franck Lavaud (1903–1986)	—	11 January 1946	16 August 1946	217 days	Military	Chairman of the Military Executive Committee
33		Dumarsais Estimé (1900–1953)	1946	16 August 1946	10 May 1950 (Deposed)	3 years, 267 days	Liberal Party	President
34		Franck Lavaud (1903–1986)	—	10 May 1950	6 December 1950	210 days	Military	Chairman of the Government Junta
35		Paul Magloire (1907–2001)	1950	6 December 1950	12 December 1956	6 years, 6 days	Peasant Worker Movement	President
36		Joseph Nemours Pierre-Louis (1900–1966)	—	12 December 1956	3 February 1957	53 days	Independent	Provisional President
37		Franck Sylvain (1909–1987)	—	7 February 1957	2 April 1957	54 days	Independent	Provisional President
—		Léon Cantave (1910–1967)	—	2 April 1957	6 April 1957	4 days	Military	Acting President
—		Executive Government Council	—	6 April 1957	20 May 1957	44 days	Independent	Executive Government Council
—		Léon Cantave (1910–1967)	—	20 May 1957	25 May 1957	5 days	Military	Acting President
—		Daniel Fignolé (1913–1986)	—	25 May 1957	14 June 1957	20 days	Peasant Worker Movement	Provisional President
38		Antonio Thrasybule Kébreau (1909–1963)	—	14 June 1957	22 October 1957	130 days	Military	Chairman of the Military Council

== Republic of Haiti (Duvalier family rule, 1957–1986) ==
Symbols

^{P} Presidential referendum
^{C} Constitutional referendum

No.	Portrait	Name (Birth–Death)	Elected	Term of office			Party	Title(s)
No.	Portrait	Name (Birth–Death)	Elected	Took office	Left office	Time in office	Party	Title(s)
39		François Duvalier (1907–1971)	1957; 1961^{[P]} 1964^{[C]}	22 October 1957	21 April 1971†	13 years, 181 days	National Unity Party	President (22 October 1957 – 22 June 1964) President for Life (22 June 1964 – 21 April 1971)
40		Jean-Claude Duvalier (1951–2014)	1971^{[C]} 1985^{[C]}	21 April 1971 (Note: Succeeded his father as President for Life.)	7 February 1986 (Note: Deposed in the Anti-Duvalier protest movement.)	14 years, 292 days	National Unity Party	President for Life

== Republic of Haiti (1986–present) ==
Symbols

^{I} Indirect election

Status

Acting president

No.	Portrait	Name (Birth–Death)	Elected	Term of office			Party	Title(s)
No.	Portrait	Name (Birth–Death)	Elected	Took office	Left office	Time in office	Party	Title(s)
41		Henri Namphy (1932–2018)	—	7 February 1986	7 February 1988	2 years	Military	President of the National Council of Government
42		Leslie Manigat (1930–2014)	1988	7 February 1988	20 June 1988 (Deposed)	134 days	Rally of Progressive National Democrats	President
(41)		Henri Namphy (1932–2018)	—	20 June 1988	17 September 1988 (Deposed)	89 days	Military	President
43		Prosper Avril (born 1937)	—	17 September 1988	10 March 1990	1 year, 236 days	Military	President
—		Hérard Abraham (1940–2022)	—	10 March 1990	13 March 1990	3 days	Military	Acting President
—		Ertha Pascal-Trouillot (born 1943)	—	13 March 1990	7 February 1991	331 days	Independent	Provisional President
44		Jean-Bertrand Aristide (born 1953)	1990–91	7 February 1991	29 September 1991 (Deposed)	234 days	Struggling People's Organization	President
—		Raoul Cédras (born 1949)	—	29 September 1991	8 October 1991	9 days	Military	Commander-in-Chief of the Armed Forces (Note: De facto leader of Haiti (29 September 1991 – 12 October 1994).)
—		Joseph Nérette (1924–2007)	—	8 October 1991	19 June 1992	255 days	Independent	Provisional President
—		Council of Ministers; Prime Minister: Marc Bazin (1932–2010)	—	19 June 1992	15 June 1993	361 days	Movement for the Instauration of Democracy in Haiti	Council of Ministers
(44)		Jean-Bertrand Aristide (born 1953)	—	15 June 1993	12 May 1994	331 days	Struggling People's Organization	President (Note: In exile, but recognized in Haiti.)
—		Émile Jonassaint (1913–1995)	—	12 May 1994	12 October 1994	153 days	Independent	Provisional President (Note: De facto president of Haiti under the military junta (15 June 1993 – 12 May 1994).)
(44)		Jean-Bertrand Aristide (born 1953)	—	12 October 1994	7 February 1996	1 year, 118 days	Struggling People's Organization	President (Note: Served under the United States occupation until 31 March 1995.)
45		René Préval (1943–2017)	1995	7 February 1996	7 February 2001	5 years	Fanmi Lavalas	President
(44)		Jean-Bertrand Aristide (born 1953)	2000	7 February 2001	29 February 2004 (Deposed)	3 years, 22 days	Fanmi Lavalas	President
—		Boniface Alexandre (1936–2023)	—	29 February 2004	14 May 2006	2 years, 75 days	Independent	Provisional President
(45)		René Préval (1943–2017)	2006	14 May 2006	14 May 2011	5 years	Lespwa (until 2009)	President
		René Préval (1943–2017)	2006	14 May 2006	14 May 2011	5 years	Inite	President
46		Michel Martelly (born 1961)	2010–11	14 May 2011	7 February 2016	4 years, 269 days	Repons Peyizan	President
—		Council of Ministers; Prime Minister: Evans Paul (born 1955)	—	7 February 2016	14 February 2016	7 days	Democratic Alliance Party	Council of Ministers
—		Jocelerme Privert (born 1953)	2016 (Feb)^{[I]}	14 February 2016	7 February 2017	359 days	Inite	Provisional President (Note: Presidential term expired on 14 June 2016.)
47		Jovenel Moïse (1968–2021)	2016 (Nov)	7 February 2017	7 July 2021† (Note: Assassinated.)	4 years, 150 days	Haitian Tèt Kale Party	President
—		Council of Ministers; Acting Prime Minister: Claude Joseph	—	7 July 2021	20 July 2021	13 days	Independent	Council of Ministers
—		Council of Ministers; Acting Prime Minister: Ariel Henry (born 1949)	—	20 July 2021	24 April 2024	2 years, 279 days	Independent	Council of Ministers
—		Transitional Presidential Council; Chairman: Edgard Leblanc Fils (born 1955)	—	30 April 2024	7 October 2024	160 days	Struggling People's Organization	Transitional Presidential Council
—		Transitional Presidential Council; Chairman: Leslie Voltaire (born 1949)	—	7 October 2024	7 March 2025	151 days	Fanmi Lavalas	Transitional Presidential Council
—		Transitional Presidential Council; Chairman: Fritz Jean (born 1956)	—	7 March 2025	7 August 2025	153 days	Inite	Transitional Presidential Council
—		Transitional Presidential Council; Chairman: Laurent Saint-Cyr (born ?)	—	7 August 2025	7 February 2026	184 days	Independent	Transitional Presidential Council
—		Council of Ministers; Acting Prime Minister: Alix Didier Fils-Aimé (born 1971)	—	7 February 2026	Incumbent	251 days	Independent	Council of Ministers

== See also ==
- History of Haiti
- Saint-Domingue
  - List of colonial governors of Saint-Domingue
- Politics of Haiti
- President of Haiti
- Vice President of Haiti
- Prime Minister of Haiti
  - List of prime ministers of Haiti
- List of monarchs of Haiti
- List of Haitian royal consorts
