= National Party (Haiti) =

National Party Parti National
- Haitian Creyole name: Pati Nasyonal
- Abbreviation: PN
- Founder: Septimus Rameau (Note: Demesvar Delorme may have co-founded the National Party.)
- Founded: 1870s
- Ideology: Economic nationalism Noirism (disputed); Eurocentrism (in practice); Nationalism; Populism; Progressivism; Republicanism
- Slogan: "The greatest good for the greatest number"
- Main opponent: Liberal Party

The National Party (Parti National; PN) was an economically nationalist majority Black Haitian political party in Haiti. It was founded in the early 1870s (Note: The exact date of the National Party's founding is unclear. It is believed to have been created during the presidency of Nissage Saget (1869–1874) and after the establishment of the Liberal Party.) by Septimus Rameau (Note: Demesvar Delorme may have co-founded the National Party with Rameau from the north, though this remains unclear.) during a time of political reorganization following the civil war of the 1860s. They stood in direct opposition to the Liberal Party, which was dominated by the Mulatto elite. Both of these parties are considered as the nation's first modern and nationwide political parties.

During its early years, the National Party struggled, as its rival, the Liberal Party, held a commanding majority in parliament during the presidency of Nissage Saget (1869–1874). However, the National Party managed to undermine their dominance through strategic politicking, including a parliamentary boycott. This allowed the Nationals' candidate, Michel Domingue, to become president in 1874. Domingue's presidency was largely ceremonial, and real power laid with his nephew, Rameau. As Domingue's administration became increasingly despotic, many Liberals fled the country.

In 1876, these exiled Liberals mounted a successful invasion in Jacmel to reclaim control, overthrowing President Domingue and installing Boisrond-Canal as provisional president. Canal would later assume full presidential authority. The Liberal Party soon split into two: the "Canalistes" who supported President Canal and the "Bazelaisistes" who supported Jean-Pierre Boyer Bazelais, one of the founders of the Liberal Party. This infighting proved disastrous and allowed the Nationals to regain power with the election of Lysius Salomon in 1879.

Under Salomon's leadership, the Nationals reached the height of their influence and dominated until 1888, surviving many violent attempts to oust them, including the Liberal Insurrection of 1883, during which Boyer-Bazelais was killed.

After Salomon's term was extended through a constitutional amendment, widespread unrest led to a separatist movement in the north, led by General Seide Thelemanque. Salomon resigned under pressure, and F.D. Légitime assumed control of the south. When Thelemanque died, Florvil Hyppolite succeeded him and eventually led a rebellion to reunify Haiti in 1889. Although Hyppolite had fought with National backing, he declared himself a Liberal by the time he assumed office, making the divisions increasingly blurry and irrelevant.

Ultimately, there is no consensus among Haitian writers on whether or not the Liberal Party and the National Party truly survived the deaths of their respective leaders – Boyer-Bazelais in 1883 and Salomon in 1888.

== Ideology ==
The Nationals, also known as Nationalists, was predominantly associated with the Black Haitian majority and promoted a program of economic nationalism. (Note: Many Nationals took interest in certain trade protections and land distribution.) They opposed the traditional domination of the Mulatto elite and the elitism of the Liberals. As historian David Nicholls argues, the rivalry between the National Party and the Liberal Party was fundamentally rooted in racial divisions. Poet Emmanuel Edouard articulated these tensions, stating:

"Every Haitian knows that in Haiti the words 'Liberal Party' signify 'Mulatto party,' [a] party which desires the preponderance of mulattoes in the government of the country... Everyone knows that the words 'National Party' mean 'black party,' [a] party which desires... the preponderance of blacks, the immense majority of Haitians, in the conduct of public affairs."

Within the National Party, Nicholls identifies a faction known as the noiristes, sometimes called "ultranationals" or piquets doctrinaires. This group, led by intellectuals such as Louis Joseph Janvier, aimed to reintrepret Haitian history through a "Black" lens, pinning the country's struggles on the selfishness of Mulatto politicians, who they argued prioritized their own interests over national unity, and to the weakness of black leaders, who engaged in la politique de doublure (serving as figureheads while others held real power).

However, critics of Nicholls' analysis, such as historian Chelsea Stieber, argue that this characterization imposes a teleological framework that distorts historical reality. They assert that Nicholls' association of the Nationals with noiriste ideology and the Liberals with Mulatto elites projects the color-centric politics of the 20th century, particularly the Duvalier era, backward onto the 19th century. According to Stieber, the term "noiriste" itself does not appear in the discourse of the time.

Despite being predominantly Black, the National Party retained an elitist character, representing the interests of the rural Black landowning class. Its membership composed of a coalition of landowners, planters, military leaders, and intellectuals—the rural bourgeoisie of Haiti. While these Black elites had interests distinct from the broader impoverished masses, they still relied on their support to further their political ambitions. To garner such support, they appealed directly to them by emphasizing racial solidarity and framing the struggle as one of blacks against the dominance of the mulatto elite. They used the color issue as a unifying rallying point, best encapsulated by their motto "The greatest good for the greatest number".

The association of the Nationals with Noirism—an ideology focused on the empowerement of Haiti's Black majority and promotion of African heritage—as argued by later 20th-century Noirist writers, is subject to debate. Noirist writers like Ulrich Saint Louis and Leslie Manigat argue that the National Party "advocated the reconnecting of Haiti to a black civilization". In other words, "the return of Haiti to Africa", but Nicholls disputes this. He contends that prominent Nationals, including Lysius Salomon, aimed to align Haiti culturally and politically with European civilization, particularly the French model.

Salomon reportedly expressed these sentiments to the French minister in Port-au-Prince, stating, "Our origin, our language, our instincts incline us towards you; it is France—honest, loyal, and generous—whom we prefer to all the other nations."

This eurocentric view was further echoed by National intellectuals such as Louis-Joseph Janvie, who supported the idea of borrowing the legal and constitutional frameworks of the British and the French rather than from the African traditions. Similarly, Demesvar Delorme, a leader of the Nationals, reportedly expressed to Salomon the party's ambition to build a new societal order, grounded in European civilization: "We have the hope and the sincere intention of building on the ruins which we displace, a regular and new order of things, on the model of the civilizations which exist in Europe."

While the Nationals acknowledged Haiti's African roots biologically speaking, they viewed European civilization as the gold standard of progress. This was evident in Salomon's administration, which invited French teachers to Haiti and promoted the use of the French language as a cultural and intellectual benchmark.

== Background ==
Jean-Pierre Boyer's long regime saw color divisions intensify as the concentration of power and privileges among the Mulattos under him fostered resentment within Black Haitians, culminating into backlash which resulted in the rise of Faustin Soulouque, a Black military leader who declared himself emperor in 1849 and used his reign to consolidate power in favor of the Black majority. However, Soulouque's imperial ambitions collapsed in 1859, leading to his abdication, the reestablishment of a republican government under Fabre Geffrard, and the return of the Mulatto elite to political power. Whatever goodwill he gained through restoring the republic gradually dissipated in the repression of opposition that his regime later carried on.

In 1867, Fabre Geffrard's government was overthrown by Sylvian Salnave, a charismatic and initially popular figure. However, his reign soon emulated the autocratic tendecies of his predecessors, dissolving the National Assembly and nullifying the constitution. These dictatorial actions of his provoked widespread dissent across the nation. General Jean-Nicolas Nissage Saget led an insurgency in the north, while others too capitalized on the chaos; General Normil Dubois formed the Constitutional Army of the South and Michel Domingue became president of the Meridional State of the South around Les Cayes.

By 1868, Haiti had splintered into three: Salnave's government, Saget's northern republic, and the southern forces.

By 1869, with opposition forces moving in on the capital of Port-au-Prince, the defeat of Salnave was all but certain. In spectacular fashion, Salnave blew up the presidential palace as he fled the capital to the Dominican Republic. However, he was captured by Dominican frontier guards loyal to General José María Cabral, a supporter of Saget. On December 19, Salnave was turned over to Haitian authorities. He was tried on charges of incendiarism and murder and was executed on January 15, 1870.

The destruction of the presidential palace symbolized the end of conflict over the form of government (republic vs monarchy/empire). Out of the 1868–1869 crisis emerged a new political paradigm, one characterized by factional divides within a republican framework. By 1869, the ideological debate was no longer about what type of government Haiti should adopt but instead about how the republic should be governed. This era of party-based politics was marked by the polarization between the Black and Mulatto elites manifesting into two political parties: the predominantly Mulatto "Liberal Party" and the preponderantly Black "National Party". The both of them are considered as Haiti's first modern and nationwide political parties.

Michel-Roplh Troulliot argues that during this period, "Haiti came as close as it ever has to an effective parliamentary experience". Though it should not be mistaken that this was a period of calm. Civil wars and insurrections still persisted throughout this era.

== History ==
Shortly after the Liberal Party was created in 1870, Cayenne deputy Septimus Rameau founded the National Party, drawing on the populist politics that Lysius Salomon and others had promoted in Les Cayes since the 1840s.

During the early 1870s, the Liberal Party dominated Haitian politics, relegating the Nationals to a secondary role. Under the presidency of Nissage Saget (1869–1874), they managed to push through much of their Liberal agenda.

By 1873 however, President Saget was nearing the end of his prescribed term. Many believed Saget would help his ally, Michel Domingue, to succeed him as president. This prospect concerned the Liberals, as Domingue had a brutal record during the civil war in the 1860s, and they feared he would rule as a despot and ignore the constitution, potentially even plunging the country back into war. Thus the Liberals rallied behind Monplaisir Pierre as their alternative candidate.

When legislative elections were held in January, Domingue's supporters within the National Party failed to secure a majority in the House of Deputies. With the majority of the House under the Liberals, they elected Boyer-Bazelais as president of the chamber. In protest, Domingue's faction, led by Septimus Rameau, withdrew from the House altogether, causing a constitutional crisis and paralyzing legislative proceedings.

Despite the deadlock, the remaining members of the House elected Georges Brice, a Liberal, as the new president of the House. President Saget however refused to recognize the election, citing a constitutional requirement that two-thirds of the entire membership be present for such decisions to be considered valid.

By May 1874, the Liberals proposed extending President Saget's term beyond its expiration. Nevertheless, President Saget chose to step down as planned, handing over power to the Council of Secretaries of State. He was the first president to complete his term in office and not press for an extension.

The Council of Secretaries of State appointed Michel Domingue as the commander-in-chief of the Haitian army. Domingue and his advisers bypassed the established constitutional processes by calling for a constituent assembly on June 10 that would supersede the National Assembly and essentially rubber-stamp his presidency. Under coercion, the constituent assembly unanimously voted to name Domingue as president of the republic.

Although Domingue was president, real power laid with his nephew, Septimus Rameau, who served as vice president of the Council of Secretaries of State. The new government, as feared, pushed through constitutional changes to double the presidential term from four years to eight years and granted the president the right to dissolve both chambers of the National Assembly.

With the increasingly despotic rule of President Domingue, many Liberals chose to flee Haiti, seeking refuge in Kingston (Jamaica) and St. Thomas (then part of the Danish West Indies).

=== 1875 – 1879 ===
During Agriculture Day festivities in 1875, Domingue's forces seized on the opportunity to eliminate the remaining leadership of the Liberal Party still in Haiti – Monplaisir Pierre, Georges Brice, and Boisrond Canal. Georges Brice was murdered in a surprise attack while Boisrond-Canal managed to escape with his family to Kingston.

In 1876, exiled Liberals in Jamaica and St. Thomas organized an invasion of Jacmel that killed many, including the founder of the National Party, Rameau. The Liberal Party successfully overthrew President Domingue and installed Pierre Théoma Boisrond-Canal as president of a provisional government.

Throughout the remainder of the 1870s, the Liberal Party became increasingly divided, splitting into two factions driven more by personal rivalries rather than ideological difference. One faction was led by Boisrond-Canal (Canalistes), while the other by one of the party's founders, Boyer-Bazelais (Bazelaisistes). President Canal, a Liberal early on, began supporting the National Party, effectively betraying his own party. During legislative elections, President Canal attempted to prevent a potential Bazelais presidency by instructing the military to back National candidates. Hannibal Price, a Liberal deputy, wrote "Canal preferred to betray the party who had been his friends sooner than to see his rival succeed to the Presidency."

This power struggle culminated into violence as rival politicians clashed in the streets of Port-au-Prince. Government forces, deeply divided, turned against one another; the National Guard, supportive of the Liberals, fought against the army, which was still loyal to the government. Government troops deployed a cannon and attacked Boyer-Bazelais' house. Civil disorder in Port-au-Prince inspired uprisings across the north, northwest, and Artibonite regions. By late July 1879, President Canal was overthrown and Bazelais was ultimately forced into exile in Jamaica. A provisional government, led by General Joseph Lamothe, was formed to maintain order. Lamothe's government was hostile to the Liberal Party, barring its leaders from elections. Heriston Hérissé was the most prominent candidate within the provisional regime. In response, the Nationals of Lysius Salomon decided to topple the Lamothe-Hérissé regime, culminating in General Richelieu Duperval's coup on October 3, which installed a new provisional government.

On October 23, the National Assembly unanimously elected General Louis Étienne Félicité Lysius Salomon, the National candidate, president for a seven-year term.

=== 1879–1888 ===
Under President Salomon, the Nationals were in power for nearly a decade, from 1879 to 1888. Though their rule was marred by violent attempts to unseat them, the most notable being the failed 1883 Liberal uprising which began in Miragoâne and was led by Boyer Bazelais. The uprising came about following the passage of Salomon's controversial 1883 land reform law.

Over a hundred Liberal partisans, led by Boyer-Bazelais, captured Miragoâne, a port town and Liberal stronghold. The victory emboldened the insurgents, who spread their movement throughout the southern peninsula, including in Jérémie and Jacmel. By September, the insurrection had reached the nation's capital. The insurgents however failed to gain ground in Port-au-Prince. Under pressure from foreign powers concerned of the uprising threatening their business interests, President Salomon quickly reestablished order in the capital. Thereafter, the movement lost momentum and its leader, Boyer-Bazelais, died in Miragoâne in October 1883.

=== 1888–1896 ===
President Salomon's term was set to end on May 15, 1887. To keep him in power, the National Assembly amended the constitution, which had previously barred him from serving another term. On June 30, 1886, President Salomon was reelected once more for a seven-year term. Significant discontent proceeded this act of politicking, with many believing this was a step towards a presidency-for-life.

On August 4, 1888, General Seide Thélémanque, who commanded the northern provinces near Cap-Haïtien, publicly declared that he would no longer recognize Salomon's authority and formed the separatist République Septentrionale. Under pressure, Salomon resigned, leading to the formation of a provisional government led by former president Boisrond-Canal to maintain order.

On September 17, constituents were elected to decide Haiti's new president. Nearly a month later on October 14, they selected François Légitime as the new president of Haiti. Following General Thélémaque's untimely death, Florvil Hyppolite succeeded him as the new leader of the separatist government in Cap-Haïtien.

By 1889, Florvil Hyppolite led a successful uprising against Légitime and managed to reunify Haiti, ushering in an era of relative peace. Though Hyppolite fought with the backing of the Nationals, he declared himself a Liberal by the time he assumed the presidency, making the divisions increasingly blurry and ultimately irrelevant. Hyppolite declared a policy of impartial governance, pledging to avoid favoritism and ensure no group received undue advantage. Despite this, President Hyppolite exiled many National opposition figures while reintegrating prominent Liberal leaders (Edmond Paul and Anténor Firmin) into government roles.

There is considerable disagreement among Haitian writers on whether or not the Liberal Party and the National Party truly survived the deaths of their respective leaders – Boyer-Bazelais in 1883 and Salomon in 1888.

=== 1900s ===
By the 20th-century, new political forces emerged, including the Firminism movement, named after Anténor Firmin. This movement emerged during the political vacuum following the resignation of President Tirésias Simon Sam, the successor to President Hyppolite. As the elections to elect a new president approached, Firmin and General Pierre Nord Alexis emerged as the primary contenders. Those supporting Firmin were called the "Firministes" while those who supported Alexis were called the "Nordistes".

Advocating for economic reform, the reduction of military influence in politics, the broader inclusion of civilian participation in governance, and a third-way that transcended the traditional Liberal and National divide, Firminism quickly gained momentum.

Between June and December 1902, Haiti was engulfed in civil war between these two factions. However, Firmin's movement lacked the necessary military strength to succeed and it was ultimately crushed. Firmin was forced into exile once more and General Alexis was declared president of Haiti on December 17, 1902. Subsequent Firminist uprisings in 1908 also ended in defeat, and the long-awaited Firminist revolution never materialized.

== Bibliography ==
- Stieber, Chelsea (18 August 2020). Haiti's Paper War: Post-Independence Writing, Civil War, and the Making of the Republic, 1804–1954. NYU Press. pp. 201–227. ISBN 978-1479802135.
- Byrd, Brandon; Stieber, Chelsea (2023). "Introduction". Haiti for the Haitians: by Louis-Joseph Janvier. Liverpool University Press. p. 19. doi:10.2307/jj.6195059.3. ISBN 978-1-83764-446-9. JSTOR jj.6195059.3.
- Zacaïr, Philippe (January–June 2005). "Haiti On His Mind: Antonio Maceo And Caribbeanness". Caribbean Studies. 33 (1): 47–78.
- Smith, Matthew (20 October 2014). Liberty, Fraternity, Exile: Haiti and Jamaica after Emancipation. UNC Press Books. ISBN 978-1469617985.
- Bellegarde, Windsor; Lhérisson, Justin (1906). Manuel d'Histoire D'Haiti: Conforme Aux Programmes Officiels a l'Usage des Ecoles de la Republique. OCLC 2183938.
- Bethell, Leslie (1984). The Cambridge History of Latin America (PDF). Cambridge University Press. pp. 311–312.
- Logan, Rayford (1968). Haiti and the Dominican Republic. Oxford University Press, USA. p. 109. ISBN 0192149660.
- Nicholls, David (1979). From Dessalines to Duvalier: Race, Colour and National Independence in Haiti. pp. 106–141.
- Nicholls, David (1978). The Wisdom of Salomon: Myth or Reality?.
- Dayan, Joan (2004). "A Few Stories about Haiti, or, Stigma Revisited". Research in African Literatures. 35 (2): 169. doi:10.2979/RAL.2004.35.2.157. JSTOR 3821351.
- Eller, Anne (2022). ""A Fossilized Utopia"? Debates over Foreign Landownership and Development in Haiti, 1830s–1870s". Journal of Haitian Studies. 28 (1): 4–38. doi:10.1353/jhs.2022.0000. JSTOR 27211679.
