= Demesvar Delorme =

Haitian writer and politician

Education Minister of Haiti
- In office July 21, 1867 – February 10, 1868
- Preceded by: Ultimo Lafontant
- Succeeded by: Numa Rigaud

Foreign Minister of Haiti
- In office July 21, 1867 – May 20, 1868
- Preceded by: André Germain
- Succeeded by: Daguesseau Lespinasse

Haitian ambassador to Germany
- In office 1891–1897

Personal details
- Born: February 10, 1831 Cap-Haïtien
- Died: December 25, 1901 (aged 70) Paris
- Party: National Party

Demesvar Delorme (10 February 1831 – 25 December 1901) was a Haitian theoretician, writer, and politician. Born in Cap-Haïtien, he participated in Sylvain Salnave's failed rebellion against President Fabre Geffrard in 1865. After the fall of Geffrard and Salnave's election as President of Haiti in 1867, he was appointed Minister of External Relations and Minister of Public Education and Cults.

In 1868, he was forced to leave the country and fled to Paris, France, where he lived in exile for ten years, publishing several works. One of his best known writings was the essay "Les Théoriciens au Pouvoir", which postulated that political power should belong to the intellectual elite.

From 1891–1897, he was the first resident minister in Berlin with coacredition to the Holy See. In Rome he represented with Jean Joseph Dalbémar the government of Haiti in a case of border arbitrage under the auspicies of Pope Leo XIII, while the government of Santo Domingo was represented by Justino Faszowicz Baron de Farensbach and Emiliano Tejera

== Selected works ==
- "Bulletin de la Révolution" - article, published 1865
- "La Reconnaissance du Général Salnave" - article, published 1868
- "La Démocratie et le Préjugé de Couleur aux Etats-Unis" - article
- "Le Système Monroe" - article, published 1868
- "Les Théoriciens au Pouvoir" - essay, published 1870
- Francesca - novel, published 1873
- "Réflexions Diverses sur Haïti" - essay, published 1873
- "Les Paisibles" - article, published 1874
- Le Damné - novel, published 1877
