= Boisrond-Canal affair =

Diplomatic crisis

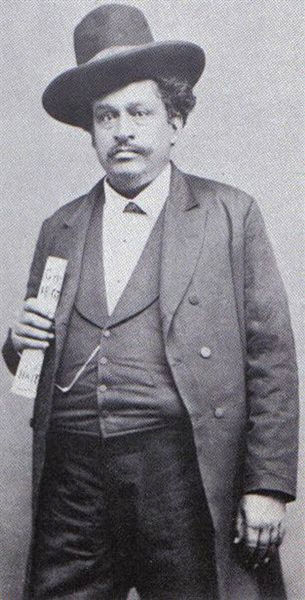
Ebenezer Bassett and Pierre Théoma Boisrond-Canal

The Boisrond-Canal affair was a diplomatic crisis between the United States and Haiti which ran for five months from May 15 until October 5, 1875.

== Background ==
=== Fallout between Boisrond-Canal and Domingue ===
Haitian general and senator Pierre Théoma Boisrond-Canal was among the band of young leaders who in 1869 successfully ousted the former Haitian President Sylvain Salnave from power. The following year, Boisrond-Canal retired from the military to his farm in Frères, a short distance from Pétionville, and was elected to the Senate of Haiti.

General Michel Domingue was elected president in 1874, and yielded success in securing a treaty of friendship with the Dominican Republic, but Haiti's domestic financial situation was devastating. Domingue tried to negotiate a loan with France, which would strain Haitian finances for years. As a result, corruption and fraud were so great that Boisrond-Canal publicly criticized this financial policy and the loan. To distract the public, Domingue issued a decree, dated May 15, 1875, for the arrests of Generals Brice, Pierre Monplaisir Pierre, and Boisrond-Canal, alleging that the three were plotting a conspiracy against his government.

According to Jacques Nicolas Léger:

Monplaisir Pierre, with gun in hand, met the soldiers who were sent to arrest him; he made an energetic resistance and in defending the entrance to his house was killed in the fight which ensued; Brice, who had also made a brave defense, was successful in reaching the Spanish Consulate, where he died from the effects of a bullet wound in the thigh. Boisrond Canal, who was living on his plantation at Frères, a short distance from Pétionville, was fortunate enough to be able to make his escape before the arrival of those who were commissioned to arrest him, and sought shelter in the United States Legation, which was then situated at Turgeau, a suburb of Port-au-Prince.

=== Bassett ===
Ebenezer Bassett was in his sixth year serving as the United States' fourth ambassador to Haiti and the first African-American ever appointed as an ambassador for the country.

== The affair ==
Canal and two young relatives arrived at Bassett's home, seeking protection and refuge. The diplomat agreed to protect them under his diplomatic immunity. "It may be that the instinct for humanity got the better of me," he later wrote to Secretary of State Hamilton Fish. "The men before me were not my personal friends. They had never visited my house before, nor I theirs. I had no merely personal interest in them."

The crisis dragged on for several days before Bassett could write to Washington. Reflecting on the issue, Bassett wrote a 21-page dispatch to the Secretary of State. He was optimistic that the government's persecution would ease. He had dealt with numerous cases of refugees in the past, and although some took weeks to resolve, the diplomat had always been successful. He was worried about the government threat. "I must confess that the presence of a thousand armed men around my country residence…with discontent stamped on their faces and Henry rifles in their hands does not quite give the best possible ground to my hope," he wrote to Fish.

Fish criticized his Minister for taking in refugees. He responded to Bassett by noting that the Haitian Ambassador to Washington, Stephen Preston, had complained about the refugees.

Fish wanted to resolve the problem quickly. He did not force his envoy to hand over the refugees, however. Despite incurring the wrath of his superiors in Washington, Bassett put all of his credibility on the line:

I am not unaware that the ground taken in my several despatches…may not be in accord with the requirements of public law… but circumstances seemed to crowd in upon me without warning, and in such a way as to leave me almost no choice. Men maddened by passion, inflamed, as I am credibly informed, by rum, and elated by consciousness of armed power, were pursuing their fellow countrymen with red-handed violence. To have closed my door upon the men pursued would have been for me to deny them their last chance of escape from being brutally put to death before my eyes.

As a result of the standoff, Bassett's home remained surrounded by over 1,000 soldiers. The nightly rhythm of loud taunts and screams, beating of metal objects, and general nuisance kept the family huddled inside trying to gain a few hours of restless sleep. Bassett first raised the idea of sending a U.S. warship to Haiti in his May 8 despatch first reporting the incident. He argued at the time that such a show of force would exert "a wholesome influence" and strengthen "our own moral force" in resolving the matter. As the conflict dragged on for weeks, with both Bassett and Domingue digging in their heels, Washington seemed paralyzed. The diplomat continued to plea for a warship through the summer. But Fish's pique at his Minister and his continued discussions with Preston, who lobbied hard against sending a ship, left the situation unresolved.

In spite of the displeasure he caused in both capitals, Bassett was seen as a hero by supporters among the Haitian people. The affair energized popular opinion in favor of the United States and raised Canal as a folk hero. "The prevailing sentiment is unmistakably in favor of [Canal], and in our favor, because we have firmly protected him against violence," Bassett wrote. No doubt part of that support for both Canal and Bassett was because of the brutality with which the regime continued to act against any and all presumed opponents. Political arrests and killings continued, and Bassett concluded, "the awful fact stares me in the face that we are all under a reign of terror."

=== Breakthrough ===
By summer's end, it looked as if Secretary Fish had finally had enough. Perhaps a more visible threat, he concluded, would cause the Domingue regime to crack. "It has been determined to apply to the Navy Department to order a man of war to Port-au-Prince with a view to your protection from insult," Fish wrote to Bassett. "That the embarrassing question adverted to may be satisfactorily adjusted before she arrives, is much to be desired."

As the ship was preparing to leave, Haitian Ambassador Preston rushed to tell Fish that Domingue was ready to capitulate. Bassett could escort Canal safely out if the warship would turn back and not enter Haitian waters. Fish agreed and instructed Bassett that a deal had been set. He was relieved to receive the news. Finally, just after midnight on October 5, 1875, Canal embraced Bassett and boarded an American-flagged ship, to sail to Jamaica and safety.

As a refugee, Canal had been essentially held captive by the government threat for more than five months. After his departure, Bassett telegrammed the Department of State informing them that the crisis had finally passed: "Refugees amicable embarked and soldiers withdrawn from around my premises yesterday."

== Aftermath ==
After a few weeks, Boisrond-Canal returned to Jamaica, where his relationship with Domingue improved so much that he was appointed commander of the army in the Ouest department by President Michel Domingue. On 23 April 1876, Boisrond-Canal replaced Michel Domingue as the first president of the provisional government, before becoming President of Haiti non-provisionally on 17 July 1876. Domingue went into exile in Kingston, Jamaica, where he died a year later. Boisrond-Canal would serve in three separate instances as president of Haiti, significantly influencing politics prior to the U.S. invasion in 1915.

Bassett would leave his post as U.S. ambassador to Haiti upon the end of the Grant administration in 1877, as was customary with a change of hands in government. In spite of any lingering resentment that may have existed in Washington because of his defiant stance, it was impossible for the department not to recognize Bassett's work. Bassett and his family boarded the boat Atlas on December 1, 1877, for the two-week trip to New York City, and Boisrond-Canal was present at the reception to wish Bassett farewell. He was succeeded by John Mercer Langston, another African-American who had established and served as the dean of Howard University's law school and who would later serve as the first black representative from Virginia. Bassett himself would later be appointed by Haitian president Lysius Salomon as Haiti's Consul General for New York City, in which Bassett would serve for ten years. Bassett would also assist Frederick Douglass, a fellow abolitionist who would also later serve for a short time as U.S. ambassador to Haiti.

Septimus Rameau, a relative of Domingue's who was appointed as vice-president and was widely seen as the power behind Domingue's presidency, was accused of being responsible for the deaths of the two generals. He was himself assassinated on a street in Port-au-Prince in 1876.

== See also ==
- African Americans in foreign policy
- Haiti–United States relations
