= Jean-Nicolas Nissage Saget =

President of Haiti (1869–1874)

Jean Nicolas Nissage Saget
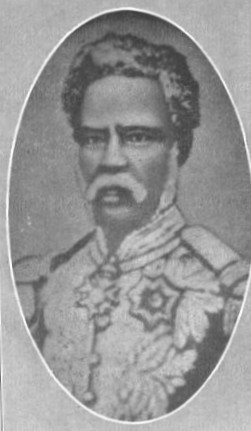

10th President of Haiti
- In office December 27, 1869 – May 13, 1874
- Vice President: Michel Domingue (1869–1870)
- Preceded by: Sylvain Salnave
- Succeeded by: Council of Secretaries of State

Provisional President of Haiti
- In office March 13, 1867 – May 4, 1867
- Preceded by: Fabre Geffrard
- Succeeded by: Sylvain Salnave

Personal details
- Born: September 20, 1810 Saint-Marc, Haiti
- Died: April 7, 1880 (aged 69) Port-au-Prince, Haiti
- Party: National Party; Liberal Party (Presidency)
- Spouse: Marie-Louise Augustin Sinni
- Profession: General

Jean-Nicolas Nissage Saget (French pronunciation: [ʒɑ̃ nikɔla nisaʒ saʒɛ]; September 20, 1810 – April 7, 1880) succeeded Sylvain Salnave as President of Haiti in 1869. Coming into power by coup, Saget was the first Haitian president to serve out his term of office (1869–1874) and retire voluntarily, although his retirement led to a renewal of the political turmoil between blacks and the country's mulatto elites. He died in 1880.

== Presidency ==
On March 19, 1870, the National Assembly elected General Nissage Saget as President of Haiti for four-year term, expiring on May 15, 1874.

During his presidency, Saget attempted to observe the Constitution of 1867. The liberals sought drastic change rather than trying to extend public liberty gradually, including by introducing the parliamentary system, trying to subject the Executive Power to the legislative body, and compelling those members of the Cabinet who were not in sympathy with the House of Representatives to relinquish their offices. Misunderstandings with the President ensued. Notwithstanding, some useful reforms took place, the most important of them being the redeeming of Haiti's paper currency.

During his presidency, Saget dealt with a number of diplomatic incidents, including the Batsch affair with Germany, the Hornet incident with Spain and the United States, and the United States' attempted annexation of neighboring Santo Domingo (the Dominican Republic). Despite these few minor troubles with the foreign powers, peace remained undisturbed.

The transfer of power from Saget to his successor did not go smoothly. The House of Representatives and the Senate, which had met in April 1874, were to assemble in National Assembly in order to elect a new President. There were two candidates for the office: Michel Domingue (Commandant of the Southern Department, supported by Saget and his followers) and Pierre Monplaisir Pierre (the candidate of the liberal party). Many of Pierre's supporters withdrew from the House because of a dispute over the validity of a key Pierre supporter's election, meaning that there was no quorum for the presidential election. Saget's term was to expire on May 15, 1874, and the liberal party tried to persuade him to remain in power until his successor could be elected. He emphatically refused, and on May 14, 1874, he relinquished the presidency to the Council of the Secretaries of State, having previously appointed Michel Domingue Commander-in-Chief of the Haitian Army.

On May 20, Saget left Port-au-Prince for Saint-Marc, on a donkey, where he lived until his death on April 7, 1880.

== Footnotes ==
Political offices
Preceded by Sylvain Salnave	President of Haiti; 1869–1874	Succeeded by Council of Secretaries of State
