= Grande-Rivière-du-Nord =

Grande-Rivière-du-Nord Grann Rivyè dinò
- Commune
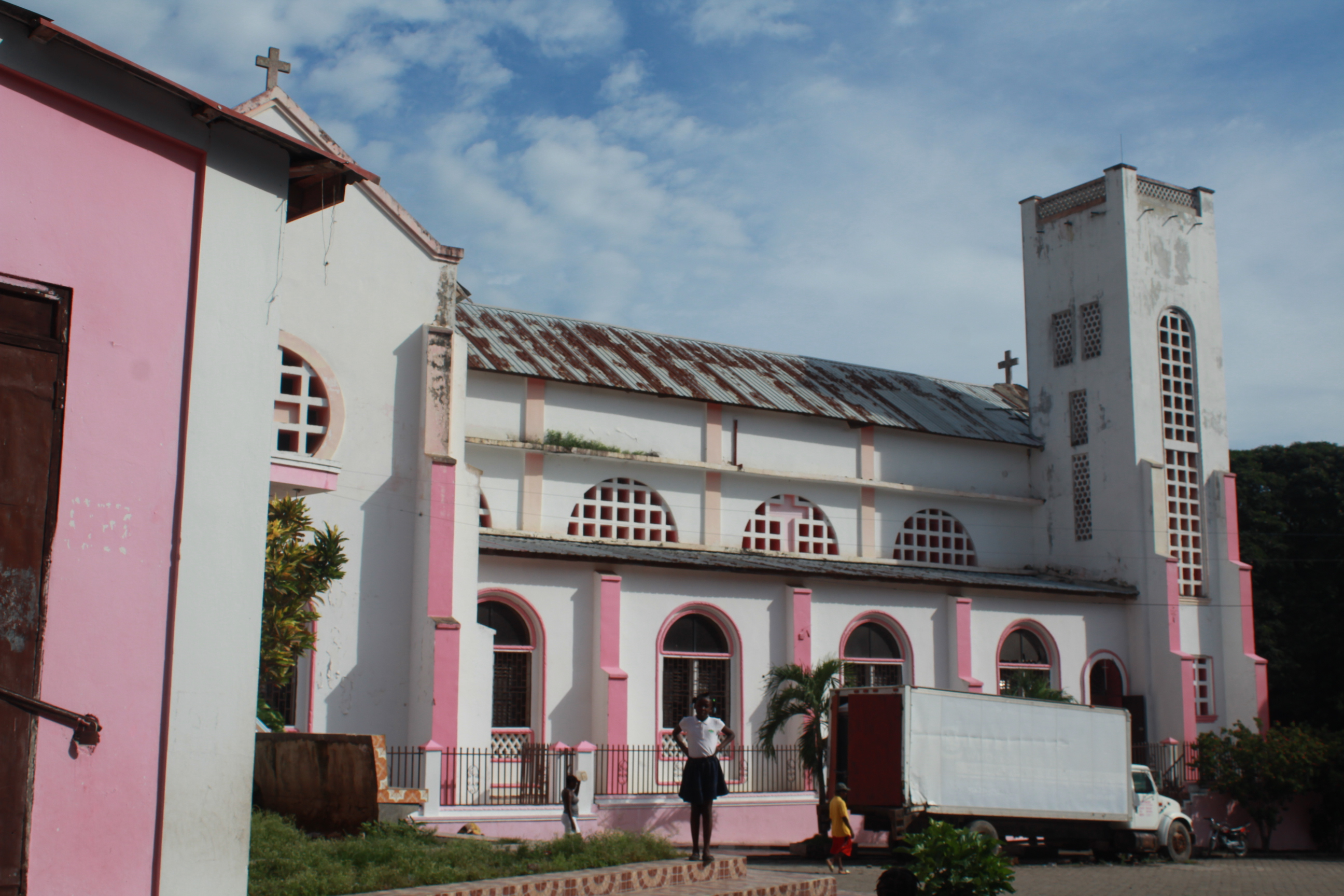
- The parish church of St. Rose of Lima

- Location in Haiti
- Coordinates: 19°35′0″N 72°11′0″W
- Country: Haiti
- Department: Nord
- Arrondissement: Grande-Rivière-du-Nord
- Elevation: 91 m (299 ft)

Population (2009)
  - Total: 37,614
- Time zone: UTC-05:00 (EST)
  - Summer (DST): UTC-04:00 (EDT)

Grande-Rivière-du-Nord (French pronunciation: [ɡʁɑ̃d ʁivjɛʁ dy nɔʁ]; Haitian Creole: Grann Rivyè dinò) is a commune in the Grande-Rivière-du-Nord Arrondissement, in the Nord Department of Haiti. Jean-Jacques Dessalines was born there in 1758 on the Cormiers plantation.

The town was established in 1712, and named after a nearby river. In addition to being the birthplace of Dessalines, it is the hometown of Jean Price-Mars, Jean-Baptiste Chavannes, Henry Namphy, Vilbrun Guillaume Sam, Tirésias Simon Sam, Jean-Baptiste Riché, and Philippe Guerrier. Grande-Rivière has retained a significant amount of colonial-era architecture.

Local landmarks include the Church of St. Rose of Lima, first built in 1712, and the Dessalines monument, unveiled in 2022. The town is a national hub of cocoa and coffee production. A team of Canadian students set up a computer-equipped library in the town in 2017.
