= Septimus Rameau =

Haitian politician

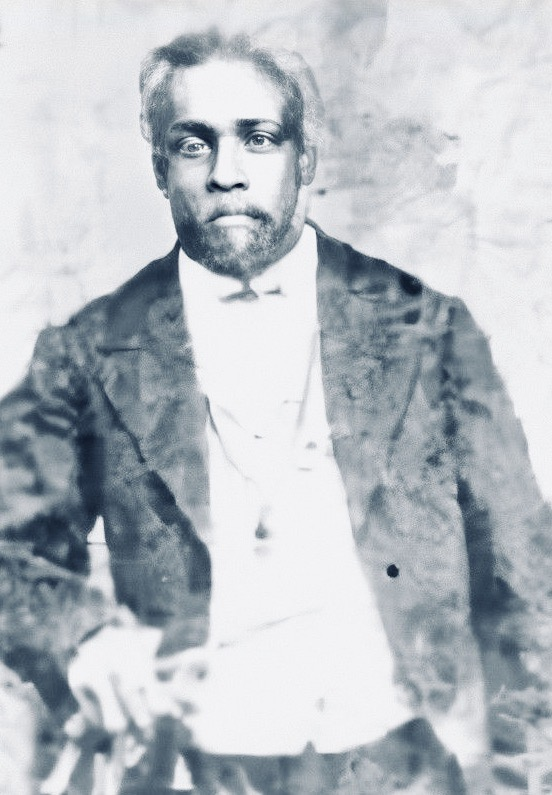

Septimus Rameau (1826-1876) was a Haitian politician and vice president who was viewed as the power behind the 1874-1876 presidency of Michel Domingue.

Rameau was born on September 19, 1826. Rameau was Domingue's nephew. Domingue, who was primarily a soldier, had neither the stature nor the tact of a statesman. He therefore issued a decree on September 10, 1874, appointing Rameau to manage public functions as the Vice President of the Council of Secretaries of State. Septimus Rameau thus became the true ruler of Haiti. Rameau was dictatorial and domineering by nature, while Michel Domingue was more of a figurehead. He was Minister of Finance in 1871.

In connection with the Boisrond-Canal Affair, Generals Brice and Pierre Monplaisir Pierre were killed. Septimus Rameau was accused of being responsible for the deaths of the two generals, as well as a controversial proposed loan with France. He was assassinated on a street in Port-au-Prince on April 15, 1876.
