= Tirésias Simon Sam =

President of Haiti from 1896 to 1902

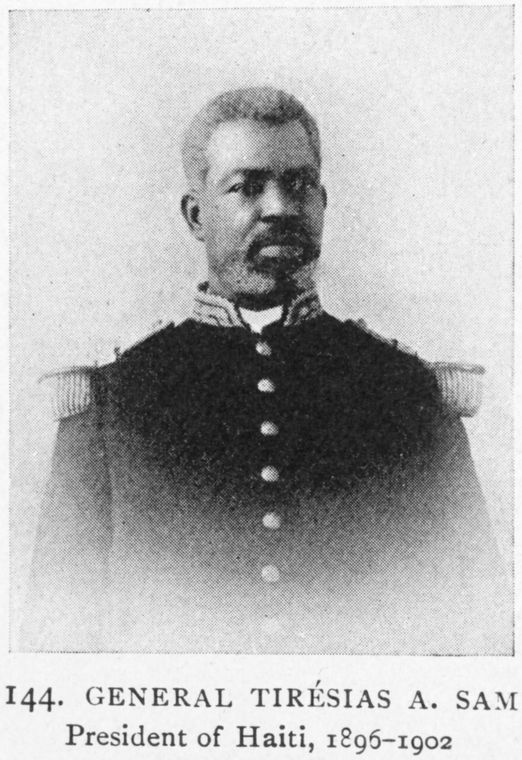

16th President of Haiti
- In office 31 March 1896 – 12 May 1902
- Preceded by: Florvil Hyppolite
- Succeeded by: Pierre Nord Alexis

Minister of War and Navy
- In office 27 December 1894 – 31 March 1896
- President: Florvil Hyppolite
- Preceded by: Alson Verne
- Succeeded by: Borno Monpoint
- In office 15 May 1887 – 10 August 1888
- President: Lysius Salomon
- Preceded by: Brenor Prophète
- Succeeded by: Seïde Thélémaque

Minister of Interior and Agriculture
- In office 1 September 1879 – 3 November 1879
- Preceded by: Armand Thoby
- Succeeded by: Evariste Laroche

Member of the Provisional Government of the Republic of Haiti
- In office 26 July 1879 – 23 October 1879

Personal details
- Born: Paul Tirésias Augustin Simon Sam; 15 May 1835 Grande-Rivière-du-Nord, Haiti
- Died: 11 May 1916 (aged 80)
- Party: National Party
- Spouse(s): Constance Salomon (first); Victoire Labelle (second); Alphaïde Metelly (third)
- Profession: Military general

Paul Tirésias Augustin Simon Sam (15 May 1835 – 11 May 1916) was the president of Haiti from 31 March 1896 to 12 May 1902. He resigned the presidency just before completing his six-year term.

== Biography ==
Born in the year 1835, Tirésias Simon Sam was a well-received politician and he rose to become the country's president in the year 1896. Sam resigned before completion of his presidential term. His political popularity has seen several postage stamps in Haiti bear his likeness. There were reports that Victoire Jean-Baptiste, the president's mistress, had much influence on his leadership.

According to the constitution of Haiti, Sam was elected as the new Haitian president, a week after his predecessor Hyppolite died. Sam was instituted by the National Assembly which held a meeting in Port-au-Prince on 31 March 1896. Before the new position, Sam was the secretary of war for Haiti. His new term was to run for a period of seven years according to the Haitian constitution.

All the relevant people in governance had accepted the election of the new president. Sam was sworn in on 1 April 1896.

Despite humiliation and pressure from foreign authorities, especially the United States and Germany, Haiti remained calm during the reign of Sam.

Sam's predecessors had emphasized infrastructure development, something that Sam embraced. During his governance a new structure to hold the country's Court of Justice was started in Port-au-Prince. New railways were constructed to connect major towns to the Haitian capital. In 1900, Simon Sam's government signed a treaty of reciprocity with France. In 1902 the United States also signed a treaty with Haiti on naturalization.

The Haitian General Assembly had misinterpreted the constitution concerning Sam's term in office. The issue had been published in local newspapers and was raising concerns. Whereas the National Assembly had declared that Sam was to remain in office until 15 May 1903 this was contrary to the Haitian constitution. According to the Constitution of Haiti, article 93 reads: "In case of the death, resignation, or dismissal of the President, his successor is appointed for seven years, and his power must always cease on 15 May, even if the seventh year of his term be not completed." This article was applicable to the presidential term of Simon Sam. His election was on 31 March 1896 and so he was supposed to leave the presidential seat on 15 May 1902.

Sam wrote a letter of resignation to the Haitian National Assembly on 12 May 1902, three days before the constitutional expiry of his presidential term. He left Port-au-Prince the following day. After Sam's resignation, Haiti was left in the hands of an interim government that was led by General Boisrond Canal, a former head of state of the country. This provisional government was responsible for maintaining law and order before an election of a legal president.

The son of Sam, Vilbrun Guillaume Sam, was also a president of Haiti for only five months in 1915. His mistress, Victoire Jean-Baptiste, is said to have had some influence over him.

Political offices
Preceded by Florvil Hyppolite	President of Haiti; 1896–1902	Succeeded by Pierre Théoma Boisrond-Canal (Provisional)
