= Philippe Guerrier =

President of Haiti from 1844 to 1845

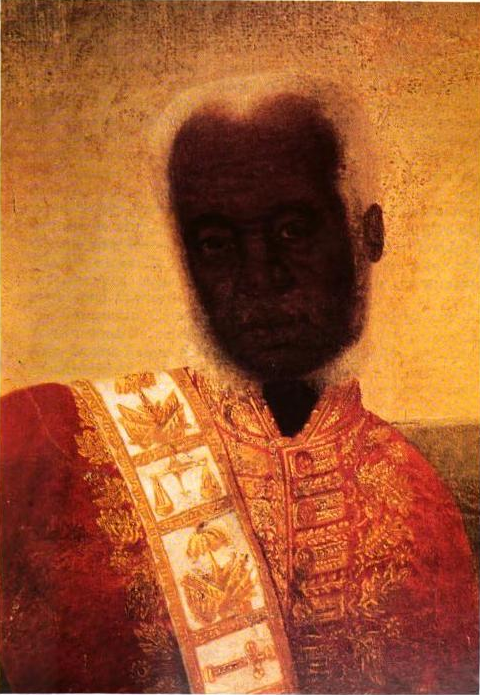

4th President of Haiti
- In office May 3, 1844 – April 15, 1845
- Preceded by: Charles Rivière-Hérard
- Succeeded by: Jean-Louis Pierrot

Foreign Minister, War and Navy
- In office April 4, 1843 – January 7, 1844
- President: Charles Rivière-Hérard
- Preceded by: André Laudun (War and Navy)
- Succeeded by: Hérard Dumesle

Personal details
- Born: Jean-Jacques Louis Philippe Guerrier; December 19, 1757 Grande-Rivière-du-Nord, Saint-Domingue
- Died: April 15, 1845 (aged 87) Saint-Marc, Haiti
- Profession: Military

Jean-Jacques Louis Philippe Guerrier, Duke of L'Avance, Count of Mirebalais (French pronunciation: [ʒɑ̃ ʒak lwi filip ɡɛʁje]; December 19, 1757 – April 15, 1845) was a career officer and general in the Haitian Army who became the president of Haïti on May 3, 1844. He died in office on April 15, 1845.

== Early life ==
A respected soldier, Guerrier had successfully commanded the southern black army during the Haitian Revolution. After Haiti became independent, he retired from active service and became a plantation owner. King Henry I gave him the hereditary title of Duke of l'Avancé and Count of Mirebalais.

== Presidency ==
In 1844, discontent erupted among rural farmers and cultivators over economic conditions within the country. These disaffected groups formed bands of armed men known as "piquets". The piquets were gradually brought under the command of a former army officer, Louis Jean-Jacques Acaau, who used them to disrupt government control over the south of Haiti. Eventually, with their increasing success, the piquets acquired political aspirations. The foremost of these were the dismantling of mulatto power over the government and a return to black rule. These goals were believed to have been met when in May 1844, President Rivière-Hérard was removed from office by the mulatto hierarchy and replaced with the aged black general Philippe Guerrier, who assumed the presidency on May 3, 1844. Guerrier held office for only 11 months before he died on April 15, 1845.

Political offices
Preceded by Charles Rivière-Hérard	President of Haiti; 1844–45	Succeeded by Jean-Louis Pierrot
