= Michel Domingue =

President of Haiti (1813-1877)

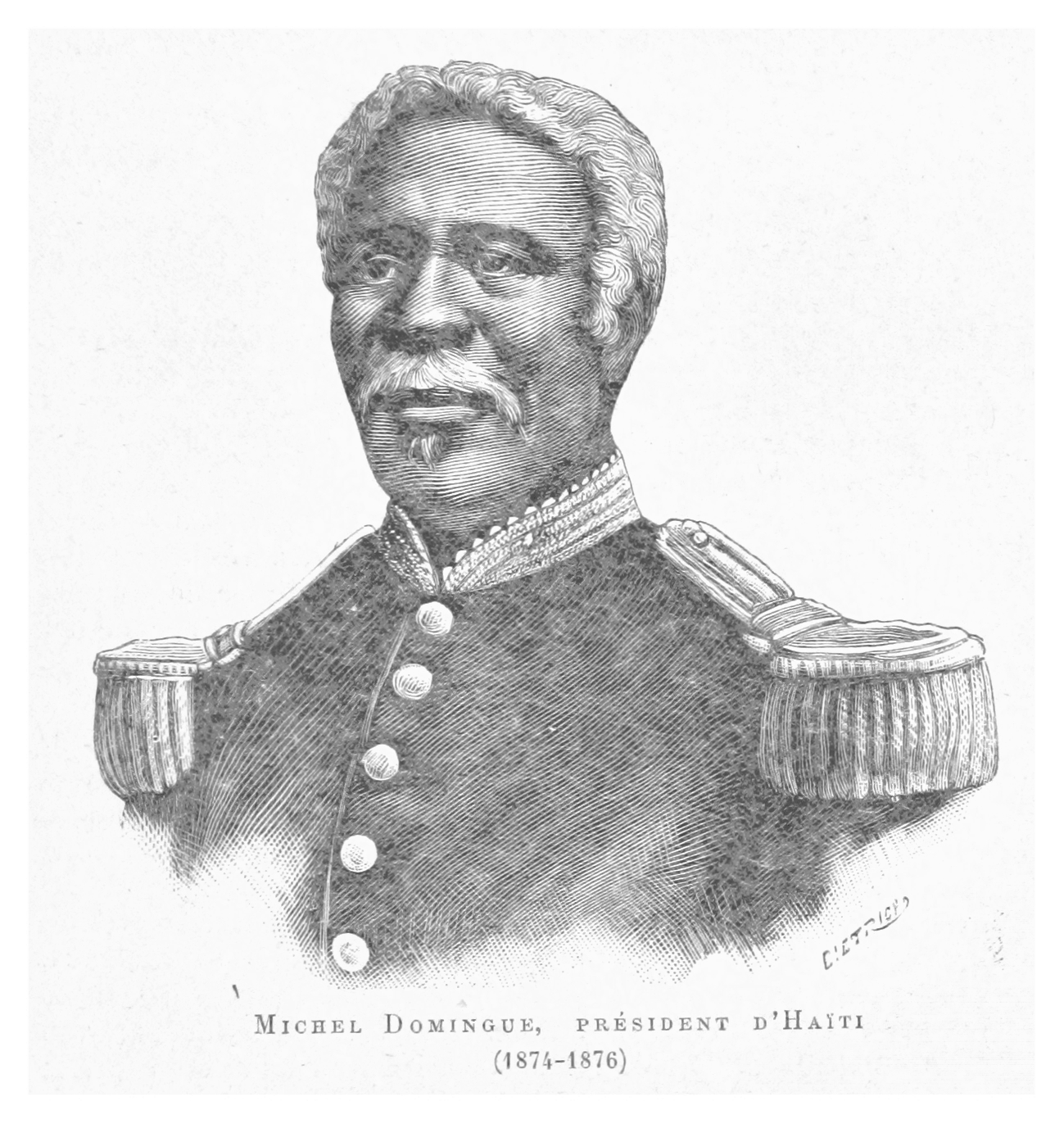

President of Haiti
- In office 14 June 1874 – 15 April 1876
- Vice President: Septimus Rameau
- Preceded by: Council of Secretaries of State
- Succeeded by: Pierre Théoma Boisrond-Canal

Vice-President of the Provisional Government of Haiti
- In office 27 December 1869 – 16 March 1870
- President: Nissage Saget

Personal details
- Born: 28 July 1813 Les Cayes, Haiti
- Died: 24 May 1877 (aged 63) Kingston, British Jamaica
- Party: National Party
- Spouse: Pauline Strattman
- Profession: Military

Michel Domingue (French pronunciation: [miʃɛl dɔmɛ̃ɡ]; July 28, 1813 – May 24, 1877) served as the president of Haiti from 14 June 1874 to 15 April 1876.

== Biography ==
Michel Domingue was born in Les Cayes in 1813. He graduated from military training and became commander of army units in Sud.

From 8 May 1868 to December 1869, he was president of the autonomous states of the south of Haiti. He was appointed Vice President of the provisional government of Nissage Saget in 1869. On 11 June 1874, General Domingue was elected for a term of eight years as president of Haiti.

Domingue, who was primarily a soldier, had neither the stature nor the tact of a statesman. He therefore issued a decree on 10 September 1874 appointing Septimus Rameau to manage public functions as the Vice-President of the Council of Secretaries of State. Septimus Rameau thus became the true ruler of Haiti. Rameau was dictatorial and domineering by nature, while Michel Domingue was more of a figurehead.

One of Domingue's first acts after his election to the presidency was the signing of an agreement with the Dominican Republic, which the Haitian congress refused to ratify. The agreement established the countries' mutual recognition and in particular an end to the long and bloody border war between them. Septimus Rameau also led negotiations with the President of the Dominican Republic Ignacio María González. The Chief of Staff of President Domingue, General N. Léger, was sent to Santo Domingo to prepare a new agreement. Upon his return to Port-au-Prince on 9 November 1874, he was accompanied by Dominican negotiators to seal a treaty of friendship and an accord on trade and navigation. Haiti recognized and accepted the full independence of the Dominican Republic, and on 20 January 1875 the treaty of friendship was signed between the two countries.

Despite this success in international politics, Haiti's domestic financial situation was devastating. Domingue tried to negotiate a loan with France, which would strain Haitian finances for years. Finally, corruption and fraud were so great that Domingue issued a decree, dated 15 May 1875, for the arrest of Generals Brice, Pierre Monplaisir Pierre, and Pierre Théoma Boisrond-Canal, his political opponent. Boisrond-Canal criticized this financial policy and the loan. He took refuge at the embassy of the United States, causing a diplomatic crisis between Haiti and the United States. Brice and Pierre Monplaisir Pierre were killed while Boisrond-Canal and other opponents fled abroad. Septimus Rameau was accused of being responsible for the deaths of the two generals, as well as the proposed loan with France. He was himself assassinated on a street in Port-au-Prince.

Domingue resigned on 15 April 1876 and went into exile in Kingston, Jamaica, where he died a year later.

Political offices
Preceded by Council of Secretaries of State	President of Haiti; 1874–1876	Succeeded by Pierre Théoma Boisrond-Canal
