= Pierre Théoma Boisrond-Canal =

President of Haiti

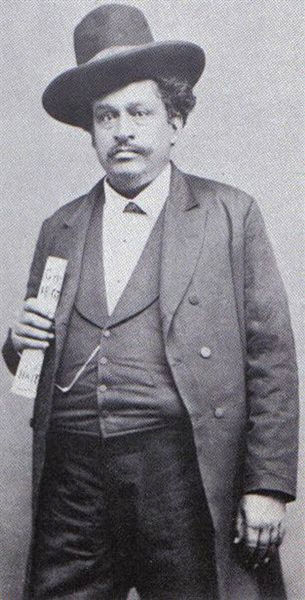

President of the Provisional Government of Haiti
- In office 26 May 1902 – 17 December 1902
- Preceded by: Himself
- Succeeded by: Pierre Nord Alexis

President of the Committee of Public Safety of Haiti
- In office 14 May 1902 – 26 May 1902
- Preceded by: Tirésias Simon Sam
- Succeeded by: Himself

Minister of War and Navy
- In office 1 October 1888 – 15 October 1888
- Preceded by: Séïde Thélémaque
- Succeeded by: Anselme Prophète

President of the Provisional Government of Haiti
- In office 1 September 1888 – 16 December 1888
- Preceded by: Lysius Salomon
- Succeeded by: François Denys Légitime

12th President of Haiti
- In office 23 April 1876 – 17 July 1879
- Preceded by: Michel Domingue
- Succeeded by: Lysius Salomon

Member of the Provisional Government of Haiti
- In office 23 April 1876 – 19 July 1876

Personal details
- Born: 12 June 1832 Les Cayes, Haiti
- Died: 6 March 1905 (aged 72) Port-au-Prince, Haiti
- Party: Liberal Party
- Spouse(s): Marie Claire Wilmina Phipps; Lise Régnier

Pierre Théoma Boisrond-Canal (French pronunciation: [pjɛʁ teɔma bwaʁɔ̃ kanal]; 12 June 1832 – 6 March 1905) was a Haitian politician who served as the president of Haiti three times.

Boisrond-Canal was born on 12 June 1832 in the town of Les Cayes, Haiti. He began a military career. He was an officer from 1858 to 1867 during the administration of Fabre Geffrard. He then retired from military service and became a farmer.

His political career began in 1870, when he was elected a senator in Port-au-Prince. He was then re-elected until 1875. After the riots of May 1875, after which, he was holed up in the home of U.S. ambassador Ebenezer Bassett for five months from May to October, he went into exile in Kingston, Jamaica, for a few weeks. On his return, he was appointed the commander of the army in the Ouest department by President Michel Domingue. On 23 April 1876, he replaced Michel Domingue as the first president of the provisional government, before becoming President of Haiti non-provisionally on 17 July 1876. The 1867 Constitution gave him a mandate of four years. During Boisrond-Canal's administration, tensions in domestic politics and foreign affairs grew, particularly because of the differences between liberal and nationalist parties in Parliament. Following a stormy debate in the House of Representatives on 30 June 1879, there were riots in Port-au-Prince in which the Liberal leader Jean-Pierre Boyer-Bazelais played a significant role. Although the government managed to restore law and order, Boisrond-Canal resigned as president on 17 July 1879, unable to mediate between the Liberal and National parties. The successor to the presidency was Lysius Salomon. After his resignation, Boisrond-Canal left again in exile in Jamaica.

After Boisrond-Canal's return from exile and Salomon's resignation on 10 August 1888, Boisrond-Canal was again named Acting President of Haiti. He was succeeded as president by François Denys Légitime on 16 October 1888. On 26 May 1902, Boisrond-Canal was appointed successor to Tirésias Simon Sam as the new interim president of Haiti. On 17 December 1902, Pierre Nord Alexis became his successor.

Boisrond-Canal was one of the most influential politicians of his time in Haiti, and significantly influenced Haitian politics even when not serving as president. He died in Port-au-Prince on 6 March 1905.

Boisrond-Canal's younger brother, Louis-Auguste Boisrond-Canal, was an active political figure in 1908 as a member of the commission for public order and interim president of Haiti.

Political offices
Preceded by Michel Domingue	President of Haiti; 1876–79	Succeeded by Joseph Lamothe
Preceded by Lysius Salomon	President of Haiti; 1888	Succeeded by François Denys Légitime
Preceded by Tirésias Simon Sam	President of Haiti; 1902	Succeeded by Pierre Nord Alexis
