= Joseph Lamothe =

President of Haiti (Provisional)
- In office 26 July 1879 – 2 October 1879
- Preceded by: Pierre Théoma Boisrond-Canal
- Succeeded by: Lysius Salomon

Joseph Lamothe (French pronunciation: [ʒozɛf lamɔt]) was the provisional President of Haiti from 26 July 1879 to 2 October 1879, when he was succeeded by Lysius Salomon.

Following a stormy debate in the House of Representatives on 30 June 1879, there were riots in Port-au-Prince in which the Liberal leader Jean-Pierre Boyer-Bazelais exerted a significant role. Although the government eventually managed to restore law and order, President Pierre Théoma Boisrond-Canal resigned as president on 17 July 1879, unable to mediate between the Liberal and National parties. Lamothe was then appointed as provisional president.

Solomon returned from exile in August 1879 and was brought on as president soon after.

Preceded by Pierre Théoma Boisrond-Canal	President of Haiti (provisional)	Succeeded by Lysius Salomon
