= Fabre Geffrard =

President of Haiti from 1859 to 1867

Guillaume Fabre Nicolas Geffrard
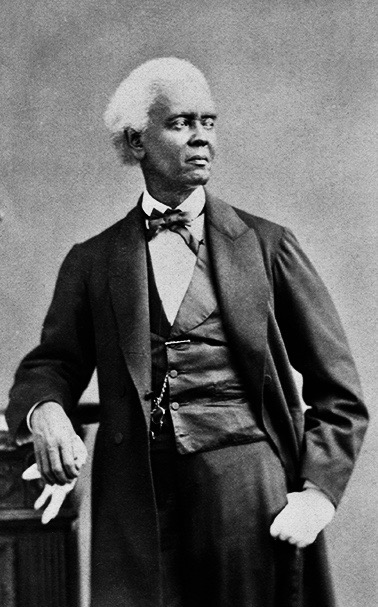
- Geffrard in 1867

10th President of Haiti
- In office 18 January 1859 – 13 March 1867
- Preceded by: Position re-established Faustin Soulouque (as Emperor)
- Succeeded by: Jean-Nicolas Nissage Saget (provisional)

Personal details
- Born: 19 September 1806 (disputed: 19–23 September 1806) Anse-à-Veau, Haiti
- Died: 31 December 1878 (aged 72) Kingston, Jamaica
- Children: Cora Blancfort (daughter)
- Awards: Duke of Tabarra
- Nickname: "Redeemer of the Republic"

Military service
- Allegiance: Haiti
- Branch/service: Haitian Army
- Rank: General

Guillaume Fabre Nicolas Geffrard (French pronunciation: [ɡijom fabʁ nikɔla ʒɛfʁaʁ]; 19 or 23 September 1806 – 31 December 1878), known as the "Redeemer of the Republic", was a mulatto general in the Haitian army and President of Haiti from 1859 until his deposition in 1867.

On 18 April 1852, Faustin Soulouque made him Duke of Tabara. After collaborating in a coup to remove Faustin Soulouque from power in order to return Haiti to the social and political control of the colored elite, Geffrard was made president in 1859.

To placate the peasants he renewed the practice of selling state-owned lands and ended a schism with the Roman Catholic Church which then took on an important role in improving education. After surviving several rebellions, he was overthrown by Major Sylvain Salnave in 1867. Geffrard was the first head of state of Haiti to have been born in the 19th century, as well as the first to be born after independence.

== Life prior to presidency ==
Fabre Geffrard was born on 19 September/23 September 1806, in L'Anse-à-Veau, located in southern Haiti. His father, General Nicolas Geffrard, was a veteran of the Haitian Revolution and had contributed to drafting the 1806 Constitution. The elder Geffrard died before his son's birth, leaving the infant Fabre orphaned. He was then adopted by Colonel Fabre, a close associate of his late father. Colonel Fabre ensured the young Geffrard received an education in Aux Cayes.

Following in his father's footsteps, Geffrard joined the Haitian military at the age of 15. He enlisted in his father's former unit, the 13th Regiment. This period coincided with the relatively stable presidency of Jean-Pierre Boyer (1818–1843), who had successfully unified Haiti with the eastern part of the island (modern-day Dominican Republic). Although Geffrard's early military service was unremarkable, he demonstrated steady progression through the ranks.

His military career accelerated significantly following the overthrow of President Boyer in 1843. During the presidency of Philippe Guerrier (1844–1845), Geffrard attained a command position in Jacmel in 1845. However, Guerrier's successor, Jean-Baptiste Riché (1846–1847), viewed Geffrard as a political rival and removed him from this post.

Geffrard then faced trial before a military court presided over by Faustin Soulouque, an ascending military figure who would later become emperor of Haiti. Despite the charges brought against him, Soulouque ultimately granted Geffrard a pardon.

Upon President Riché's death in 1847, Soulouque was elected president as a compromise candidate. Within two years, through adept political maneuvering, Soulouque proclaimed himself Emperor Faustin I, ruler of the newly established Second Empire of Haiti. Determined to reunify Hispaniola after the Dominican Republic's declaration of independence, Soulouque entrusted Geffrard—by then a close general—with leading a military campaign against the Dominicans. Geffrard achieved a notable victory at La Tabarra. The emperor, greatly pleased by this success, bestowed upon Geffrard the title "Duke of La Tabarra." While Geffrard did not fully embrace the ducal title, he did not object to the fame accompanying his battlefield achievements.

However, during Emperor Soulouque's third invasion of the Dominican Republic, lasting from 1855 to 1856, the campaign ended disastrously. Soulouque suffered three humiliating defeats and sustained heavy losses, forcing him to reluctantly accept a truce while still maintaining Haiti's claim to sovereignty over the eastern part of the island. Only remnants of his army returned intact to Haiti. This military failure caused much of the mystical authority and prestige that had made Soulouque feared throughout the nation to evaporate.

By this time, General Geffrard was widely perceived as the only capable leader within the imperial regime. Both the Haitian masses and the educated elite regarded him as a harbinger of necessary change. The appearance of a rare double-tailed comet was interpreted by the superstitious as a favorable omen for his potential success.

Revolutionaries plotting against the emperor in the Artibonite Valley dispatched a delegation to Fabre Geffrard, urging him to assume command of their revolution. Sensing the growing threat posed by Geffrard's popularity, Faustin ordered his arrest. Geffrard managed a narrow escape by boat. Landing at Gonaïves with only a small contingent of men, he seized control of the town without bloodshed. There, on 23 December 1858, Geffrard raised his standard and declared the restoration of the republic. The revolutionary movement gained immediate traction in the northern regions, while the south and west initially remained quiet. It was not until Emperor Faustin personally led his troops in an attempt to suppress the uprising that the rest of Haiti erupted in widespread armed revolt. The imperial army rapidly collapsed. By New Year's Day, the vast majority of Haiti was firmly under republican control.

== Presidency ==
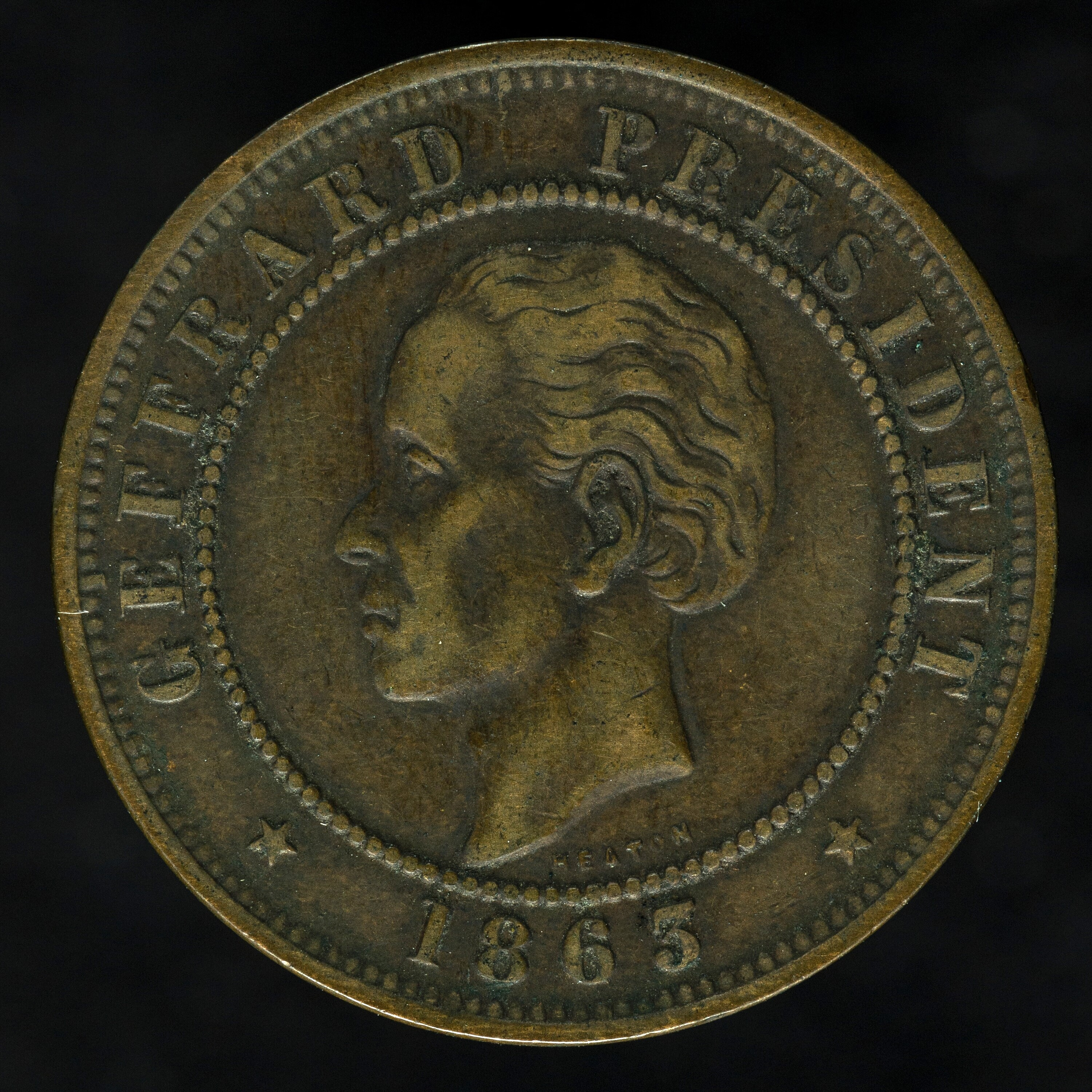
Geffrard President (coin, 1865)

Fabre Geffrard was sworn in as president of Haiti on 18 January 1859. His accession received broad public support, welcomed as it marked the reestablishment of the republican system after the imperial regime. Addressing the official opening of the Chamber of Representatives on 14 April, Geffrard openly condemned the tyranny of Emperor Faustin and denounced the previous administration's mismanagement of national resources.

Positioning himself as a conservative liberal, Geffrard advocated for cautious, gradual reform over revolutionary change. In his legislative address, he emphasized his commitment to stability and continuity. He stated that upon being called to lead the revolution that overthrew the empire, he had deliberately ensured it cost "not even a drop of blood," asserting that "the most moral and peaceful revolutions are the best." Geffrard expressed his belief in the danger of completely overthrowing existing structures to rebuild everything anew. Instead, he argued it was "wise and prudent to conserve intact the institutions of our republican regime" that had been lost under the Empire, seeking to restore their "legitimate influence and their free action."

This philosophy was reflected in the new constitution adopted by the reestablished republic. It closely resembled the 1846 charter, reinstating fundamental aspects of the pre-imperial system. Key provisions included the restoration of the life presidency, ensuring the president remained in office until death, and granting the executive branch significant authority, notably the power to dissolve congress when deemed necessary.

=== Religion ===
In March 1860, President Geffrard signed Haiti's first concordat with the Holy See, formally re-establishing relations between the nation and the Catholic Church. The Vatican had withheld recognition since Haiti's independence from France in 1804. Upon finally agreeing to relations, the Vatican initially sought to designate Haiti as a missionary territory under an Apostolic prefect rather than granting it full diocesan status with its own bishops. Haiti rejected this subordinate position, insisting on equal standing with other Catholic nations through the establishment of its own dioceses. The Vatican ultimately consented to this demand, but on the condition that the Haitian government assume financial responsibility for subsidizing the Church.

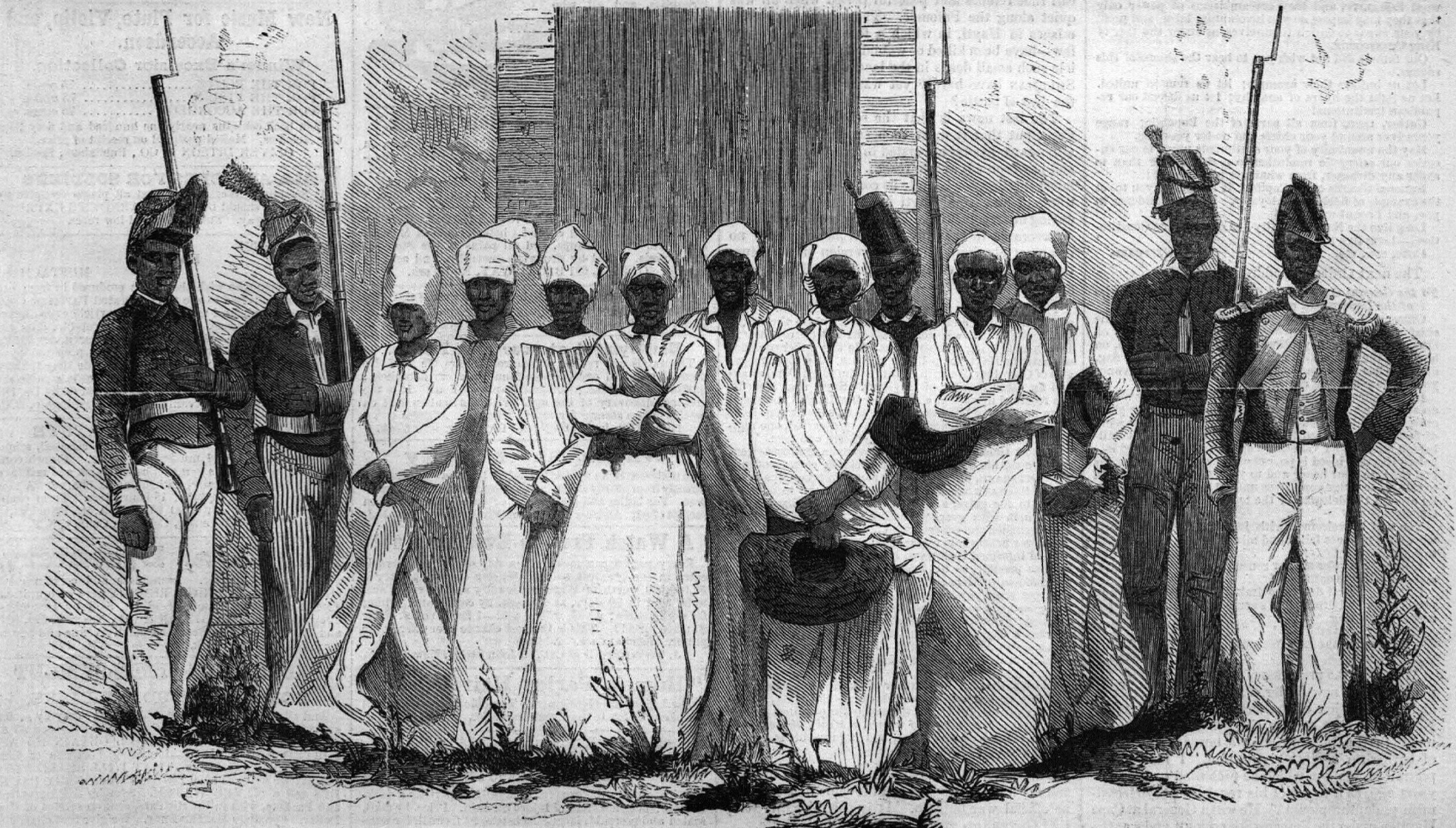
The eight Voodoo devotees found guilty in 1864 of the murder and eating of a 12-year-old girl.

Geffrard, a Catholic, actively suppressed the practice of Vodou. He issued orders for the destruction of Vodou altars, drums, and other ritual instruments. His anti-Vodou policies were starkly illustrated by the 1864 Affaire de Bizoton. Following the alleged ritual murder and cannibalism of a twelve-year-old girl by Vodou practitioners, Geffrard ordered a rigorous investigation. The resulting public executions received widespread attention, particularly through the sensationalized account featured in British minister Sir Spencer St. John's best-selling book, Hayti, or the black republic.

=== Economy ===
Under Emperor Faustin Soulouque, Haiti's economy underwent a significant decline. Industrial development remained largely stagnant, showing minimal advancement since the colonial era under French rule. Well into the mid-19th century, agricultural technology was notably underdeveloped; as late as 1861, basic tools like iron plows were still uncommon. Contemporary observers, such as British diplomat Frederick W. Seward, attributed Haiti's persistent economic difficulties to fundamental deficiencies. Seward specifically identified a critical lack of capital, skilled labor, technical expertise, and political stability as the root causes.

Upon assuming power, President Fabre Geffrard initiated a series of economic reforms designed to revitalize the country's ailing economy, which had suffered from prolonged mismanagement under previous administrations. Among his initial measures was the abolition of the arbitrary "royal fifth" export duty. This was replaced with a more efficient port duty system, leading to fairer and more effective revenue collection. Geffrard also eliminated restrictive trade barriers and, on 3 November 1864, signed a treaty of trade and navigation with the United States. This agreement granted Haiti "most-favored-nation" status and remained in effect until 1904.

Addressing Haiti's unstable financial system became another priority. Preceding governments had engaged in the excessive issuance of paper money, causing significant Inflation and a devalued currency. Geffrard attempted to correct this by recalling large quantities of devalued treasury notes and restricting the circulation of new paper currency. Despite these efforts, inflation persisted, evidenced by an exchange rate where $6 U.S. in gold could command $100 in Haitian paper currency.

Land ownership and resource management also received attention. Much of Haiti's farmland was controlled by the state or absentee landlords, limiting the independence of small farmers. While Geffrard did not implement widespread land redistribution, he permitted individuals to purchase up to fifteen acres of state-owned land and attempted to legalize squatter claims through a registration process, although most peasants lacked familiarity with the required bureaucratic procedures. To promote resource development, he launched a nationwide mineral survey that identified deposits of gold, copper, and coal. However, a lack of capital and foreign investment hindered large-scale mining operations.

Revitalizing agricultural output, especially cotton production, became one of the aims of Geffrard's administration. The outbreak of the American Civil War disrupted global cotton supplies, presenting an economic opportunity. Recognizing this, Geffrard actively encouraged domestic cotton cultivation through government incentives, including bounties. Global cotton prices surged dramatically during the conflict, rising from approximately eight U.S. cents per pound in 1859 to around twenty-five cents by 1863. Consequently, Haiti's economic outlook improved substantially. In 1863, Geffrard himself noted, "Of all our progress in agriculture, the most remarkable is cotton culture; encouraged by remunerative prices, it has acquired in a little time an extraordinary development." However, this economic boom proved temporary and collapsed following the conclusion of the Civil War.

In a further attempt to bolster the cotton industry, Geffrard initiated a scheme to import trained African American workers from the United States. This immigration program, however, failed due to inadequate planning. The immigrants were unprepared for the tropical climate, and some were settled on land lacking a water supply, ultimately stifling the program's success.

=== Second wave of emigration ===
During the 1820s, emigration became a popular option to African-Americans, who felt victimized by both economic and racial injustices. President Jean-Pierre Boyer promoted the first mass-emigration movement. This first wave of emigration however, failed to result in a mass exodus of people from America. Only some 13,000 African-Americans actually made the journey to Haiti, between 1824 and 1827. Though promise of political freedom was enticing, Haiti did not prove to be their promised land. By the 1850s however, there was renewed interest in emigration, and particularly, emigration to Haiti. At the 1854 National Emigration Convention in Cleveland, leaders resolved to pursue emigration as a strategy of racial uplift, with Haiti being strongly favored. In 1855, James Theodore Holly traveled to Haiti to establish emigration frameworks with the Haitian government and returned with a positive report.

Antiemigrationists opposed the movement, pointing to the failure of past efforts such as the 1824 fiasco under Boyer. Critics argued that beyond their common race and ethnicity, African-Americans and Haitians differed too greatly on almost every part of their culture. P. Smith, a columnist for the Weekly Anglo-African, warned that such fundamental differences would spell doom for the emigrationist experiment.

Upon gaining power, Fabre Geffrard endorsed Holly's emigration project. The emigrationists praised Geffrard, who they believed would bring stability to the Haitian government. His efforts, including building a water system for the capital city and reforming the education system by opening new schools throughout the country, and setting up a national foundry, showed that he was working to modernize and improve Haiti's economy, infrastructure, and education. Like his predecessors, Geffrard planned to enlist the help of African-Americans in working the fields, and hoped that the new labor force would mean the completion of his development projects and eventually the creation of a prosperous Haiti. To attract emigration, Geffrard offered a range of benefits including the ability to purchase fertile land at fair prices from private owners as well as from the state, exemption from military duty, religious liberty, education, government-subsidized infrastructure to serve new settlers.

To further the cause, Fabre Geffrard appointed James Redpath, a Scottish abolitionist and a friend of John Brown's, as official intermediary and became the general agent of the Bureau of Emigration. To promote the movement, Redpath published the book Guide to Hayti, which portrayed Haiti as a land of opportunity for people of African descent. He also published The Pine and Palm, the official paper promoting emigration.

By early 1861, the second wave of emigration began in earnest. Holly, by now a dedicated advocate of the movement, sailed with 111 emigrants from New York to Haiti. Another 51 were picked up in Boston. By 1 June, they had arrived at Port-au-Prince. Records from The Pine and Palm reported 140 African-Americans arriving in June and May alone. An additional 757 emigrated by the end of 1861.

Nevertheless, the antiemigrationists were right in their criticisms. The second emigration wave suffered the same problems the first emigration wave that began in 1824 suffered. Emigrationists who actually made the journey complained of broken promises from the Haitian government, especially regarding land distribution. Many emigrants struggled with the tropical climate and were shocked by cultural differences in dress, customs, and social norms.

The emigrationists were also disillusioned at Haiti's military despotism. As the nation experienced escalating civil strife, forced conscription was introduced, including on the African-American emigrants, who cloaked themselves with the American flag and refused to renounced their US citizenship to avoid military service. In desperation, some even appealed to the American consul in Port-au-Prince for protection.

The majority of the emigrants who had crossed over ended up returning. Returnees condemned the emigration movement, and its leaders, including Redpath and Holly. By the end of 1862, the emigration movement had withered. Redpath resigned under pressure, and The Pine and Palm stopped its publication.

=== Foreign Policy ===
Due to its origins from a violent slave revolt, Haiti had long been isolated from the international community for decades. Only France out of all of the great powers recognized Haiti, while the others avoided formal diplomatic ties. The country had limited alliances and was regarded warily by even its Latin American neighbors. By the time of Abraham Lincoln’s inauguration in 1861, America still had no formal ties with Haiti, which was largely due to opposition from the South. Geffrard inherited this isolated status and was determined to reverse it.

With the Southern secession and the start of the American Civil War, Haiti's diplomatic fortunes changed. Lincoln, in his 1861 message to Congress, endorsed formal recognition, stating: "if good reason exists why we should persevere longer in withholding recognition our recognition of the independence and sovereignty of Haiti and Liberia, I am unable to discern it." The following year, in 1862, Benjamin F. Whidden was sent as the first American envoy to Haiti.

==== War in the Dominican Republic ====
Following the defeat of Emperor Soulouque's invasion in 1856, Haiti maintained its constitutional claim to sovereignty over the entire island of Hispaniola, precluding formal recognition of the Dominican Republic. Fabre Geffrard prioritized internal reforms, reduced the army, and signaled no aggressive intent, even granting a five-year truce to the Dominican side in 1860. Nevertheless, the undefined border remained a persistent source of tension, resulting in incidents such as a brief skirmish in June 1860. Seeking stability after years of internal turmoil, Dominican President Pedro Santana pursued annexation by Spain. After months of preparation, Santana formally announced the incorporation of Santo Domingo as a Spanish province on 18 March 1861. In his proclamation, he invoked traditional anti-Haitian sentiment, blaming past Haitian rule and lauding Dominican valor to rally support for reunification with the "mother country." Geffrard viewed Spain's reassertion of control over its former colony as a direct threat to Haitian independence.

Geffrard responded decisively. On 6 April, he issued a strong proclamation denouncing Spain's claim to Dominican territory as illegitimate and branding Santana's actions treasonous. He asserted Haiti's interest in preserving liberty throughout Hispaniola, effectively reaffirming Haiti's claim to the entire island. This position, known as the "Geffrard Doctrine," echoed the Monroe Doctrine by declaring Haiti's opposition to any foreign-imposed territorial changes on the island. Although largely ignored by European powers, Geffrard's stance resonated within both nations. He escalated on 18 April, condemning Spain as a slaveholding power and urging Dominicans to revolt. Haiti began offering refuge to Dominican patriots and, when the Spanish consul in Port-au-Prince demanded an end to this asylum, Geffrard refused, citing Haiti's sovereign right. He further provoked Spain by supplying weapons to Dominican rebels operating near the border.

These actions prompted a significant Spanish response. In June 1861, Spain dispatched a naval squadron under General Joaquín Gutiérrez de Rubalcava to Port-au-Prince. The fleet demanded compensation for damages allegedly caused by the refugees and a formal salute to the Spanish flag. Facing intense pressure, particularly from British Consul Henry Byron, Geffrard reluctantly agreed to pay a reduced indemnity and perform the flag salute. This concession, however, provoked widespread anger in Haiti and significantly eroded Geffrard's popularity.

=== Education ===
In his first year in office, Geffrard decreed that agricultural schools would be established in each arrondissement (administrative division). He also established the first girls' schools in Haitian history. By 1860, these initiatives had already placed 12,000 children in schools nationwide. In 1864, Geffrard reported that 210 schools were operating, 89 for boys, 21 for girls, and 56 rural schools, and that 14,600 students were being educated.

Secondary education also grew under Geffrard's reign. Secondary schools, or lycées, were established in the larger cities of Port-au-Prince, Cap-Haïtien, Gonaïves, Les Cayes, and Jacmel. Enrollment had grown to 15,697 students by 1865. Still, this represented less than ten percent of Haiti’s school-aged population.

Geffrard's education reforms went beyond primary and secondary education. He improved higher education by modernizing older institutions and establishing new ones. The National School of Medicine was converted into a complete medical school, and a law school and a naval academy were created. In an effort to improve academic standards, Geffrard recruited French professors and sent talented Haitian students abroad to study, including in Paris, at government expense. He also encouraged arts and technical education, establishing a school of fine arts in Port-au-Prince, assisting in the establishment of a school of mines, and promoting engineering education.

=== Opposition and crises ===
President Geffrard initiated his administration in 1859 with a policy of conciliation, leveraging his initial popularity to demonstrate political generosity. He granted amnesty to former opponents and even recognized military honors bestowed upon officers of the previous imperial regime. This early goodwill, however, proved largely ineffective. A significant portion of the deposed officials remained unwilling to cooperate with the new government, driven by a "spirit of ill will" rather than reconciliation. As was typical of personalism in contemporary Latin American politics, loyalty in Haiti centered on influential leaders and individual ambition rather than political ideologies or substantive issues. As a result, national politics remained fickle, with former officials prepared to support any extremist promising the restoration of their lost status and privileges.

In September 1859, the Geffrard regime suffered an attempted coup organized by Guerrier Prophete, the minister of the interior, who was appointed by Geffrard himself. Remarkably, sixteen of the President's trusted aides were aware of the conspiracy; several demonstrated loyalty by warning Geffrard in advance. On 3 September, Prophete fled the capital yet the plot proceeded. That evening, conspirator Sanon, who had studied the President's routine, lay in wait at the home of Geffrard's mother, anticipating his customary visit.

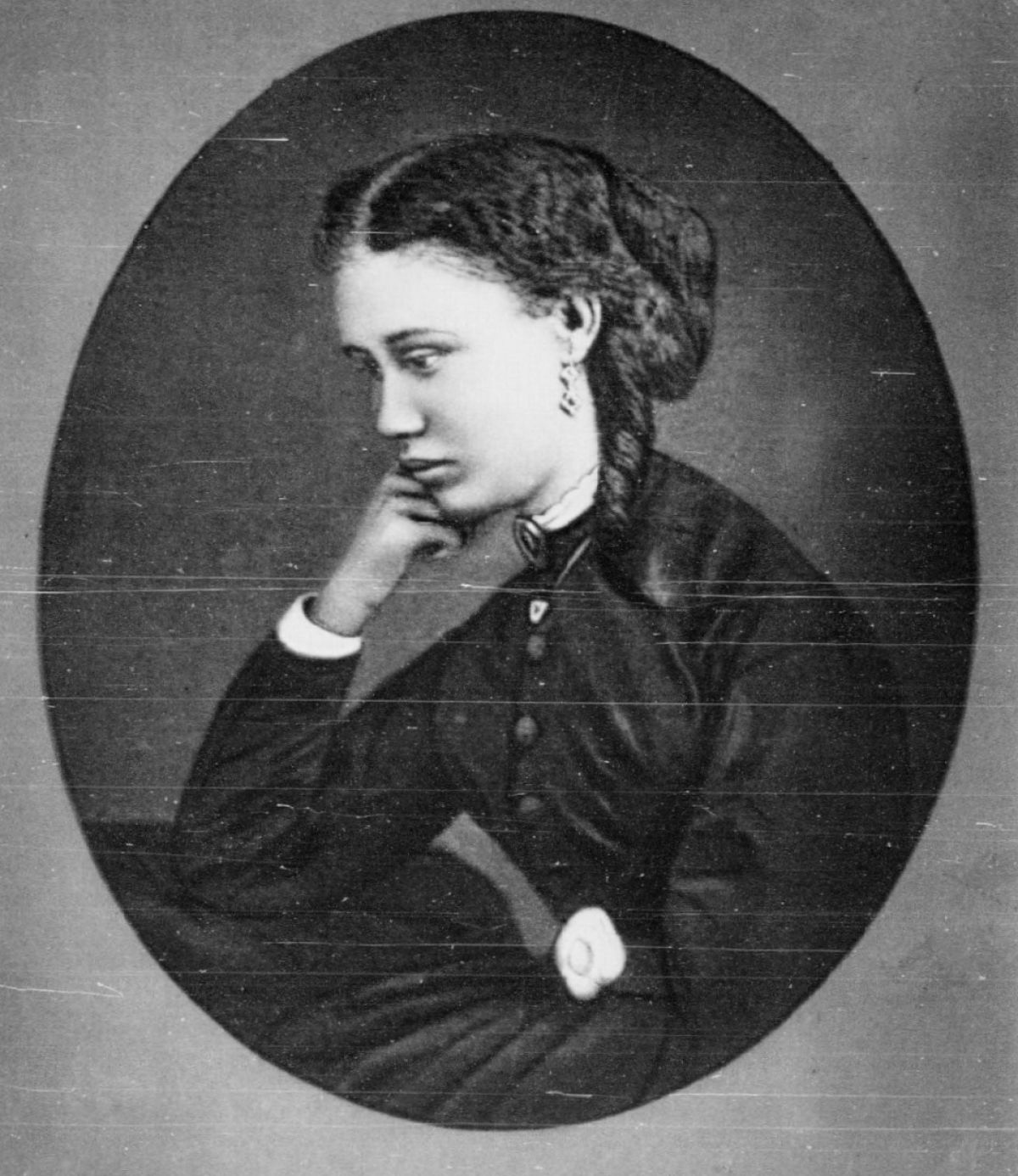
Cora Geffrard, daughter of President Geffrard of Haiti assassinated in 1859.

However, Geffrard had deviated from his routine that day. Tragically, his newly married daughter, Cora Blancfort, who resided there with her husband, was present. Sanon and three accomplices, armed with a blunderbuss, approached the ground-floor dining room where Cora was reading. Raising the Venetian blind slightly, Sanon fired, fatally wounding her. The assassination was intended to lure Geffrard to the scene, where he would be killed, sparking a national uprising. Instead, the National Guard responded swiftly. Geffrard imposed martial law and ordered the arrest of thirty-two suspects. Following nine days of military trials, seventeen conspirators were sentenced to death, three received three-year prison terms, and twelve were acquitted.

Further conspiracies plagued the Geffrard administration. In September 1860, an assassination plot orchestrated by Florosin was uncovered. Concerned that the "psycho-philosophy of rebellion" remained potent, Geffrard conducted an investigative tour of southern Haiti in August 1861. Shortly after forming a new cabinet and replacing General Aimé Legros as minister of police, another plot was revealed at Gonaïves in November 1861. This conspiracy implicated General Léon Legros, father of the dismissed minister, who was arrested; Aimé Legros was expelled from Haiti. Geffrard commuted many sentences due to the plot's minor peril: only about a dozen conspirators received the death penalty, nine were acquitted, and seven were exiled for refusing to testify. The chief conspirator, Legros, received ten years, while the rest received five.

A more significant rebellion erupted in Aux Cayes on 1 May 1862. It was fueled by the pamphlet Une Défense, published in Paris by exiled General Lysius Salomon, which rallied anti-mulatto sentiment. Salomon's father led armed piquets in the north, exploiting ethnic divisions and border tensions. Geffrard responded decisively, deploying troops aboard the steamship 22 de Décembre. The revolt was suppressed, and several leaders, including the elder Salomon, were executed.

By 1863, Geffrard's authority was waning. Facing legislative scrutiny over his personal finances and accusations of enrichment, his government increasingly relied on executive decrees. When the Chamber of Representatives demanded a detailed budget, Geffrard dissolved it by presidential order on 8 June 1863, which shattered his remaining popularity. Subsequent congressional elections saw minimal participation, with scarcely 5,000 of the 200,000 eligible voters casting ballots. Addressing the new assembly on 7 September, Geffrard justified his dissolution as a necessary response to "blind opposition," declaring: "The country waits with a legitimate impatience the reforms and improvements which have been promised... Unity must be the rallying cry."

Instead of unity, widespread revolt became the norm throughout 1864. Uprisings erupted in rapid succession: Lamy Duval rebelled in April; Ogé Longuefosse and Romaine d'Adoubi followed in June. Finally, in July, a major and bloody regional insurrection was launched in the north by Sylvain Salnave, then commander of the presidential guard. Salnave's attempt failed, forcing him to flee to the Dominican Republic.

=== Downfall ===
After an initial failed attempt forced his retreat to the Dominican Republic, Salnave regrouped and crossed back into Haiti with 20 followers on 5 May 1865. He captured Ouanaminthe and advanced toward Cap-Haïtien, capital of the historically rebellious and predominantly Black north. Exploiting regional discontent with Port-au-Prince, Salnave gained widespread support en route. He secured the surrender of Cap-Haïtien's garrison without bloodshed, establishing a provincial government comprising three Black generals and three mulattos, all northerners.

President Geffrard responded decisively. In mid-May, he dispatched a significant force, including elite troops, aboard government steamers under General Nissage Saget. Landing at Saint-Nicolas, government forces secured the area between Cap-Haïtien and Plaisance. General Luberisse then laid siege to Salnave in Cap-Haïtien. The rebellion faced internal divisions and struggled to maintain order, while Geffrard's forces, despite lacking widespread popular support and facing defections, maintained pressure through a blockade aided by a newly acquired corvette.

A critical turning point occurred in October 1865. Rebels captured the government vessel Voldrogne. When the Voldrogne attacked the British-chartered transport Jamaica Packet in Cap-Haïtien's harbor, Commander C. Wake of HMS Bulldog intervened, threatening to sink the rebel ship. Following an attack on the British vice-consulate, Wake returned on 23 October and bombarded the rebel-held port without warning, sinking the Voldrogne and other vessels. The bombardment triggered an explosion in the town's arsenal. Further British ships (HMS Galatea and HMS Lily) arrived and shelled the city.

Exploiting the chaos and the rebels' abandonment of fortifications under fire, Geffrard's troops stormed into Cap-Haïtien. Before fleeing to refuge aboard the USS De Soto, Salnave ordered the city set ablaze. The resulting fire destroyed approximately half of Cap-Haïtien.

The rebellion was crushed, but the victory was pyrrhic. The extensive destruction of Cap-Haïtien and the role of foreign intervention in breaking the siege severely damaged national pride and undermined Geffrard's legitimacy and popularity. His subsequent return to Port-au-Prince was reportedly met with little enthusiasm.

By 1865–1866, Haiti was experiencing severe economic Instability. Five months of closed ports due to the northern rebellion disrupted trade, only slowly reviving. Scarcer revenues led to diminished tax collection. Haiti defaulted on its debt payments to France, failing to meet an 800,000 franc installment due in April 1866, paying only 300,000 francs. Crop failures in 1864 further reduced national income. This economic decline fueled widespread disillusionment. Opposition to Geffrard grew, particularly in the north, where support for the rebel leader Sylvain Salnave, active near the border and reported in Puerto Plata planning another campaign in April 1866, was strong. Executions of rebels in the north only intensified public resentment and spurred retaliatory violence, including arson.

Tensions erupted catastrophically in the capital. On 19 March 1866, a massive fire broke out in Port-au-Prince. Raging for thirty hours without effective firefighting resources, the fires destroyed approximately one thousand buildings, leaving around 9,000 people destitute. This disaster followed another major fire the previous year. Driven by shifting land and sea breezes, the 1866 fire consumed a third of the city, destroying two-thirds of the property valued at an estimated five million dollars. The near-total destruction of European business houses fueled accusations of anti-foreign arson. Widespread looting ensued. Similar, though less successful, arson attempts occurred in Gonaïves and Jérémie. Geffrard, reportedly believing panic would precede revolt, watched helplessly from his palace.

Open revolt flared again in summer 1866, with uprisings in Gonaïves, Hinche, and Saint-Marc. While dissident troops initially aided rebels in Gonaïves, government reinforcements eventually suppressed the revolt. Geffrard's reformist image faded. His 7 April 1866, proclamation of amnesty for rebels and plea for public cooperation to restore progress failed to stem the tide. Economic desperation forced a return to unpopular paper currency, while the fires further crippled trade. Geffrard blamed rebellion for arresting Haiti's development. Later in 1866, citing an alleged assassination plot, Geffrard abandoned conciliatory measures and vowed stronger rule, though he had already lost control of the legislature. American Consul H.E. Peck reported that legislative debates were exposing government wrongs and restoring freedoms previously suppressed by Geffrard. A major explosion destroyed the St. Marc arsenal and 200 houses in September 1866. Discontent coalesced around Salnave, whose forces were seen as a viable alternative. Geffrard's primary defense rested on his elite Presidential Guard, described by British diplomat Sir Spencer St. John as "the only disciplined battalion" he witnessed in Haiti.

The decisive blow came on 23 February 1867, when a detachment of approximately 100 Presidential Guardsmen declared for Salnave. Joined by hundreds of civilians, they seized an arms depot and attacked the National Palace. Geffrard personally led loyal guardsmen in repelling the assault. Rebels then captured a strategic fort overlooking the capital, while widespread looting broke out. Though Geffrard initially held on, replacing his cabinet and promising sweeping reforms that included halving the army, cutting his salary, correcting customs abuses, ensuring thrift, and granting press freedom, the situation was untenable. St. Marc, Gonaïves, and Lascahobas declared for Salnave. Fearing anarchy, Geffrard convened the Senate and resigned. On the night of 12 March 1867, he and his family, disguised, boarded a French sloop bound for Kingston, Jamaica. Before departing, he entrusted executive power to a conciliatory ministry and committee. He is reported to have lamented, "Poor country, what a state of anarchy will follow my departure." The provisional government failed to establish order, and Salnave ascended to the presidency.

== Family ==
Geffrard, with his wife Marguerite Lorvana McIntosh, had several children:

- Laurinska Madiou
- Celimene Cesvet
- Cora Manneville-Blandfort (d. 1859)
- Marguerite Zéïla Geffrard
- Claire Geffrard
- Angèle Dupuy
- Charles Nicholas Clodomir Fabre Geffrard (1833–1859)

== Bibliography ==
- Baur, John (April 1954). "The Presidency of Nicolas Geffrard of Haiti". The Americas. 10 (4). Cambridge University Press: 425–461 – via JSTOR.
- Destin, Yven (Fall 2014). "Haiti's Prized Presidential Legacies". Journal of Haitian Studies. 20 (2): 191–207 – via JSTOR.
- Pamphile, Léon Dénis (2001). Haitians and African Americans: A Heritage of Tragedy and Hope. University Press of Florida. ISBN 9780813031071.

Preceded by Faustin I Emperor of Haiti	President of Haiti; 1859 – 1867	Succeeded by Sylvain Salnave; President of Haiti
