= Sylvain Salnave =

President of Haiti (1827–1870)

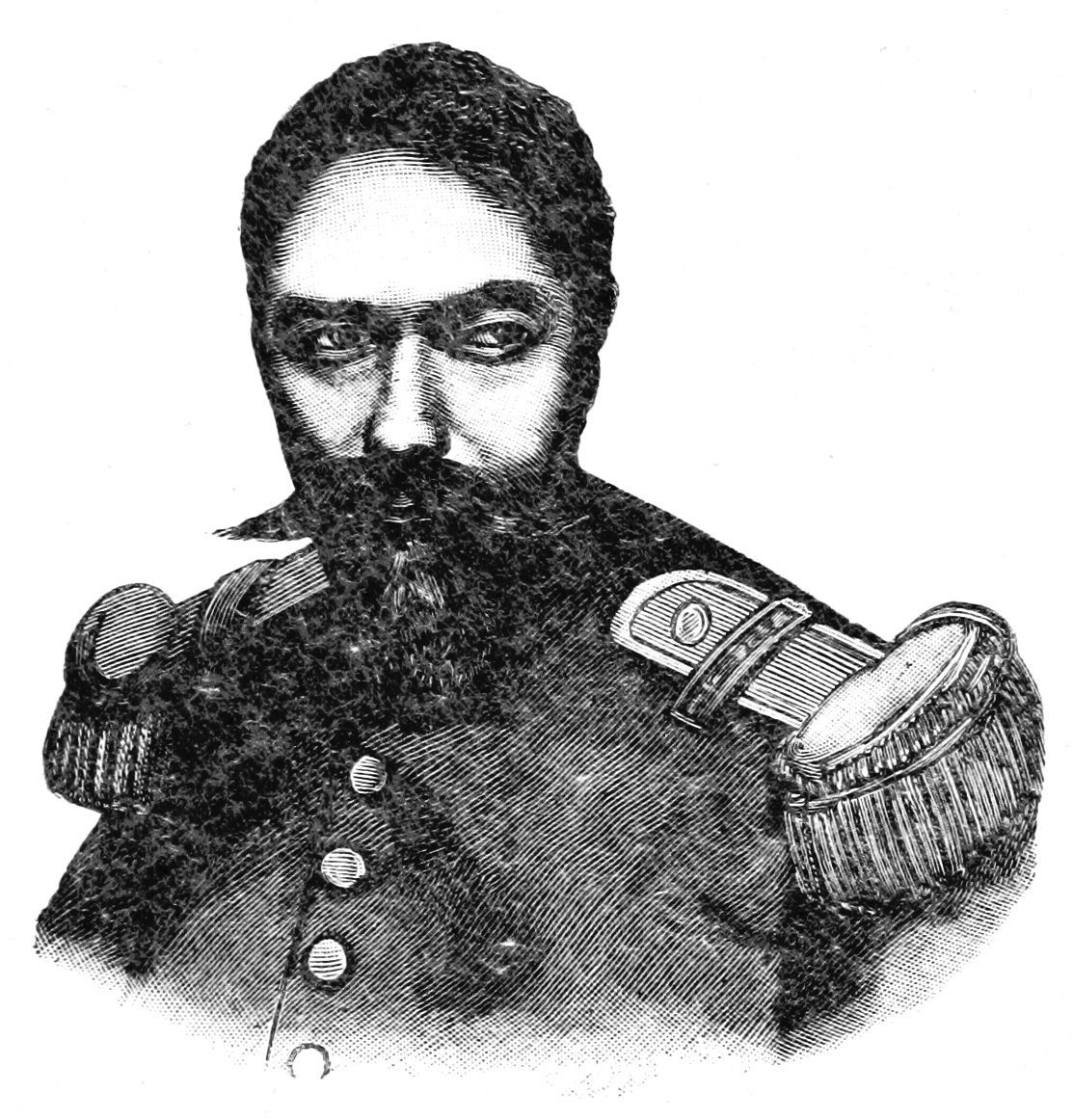

9th President of Haiti
- In office June 14, 1867 – December 19, 1869
- Preceded by: Himself (as President of Haiti)
- Succeeded by: Nissage Saget (as President of Haiti)

7th President of Haiti
- In office 4 May 1867 – 14 June 1867

Protector of the Republic
- In office May 4, 1867 – June 14, 1867
- Preceded by: Nissage Saget
- Succeeded by: Himself

Member of the Provisional Government of Haiti
- In office May 2, 1867 – May 4, 1867
- President: Nissage Saget

Personal details
- Born: February 6, 1827 Cap-Haïtien, Haiti
- Died: January 15, 1870 (aged 42) Port-au-Prince, Haiti
- Spouse: Wilmina Delacourse

Sylvain Salnave (French pronunciation: [silvɛ̃ salnav]; February 6, 1827 – January 15, 1870) was a Haitian general who served as the President of Haïti from 1867 to 1869. He was elected president after he led the overthrow of President Fabre Geffrard. During his term there were constant civil wars between the various factions. Eventually, he was overthrown in a coup by his eventual successor Nissage Saget, and Salnave was tried for treason and executed.

== Early life and career ==
Salnave, a light-skinned mulatto, was born in Cap-Haïtien in 1827. He enlisted in the Haitian Army in 1850. He was captain of cavalry when Fabre Geffrard overthrew Faustin Soulouque in January 1859, and was rewarded for his aid with the rank of major. In 1861, Salnave was bitter in his denunciation of Geffrard for what he called Geffrard's subserviency in the matter of the Spanish regime in neighboring Dominican Republic. Geffrard, whose popularity began to decline, was powerless to punish Salnave. Salnave promoted and encouraged frequent insurrections on the borders, and in 1864 he abetted an insurrection in the northern part of Haiti, but the movement was put down with the aid of the Spanish. In July 1866, Salnave led a new uprising at Gonaïves. Although he was again defeated, the revolt continued to increase. Geffrard resigned the presidency on March 13, 1867, and left for Jamaica, where he spent the remainder of his life.

== President of Haiti ==
After Geffrard's departure the Council of the Secretaries of State became the supreme authority for a time. But in April 1867, Salnave arrived in Port-au-Prince, where he was given a hearty welcome, and on May 2 he became, together with Nissage Saget and Victorin Chevallier, a member of the provisional government which was organized. His adherents were displeased at this distribution of power, and under their pressure he assumed, on May 4, the title of "Protector of the Republic". The attitude of the masses and the growing popularity of Salnave began to occasion much concern to the liberals, who found themselves once more obliged to submit to a military man. This mistrust of their new leader boded ill for the country.

The National Assembly met at Port-au-Prince on May 6, 1867, and on June 14 adopted a Constitution which abolished the Presidency for life, the duration of the authority vested in the Chief of the Executive Power being fixed at four years. On the same day Salnave was elected President of Haiti. He gained the sympathy of the people by his courage and his simple tastes. But he was far from being a liberal; so much so in fact that he was soon at odds with the legislative body, which thought that the time had come to establish the parliamentary system. On October 11, 1867, the rupture with Congress was complete, caused by an interpellation of the Cabinet by the House of Representatives concerning the arrest and imprisonment of General Leon Montas. About that time the peasants had taken up arms at Vallières against Salnave; and the General was charged with being the instigator, if not the leader, of the uprising. The members of the Cabinet openly accused the House of Representatives of being in connivance with the rebels; whereupon the mob invaded the House on October 14 and drove out the Congressmen. This ill-considered act of violence was followed by grave consequences. In the meantime, the President had left for Gonaïves with a view of subduing the insurgents at Vallières, who had assumed the name of "Cacos".

By forcibly ejecting the members of the House of Representatives, Salnave had suspended the Constitution; yet he affected to believe that the opposition he met with was due to his limited authority. Accordingly, on April 22, 1868, he committed yet another blunder by permitting the officers and non-commissioned officers of his army, whose headquarters were at Trou-du-Nord, to form a petition requesting the suspension of the Constitution and dictatorship for the head of the Executive Power. Thus Salnave reestablished the Presidency for life and arrogated unlimited power.

Nissage Saget, who was at that time Commandant of the arrondissement of Saint-Marc, took up arms against this usurpation. Once more frustrated in the hopes of having a government founded on legality and liberty, the country reached one of the most critical periods of its existence, as the insurrection soon became general. Pétion Faubert at Léogâne, Normil at Anse-à-Veau, Michel Domingue at Aquin, and Pierre Théoma Boisrond-Canal at Pétionville and Croix-des-Bouquets all rose up against the dictatorship assumed by Salnave, who was being besieged at Port-au-Prince. The insurgents from the South had their headquarters at Carrefour, at a distance of three leagues from the capital.

Salnave tried to come to terms with them; but failing in his attempt, he determined to rely henceforth on his energy and valor in maintaining his authority. He had the advantage of the unity of command over his opponents; for the rebels in the South had numerous leaders: Domingue, whose headquarters were at Cayes, Normil at Anse-à-Veau, etc.; whilst in the Artibonite, Nissage Saget's authority was fully acknowledged. In consequence of a counter-revolution which occurred at Léogâne and in the mountains of Jacmel, the insurgents were compelled to raise the siege of Port-au-Prince on July 17, 1868. They now felt the necessity of organizing their government; therefore, on September 19, 1868, Nissage Saget was proclaimed at Saint-Marc provisional President, whilst on September 22 Domingue was acknowledged President of the Meridianal State, with headquarters at Cayes.

Salnave's intrepidity gave him for a while all the chances of crushing his foes. He had purchased a steamer in the United States to replace the two men-of-war, Le 22 Décembre and Le Geffrard, which had gone over to the insurgents. The new steamer, which was given the name of Alexandre Pétion, arrived at Port-au-Prince on September 19, 1868. The next day Salnave went on board and sailed for Petit-Goâve, in which harbor the two steamers belonging to the rebels were anchored. The Alexandre Pétion opened fire on Le 22 Décembre, which was sunk; the commandant of Le Geffrard blew up his ship so as to prevent her being captured.

This success made Salnave master of Petit-Goave, which town the insurgents were compelled to evacuate. In February 1869, the whole of the Southern Department was once more under his authority, with the exception of Jérémie and Cayes, which were closely surrounded. From Camp-Boudet, where he had established his headquarters, he personally directed the siege of Cayes, of which eventually he would have taken possession had not fortunes of war gone contrary to his plan in the Artibonite. His principal lieutenant, General Victorin Chevallier, had been obliged to evacuate Gonaïves, which was occupied by Saget's troops. On their arrival at Port-au-Prince Chevallier's soldiers created such disturbances that Salnave had to leave Camp-Boudet hurriedly for the capital, where he arrived on September 1, 1869. He had also at that time to fight the opposition of the Catholic clergy. On June 28 he had summarily dismissed Martial-Guillaume-Marie Testard du Cosquer, the Archbishop of Port-au-Prince; and had taken the same measure against Alexis-Jean-Marie Guilloux, the Vicar-General, on October 16.

Salnave's position was getting worse; one of his most faithful followers, General Victorin Chevallier, Secretary of War, who was in command of the army surrounding Jacmel, deserted his cause in November and joined the insurrection. Salnave now began to reflect that he might yet be able to allay the discontent reigning throughout the country by relinquishing the absolute power he had usurped. In August 1869, he appointed a Legislative Council. This body met in November and, reestablishing the Presidency for life assumed by Salnave, reenacted the Constitution of 1846. But it was too late to be of avail and the abolition of the dictatorship was powerless in saving the Government; for Cap-Haitien and the whole department of the Northwest had already joined the cause of the insurrection. A bold attack on Port-au-Prince at length put an end to this civil war. On December 16, 1869, Generals Georges Brice and Boisrond-Canal landed at the capital at the head of 1,200 soldiers; in the night they had surprised the Government man-of-war La Terreur. During the fight which ensued this ship began bombarding the Executive Mansion; a shot struck the powder magazine, causing it to explode just after Salnave had left the place. Salnave succeeded in reaching the Dominican territory; but General José María Cabral, who was in sympathy with his opponents, betraying the trust he had placed in him, gave him up to the Haitians.

On January 15, 1870, Salnave arrived at Port-au-Prince, where he appeared before a court martial. He was sentenced to death and shot on the same day at six o'clock in the evening, tied to a pole set up on the smoking ruins of the Executive Mansion.

== Footnotes ==
Political offices
Preceded by Nissage Saget (acting)	President of Haïti; 1867–1869	Succeeded by Nissage Saget
