= HMS Lily (1837) =

British naval ship

- Lily

History

United Kingdom
- Name: Lily
- Namesake: Lily
- Ordered: 10 July 1832
- Builder: Pembroke Dockyard
- Laid down: December 1835
- Launched: 28 September 1837
- Completed: 12 March 1838
- Commissioned: 15 December 1837
- Fate: Sold for scrap, 7 April 1904

General characteristics
- Class & type: Racer-class brig-sloop
- Tons burthen: 432 17/94 bm
- Length: 100 ft 6 in (30.6 m) (Gun deck); 78 ft 9 in (24.0 m) (Keel)
- Beam: 32 ft 6 in (9.9 m)
- Draught: 12 ft 4 in (3.8 m)
- Depth: 15 ft 3 in (4.6 m)
- Complement: 110
- Armament: 2 × 9-pdr cannon; 14 × 32-pdr carronades

HMS Lily was a 16-gun Racer-class brig-sloop built for the Royal Navy during the 1830s.

== Description ==
Lily had a length at the gundeck of 100 feet 6 inches (30.6 m) and 78 feet 9 inches (24.0 m) at the keel. She had a beam of 32 feet 6 inches (9.9 m), a draught of 12 feet 4 inches (3.8 m) and a depth of hold of 15 feet 3 inches (4.6 m). The ship's tonnage was 432 17/94 tons burthen. The Racer class was armed with a pair of 9-pounder (or 18-pounder) cannon and fourteen 32-pounder carronades. The ships had a crew of 120 officers and ratings.

== Construction and career ==
Lily, the fifth ship of her name to serve in the Royal Navy, was ordered on 10 July 1832, laid down in December 1835 at Pembroke Dockyard, Wales, and launched on 29 September 1837. She was completed on 12 March 1838 at Plymouth Dockyard and commissioned on 15 December 1837.
