= Vice President of Haiti =

Former political position

Vice President of Haiti (French: Vice-président d'Haïti) was a former political position in Haiti. It was formally established the first and so far the only time in 1874.

The position was formally established in the Constitution of Haiti in August 1874, a new version of the constitution to replace an earlier version. The presidential term was changed to eight years and a vice president position with executive powers was established.

An office of a jointly-elected Vice President, intended to replace the office of Prime Minister, was proposed by Jovenel Moïse in a draft constitution which he intended to submit for ratification, but his 2021 assassination indefinitely paused its reintroduction.

== List of officeholders ==
Portrait	Name (Birth–Death)	Took office	Left office	President	Notes
	Michel Domingue (1813–1877)	27 December 1869	16 March 1870	Nissage Saget	Vice President of the provisional government
	Septimus Rameau (1826–1876)	10 September 1874	15 April 1876†	Michel Domingue	Died of injuries sustained during riots
