= President of Haiti =

Head of state

President of the Republic of Haiti
- Président de la République d'Haïti (French); Prezidan Repiblik Ayiti (Haitian Creole)
- Presidential standard
- Incumbent; Vacant since 7 July 2021
- Executive branch of the Government of Haiti
- Residence: National Palace
- Seat: Port-au-Prince, Haiti
- Term length: Five years; renewable once
- Constituting instrument: Constitution of Haiti (2012)
- Precursor: Emperor of Haiti
- Formation: February 17, 1807 (219 years ago)
- First holder: Jean Jacques Dessalines
- Succession: Line of succession
- Deputy: Prime Minister
- Salary: 250,000 Gourdes per month
- Website: lapresidence.ht

The president of Haiti (Haitian Creole: Prezidan peyi Ayiti, French: Président d'Haïti), officially called the president of the Republic of Haiti (French: Président de la République d'Haïti, Haitian Creole: Prezidan Repiblik Ayiti, pronounced [pɣezidã ɣepiblik ajiti]), is the head of state of Haiti. Executive power in Haiti is divided between the president and the government, which is headed by the prime minister of Haiti.^{[A133]}

Due to an ongoing political crisis in Haiti, the Transitional Presidential Council began exercising the powers of the presidency on 25 April 2024. However, it dissolved as scheduled after no presidential election was held. Its act expired on 7 February 2026.

== Term and election ==
A number of qualifications for the presidency are specified by Chapter III, Section A (Articles 134 and 135) of the 1987 Constitution of Haiti.

The president is elected to a five-year term by popular vote. The president may not be elected to consecutive terms; they may serve a second term only after an interval of five years, and can not run for a third term.^{[A134]}

To be elected president, a candidate must:^{[A135]}

1. Be a native-born Haitian and never have renounced nationality;
2. Be 35 years old by election day;
3. Enjoy civil and political rights, and not have been sentenced to death, penal servitude, or the loss of civil rights for a crime;
4. Be the owner of real property and have one's habitual residence in the country;
5. Reside in the country at least five years before election day;
6. Have been discharged of responsibilities if he previously handled public funds.

Elections are held on the last Sunday in November in the fifth year of a president's term. However, in actuality Election Day is not fixed, per the election held in 2015. If no candidate receives a majority of the vote, a runoff is held between the top two candidates. The runoff candidate with the highest number of votes becomes president.^{[A134]}

Each presidential term is supposed to begin and end on the February 7 immediately following the last presidential election. However, this has not always been observed, as when Michel Martelly became president on May 11, 2011.^{[A134]}

Since 1950, the president is elected by universal suffrage of all citizens. Previously, civilian presidents were elected by the Chamber of Deputies.

== Duties and powers ==
Other qualifications for the presidency are specified by Articles 136 to 147, part of Chapter III, Section B of the 1987 Constitution. The president has no powers except those accorded to him in the Constitution.^{[A150]}

The Constitution mandates that the president see to:

1. respect for and enforcement of the Constitution and the stability of government institutions;
2. regular operations of public entities;
3. the continuity of the State;^{[A136]}; and
4. the nation's independence and the integrity of its territory.^{[A138]}

When there exists a majority in Parliament in favor of a new government, the President must choose a prime minister from the majority party; otherwise, he chooses one after consultation with the two houses of Parliament. In either case, the choice must then be ratified by Parliament. The president terminates the duties of the prime minister when the Government resigns.^{[A137]}

The president declares war and negotiates and signs peace treaties with the approval of the National Assembly,^{[A140]} and signs all international treaties, conventions, and agreements, submitting them to the National Assembly for ratification.^{[A139]} The president also accredits ambassadors and special envoys to foreign nations, receives letters of accreditation from ambassadors of foreign powers, and issues exequaturs to recognize consuls.^{[A139-1]}

With the approval of the Senate, the president appoints the generalissimo of the Haitian armed forces and of the Haitian police forces, as well as Haiti's ambassadors and consuls to foreign states.^{[A141]} The president is himself the commander-in-chief of the armed services.^{[A143]}

With the approval of the Council of Ministers, the president appoints the directors-general of the civil service, as well as delegates and vice-delegates of various departments and arrondissements. ^{[A142]}

The president ratifies laws, and has the right to choose between ratifying a law or not. ^{[A144]}

The president may reduce or commute sentences in all res judicata cases, except ones imposed by Supreme Court judges. The president, however, may not grant amnesty to non-political prisoners.^{[A146]}^{[A147]}

== Residence ==
The National Palace in the capital Port-au-Prince served as the official residence of the president of Haiti,^{[A153]} but was severely damaged in the 2010 Haiti earthquake, and was demolished in 2012. In place of the National Palace, President Jovenel Moïse used his home at Pelerin 5 in Pétion-Ville as a temporary presidential palace before relocating to another home in the Juventas area.

== Line of succession ==
Under the 1987 constitution, the presidential line of succession went first to the president of the Supreme Court of Haiti, then to the vice-president of the court, and then to puisne judges in order of seniority. An election for president was required within three months of a vacancy occurring, and the acting president could not run for the office. This provision was amended in 2011–2012 to remove all judges from the presidential line of succession, instead designating the Council of Ministers, under the Presidency of the prime minister.^{[A119]}

== See also ==
- List of heads of state of Haiti
- Prime Minister of Haiti
- List of prime ministers of Haiti
- Vice President of Haiti

== Notes ==
[A___] citations are Article numbers of the 1987 Constitution of the Republic of Haiti. A government-issued but unofficial (and error-prone) English translation is available at http://www.unhcr.org/refworld/docid/3ae6b542c.html and http://pdba.georgetown.edu/Constitutions/Haiti/haiti1987.html and the French original is available at http://pdba.georgetown.edu/Constitutions/Haiti/haiti1987fr.html

== Sources ==
- Schutt-Ainé, Patricia (1994). Haiti: A Basic Reference Book. Miami, Florida: Librairie Au Service de la Culture. p. 165. ISBN 0-9638599-0-0.
