= List of foreign ministers of Haiti =

This is a list of foreign ministers of Haiti.

== List ==
- February 1807 - 6 December 1812: Joseph Rouanez
- December 1812 - May 1820: Julien Prévost
- 4 April 1843 - 7 January 1844: Philippe Guerrier
- 7 January 1844 - 3 May 1844: Hérard Dumesle
- 3 May 1844 - 1 March 1846: Jacques Hyppolite
- 2 March 1846 - 27 July 1847: Alexis Dupuy
- 27 July 1847 - 30 September 1847: Jean Elie
- 30 September 1847 - 9 April 1848: Alexis Dupuy (2nd term)
- 9 April 1848 - 26 December 1848: Lysius Salomon
- 31 December 1848 - 15 January 1859: Louis Dufrène
- 17 January 1859 - 28 January 1860: André Jean-Simon
- 28 January 1860 - 8 July 1862: Victorin Plésance
- 8 July 1862 - 13 August 1866: Théodate Philippeaux
- 13 August 1866 - 7 March 1867: Thomas Madiou
- 7 March 1867 - 13 March 1867: Linstant de Pradines
- 8 May 1867 - 21 July 1867: André Germain
- 21 July 1867 - 20 May 1868: Demesvar Delorme
- 20 May 1868 - 3 August 1868: Daguesseau Lespinasse
- 3 August 1868 - 19 February 1869: Alexandre Tate
- 19 February 1869 - 6 September 1869: Charles Archin
- 6 September 1869 - 29 December 1869: Dasny Labonté
- 29 December 1869 - 23 March 1870: Sauveur Faubert
- 23 March 1870 - 7 May 1870: Benomy Lallemand
- 7 May 1870 - 27 June 1870: Sauveur Faubert (2nd term)
- 27 June 1870 - 11 May 1871: Volmar Laporte
- 11 May 1871 - 19 June 1871: Normil Sambour
- 19 June 1871 - 29 June 1871: Charles Haentjens
- 29 June 1871 - 31 December 1871: Darius Denis
- 2 January 1872 - 9 May 1873: Liautaud Ethéart
- 9 May 1873 - 8 July 1873: Octavius Rameau (a. i.)
- 8 July 1873 - 15 June 1874: Joseph Lamothe
- 15 June 1874 - 15 April 1876: Raoul Excellent
- 24 April 1876 - 20 July 1876: Hannibal Price
- 20 July 1876 - 23 August 1877: Liautaud Ethéart (2nd term)
- 23 August 1877 - 1 September 1878: Félix Carrié
- 1 September 1878 - 14 November 1878: Louis Michel Roumain
- 14 November 1878 - 1 September 1879: Liautaud Ethéart (3rd term)
- 1 September 1879 - 3 October 1879: Joseph Lamothe
- 3 October 1879 - 23 October 1879: Lysius Salomon (3rd term)
- 3 November 1879 - 26 August 1881: Charles Laforesterie
- 26 August 1881 - 31 December 1881: Brutus Saint-Victor
- 31 December 1881 - 20 August 1883: Jean-Baptiste Damier
- 20 August 1883 - 13 March 1884: Callisthène Fouchard
- 14 March 1884 - 10 August 1888: Brutus Saint-Victor (2nd term)
- 1 September 1888 - 16 October 1888: François Denys Légitime
- 16 October 1888 - 19 December 1888: Osman Piquant
- 19 December 1888 - 20 June 1889: Eugène Margron
- 20 June 1889 - 3 August 1889: Solon Ménos
- 3 August 1889 - 3 May 1891: Anténor Firmin
- 3 May 1891 - 19 August 1891: Hugon Lechaud
- 19 August 1891 - 11 August 1892: Charles Archin (2nd term)
- 11 August 1892 - 19 May 1894: Edmond Lespinasse
- 19 May 1894 - 27 December 1894: Frédéric Marcelin
- 27 December 1894 - 17 December 1896: Pourcely Faine
- 17 December 1896 - 26 July 1897: Anténor Firmin (2nd term)
- 26 July 1897 - 13 December 1897: Solon Ménos
- 13 December 1897 - 12 May 1902: Brutus Saint-Victor (3rd term)
- 20 May 1902 - 4 April 1903: Cadet Jérémie
- 4 April 1903 - 30 June 1903: August e Bonamy
- 30 June 1903 - 21 May 1906: Murville Férère
- 21 May 1906 - 17 February 1908: Horace Pauleus Sannon
- 14 March 1908 - 30 November 1908: Louis Borno
- 8 December 1908 - 19 December 1908: J.J.F. Magny
- 19 December 1908 - 15 February 1910: Murat Claude
- 15 February 1910 - 20 July 1911: Pétion Pierre-André
- 20 July 1911 - 2 August 1911: Cadet Jérémie (2nd term)
- 4 August 1911 - 16 August 1911: Tertulien Guilbaud
- 16 August 1911 - 4 May 1913: Jacques Nicolas Léger
- 17 May 1913 - 8 February 1914: Etienne Mathon
- 8 February 1914 - 10 May 1914: Jacques Nicolas Léger (2nd term)
- 10 May 1914 - 11 November 1914: Enoch Désert
- 11 November 1914 - 12 December 1914: Justin Joseph
- 12 December 1914 - 16 February 1915: Louis Borno (2nd term)
- 16 February 1915 - 27 February 1915: Cadet Jérémie (3rd term)
- 27 February 1915 - 9 March 1915: August e Bonamy (2nd term)
- 9 March 1915 - 27 July 1915: Ulrick Duvivier
- 14 August 1915 - 9 September 1915: Horace Pauleus Sannon (2nd term)
- 9 September 1915 - 17 April 1917: Louis Borno (3rd term)
- 17 April 1917 - 3 July 1917: Furcy Châtelain
- 3 July 1917 - 20 June 1918: Edmond Dupuy
- 20 June 1918 - 19 December 1918: Louis Borno (4th term)
- 19 December 1918 - 17 October 1919: Constantin Benoit
- 17 October 1919 - 15 May 1922: Justin Barau
- 15 May 1922 - 27 November 1922: Léon Déjean
- 27 November 1922 - 27 September 1923: Félix Magloire
- 27 September 1923 - 20 October 1924: Camille Léon
- 20 October 1924 - 17 March 1926: Léon Déjean (2nd term)
- 17 March 1926 - 20 April 1926: Georges Gentil
- 20 April 1926 - 15 November 1926: Edmond Montas
- 15 November 1926 - 25 November 1929: Camille Léon (2nd term)
- 25 November 1929 - 15 May 1930: Antoine Sansaricq
- 15 May 1930 - 19 August 1930: Frédéric Bernardin
- 19 August 1930 - 22 November 1930: Emmanuel Volel
- 22 November 1930 - 18 May 1931: Horace Pauléus Sannon (3rd term)
- 18 May 1931 - 15 July 1932: Abel Nicolas Léger
- 15 July 1932 - 20 September 1933: Albert Blanchet
- 20 September 1933 - 24 December 1934: Léon Laleau
- 24 December 1934 - 16 March 1935: Lucien Hibbert
- 16 March 1935 - 10 October 1936: Yrech Châtelain
- 10 October 1936 - 15 September 1938: Georges Léger
- 15 September 1938 - 10 October 1940: Léon Laleau (2nd term)
- 10 October 1940 - 15 May 1941: Fernand Dennis
- 15 May 1941 - 9 June 1942: Charles Fombrun
- 9 June 1942 - 21 May 1943: Serge Défly
- 21 May 1943 - 11 January 1946: Gérard Lescot
- 12 January 1946 - 16 August 1946: Antoine Levelt
- 19 August 1946 - 10 April 1947: Jean Price Mars
- 10 April 1947 - 26 November 1948: Edmée Manigat
- 26 November 1948 - 14 October 1949: Timoléon C. Brutus
- 14 October 1949 - 10 May 1950: Vilfort Beauvoir
- 10 May 1950 - 6 December 1950: Antoine Levelt (2nd term)
- 6 December 1950 - 29 February 1952: Jacques Léger
- 29 February 1952 - 1 April 1953: Albert Ethéart
- 1 April 1953 - 31 July 1954: Pierre Liautaud
- 31 July 1954 - 6 September 1955: Mauclair Zephirin
- 6 September 1955 - 14 December 1956: Joseph D. Charles
- 14 December 1956 - 9 February 1957: Jean Price Mars (2nd term)
- 9 February 1957 - 2 April 1957: Evremont Carrié
- 6 April 1957 - 25 May 1957: Vilfort Beauvoir (2nd term)
- 27 May 1957 - 14 June 1957: Joseph Buteau
- 14 June 1957 - 22 October 1957: Louis Roumain
- 22 October 1957 - 17 June 1958: Vilfort Beauvoir (3rd term)
- 17 June 1958 - 19 December 1959: Louis Mars
- 19 December 1959 - 25 October 1960: Raymond A. Moyse
- 25 October 1960 - 30 May 1961: Joseph Baguidy
- 30 May 1961 - 22 April 1971: René Chalmers
- 22 April 1971 - 20 March 1974: Adrien Raymond
- 20 March 1974 - 3 November 1978: Edner Brutus
- 3 November 1978 - 13 November 1979: Gérard Dorcely
- 13 November 1979 - 5 January 1981: Georges Salomon
- 5 January 1981 - 3 February 1982: Edouard Francisque
- 3 February 1982 - 30 December 1985: Jean-Robert Estimé
- 30 December 1985 - 7 February 1986: Georges Salomon (2nd term)
- 7 February 1986 - 24 March 1986: Jacques A. François
- 24 March 1986 - 5 January 1987: Jean-Baptiste Hilaire
- 5 January 1987 - 7 February 1988: Hérard Abraham
- 12 February 1988 - 20 June 1988: Gérard Latortue
- 20 June 1988 - 18 September 1988: Hérard Abraham (2nd term)
- 18 September 1988 - 12 May 1989: Serge Elie Charles
- 12 May 1989 - 16 March 1990: Yvon Perrier
- 16 March 1990 - 24 August 1990: Kesler Clermont
- 24 August 1990 - 27 September 1990: Alec Toussaint
- 27 September 1990 - 7 February 1991: Paul C. Latortue
- 19 February 1991 - 19 September 1991: Marie-Denise Fabien Jean-Louis (f)
- 19 September 1991 - 30 September 1991: Jean-Robert Sabalat
- 15 October 1991 - 16 December 1991: Jean-Jacques Honorat
- 16 December 1991 - 19 June 1992: Jean-Robert Simonise
- 19 June 1992 - 1 September 1993: François Benoît
- 1 September 1993 - 16 May 1994: Claudette Werleigh (f)
- 16 May 1994 - 8 November 1994: Charles Anthony David
- 8 November 1994 - 7 November 1995: Claudette Werleigh (f) (2nd term)
- 7 November 1995 - 2 March 2001: Fritz Longchamp
- 2 March 2001 - 29 February 2004: Philippe Antonio Joseph
- 17 March 2004 - 28 January 2005: Yvon Siméon
- 28 January 2005 - 9 June 2006: Hérard Abraham (3rd term)
- 9 June 2006 - 5 September 2008: Rénald Clérismé
- 5 September 2008 - November 2009: Alrich Nicolas
- November 2009 - 24 October 2011: Marie-Michèle Rey
- 24 October 2011 - 6 August 2012: Laurent Lamothe
- 6 August 2012 - 2 April 2014: Pierre-Richard Casimir
- 2 April 2014 - 27 April 2015: Duly Brutus
- 27 April 2015 - 23 March 2016: Lener Reneaud
- 23 March 2016 - 13 March 2017: Pierrot Delienne
- 13 March 2017 - 5 September 2018 : Antonio Rodrigue
- 5 September 2018 - 4 March 2020: Bocchit Edmond
- 4 March 2020 - 25 November 2021: Claude Joseph
- 25 November 2021 - 24 April 2024: Jean Victor Généus
- 12 June 2024 - 16 November 2024: Dominique Dupuy
- 16 November 2024 - 2026: Jean-Victor Harvel Jean-Baptiste
- 2026 - present: Raina Forbin

== See also ==
- Haiti
- Ministry of Foreign Affairs (Haiti)
  - List of heads of state of Haiti
  - Prime Minister of Haiti
  - List of colonial governors of Saint-Domingue
- Lists of Incumbents

== Sources ==
- Rulers.org – Foreign ministers E–K
