= List of finance ministers of Haiti =

The following is a list of finance ministers of Haiti.

== List ==
- 1 January 1804 - January 1807: André Vernet
- 19 January 1807 - October 1807: Bruno Blanchet
- November 1807 - July 1808: César Thélémaque
- 26 July 1808 - November 1808: Jean-Chrisostôme Imbert
- 30 November 1808 - 1 May 1810: Guy Joseph Bonnet
- 9 May 1810 - 20 February 1842 : Jean-Chrisostôme Imbert
- 20 February 1842 - 13 March 1843:
- 14 March 1843 - 4 April 1843: Jean-Bernard Bédouet
- 4 April 1843 - 1 February 1844: Jean-Chrisostôme Imbert
- 1 February 1844 - 18 February 1845: André Laudun
- 18 February 1845 - 1 March 1846: Louis Detré
- 1 March 1846 - 9 March 1846: Jean Elie
- 9 March 1846 - 3 April 1847: Louis Detré
- 3 April 1847 - 27 July 1847: Alexis Dupuy
- 27 July 1847 - 30 September 1847: Jean Elie
- 30 September 1847 - 9 April 1848: Alexis Dupuy
- 9 April 1848 - 15 January 1859: Lysius Salomon, duc de Saint-Louis-du-Sud
- 17 January 1859 - 8 July 1862: Victorin Plésance
- 8 July 1862 - 23 January 1864: Alexis Dupuy
- 24 January 1864 - 26 October 1866: Auguste Elie
- 26 October 1866 - 7 March 1867: Welson Woël
- 7 March 1867 - 13 March 1867: Dorfeuille Laborde
- 8 May 1867 - 15 February 1868: André GerMayn
- 15 February 1868 - 3 August 1868: Daguesseau Lespinasse
- 3 August 1868 - 19 February 1869: Alexandre Tate
- 19 February 1869 - 31 August 1869: Raoul Excellent
- 6 September 1869 - 29 November 1869: Nodélus Saint-Amand
- 29 November 1869 - 19 December 1869: Alfred Delva
- 29 December 1869 - 23 March 1870: Thimogène Rameau
- 23 March 1870 - 7 May 1870: Benomy Lallemand
- 7 May 1870 - 23 June 1870: Sauveur Faubert
- 23 June 1870 - 27 April 1871: Volmar Laporte
- 27 April 1871 - 11 May 1871: Septimus Rameau
- 11 May 1871 - 19 June 1871: Normil Sambour
- 19 June 1971 - 29 June 1871: Charles Haentjens
- 29 June 1871 - 31 December 1871: Darius Denis
- 2 January 1872 - 9 May 1873: Liautaud Ethéart
- 9 May 1873 - 8 July 1873: Octavius Rameau (a. i.)
- 8 July 1873 - 13 May 1874: Charles Haentjens
- 13 May 1874 - 24 April 1876: Raoul Excellent
- 25 April 1876 - 20 July 1876: Hannibal Price
- 20 July 1876 - 16 August 1877: Liautaud Ethéart
- 16 August 1877 - 24 August 1877: Dalbémar Jean-Joseph
- 24 August 1877 - 17 July 1878: Félix Carrié
- 17 July 1878 - 14 November 1878: Ernest RouMayn
- 14 November 1878 - 17 July 1879: Liautaud Ethéart
- 1 September 1879 - 3 October 1879: Joseph Lamothe
- 3 October 1879 - 3 November 1879: Lysius Salomon
- 3 November 1879 - 26 August 1881: Charles Laforesterie
- 26 August 1881 - 31 December 1881: Brutus Saint-Victor
- 31 December 1881 - 20 August 1883: Jean-Baptiste Damier
- 20 August 1883 - 10 August 1888: Callisthène Fouchard
- 1 September 1888 - 19 December 1888: Ultimo Saint-Amand
- 19 December 1888 - 31 May 1889: Alix Rossignol
- 31 May 1889 - 10 August 1889: Solon Ménos
- 1 September 1889 - 29 October 1889: Saint-Martin Dupuy (a. i.)
- 29 October 1889 - 3 May 1891: Anténor Firmin
- 3 May 1891 - 1 July 1891: Hugon Lechaud
- 1 July 1891 - 11 August 1892 : Pierre-Antoine Stewart
- 11 August 1892 - 27 December 1894: Frédéric Marcelin
- 27 December 1894 - 17 December 1896: Callisthène Fouchard
- 17 December 1896 - 26 July 1897: Anténor Firmin
- 26 July 1897 - 13 December 1897: Solon Ménos
- 13 December 1897 - 17 January 1898: Victorin Plésance
- 17 January 1898 - 17 August 1899: Stéphen Lafontant
- 17 August 1899 - 17 January 1900: Hérard Roy
- 17 January 1900 - 12 May 1902: Pourcely Faine
- 20 May 1902 - 21 December 1902: Charles Dennery
- 22 December 1902 - 4 April 1903: Diogène Délinois
- 4 April 1903 - 30 June 1903: Edmond Lespinasse
- 30 June 1903 - 4 August 1903: Murville Férère (a. i.)
- 4 August 1903 - 4 November 1904: Cajuste Bijou
- 4 November 1904 - 10 April 1905: Constant Gentil
- 10 April 1905 - 1 December 1908: Frédéric Marcelin
- 8 December 1908 - 19 December 1908: Luders Chapoteau
- 19 December 1908 - 14 July 1909: Edmond Héreaux
- 14 July 1909 - 15 February 1910: Candelon Rigaud
- 15 February 1910 - 20 June 1910: Louis-Edouard Pouget
- 20 June 1910 - 29 October 1910: Pétion Pierre-André
- 29 October 1910 - 19 December 1910: Septimus Marius
- 19 December 1910 - 20 July 1911: Murat Claude
- 20 July 1911 - 4 August 1911: Tertilus Nicolas
- 4 August 1911 - 16 August 1911: Antoine Sansaricq
- 16 August 1911 - 4 May 1913: Edmond Lespinasse
- 17 May 1913 - 8 February 1914: Auguste Bonamy
- 8 February 1914 - 10 May 1914: Edmond Lespinasse
- 10 May 1914 - 11 November 1914: Candelon Rigaud
- 11 November 1914 - 14 November 1914: Rosalvo Bobo
- 14 November 1914 - 20 November 1914: Diogène Délinois
- 20 November 1914 - 12 December 1914: Daguesseau Montreuil
- 12 December 1914 - 16 January 1915: Edmond Héreaux
- 16 January 1915 - 17 February 1915: Diogène Délinois
- 27 February 1915 - 9 March 1915: Darius Bourand
- 9 March 1915 - 27 July 1915: Auguste Bonamy
- 14 August 1915 - 2 May 1916: Emile Elie
- 9 May 1916 - 20 June 1918: Edmond Héreaux
- 20 June 1918 - 19 December 1918: Louis Borno
- 19 December 1918 - 30 November 1920: Fleury Féquière
- 31 November 1918 - 15 May 1922: Jean Charles Pressoir
- 15 May 1922 - 18 December 1922: Louis Ethéart
- 18 December 1822 - 27 September 1923: James McGuffie
- 27 September 1923 - 20 October 1924: Auguste C. Magloire
- 20 October 1924 - 21 August 1925: Fernand Dennis
- 21 August 1925 - 24 August 1925: Léon Déjean (a. i.)
- 24 August 1925 - 20 April 1926: Emile Marcelin
- 20 April 1926 - 30 August 1928: Charles Rouzier
- 30 August 1928 - 30 August 1929: Joseph Lanoue
- 30 August 1929 - 25 November 1929: Antoine Sansaricq
- 25 November 1929 - 15 May 1930: Francis Salgado
- 15 May 1930 - 19 August 1930: Franck Roy
- 19 August 1930 - 22 November 1930: Georges Régnier
- 22 November 1930 - 18 May 1931: Perceval Thoby
- 18 May 1931 - 17 May 1932: Ernest Douyon
- 17 May 1932 - 15 July 1932: Clovis Kernizan
- 15 July 1932 - 15 May 1934: Lucien Hibbert
- 15 May 1934 - 24 December 1934: Christian Laporte
- 24 December 1934 - 16 March 1935: Yrech Châtelain
- 16 March 1935 - 17 August 1935: Leroy Chassaing
- 17 August 1935 - 10 October 1936: Mont-Rosier Déjean
- 10 October 1936 - 15 September 1938: Georges N. Léger
- 15 September 1938 - 10 October 1940: Mont-Rosier Déjean
- 10 October 1940 - 15 May 1941: Fernand Dennis
- 15 May 1941 - 11 January 1946: Abel Lacroix
- 12 January 1946 - 16 August 1946: Alcide Duviella
- 19 August 1946 - 8 December 1947: Gaston Margron
- 8 December 1947 - 26 November 1948: Emmanuel Thézan
- 26 November 1848 - 6 May 1950: Noé Fourcand fils
- 6 May 1950 - 10 May 1950: Carlet Auguste
- 10 May 1950 - 12 May 1950: Daniel Bouchereau (a. i.)
- 12 May 1950 - 29 February 1952: François Georges
- 29 February 1952 - 1 April 1953: Alexandre Dominique
- 1 April 1953 - 31 July 1954: Lucien Hibbert
- 31 July 1954 - 29 August 1956: Clément Jumelle
- 29 August 1956 - 14 December 1956: Alain Turnier
- 14 December 1956 - 9 February 1957: Paul Cassagnol
- 9 February 1957 - 2 April 1957: Francis Salgado
- 6 April 1957 - 25 May 1957: Weber Michaud
- 25 May 1957 - 14 June 1957: Carlet Auguste
- 14 June 1957 - 22 October 1957: Maurepas Alcindor
- 22 October 1957 - 4 November 1958: Fritz Thébaud
- 5 November 1958 - 19 December 1959: André Théard
- 19 December 1959 - 25 October 1960:Gérard Philippeaux
- 25 October 1960 - 9 December 1963: Hervé Boyer
- 9 December 1963 - 18 July 1964: Clovis Désinor
- 18 July 1964 - 26 November 1965: Hervé Boyer
- 26 November 1965 - 10 October 1970: Clovis Désinor
- 19 October 1970 - 22 April 1971: André Dubé
- 22 April 1971 - 9 August 1973: Edouard Francisque
- 9 August 1973 - 13 November 1979: Emmanuel Bros
- 13 November 1979 - 17 July 1980: Hervé Boyer
- 17 July 1980 - 3 February 1982: Emmanuel Bros
- 3 February 1982 - 12 July 1982: Marc Bazin
- 12 July 1982 - 30 December 1985: Frantz Merceron
- 30 December 1985 - 7 February 1986: Frantz Flambert
- 7 February 1986 - 18 April 1986: Marcel Léger
- 21 April 1986 - 7 February 1988: Leslie Delatour
- 12 February 1988 - 20 June 1988: Alain Turnier
- 20 June 1988 - 18 September 1988: André Jean-Pierre
- 18 September 1988 - 18 December 1989: Léonce Thélusma
- 18 December 1989 - 16 March 1990: Franck Paultre
- 16 March 1990 - 21 May 1990: Leslie Goutier
- 21 May 1990 - 24 August 1990: Violène Legagneur
- 24 August 1990 - 7 February 1991: Onil Millet
- 19 February 1991 - 30 September 1991: Marie-Michèle Rey
- 15 October 1991 - 19 June 1992: Charles A. Beaulieu
- 19 June 1992 - 1 September 1993: Wiener Fort
- 1 September 1993 - 7 November 1993: Marie-Michèle Rey
- 16 May 1994 - 24 August 1994: Rigaud Duplan
- 24 August 1994 - 8 November 1994: Georges Henry
- 8 November 1994 - 7 November 1995: Marie-Michèle Rey
- 7 November 1995 - 6 March 1996: Jean-Marie Chérestal
- 6 March 1996 - 2 March 2001: Fred Joseph
- 2 March 2001 - 29 February 2004: Faubert Gustave
- 17 March 2004 - 9 June 2006: Henry Bazin
- 9 June 2006 - 12 November 2009: Daniel Dorsainvil
- 12 November 2009 - 19 October 2011: Ronald Baudin
- 19 October 2011 - 8 May 2012: André Lemercier Georges
- 8 May 2012 - 9 April 2013: Marie Carmelle Jean-Marie
- 11 April 2013 - 2 April 2014: Wilson Laleau
- 2 April 2014 - 18 January 2015: Marie Carmelle Jean-Marie
- 18 January 2015 - 23 March 2016: Wilson Laleau
- 23 March 2016 - 13 March 2017: Yves RoMayn Bastien
- 13 March 2017 - 17 September 2018: Jude Alix Patrick Salomon
- 17 September 2018 - September 2019: Ronald Décembre
- September 2019 - March 2020: Joseph Jouthe
- 5 March 2020 - 12 June 2024: Michel Patrick Boisvert
- 12 June 2024 - present: Ketleen Florestal

== See also ==
- Ministry of Economy and Finance (Haiti)
