= List of ambassadors of Haiti to France =

== List of ambassadors ==
- 1848 : Beaubrun Ardouin (ministre résident)
- 15 January 1859 – 13 January 1867 : Ernest Roumain, ministre résident d'Haïti en France
- 15 January 1859 – 13 January 1867 : Charles Haentjens, chargé d'affaires
- 15 January 1859 – 13 January 1867 : Baron Auguste l'Instant de Pradines, chargé d'affaires
- 19 March 1870 – 19 May 1874 : Brismard Brice, general, Minister Plenipotentiary of Haïti to Paris, London and Madrid
- 1883 : Joseph Anténor Firmin
- 9 October 1889 – 24 March 1896 : Alfred Box
- 21 December 1902 – 2 December 1908 : Jean-Joseph Dalbémar (1839)
- 1914-1916 : Jean Price Mars
- 1921 : Dantès Louis Bellegarde
- december 1922 : Auguste Bonamy
- 1926-1930 : Alfred Auguste Nemours
- 1934 : Constantin Mayard (1882–1940)
- 1937 : Léon Laleau
- 1937-1941 : Léon Thébaud
- 1951 : Franck Lavaud
- 29 juin 1990: Serge Vieux
- 27 mars 1995: Marc A Trouillot
- 12 novembre 2002: Robert Saurel
- 6 June 2005: Lionel Etienne
- 6 Jully 2015: Vanessa Lamothe-Matignon
- 5 October 2020: Jean-Josué Pierre Dahomey
- 1 September 2025: Louino Volcy
