= Hérard Abraham =

Haitian military officer and politician (1940–2022)

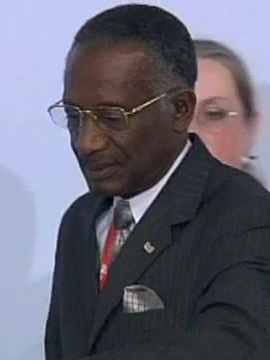
- Hérard Abraham in 2005

Minister of Foreign Affairs and Worship
- In office 28 January 2005 – 9 June 2006
- President: Boniface Alexandre
- Prime Minister: Gerard Latortue
- Preceded by: Yvon Simeon
- Succeeded by: Jean Rénald Clérismé

Minister of Interior and National Security
- In office 17 March 2004 – 28 January 2005
- President: Boniface Alexandre
- Prime Minister: Gerard Latortue
- Preceded by: Jocelerme Privert
- Succeeded by: Georges Moïse

Acting President of Haiti
- In office 10 March 1990 – 13 March 1990
- Preceded by: Prosper Avril
- Succeeded by: Ertha Pascal-Trouillot

Commander-in-chief of the Armed Forces of Haiti
- In office 10 March 1990 – 2 July 1991
- President: Ertha Pascal-Trouillot; Jean-Bertrand Aristide
- Preceded by: Prosper Avril
- Succeeded by: Raoul Cedras

Minister of Foreign Affairs and Worship
- In office 20 January 1988 – 18 September 1988
- President: Henri Namphy
- Preceded by: Gerard Latortue
- Succeeded by: Serge E. Charles

Minister of Information and Coordination
- In office 24 March 1986 – 5 January 1987
- President: Henri Namphy
- Preceded by: Max Vallès
- Succeeded by: Jacques Lorthé

Secretary of Interior and National Defence
- In office 7 February 1986 – 24 March 1986
- President: Henri Namphy

Personal details
- Born: 28 July 1940 Port-au-Prince, Haiti
- Died: 24 August 2022 (aged 82) Fermathe, Ouest, Haiti
- Spouse: Maryse Armand
- Occupation: Military officer, politician

Hérard Abraham (28 July 1940 – 24 August 2022) was a Haitian military officer and politician who served as acting President of Haiti between 10 March 1990 and 13 March 1990.

== Biography ==
Hérard Abraham was born in Port-au-Prince on 28 July 1940. He enlisted in the Haitian army as a young man and rose to the rank of lieutenant general. Abraham became one of the few military members in the inner circle of President Jean-Claude Duvalier. He supported the 1986 coup against him. Under Henri Namphy, he served as the Secretary of State for the Interior and National Defense from 7 February to 24 March 1986, the Minister of Information and Coordination from 24 March 1986 to January 1987 and Minister of Foreign Affairs from 20 June to 18 September 1988.

He became acting President of Haiti on 10 March 1990 after street protests forced President Prosper Avril into exile. He gave up power three days later, becoming the only military leader in Haiti during the twentieth century to give up power voluntarily. Abraham helped in securing the 1990–91 Haitian general election. In January 1991, he helped to crush a coup attempt by Roger Lafontant. In July 1991, he was forced to retire from the army by the recently elected President Jean-Bertrand Aristide and moved to the United States. He settled in Miami, Florida and drifted into obscurity.

After the 2004 Haitian coup d'état forced Aristide to resign, Abraham was one of the contenders for the position of the Prime Minister of Haiti. His friend Gérard Latortue however was chosen at the end by the Council of Sages and he appointed Abraham as a minister in his cabinet. Abraham was sworn in as the Minister of Interior and National Security on 17 March 2004. He later served as the Minister of Foreign Affairs from 28 January 2005 to 9 June 2006.

On 7 October 2019, amid nationwide protests for the resignation of Haitian President Jovenel Moise, the retired lieutenant general penned an open letter regretting the situation. He called on political leaders to show thoughtfulness and patience for a resolution so that the country could never again be called a "shit hole", referring to language attributed to U.S. President Donald Trump.

In 2020, President Jovenel Moïse appointed Abraham to a five-member committee for drafting a new Constitution of Haiti. He started suffering from a brain tumor before his death and died at the age of 82 on 24 August 2022 at his home in Fermathe.

Political offices
Preceded by Prosper Avril	President of Haïti; 1990	Succeeded by Ertha Pascal-Trouillot
