= Leslie Delatour =

Haitian economist, Finance Minister and Governor of the central bank

Leslie Delatour (1950–2001) was a Haitian public official and economist who shaped Haiti’s economic policies during the late 20th century. He was Haiti's Minister of Finance in 1986–1987 and later Governor of the Bank of the Republic of Haiti from 1994 to 1998. He also served as consultant at the World Bank, the Inter-American Development Bank, and USAID.

A neoliberal, Delatour advocated for fiscal discipline, economic liberalization, and structural reforms. He helped shape Haiti’s economic strategies in collaboration with organizations such as the International Monetary Fund (IMF) and the World Bank. His policies led to huge privatisations, destroyed the country's agriculture industry, and led to a large influx of rural poor to the nation's capital, Port-au-Prince. At the height of his career, Delatour was dubbed by Le Monde Diplomatique as "all-powerful".

== Early life ==
Delatour was born in 1950. He studied at Johns Hopkins University, and at the University of Chicago.

== Career ==
=== Ministerial advisor ===
His first notable job in Haiti was working in 1982 for Finance Minister Marc Bazin under the administration of Jean-Claude Duvalier. Bazin became favored in international circles for his anti-corruption drive but he was removed from his post after five months.

=== Interim Minister ===
After Jean-Claude Duvalier (Baby Doc) was ousted on 7 February 1986, Delatour was chosen to be Minister of Finance starting in April 1986 under the interim government of General Henri Namphy.

In the 1960s François Duvalier closed all Haiti's ports except that of Port-au-Prince; Delatour had them reopened and contraband poured into the country. He reduced tariffs on imported rice and reduced the budget of the government agricultural agency in the rice-producing Artibonite region of Haiti by 30%. He reasoned that Haitians were wasting their time with inefficient agriculture, that the law of comparative advantage dictated that Haiti move much of its rural population to the cities where they could serve as cheap labor for industrial assembly plants as part of the global supply chain.

He thus accelerated the neoliberalism introduced under Jean-Claude Duvalier, arguing that he was removing the means through which corrupt officials could steal development aid and sabotage profitable planning. He argued further that his reforms were reducing prices for food and other essentials.

Jean-Bertrand Aristide, later President of Haiti, dubbed Delatour's appointment the "death plan". In June 1986, five days of protests took place throughout Haiti, the protesters demanding Delatour's resignation. Henri Namphy said that this "almost [led] a civil war" and promised to hold elections as a result. In November 1986, a general strike followed, again with calls for Delatour's dismissal. Namphy believed the provisional government did not have a mandate for carrying out sweeping reforms; Delatour believed otherwise.

Haiti's sugar industry was hit hard by his policies as Haiti's sugar company Hasco was shut down in April 1987 days after the Cayes Sugar Factory announced it was closing; these two events cost over 40,000 jobs. Delatour had shut down both state-owned sugar mills: the Darbonne National Sugar Factory in the Léogâne area in the autumn of 1986 and also the Citadel Sugar Factory in Cap-Haïtien. As a result, contraband Dominican sugar flooded into the Haitian market destroying the Haitian sugar industry. Delatour argued the sugar companies were inefficient and used an unnecessarily large amount of government funds.

Delatour's decision to open the country up the country's market to subsidized American rice helped drive domestic producers out of business. Many moved to the capital, Port-au-Prince, which saw a rapid expansion of the shantytown, Cité Soleil. The industrial sector couldn't absorbed all the cheap labour so many were driven to work in the informal sector, most notably in the charcoal trade helping to de-forest Haiti's hills even further.

The new imports of U.S. subsidized rice were protected by military convoys to protect it from peasants who tried to stop its transportation. For this, the New York Times described him in 1987 as "reviled" in Haiti but celebrated by the U.S. government and by the International Monetary Fund and World Bank.

=== First Aristide government ===
Delatour left his post in February 1988 when the provisional military government ended. However, his presence as an advisor became a condition for international aid and loans. To appease these forces who distrusted him based on his left-wing reputation, Jean-Bertrand Aristide, who had previously denounced Delatour's "death plan", made him part of his team in 1991 after he won the Haitian presidency.

=== Return of Aristide government ===
In September 1991, Delatour openly condemned the coup d'état that deposed Aristide and brought Raoul Cédras and Michel François into power. His support for the deposed president was a very important factor in permitting Aristide to be restored to office in 1994.

Shortly before Aristide's restoration, Delatour and Leslie Voltaire had proposed a plan titled the "Strategy of Social and Economic Reconstruction", a set of neoliberal reforms that convinced the U.S. to restore Aristide to power. In Haiti, the reforms were dubbed "The American Plan".

In October 1994, after Aristide was restored to the presidency, Delatour refused to be involved in the government unless the neoliberal Smarck Michel, whose businesses included the rice importation that was damaging the Haitian peasantry became Premier. After Aristide capitulated to this demand, Delatour accepted the post of Governor of the Bank of the Republic of Haiti where he raised the interest rates consistent with his Chicago School ideological position.

=== Préval government ===
The reform program he started in the mid-1980s was deepened under President René Préval, elected in December 1995, with the rice tariff slashed to 3%. With his help, Haiti became the most open country to trade in the whole Caribbean area.

The country's cement factory and the flour mill were privatised in 1997 under Delatour's plan; both have since shut down, leaving Haiti with neither flour mill nor a cement production. Delatour resigned in 1998 midway through President René Préval's first term .

=== Legacy ===
In 2007, Haiti's state-owned asset, Teleco, underwent privatization for $59 million, resulting in the loss of 2,800 jobs.

Delatour's pro-globalization and anti-nationalism sentiments economic policies had a lasting if deterious impact. His reforms saw Haiti become one of the most privatized nations globally, they led to the decline of Haitian agriculture, and a rapid increase in the population of Port-au-Prince. Delatour's strategies led to a loss of self-sufficiency in rice production, leaving the country dependent on food imports and susceptible to fluctuations in global food prices. Under his policies, Haiti's per capita income plummeted to $329 in 2000, compared to $600 in 1980 during the height of Jean-Claude Duvalier's rule. His reforms also contributed to nostalgia for the Duvalier regimes. Another consequence of the changes was the government's inability to respond to the catastrophic 2010 earthquake, further exposing the vulnerabilities exacerbated by these policies.

== Death ==
Delatour died of cancer on 24 January 2001 in Miami, Florida, United States. He was 53. He was survived by his wife and 5 children. His wife re-married to Haiti's President René Préval. His brothers, Lionel Delatour and Patrick Delatour, occupy prominent roles in the Haitian economy.

== Bibliography ==
- Mark D Danner, "The Struggle for a Democratic Haiti", The New York Times, 21 June 1987
- Mark Danner, "Beyond the Mountains", Harper's,
- Lisa McGowan, "Democracy Undermined", Development Group for Alternative Policies, January 1997
- Todd Robberson, "Aristide Selects Business Leader for Prime Minister", Washington Post, 25 October 1994
- Allan Nairn, "Aristide Banks on Austerity", Multinational Monitor
- Adam Silvia, "The Day the Banks Stood Still: Haiti, The United States, and Monetary Policy in the 1980s", Florida State University
