= Léon Audain =

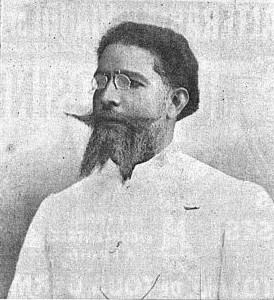
- Dr. Audain
- Born: December 17, 1862; Port-au-Prince, Haiti
- Died: August 22, 1930 (aged 67); Paris, France
- Occupations: Physician, bacteriologist, parasitologist, writer, educator
- Medical career
- Notable works: Fièvres Intertropicales, Diagnostic Hématologique et Clinique (Intertropical Fevers, Hematologic and Clinical Diagnostic)

Léon Audain (December 17, 1862 – September 22, 1930) was a Haitian physician and professor who focused his studies mainly towards bacteriology and parasitology. He published many works during his career, including Fièvres Intertropicales, Diagnostic Hématologique et Clinique (Intertropical Fevers, Hematologic and Clinical Diagnostic), a comprehensive study of intertropical fevers conducted in collaboration with several other fellow physicians in 1910.

== Education ==
Audain completed his secondary education at a Parisian high school, then continued his training at a medical college in Paris, where he earned his medical degree.

== Professional career ==
Audain wrote numerous articles and studies for medical forums and magazines in Paris before returning to Haiti in 1891. He gained notoriety in the country for beginning a modernizing revolution in Haitian medical practice, mainly for leading the publishing of a medical journal La Lanterne Medicale from 1899 to 1911. Audain was able to publish the first records of health conditions in Haiti, revolutionizing the future of Haitian medicine. Audain, with Paul-Félix Armand-Delille, Paul Solomon and other doctors and pharmacists established the Polyclinique Péan (named after famous French surgeon Jules-Émile Péan), one of the first free schools of medicine in Haiti. In 1902, he was appointed director of the National School of Medicine in Port-au-Prince, but would soon return to Paris in 1904 to devote his studies to bacteriology and parasitology under the direction of professor Raphaël Blanchard. He returned to Port-au-Prince after some time, and founded a laboratory of clinical bacteriology and parasitology there in 1905. He was appointed as the ambassador of Haiti to Germany in 1914, but had to vacate his position during the first days of World War I. He was appointed the secretary of Public Instruction of Haiti in 1916, replacing Louis Borno.

== Personal life ==
Audain was born in Port-au-Prince on December 17, 1863, and was the only child of Louis Audain and Caroline Marguerite Duthiers. He had 3 children named Georges, Suzanne Christiane Leone and Raoul with his wife, Hélène Balistan. His father, Louis Audain, was a doctor, and had various educational and governmental positions, including the director of the school of medicine in Haiti in 1869, member of the Haitian Legislative Council from 1869 to 1871, and Senator from 1872 to 1876, eventually becoming the Senate president in 1876. He had 3 children: Georges, Raoul and Christiane.

== Rabies scare ==
On April 17, 1916, Audain and his wife deboarded Prins Der Nederlanden in New York City from Port-au-Prince, heading to the Pasteur Foundation to seek treatment for a potential rabies infection they may have received from a bite from a pet dog 10 days earlier. Also aboard the ship were the bodies of American marine sergeants William G. Kennedy and Seth A. Poinchot; both had died from black fever in Haiti, and were shipped to the United States for a proper burial.

== Prix Léon Audain ==
In 1996, Ary Bordes founded the Prix Léon Audain, a prestigious award commemorating efforts of doctors and institutions in Haiti to improve the health of Haitian citizens.

== Bibliography ==
Audain authored and co-authored 8 books during his lifetime, all of which were written in French.

1. De la luxation sous-glénoidienne (Subglenoidal dislocation) - 1889
2. De l'Hémostase préventive dans les opérations chirurgicales. Etude théorique et pratique du pincement préventif des vaisseaux combiné au morcellement suivant la méthode de M. Périn (Dislocation under preventive homeostasis in surgical operations. Theoretical and practical study of the preventive pinching of vessels combined with fragmentation according to M. Perin's method) - 1891
3. Pathologie intertropicale (doctrines et clinique), par le Dr. Léon Audain (Intertropical Pathology (doctrines and clinic), by Dr. Léon Audain) - 1904
4. Le mal d'Haïti, sescauses et son traitement (The evil of Haiti, its cures and its treatment) - 1908
5. Étude sociale: le mal d'Haiti, ses causes et son traitement (Social study: the evil of Haiti, its causes and its treatment) - 1908
6. Fièvres Intertropicales, Diagnostic Hématologique et Clinique (Intertropical Fevers, Hematologic and Clinical Diagnostic) - 1910
7. Choses d'Haïti (Things to Haiti) - 1916
8. Les bases rationelles de la médication leucogène dans les infections médicales & chirurgicales (The Rational Basis of Leukogenic Medication in Medical & Surgical Infections) - 1916

== Gallery ==
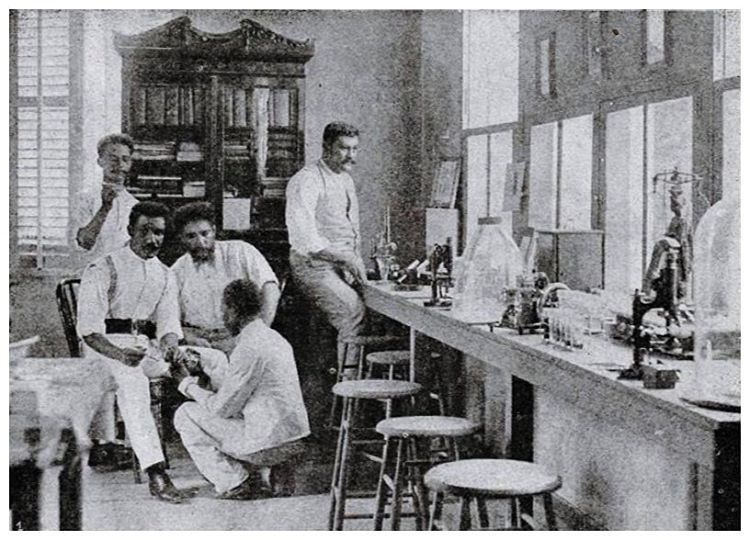
A team of parasitologists working in the parasitology laboratory of Dr. Léon Audain.
