= List of ambassadors of Haiti to the United States =

Ambassador of Haiti to the United States
- Inaugural holder: Philippe Hannibal Price
- Formation: January 1, 1890

The ambassador of Haiti to the United States is the chief diplomatic representative of the government of the Republic of Haiti to the government of the United States. The ambassador's office is located at the Embassy of Haiti in Washington, D.C.

== List of representatives ==
Diplomatic agrément	Diplomatic accreditation	Ambassador	Observations	List of heads of state of Haiti	List of presidents of the United States	Term end
	March 3, 1863	Ernest Roumain	(*1836) Colonel Aide-de-camp of Fabre Geffrard.: ~January 15, 1859-January 13, 1867: Ministre résident Ambassade d'Haïti en France.; September 1, 1878 - November 14, 1878: Haitian foreign minister.; July 17, 1878 - November 14, 1878: Liste des ministres haïtiens des Finances.	Fabre Geffrard	Abraham Lincoln	April 21, 1867
	April 21, 1867	Demosthenes Bruno	Chargé d'affaires	Nissage Saget	Ulysses S. Grant	June 28, 1867
	June 28, 1867	George F. Usher	Chargé d'affaires (1792-1877)	Nissage Saget	Ulysses S. Grant	October 17, 1867 October 17, 1867. Took leave March 22, 1869
	October 17, 1867	George Racster	Chargé d'affaires	Nissage Saget	Ulysses S. Grant	March 22, 1869
	March 29, 1869	Evariste Laroche	Chargé d'affaires	Nissage Saget	Ulysses S. Grant	April 21, 1867
	November 20, 1869	Alexander Tate	envoy extraordinary and Minister Plenipotentiary	Nissage Saget	Ulysses S. Grant	February 11, 1870
	April 22, 1870	Stephen Preston	Haitian Minister at Washington continuously for nearly twenty years, and during a third of that time, he was the dean of the diplomatic corps there. In 1885 was sent on a special mission to Europe. grandson of a British officer, who had settled in Haiti after the Blockade of Saint-Domingue.	Fabre Geffrard	Ulysses S. Grant	
	1884	Ebenezer Bassett	Chargé d'affaires of the Haitian delegation in Washington, D. C. during the absence of Stephen Preston	Fabre Geffrard	Ulysses S. Grant	1885
January 1, 1890		Philippe Hannibal Price		François Denys Légitime	Benjamin Harrison	
March 1, 1893		Clément Haentjens		François Denys Légitime	Grover Cleveland	
October 14, 1896		Jacques Nicolas Léger		Henri Namphy	Ronald Reagan	
March 2, 1909		H. Paulens Sannon		François C. Antoine Simon	William Howard Taft	
November 21, 1911		Solon Ménos		Michel Martelly	William Howard Taft	
July 30, 1913		Ulrick Divivier	Ulrick (Père) Duvivier n. 30 Jan 1867 Cap-Haitien d. 16 juil 1932 Port-au-Prince	Michel Oreste	Woodrow Wilson	
July 21, 1914		Solon Ménos	(DIED 14. Oktober 1918)	Oreste Zamor	Woodrow Wilson	October 14, 1918
October 14, 1918		ht:Albert Blanchet	Chargé d'affaires from 1932 to 1933: Haitian foreign minister.	Philippe Sudré Dartiguenave	Woodrow Wilson	
March 27, 1919	August 6, 1919	Charles Moravia		Philippe Sudré Dartiguenave	Woodrow Wilson	
July 1, 1920		ht:Albert Blanchet	Chargé d'affaires	Philippe Sudré Dartiguenave	Woodrow Wilson	
February 25, 1921		ht:Albert Blanchet		Philippe Sudré Dartiguenave	Warren G. Harding	
March 2, 1923		León Dejean	1922: Haitian foreign minister.	Louis Bornó	Calvin Coolidge	
February 10, 1925		Hannibal Price		Louis Bornó	Calvin Coolidge	
May 26, 1928		Raoul Lizaire	Chargé d'affaires	Louis Bornó	Calvin Coolidge	
July 14, 1930		Ulrick Divivier		Louis Eugène Roy	Herbert C. Hoover	
February 16, 1931		Dantès Bellegarde		Sténio Vincent	Herbert C. Hoover	
December 9, 1933		ht:Albert Blanchet		Sténio Vincent	Franklin D. Roosevelt	
April 14, 1937		Élie Lescot		Sténio Vincent	Franklin D. Roosevelt	
January 23, 1941		Jacques Carmeleau-Antoine	Chargé d'affaires	Élie Lescot	Franklin D. Roosevelt	
July 1, 1941	July 14, 1941	Fernand Dennis		Élie Lescot	Franklin D. Roosevelt	
November 17, 1942	November 25, 1942	André Liautaud	(born October 1, 1906 in Port-au-Prince	Élie Lescot	Franklin D. Roosevelt	
May 4, 1943		LEGATION RAISED TO EMBASSY		Élie Lescot	Franklin D. Roosevelt	
April 19, 1943	May 4, 1943	André Liautaud		Élie Lescot	Franklin D. Roosevelt	
October 4, 1945	October 17, 1945	Jacques Carmeleau-Antoine		Élie Lescot	Harry S. Truman	
January 11, 1946			relation suspended	Franck Lavaud	Harry S. Truman	April 8, 1946
May 28, 1946	June 3, 1946	Dantès Bellegarde		Franck Lavaud	Harry S. Truman	
September 24, 1946	October 8, 1946	Joseph D. Charles		Franck Lavaud	Harry S. Truman	
July 26, 1950	August 7, 1950	Gustave Laraque	(1900–1968)	Franck Lavaud	Harry S. Truman	
April 7, 1952	April 22, 1952	Jacques Léger	1950–1952: Haitian foreign minister.	Paul Eugène Magloire	Harry S. Truman	
January 13, 1956	January 19, 1956	Mauclair Zéphirin	(born 1916 née Capucine Leconte May 30, 2009 in Boca Raton)	Paul Eugène Magloire	Dwight D. Eisenhower	
January 31, 1957	March 11, 1957	Dantès Bellegarde		Antonio Thrasybule Kebreau	Dwight D. Eisenhower	
January 17, 1958	February 10, 1958	Luc Fouché	Magloire's secretary	François Duvalier	Dwight D. Eisenhower	
November 13, 1958	December 8, 1958	Ernest Bonhomme	Assistant Secretary of National Economy	François Duvalier	Dwight D. Eisenhower	
October 24, 1961	October 26, 1961	Louis Mars	eldest son of Jean Price-Mars	François Duvalier	John F. Kennedy	
March 24, 1964	April 8, 1964	André Theard		François Duvalier	Lyndon B. Johnson	
January 9, 1967	January 13, 1967	Arthur Bonhomme	June 1992) 17 June 1958 – 4 November 1958:fr:Liste des ministres haïtiens des Travaux publics, Haitian ambassador Arthur Bonhomme filed the complaint in a three-page letter to Secretary of State Dean Rusk after he attended a private screening of the film written by British author Graham Greene. The movie is based on a Greene novel The Comedians (1967 film)	François Duvalier	Lyndon B. Johnson	
May 24, 1971	July 22, 1971	René Chalmers	1961–1971: Haitian foreign minister.	Jean-Claude Duvalier	Richard Nixon	
August 13, 1973		Josette Philippeau	Chargé d'affaires	Jean-Claude Duvalier	Richard Nixon	
March 1, 1974	March 13, 1974	Gerard Salomon Bouchette		Jean-Claude Duvalier	Gerald Ford	
March 31, 1975	April 29, 1975	Georges Salomon	1985–1986: Haitian foreign minister.	Jean-Claude Duvalier	Gerald Ford	
November 14, 1979		Josette Philippeau	Chargé d'affaires	Jean-Claude Duvalier	Jimmy Carter	
March 14, 1980	April 24, 1980	Serge Élie Charles	1988–1989: Haitian foreign minister. Joining Cedras was his brother, a voudoun priest, press spokesman Serge Beaulieu, Colonel Dorelien from the general staff, and a former military officer named Serge Elie Charles, who was acting as Cedras's advisor.	Jean-Claude Duvalier	Jimmy Carter	
February 17, 1981		Josette Philippeaux	Chargé d'affaires	Jean-Claude Duvalier	Ronald Reagan	
May 13, 1981	June 12, 1981	Georges Nicolas Léger, Jr		Jean-Claude Duvalier	Ronald Reagan	
February 15, 1983	March 17, 1983	Fritz Nerval Cinéas		Jean-Claude Duvalier	Ronald Reagan	
September 27, 1984	December 10, 1984	Adrien Raymond	1961–1971: Haitian foreign minister.	Jean-Claude Duvalier	Ronald Reagan	
April 14, 1986	June 23, 1986	Pierre Desforges Sam		Henri Namphy	Ronald Reagan	
December 13, 1988	February 7, 1989	Pierre François Benoit		Leslie Manigat	Ronald Reagan	
September 4, 1991	October 1, 1991	Jean Casimir	Operation Uphold Democracy	Jean-Bertrand Aristide	George H. W. Bush	
August 2, 2005	October 3, 2005	Raymond Joseph		Boniface Alexandre	George W. Bush	
September 14, 2010	September 16, 2010	Louis Harold Joseph		René Préval	Barack Obama	
April 17, 2012	May 2, 2012	Paul Getty Altidor		Michel Martelly	Barack Obama	February 12, 2019
February 22, 2019	February 22, 2019	Hervé Denis		Jovenel Moïse	Donald Trump	December 1, 2020
December 1, 2020		Bocchit Edmond		Jovenel Moïse	Donald Trump; Joe Biden	January 20, 2025
