= Claudette Werleigh =

Haitian politician (born 1946)

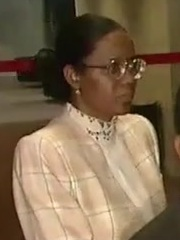
- Claudette Werleigh in 1993

7th Prime Minister of Haiti
- In office 7 November 1995 – 6 March 1996
- President: Jean-Bertrand Aristide; René Préval
- Preceded by: Smarck Michel
- Succeeded by: Rosny Smarth

Minister of Foreign Affairs and Religions
- In office 8 November 1994 – 7 November 1995
- Prime Minister: Smarck Michel
- Preceded by: Charles Anthony David
- Succeeded by: Fritz Longchamp
- In office 1 September 1993 – 16 May 1994
- Prime Minister: Robert Malval
- Preceded by: François Benoit
- Succeeded by: Charles Anthony David

Minister of Social Affairs
- In office 16 March 1990 – 24 August 1990
- President: Ertha Pascal-Trouillot (Acting)
- Preceded by: Camille Sylaire
- Succeeded by: Carlo Désinor

Personal details
- Born: Claudette Antoine; 26 September 1946 (age 80) Cap-Haïtien, Haiti
- Party: Lavalas Political Organisation
- Spouse: Georges Werleigh
- Education: State University of Haiti

Claudette Werleigh (born 26 September 1946) is a Haitian politician who served as the prime minister of Haiti from 1995 to 1996. She was Haiti's first female prime minister.

In 1999 Werleigh became director at the Life & Peace Institute in Uppsala, Sweden, and then in 2007 secretary general and in 2010 peace envoy of the Catholic peace organization Pax Christi International in Brussels, Belgium.

== Background ==
Claudette was born in 1946, in Cap-Haïtien in a well-to-do family. Her parents exported coffee and in addition her mother had a shop. Her father was a former MP, but withdrew from politics before Claudette was born. Claudette attended Catholic institutions for her primary and secondary schooling, studied diverse subjects, including medicine and pedagogy, in Spain, the US, Mexico, and Haiti and she obtained an undergraduate degree in law and economics at Université d'État d'Haïti in Port-au-Prince. In 1978 she was registered as a lawyer.

== Career ==
In 1968-70 Werleigh worked as a medical technician and chemist in the US, in 1971-73 as a physiologist in Switzerland and in 1973-74 as an adult educator in Haiti. In 1970, she married George Werleigh, a professor of economics and a prominent figure in the social-democratic party PANPRA (the National Progressive Revolutional Haitian Party). The couple had two daughters.

Werleigh engaged in social and educational work in a number of non governmental organizations in the fields of adult literacy and humanitarian relief. In 1975 she joined Catholic Emergency Aid for Haiti and was from 1976 to 1987 Secretary General in Haiti National Caritas, travelling all around the country. From 1983 to 1987 she was Caribbean Coordinator for Caritas International. In 1979, Werleigh founded ITECA (Institute of Technology and Animation) one of Haiti's most important educational organizations.

She helped found the League for women's empowerment ("Lig Pouvwa Fanm"), an organization of women seeking political and economic equality and promoting women's participation in politics. It was important to bridge the gulf separating different worlds, the poor and the affluent, women and power structures. Women were the backbone of society and had a great capacity for peace-making.

== Political positions ==
From 1990 onwards Werleigh became active in public administration and politics in Haiti. From March to August 1990 she was Minister of Social Affairs as an independent in President Ertha Pascal-Trouillot's interim government. When Aristide became president, Werleigh joined Prime Minister Rene Preval's private cabinet in 1991 and was engaged in the Lavalas movement in support of the president. From July 1992 to October 1993, she was the executive director of the Washington office on Haiti, doing advocacy and lobbying. In 1993–1995 she was Minister of Foreign Affairs and Religions in the Malval and Michel governments. During her appointment as Minister of Foreign Affairs, she was in exile following the Aristide government. She then served as prime minister for a hundred days in 1995–1996. Her task was to strengthen the leadership of the country and organize democratic presidential elections. Her election as prime minister inspired women, especially to work and run for political office.

Claudette Werleigh appointed a cabinet with 17 ministers, including 4 women, and declared that her aim was political, social, cultural and economic justice. She received financial support for energy, agriculture and road construction and improved relations with Cuba and Taiwan. She also tried to reduce Haiti's economic dependence and halted the privatization process. But then IMF held back loans, sparking a political crisis. Rene Preval was elected president with 88 per cent of the vote. It was the first peaceful change of president since Haiti became independent. Preval was an ally of Aristide and would have liked Claudette Werleigh to continue as prime minister. But the majority in parliament, which needed to approve the prime minister, had changed, so Werleigh withdrew and left the country.

== Peaceworker ==
In 1999 she became the conflict transformation programme's director of the Life and Peace Institute in Uppsala, Sweden. Claudette's work took her to conflict areas all over Latin America and several other countries in Asia, Africa, and to most countries in Western Europe. Some countries she worked in included the Democratic Republic of Congo. In 2007 she was elected Secretary General of Pax Christi International, a non governmental Catholic peace movement working on a global scale on a wide variety of issues in the fields of human rights, security and disbarment, economic justice and ecology. She also worked for the empowerment of women in post-conflict countries. Prior to this she was vice president and a member of the executive committee of Pax International, from 1992 to 2001. In 2010 she became a Peace Envoy in Pax Christi International.

Political offices
Preceded by Smarck Michel	Prime Minister of Haiti; 1995–1996	Succeeded by Rosny Smarth
