= Hervé Denis =

Haitian diplomat

Ambassador Hervé Denis discusses Haiti and its diaspora, speaking in Haitian Creole

Hervé Denis is a government official in Haiti. He held various posts including Minister of Defense and various ambassadorships including ambassador from Haiti to the United States. He succeeded Paul Altidor as Haiti's ambassador to the United States. He was succeeded as ambassador to the U.S. by Bocchit Edmond.

He described Haiti's Provisional Electoral Council as unconstitutional. In discussing United States threats against opponents of the Council, he called the United States the "King of the World".

== See also ==
- List of ambassadors of Haiti to the United States
