= Fernand Hibbert =

Haitian novelist

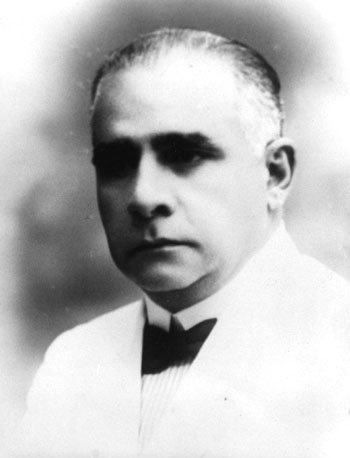
- Fernand Hibbert
- Born: Miragoâne, Haiti; October 3, 1873
- Died: 1928 (aged 54–55); Port-au-Prince, Haiti
- Children: 4, including Lucien Hibbert

Fernand Hibbert (3 October 1873 – 1928) was a Haitian novelist and is one of the most widely read Haitian authors. He is known for his satiric and humorous novels.

== Life ==
Born in Miragoâne, Hibbert was educated in Paris, France, where he studied law and political science. After returning to Haiti in 1894, he worked as a teacher, politician, and diplomat. He was a member of the Liberal Party. He taught at Lycee Pétion from 1904. He worked as the Haitian minister plenipotentiary in Havana from 1916 to 1920.

=== Writing ===
Hibbert's writing career began with history essays and with journalism. He co-founded the newspaper Le Soir with Justin Lhérisson, and published works there between 1899 and 1908.

Along with his contemporaries Frédéric Marcelin and Justin Lhérisson, he is recognised for writing novels representative of the Haitian tradition.

His 1908 novella Romulus was translated into English in 2013.

=== Personal life ===
Hibbert married Marie Pescaye, a French woman he had met in Paris, in 1895. The couple had four children, including Haitian mathematician and statesman Lucien Hibbert.

He died in Port-au-Prince in 1928.

== Selected works ==
- Séna (1905)
- Les Thazar (1907)
- Romulus (1908)
- Masques et Visages (1910)
- Manuscrit de mon Ami (1923)
- Simulacres (1923)
- Romulus. Translated into English. Aylmer, QC: Deux Voiliers, 2013. ISBN 978-0988104891
- Pretenders. Les Simulacres translated into English. Aylmer, QC: Deux Voiliers, 2018. ISBN 978-1928049500
