= Marie Carmelle Jean-Marie =

Haitian politician

Marie Carmelle Jean-Marie is a Haitian politician who was the Minister of Finance and Economy. Previously, Jean-Marie held the position from the summer of 2012 until she resigned in April 2013. She returned to the position in April 2014 when 10 new government ministers were appointed in a major overhaul of the government. She left office again in January 2015 when Haitian President Michel Martelly made changes to the government by appointing a new Prime Minister of Haiti and different government Ministers and cabinet members.
