= Alain Turnier =

Alain Turnier (died 1991) was a Haitian historian. He is the author of several best-selling books:

- Les Etats-Unis et le Marché Haïtien
- Avec Mérisier Jeannis
- Quand la Nation Demande des Comptes

He was Minister of Finance briefly in 1956 and in 1988.
