= Edner Brutus =

Haitian politician, diplomat, and historian

Francisco Carnival (Edner Brutus) (20 April 1911 – 6 November 1980) was a Haitian politician, diplomat, and historian. He served as Foreign Minister of Haiti from 1974 to 1978, and as a historian he is best known for his book Révolution dans Saint-Domingue (1969). His father, Timoléon C. Brutus, was also a prominent politician and historian.

== See also ==
- Liévano–Brutus treaty
