= Jean-Robert Estimé =

Haitian politician (1941–2025)

Jean-Robert Estimé (17 October 1941 – 23 May 2025) was a Haitian politician. He was Foreign Minister of Haiti from February 1982 to December 1985. Estimé was born on 17 October 1941, and died on 23 May 2025, at the age of 83.
