= André Liautaud =

Haitian diplomat and politician (1906–1951)

Haitian Ambassador to the United States
- In office July 14, 1941 – October 17, 1945
- Preceded by: Fernand Dennis
- Succeeded by: Jacques Carmeleau Antoine

Haitian Minister of Public Health
- In office October 30, 1945 – January 11, 1946
- Succeeded by: Benoit Alexandre

Personal details
- Born: October 1, 1906 Port-au-Prince
- Died: July 26, 1951 (aged 45) Port-au-Prince
- Spouse: Yvonee Prezeau
- Parents: Emmanuel A. Dreyfus (father); Eugenie Liautaud (mother)
- Education: 1924:Graduated Institute Saint Louis de Gonzague; 1925:Ecole Centrale d'Agriculture.; 1930:Bachelor of Science, Teachers College, Columbia University.

André Liautaud (October 1, 1906 – July 26, 1951) was a Haitian diplomat and politician.

- From 1925 to 1928, he was director of a farm school.
- From 1928 to 1938, he was assistant director of rural education.
- From 1938 to 1941, he was commissioner general for a land settlement project.
- From 1941 to 1942, he was director of rural education.
- In 1942, he was under-secretary of finance, commerce and industry.
- On July 1, 1941 he was appointed minister plenipotentiary to Washington, D.C., where he was accredited on November 25, 1942.
- On May 4, 1943 the legation was upgraded to embassy.
- On April 19, 1943 he was designated ambassador and accredited on May 4, 1943.
- From February to March 1945 he was delegate to the Pan-American Conference on the Problems of War and Peace, in Chapultepec.
- From April 25, 1945, to June 26, 1945, he participated on the United Nations Conference on International Organization in San Francisco.
- From October 30, 1945, to January 11, 1946, he was Haitian Minister of Public Health in Port-au-Prince.
