= Pierre Desforges Sam =

Haitian diplomat (1925–2019)

Haitian Ambassador to the United States from Haiti to United States
- In office June 23, 1986 – February 7, 1989
- President: Henri Namphy
- Preceded by: Adrien Raymond
- Succeeded by: Pierre François Benoit

Haitian Minister of Agriculture
- In office April 30, 1982 – July 12, 1982
- Preceded by: René Destin
- Succeeded by: Rémillot Léveillé

Personal details
- Born: March 23, 1925 Saint-Louis-du-Nord, Haiti
- Died: May 16, 2019 (aged 94) Pétion-Ville, Haiti
- Parents: Felix Desforges Sam (father); Exantucia Poux (mother)
- Education: 1945: Bachelor of Science in Agricultural Engineering, University Haiti,. 1946 1946: Bachelor of Scientific Agriculture, University Mayaguez, Puerto Rico,.; 1951: Certification, University New Mexico,.; 1957: he was Student, Instituto Interamericano de Cooperación Agropecuaria, Costa Rica,.

Pierre Desforges Sam (23 March 1925 – 16 May 2019) was a Haitian diplomat.

== Life and career ==
Desforges Sam was born in Saint-Louis-du-Nord on 23 March 1925.

- From 1945 to 1953, he was Project manager of the United States Operations Mission, Gonâve, Saint-Raphaël, Haiti.
- From 1953 to 1955, he was National supervisor United States Operations Mission Extension, Port-au-Prince.
- From 1955 to 1962, he was Project manager of the Service Coopératif Interaméricain de Production Agricole in Haiti.
- From 1962 to 1963, he was Regional officer United Nations, Rome.
- From 1963 to 1980, he was Extension officer Governor of Haiti, Africa, South American, Africa.
- From 1981 to 1982, he was Minister of Planning Governor of Haiti, Port-au-Prince.
- From April 30, 1982 to July 12, 1982, he was Minister of Agriculture.
- From June 23, 1986 to February 7, 1989, he was Haitian Ambassador in Washington, D.C.
- He was a senior consultant, private consultant, manager employed from the United States Agency for International Development/Society d'Etudes et de Mise en Valeur, Haiti.

He died in Pétion-Ville on 16 May 2019, at the age of 94.
