= Philippe Hannibal Price =

Haitian diplomat and author (1841–1893)

Haitian Ambassador to the United States from Haiti to United States
- In office January 1, 1890 – January 1, 1893
- President: Florvil Hyppolite
- Succeeded by: Clément Haentjens

Personal details
- Born: January 1, 1841 Jacmel, Haiti
- Died: January 1, 1893 (aged 52) Baltimore, Maryland
- Spouse: Josephine Curet
- Children: Hannibal Price
- Education: received his education in his hometown.

Philippe Hannibal Price was a Haitian diplomat and author.

After the fall of President Michel Domingue, Price became a Counselor to the Provisional Government of 1875 and was a serious advocate of Florvil Hyppolite.

From 1890 to 1893 he served as Minister Plenipotentiary to Washington, D.C. It was during this time that he wrote his most famous book, De la Réhabilitation de la Race Noire par la République d'Haïti (English: On the Rehabilitation of the Black Race by the Republic of Haiti), published in 1893. Price died in Baltimore, Maryland of typhoid fever at the age of fifty-two.

== Selected works ==
- Etudes sur Les Finances et L'Économie des Nations
- Rapport sur Les Traveaux de la Première Conférence Pan-Américaine
- De La Réhabilitation de La Race noire et de La Republique D'Haïti (published 1893)
