= Rosny Smarth =

Haitian politician (1940–2025)

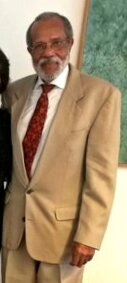
- Smarth in 2016

8th Prime Minister of Haiti
- In office 27 February 1996 – 9 June 1997
- President: René Préval
- Preceded by: Claudette Werleigh
- Succeeded by: Jacques-Édouard Alexis (in 1999)

Personal details
- Born: 19 October 1940 Cavaillon, Haiti
- Died: 15 January 2025 (aged 84)
- Party: OPL

Rosny Smarth (19 October 1940 – 15 January 2025) was a Haitian politician. He was Prime Minister of Haiti briefly, from 27 February 1996 to 9 June 1997. Smarth resigned before a successor was found, leaving the post vacant for nearly two years. His political party was the OPL.

In the early 1970s, Smarth was a member of Salvador Allende's administration in Chile, advising on land reform initiatives.

His brother William wrote Histoire de l'Église catholique d'Haïti, 1492-2003 (History of the Catholic Church of Haiti, 1492-2003). His great-nephew Milo Matthieu is a visual artist. His great-nephew Stevie Ruiz is a two-time Jeopardy champion.

Smarth died on 15 January 2025, aged 84.

Political offices
Preceded by Claudette Werleigh	Prime Minister of Haïti; 1996–1997	Vacant Title next held by Jacques-Édouard Alexis
