= Timoléon C. Brutus =

Haitian politician and historian (1886–1971)

Timoléon C. Brutus (March 23, 1886 – July 12, 1971) was a Haitian politician and historian. He was Foreign Minister of Haiti from 1946 to 1949. As a historian, Brutus wrote books about the leaders of the Haitian Revolution, Toussaint L'Ouverture and Jean-Jacques Dessalines. His most well-known works are Ranςon du Génie ou la Leςon de Toussaint Louverture (1945) and L'homme d'Airain (1946). One of his sons, Edner Brutus, also became a prominent politician and historian. His youngest son, Jean-Claude Brutus became a psychiatrist.
