= Paul Altidor =

American diplomat

Paul Getty Altidor is the former ambassador from Haiti to the United States. He served from 2012 until 2019. He was succeeded by Hervé Denis. He subsequently worked as a lecturer at Massachusetts Institute of Technology (MIT).

Altidor graduated from Boston College and MIT. He was Vice-President of the Clinton Bush Haiti Fund and worked in Washington D. C. at the International Finance Corporation, a private sector affiliate of the World Bank Group.

He attended Barack Obama's inauguration as U.S. president in January 2013. He appeared on PBS responding to comments made by U.S. President Donald Trump about Haitian immigrants. He said his father had worked as a taxi driver in Boston.

== See also ==
- List of ambassadors of Haiti to the United States
