= Marie-Denise Fabien Jean-Louis =

Haitian physician and politician (born 1944)

Minister of Foreign Affairs
- In office 19 February 1991 – 19 September 1991
- Prime Minister: René Préval
- Preceded by: Paul C. Latortue
- Succeeded by: Jean-Robert Sabalat

Personal details
- Born: 14 February 1944 (age 82) Gonaïves, Haiti
- Education: Louis Pasteur University (M.D.)

Marie-Denise Fabien Jean-Louis (born 14 February 1944) is a Haitian physician and government official who served as Minister of Foreign Affairs for several months in 1991, becoming the first woman to hold the position. Due to her ties to the Duvalier regime and her complete lack of diplomatic experience, her appointment was strongly opposed by many in the ruling party.

== Biography ==
Marie-Denise Fabien Jean-Louis was born on 14 February 1944 in the city of Gonaïves in northern Haiti. She attended the Louis Pasteur University in Strasbourg, France, from 1962 until 1973, receiving a Doctor of Medicine degree in anesthesiology.

On 19 February 1991, following the 1990–91 Haitian general election, Jean-Louis was appointed Minister of Foreign Affairs by Prime Minister René Préval, becoming the first woman to hold the position. Due to her complete lack of diplomatic experience and her ties to the Duvalier regime, her appointment was strongly opposed by President Jean-Bertrand Aristide's Lavalas movement.

As Haiti's international representative, she participated in the 1991 meeting of the Organization of American States and gave a speech to the United Nations Commission on Human Rights. During her tenure, Jean-Louis engaged in a diplomatic dispute with the Dominican Republic following the deportation of over 100 Haitians from the country. She also met with officials from The Bahamas, namely her counterpart Clement T. Maynard, regarding the influx of Haitian migrants into that country.

On 19 September 1991, President Aristide dismissed both Jean-Louis and Health Minister Daniel Henrys from their positions due to pressure from the Lavalas. She was replaced as minister by Jean-Robert Sabalat, the former head of the Provisional Electoral Council. Ten days later, elements in the Haitian military launched a successful coup, overthrowing Aristide's government. Following the coup, Jean-Louis went into hiding and her home was searched by soldiers.

In 1992, Jean-Louis was a member of the Executive Committee of the Pan American Health Organization.
