= Marjorie Michel =

Canadian politician

The Honourable Marjorie Michel PC MP

Minister of Health
- Incumbent
- Assumed office May 13, 2025
- Prime Minister: Mark Carney
- Preceded by: Kamal Khera

Member of Parliament for Papineau
- Incumbent
- Assumed office April 28, 2025
- Preceded by: Justin Trudeau

Personal details
- Born: Haiti
- Party: Liberal
- Parent: Smarck Michel (father)
- Education: University of Louvain

Marjorie Michel PC MP (French pronunciation: [maʁʒɔʁi miʃɛl]) is a Haitian-Canadian politician who has served as Minister of Health since 2025 in Prime Minister Mark Carney's cabinet. A member of the Liberal Party, she has been the member of Parliament (MP) for Papineau since 2025, succeeding former Prime Minister Justin Trudeau.

== Political career ==
She has a background in social and organizational psychology. She holds a master's degree in Social and Organizational Psychology from the University of Louvain in Belgium. Michel is a former student of the Sainte Rose de Lima Institution in Haiti. Michel has been active in politics since the early 2000s.

She was Director of Parliamentary Affairs for Employment and Social Development Canada and former political attaché to Canadian MP Emmanuel Dubourg, whom she later married. She was General Coordinator of the Annual General Assembly of the Organization of American States (OAS) in 1995, a position for which she received a distinction from the government of the United States of America. In 2009, she was appointed the head of the Ministry on the Status and Rights of Women (MCFDF).

Michel served as Chief of Staff to the Minister of Families, Children and Social Development and President of the Treasury Board in the Liberal government. During the 2019 and 2021 campaigns, she served as the Director of Campaign Operations in Quebec for the Liberal Party. She also served as the Quebec campaign co-chair in the 2021 Canadian federal election.

Michel became Deputy Chief of Staff in the office of Justin Trudeau in 2021 becoming the first black person to hold the position. In October 2024, she was appointed the new deputy national campaign director. She left the role weeks later.

She was named the Liberal Party candidate for Papineau and was elected in the 2025 Canadian federal election to replace Justin Trudeau.

== Personal life ==
Michel is of Haitian descent. She is the daughter of Victoire Marie-Rose Sterlin and former Prime Minister of Haiti Smarck Michel, and was married to former Bourassa MP Emmanuel Dubourg.

== Electoral record ==
2025 Canadian federal election: Papineau
Party	Candidate	Votes	%	±%	Expenditures
Liberal	Marjorie Michel	24,700	52.98	+2.68	$95,299.47
Bloc Québécois	Sophy Forget Bélec	7,726	16.57	+1.53	$3,281.71
New Democratic	Niall Ricardo	7,606	16.32	−6.36	$54,828.20
Conservative	Julio Rivera	4,927	10.57	+5.73	$2,430.15
Rhinoceros	Xavier Watso	676	1.45	+0.53	$0.00
People's	Noah Cherney	455	0.98	−1.36	$18.03
Communist	Stéphane Doucet	321	0.69	N/A	$0.00
Marxist–Leninist	Garnet Colly	208	0.45	+0.20	$0.00
Total valid votes/expense limit		46,619	98.65	–	$124,086.87
Total rejected ballots		640	1.35		
Turnout		47,259	65.77		
Eligible voters		71,853			
Liberal hold		Swing		+0.58	
Source: Elections Canada
Note: number of eligible voters does not include voting day registrations.

Order of precedence
Preceded by Jill McKnight as Member of the Cabinet	Order of Precedence of Canada as Member of the Cabinet	Succeeded by Eleanor Olszewski as Member of the Cabinet
