= Horace Pauleus Sannon =

Haitian historian, politician and diplomat (1870–1938)

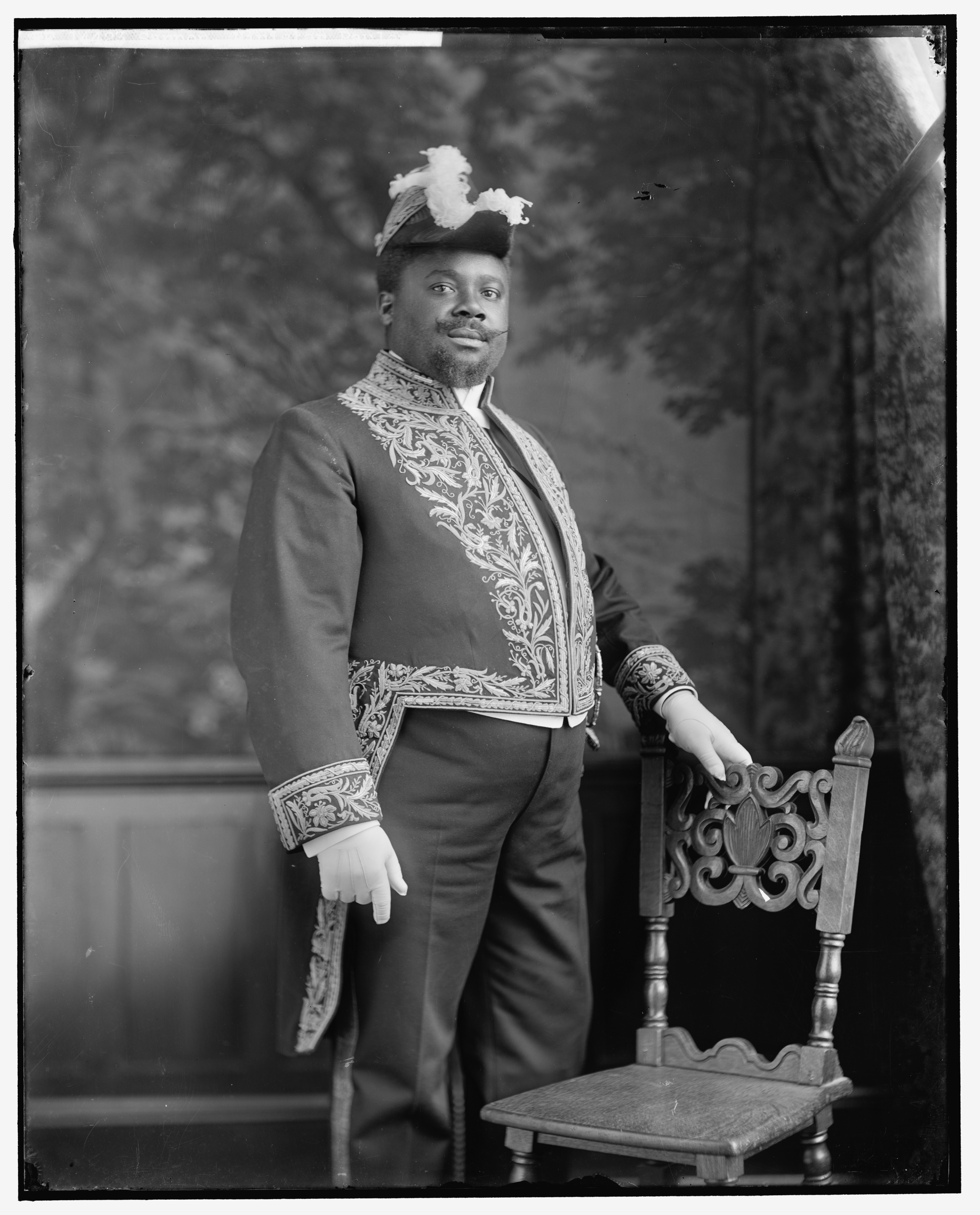

Minister of Foreign Affairs, Haiti
- In office 21 May 1906 – 17 February 1908
- Preceded by: Murville Férère
- Succeeded by: Louis Borno

Minister of Foreign Affairs, Haiti
- In office 14 August 1915 – 9 September 1915
- Preceded by: Ulrick Duvivier
- Succeeded by: Louis Borno

Personal details
- Born: Horace Pauleus Sannon; 7 April 1870 Les Cayes, Haiti
- Died: 27 August 1938 (age 88)
- Education: Collège de France

Horace Pauleus Sannon (7 April 1870 – 27 August 1938) was a Haitian historian, politician and diplomat.

Born in Les Cayes, Pauleus Sannon began medical studies at the Sorbonne in Paris, France, but abandoned them to study social-political sciences at the Collège de France. While still in France, he published his first book, Haiti et le régime parlementaire.

He wrote several books on the history of Haiti, including Essai historique sur la révolution de 1843 and Histoire de Toussaint Louverture. Scholars consider the latter to be his most important work, influencing the views of both Haitians and non-Haitians on the Haitian Revolution. C. L. R. James in 1938 called the book "the best biography yet written of Toussaint." As a historian, he had a reputation for scrupulously backing up his statements with evidence.

He was a co-founder, and the first president, of Haiti's Société d'Histoire et de Geographie, a group of Haitian intellectuals formed in 1924 who saw studying the past as a means to generate national pride and understand the conditions of the present (at the time, Haiti was occupied by United States Marines). The Société popularized history among the public.

He served as Haiti's Minister of Foreign Affairs in 1906, and negotiated a trade treaty with France. He was appointed Haitian Minister to the United States in 1909. He was a Haitian presidential candidate in 1926 and 1930.

== Works ==
- Haïti et le régime parlementaire
- Un journaliste sous Boyer: Darfour (1898)
- Histoire de Toussaint Louverture Volume 1
- Histoire de Toussaint Louverture Volume 2
- Histoire de Toussaint Louverture Volume 3
