= List of ambassadors of Haiti to Germany =

Coordinates: 52.505093°N 13.325454°E

Ambassador of Haiti to Germany
- Incumbent; Jean Robert Saget since August 24, 2005
- Inaugural holder: Demesvar Delorme
- Formation: 1891

The Haitian ambassador in Berlin is the official representative of the Government in Port-au-Prince to the Government of Germany. The current ambassador Jean Robert Saget is related with Jean-Nicolas Nissage Saget.

== List of representatives ==
Diplomatic agrément/ Diplomatic accreditation	Ambassador	Observations	List of heads of state of Haiti	List of chancellors of Germany	Term end
1891		Till 1891 the head of the fr:Ambassade d'Haïti en France was accredited in Berlin.	François Denys Légitime	Leo von Caprivi	1891
1891	Demesvar Delorme	(1831-1901)	François Denys Légitime	Leo von Caprivi	1897
1897		vakant	Tirésias Simon-Sam	Chlodwig, Prince of Hohenlohe-Schillingsfürst	1899
1899	Jean-Joseph Dalbémar	(* 1839) From May 1902 till December 1902 he was head of the fr:Ambassade d'Haïti en France	Tirésias Simon-Sam	Chlodwig, Prince of Hohenlohe-Schillingsfürst	1909
1909	Callistène Fouchard	ministre des finances d'Haïti	François C. Antoine Simon	Theobald von Bethmann Hollweg	1914
1914	Léon Audain	(* December 27, 1863 in Port-au-Prince; September 1930 in Paris)	Oreste Zamor	Theobald von Bethmann Hollweg	1915
1915		vakant	Jean Vilbrun Guillaume Sam	Theobald von Bethmann Hollweg	June 5, 1917
June 5, 1917		Suspension of diplomatic relations Protecting power Spain.	Philippe Sudré Dartiguenave	Georg Michaelis	1921
1921	Fernand Dennis	*From 1926 to 1940 he was ambassador to Havana, from 1941 he was Haitian Ambassador to the United States	Philippe Sudré Dartiguenave	Joseph Wirth	1923
1923	Georges Gentil	*From October 9, 1889 till March 24, 1896 he was Chargé d'affaires in Madrid.	Louis Bornó	Wilhelm Marx	1925
1925	Charles Bouchereau	Minister of Public Instruction	Louis Bornó	Hans Luther	1928
1928	Luc Dominique	27 septembre 1923 – 20 octobre 1924: fr:Liste des ministres haïtiens des Cultes	Louis Bornó	Hermann Müller	August 2, 1930
August 2, 1930	Pétien Boncy		Louis Eugène Roy	Heinrich Brüning	March 18, 1931
1934	Constantin Fouchard	(+1942)	Sténio Vincent	Adolf Hitler	December 18, 1941
December 18, 1941		Suspension of diplomatic relations Protecting power Switzerland	Élie Lescot	Adolf Hitler	April 30, 1945
1956	Jean Duvigneaud		Paul Eugène Magloire	Konrad Adenauer	1957
1957	Yvon Perrier	1989–1990:Foreign Ministers of Haiti	Antonio Thrasybule Kebreau	Konrad Adenauer	1958
1958	Franck M. Beauvoir	(*April 25, 1914 in Port au Prince) Colonel, son of Jeanne Roy and Michel Beauvoir, In 1936 married with Anetta Jannini	François Duvalier	Konrad Adenauer	July 14, 1967
July 14, 1967	Carlet R. Auguste	(* 14 June 1903 in Cap-Haïtien) Professor.: 8 Dec. 1923 m. Marie Ed. Etienne.; 5 children.; Education: Free School of Law. Cap-Haiti. Graduate in Law 1937.; Appointments- Tradesman in Coffee Business; Professor of Political Economy.; From 1939 to 1959 he was Graduate of Law. Free School of Law. Cap-Haiti, Professor of Civil law.; From 1959 to 1967 he was employed next to the Headquarters of the United Nations.; From 1972 to 1976 he was Permanent Representative to the Headquarters of the United Nations.; (1972 Président de la Commission Politiqui de VO.N.U.	Jean-Claude Duvalier	Willy Brandt	1972
April 18, 1972	Fritz D Jean-Baptiste	1967: Chargé d'affaires to the Holy See	Jean-Claude Duvalier	Willy Brandt	
October 21, 1976	Edouard Francisque		Jean-Claude Duvalier	Helmut Schmidt	June 9, 1981
June 9, 1981	Serge Élie Charles	1988–1989: Foreign Ministers of Haiti	Jean-Claude Duvalier	Helmut Schmidt	
August 30, 1983	Francois Guillaume		Jean-Claude Duvalier	Helmut Kohl	
March 19, 1985	Jean-Claude Andre		Jean-Claude Duvalier	Helmut Kohl	
1987	Jean Robert Saget		Henri Namphy	Helmut Kohl	
1996	Alrich Nicolas	In November 1999 the embassy moved to Berlin	René Préval	Helmut Kohl	August 24, 2005
August 24, 2005	Jean Robert Saget		Boniface Alexandre	Angela Merkel	2014
2014	Patrick Saint Hilaire	Chargé d'affaires	Michel Martelly	Angela Merkel	
2015	Frantz Bataille	Chargé d'affaires	Michel Martelly	Angela Merkel	
2016	Michèle Dominique Raymond	Chargé d'affaires	Jocelerme Privert	Angela Merkel	
