= Liévano–Brutus treaty =

1978 treaty between Colombia and Haiti

Agreement on Delimitation of the Maritime Boundaries between the Republic of Colombia and the Republic of Haiti
- Type: Boundary delimitation
- Signed: 17 February 1978
- Location: Port-au-Prince, Haiti
- Effective: 16 February 1979
- Parties: Colombia; Haiti
- Depositary: United Nations Secretariat
- Language: French; Haitian Creole; Spanish

The Liévano–Brutus treaty is a treaty that defined the maritime boundary between the Republic of Colombia and Haiti. The treaty was signed in the town of Port-au-Prince on February 17, 1978. The treaty was approved by the Congress of Colombia by Law 12 of 1978. Ratification of the treaty was officially done on February 16, 1979. The treaty also stipulates that there must be cooperation on environmental issues and the protection of migratory species.

The full name of the treaty is Agreement on Delimitation of the Maritime Boundaries between the Republic of Colombia and the Republic of Haiti. It is named for the foreign ministers of the two countries that signed the agreement—Indalecio Liévano of Colombia and Edner Brutus of Haiti.

== See also ==
- Foreign relations of Colombia
- Foreign relations of Haiti
