= Jean-Chrisostôme Imbert =

Jean-Chrisostôme Imbert (1779–1855) was a Haitian politician, chief financial officer, in charge of executive power as interim president.

== Biography ==
Jean-Chrisostôme Imbert was Chief Financial Officer. Under the political regime of Alexander Pétion, he was entrusted with the executive power in the southern part of the island of Haiti during the partition of the country between the North, in the hands of Henri Christophe, and the South under the presidency of Petion.

He was on three occasions interim president of Haiti and Minister of Finance under the united Republic of Haiti.

Jean-Chrisostôme Imbert was Minister of Finance at several times:

- July 1808 – November 1808 under Alexander Pétion;
- May 1810 – March 1818 under Alexandre Pétion;
- April 1818 – February 1842 under Jean-Pierre Boyer;
- April 1843 – January 1844 in the Provisional Government;
- January 1844 – February 1844 under Charles Rivière-Hérard.

Jean-Chrisostôme Imbert assumed the office of the executive power as interim president:

- 9–10 March 1811;
- 9 March 1815 – 10 March 1815;
- 29 March 1818 – 1 April 1818.

== See also ==
- List of heads of state of Haiti
