= Jean-Victor Harvel Jean-Baptiste =

Former minister of foreign affairs and religious affairs of Haiti

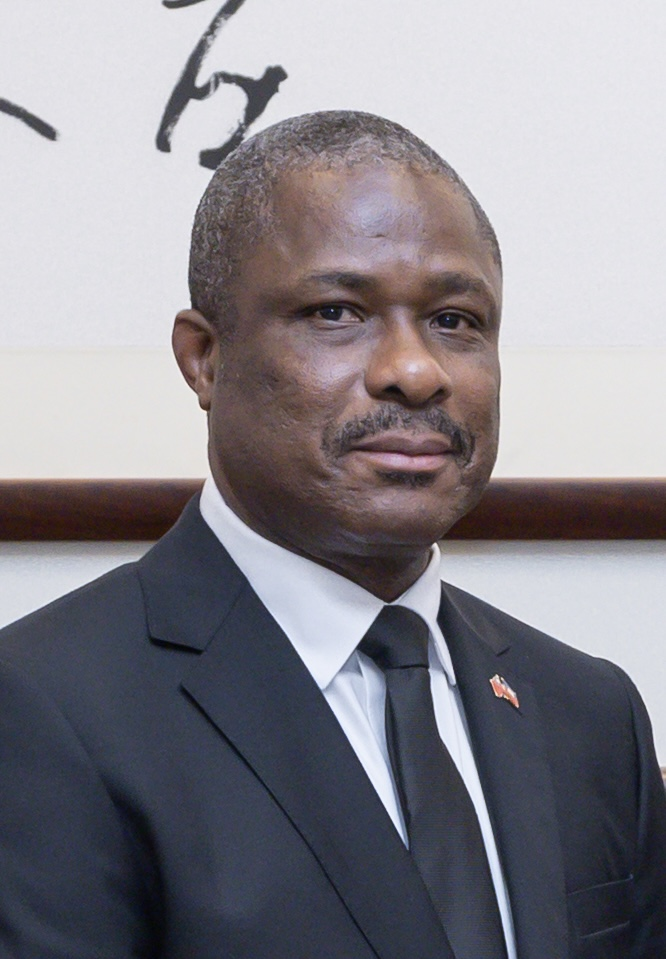

86th Minister of Foreign Affairs
- In office 16 November 2024 – 4 March 2026
- Prime Minister: Alix Didier Fils-Aimé
- Preceded by: Dominique Dupuy
- Succeeded by: Raina Forbin

Jean-Victor Harvel Jean-Baptiste (French pronunciation: [ʒɑ̃ viktɔʁ aʁvɛl ʒɑ̃ batist]) is a Haitian politician. He was Haiti's minister of foreign affairs and religious affairs until he was succeeded by Raina Forbin in March 2026. In January 2025, he warned during a United Nations Security Council meeting that "the very survival of the state" of Haiti was at risk in the face of gang violence.

== Life ==
Jean-Baptiste completed his high school at the Collège Canado-Haïtien in Port-au-Prince. He went on to obtain a degree in psychology at the State University of Haiti. In 1990, Jean-Baptiste earned a diploma in development studies at the Graduate Institute of International and Development Studies in Geneva, Switzerland. He married Tatiana Florencio Silva Jean-Baptiste.

He joined Haiti's diplomatic service in 1993. Jean-Baptiste served as Haiti's ambassador to Chile and to the Organization of American States. In 2001, he was named inspector general of the Haitian National Police. Simultaneously, he became a member of a presidential commission set up to resolve a territorial conflict at the Dominican Republic–Haiti border.
