= Solon Ménos =

Haitian writer and politician

Haitian Ambassador to the United States from Haiti to United States
- In office November 21, 1911 – October 14, 1918
- Preceded by: H. Paulens Sannon
- Succeeded by: ht:Albert Blanchet

Personal details
- Born: 9 March 1859 Anse-à-Veau
- Died: 14 October 1918 (aged 59) Washington, D.C.

Solon Ménos (9 March 1859 – 14 October 1918) was a Haitian writer and politician. Born in Anse-à-Veau, Ménos studied in France and received a doctorate in law there at the age of twenty-two. A prominent politician, Ménos served as Haiti's minister to Washington, D.C., and Minister of Finance in 1897. He was a poet and the author of L'Affaire Lüders (English: The Lüders Affair), which described the conflict between Haiti and Germany during Tirésias Simon Sam's presidency.
