= Léon Laleau =

Haitian writer, politician and diplomat

Léon Laleau (3 August 1892 – 7 September 1979) was a Haitian writer, politician, and diplomat. Laleau is still recognized "as one of the most brilliant writers of his time". He received several international awards, such as the Edgar Allan Poe Prize in 1962. He was also a member of the Ronsard Academy, the Académie Méditerranéenne (Mediterranean Academy). He was recipient of numerous honors, including The Legion of Honor rank of Grand Officer (France), Saint Grégoire (Vatican), and Palms Académique, Arts et Lettres rank of Commandeur (France).

Born in Port-au-Prince, Laleau held two degrees, one in law and another in letters and sciences. As a politician, he was appointed Foreign Minister and Minister of National Education, Agriculture, and Public Works. He served in numerous diplomatic positions, such as Chief of Diplomatic Missions in Rome, London, Paris, Santiago, and Lima and Special Mission Ambassador to Panama, Cuba, the United Nations, and UNESCO. He was a signer of the 24 July 1934 accord which ended the United States' occupation of Haiti.

== Selected works ==
- Jusqu'au Bord (1916) - novel
- La Danse des Vagues (1919) - novel
- A Voix Basse (1920) - compilation of poems
- La Flèche au Cœur (1926) - compilation of poems
- Le Rayon des Jupes (1928) - compilation of poems
- Abréviations (1928) - compilation of poems
- Musique Nègre (1931) - poem
- Le Choc (1932) - novel
- Ondes Courtes (1933) - poem
- La Pluie et le Beau Temps - play
- Le Tremplin - play
