= Hannibal Price =

Haitian diplomat (1875–1946)

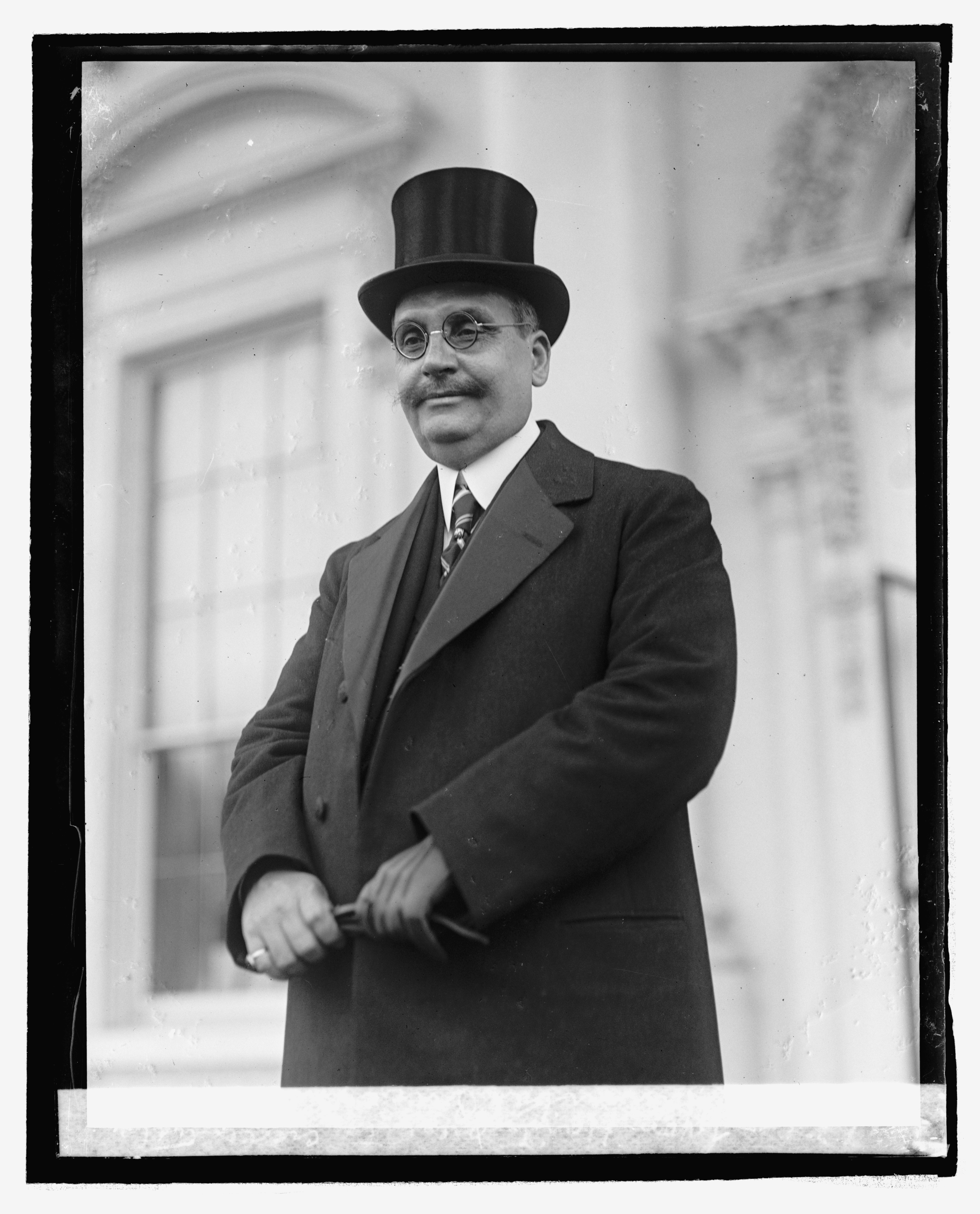

Haitian Ambassador to the United States
- In office February 10, 1925 – May 26, 1928
- Preceded by: León Dejean
- Succeeded by: Raoul Lizaire

[[Haitian Minister of Agriculture. Minister of Finance of Haiti. ]]
- In office November 27, 1929 – January 27, 1930
- Preceded by: Charles Bouchereau
- Succeeded by: Élie Lescot

Personal details
- Born: July 9, 1875 Cap-Haïtien, Haiti
- Died: December 31, 1946 (aged 71)
- Spouse: Marie Amelie Lizaire (?-1947)
- Parents: Philippe Hannibal Price (father); Josephine Curet (mother)
- Education: Classical studies, College of Beauvais, France. Graduate National Law School Port-au-Prince, Hayti.

Hannibal Price (July 9, 1875-1946) was a Haitian diplomat and politician.

From 1911 to 1913 he was Secretary at the Haitian Legation in Washington, D.C. He returned to Haiti, where he became counselor to the National Bureau du Contentieux. Some time later, Doctor Price was named Counselor of State, a position which, in conjunction with that of consulting counsel to the American financial counselor in Port-au-Prince.

From February 10, 1925 to May 26, 1928 he served as Minister Plenipotentiary to Washington, D.C. From November 27, 1929 till January 27, 1930 he was Haitian Minister of Agriculture.
