= Liautaud Ethéart =

Haitian playwright and politician

Liautaud Ethéart (1826–1888) was a Haitian playwright and politician. Born in Port-au-Prince, Ethéart served as Secretary of State in 1879. He was Minister of Finance 1872-1873 and 1876-1877. He is best remembered for his theatrical works.

== Selected works ==
- Le Monde de Chez Nous (1857)
- Miscellanées (1858)
- La Fille de l'Empereur (1860)
- Un Duel sous Blanchelande (1860)
