= Ertha Pascal-Trouillot =

Haitian politician

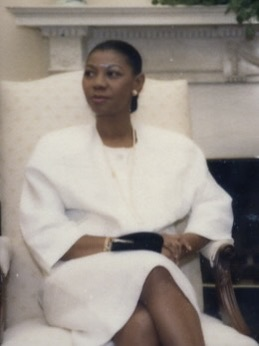
- Pascal-Trouillot at the White House, 24 May 1990

President of Haiti
- Provisional
- In office 13 March 1990 – 7 February 1991
- Preceded by: Hérard Abraham
- Succeeded by: Jean-Bertrand Aristide

Personal details
- Born: 13 August 1943 (age 83) Pétion-Ville, Haiti
- Party: Independent
- Spouse: Ernst Trouillot
- Relatives: Michel-Rolph Trouillot (stepson)
- Education: University of Haiti

Ertha Pascal-Trouillot (French pronunciation: [ɛʁta paskal tʁujo]; born 13 August 1943) is a Haitian politician who served as the provisional President of Haiti for 11 months in 1990 and 1991. She was the first woman in Haitian history to hold that office and the first female president of African descent in the Americas.

== Early life, family and education ==
Ertha Pascal-Trouillot was born on August 13, 1943, in the well-to-do suburb of Pétion-Ville in the hills above the crowded capital. Her father, Thimbles, was an iron worker and died when she was young. Her mother Louise (née Dumornay) was a seamstress and embroiderer. Pascal-Trouillot was the ninth of ten children. When she was 10 years old, she and one of her brothers went to the Lycée François Duvalier and was mentored by her future husband, Ernst Trouillot, who was "more than 20 years her senior."

When she started university, she wanted to pursue a career in science but she met her mentor who convinced her to pursue it in law and later in politics. In 1971, she received her law degree from the École de Droit des Gonaïves in Port-au-Prince.

== Career ==
Pascal-Trouillot has served as a lawyer, writer, teacher, and Supreme Court justice.

During the Duvalier dynasty, she became Haiti’s first female judge when she was appointed to the Court of First Instance. In 1986, the then-Minister of Justice, François Latortue, appointed Pascal-Trouillot to the Supreme Court, making her the first woman to serve on that court..

While serving as Chief Justice, she became the country’s provisional president on March 13, 1990, assuming responsibility for organizing a general election. She oversaw generally peaceful elections that brought Jean-Bertrand Aristide to the presidency with 67% of the vote.

Working behind the scenes, Pascal-Trouillot oversaw a committee that helped manage both the affairs of the country and the electoral process. She reportedly received support from the army, but after Aristide’s victory, she was arrested and charged with involvement in a coup. There was never conclusive proof linking her to the coup. Due to alleged U.S. intervention, she was released within a day. She subsequently stepped away from active politics and left Haiti. Pascal-Trouillot later returned to Haiti but largely remained out of the public eye. Since then, she has been compiling the history of Haiti.

As Provisional President, Pascal-Trouillot’s primary task was to guide Haiti toward early elections in coordination with a 19-member Council of State, which held veto power over her decisions. She oversaw the council’s operations to avert conflict and fulfill her duties to serve the public. She also announced the reopening of schools, which had been closed for over a week due to protests against the military rule of Lt. Gen. Prosper Avril.

Pascal-Trouillot steered Haiti through its initial transition from dictatorship to a new democracy with free elections. She worked with Karl Auguste on a commission to revise Haiti’s civil and penal codes following the collapse of the Duvalier regime. According to an article in “L’union Suite,” Haiti’s democracy, while fragile, has endured through additional coups d’état, economic hardships, and natural disasters. In the wake of Pascal-Trouillot’s leadership, more women began running for important offices—including positions as senators, deputies, ministers, and even the presidency.

== Personal life ==
Pascal-Trouillot's brother Alix was paralyzed from the waist down by a bullet from one of the Duvalier soldiers. Another brother, Andre, was arrested and threatened with execution.

She was married for over 40 years to Ernst Trouillot, a journalist, lawyer, and teacher. Their daughter's name is Yantha. Ernst is the father of Michel-Rolph Trouillot, an anthropologist. Ernst Trouillot was a major force in shaping Ertha's life. He was more than 20 years her senior. She met him when she was a teenage girl in one of his social classes. Due to her intelligence, he encouraged her to go to law school. Ernst died from a stroke. He served as counsel to the National Bank, from which the dictators are said to have obtained a fortune (though they were not supporters of the Duvaliers).

Pascal-Trouillot has resided in Haiti as well as New York City.

== See also ==
- First women lawyers around the world

Political offices
| Preceded by Hérard Abraham; Acting | President of Haiti; Acting; 1990–1991 | Succeeded by Jean-Bertrand Aristide |
