= Raina Forbin =

Haitian politician

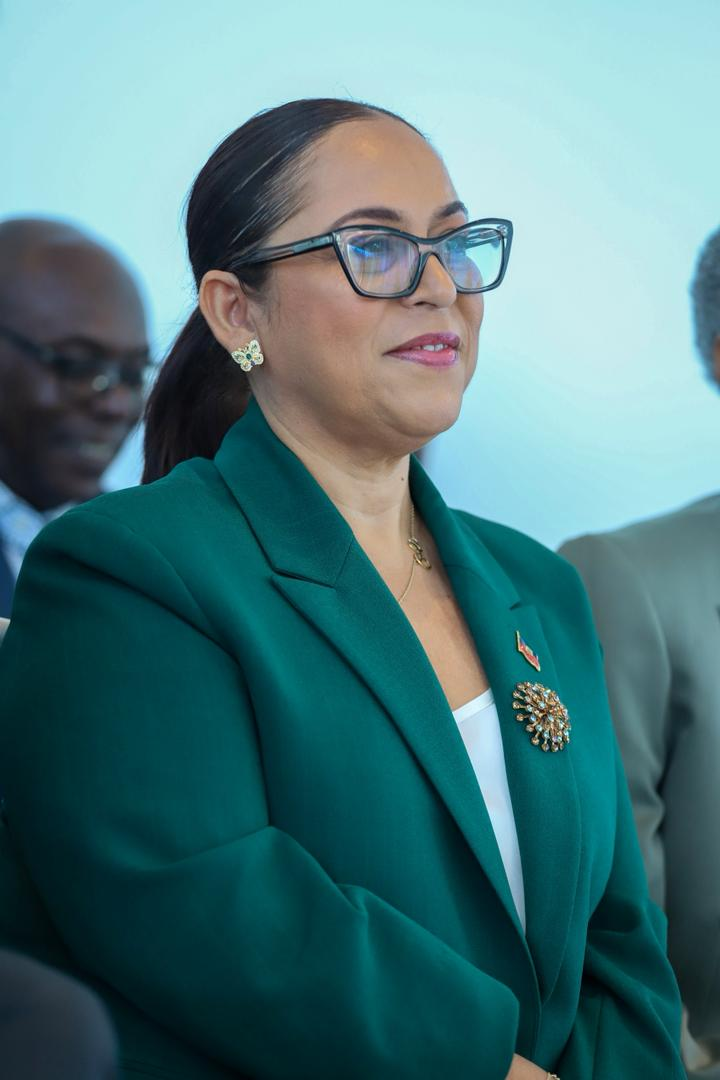
- Forbin in 2026

Minister of Foreign Affairs and Religious Affairs
- Incumbent
- Assumed office 4 March 2026
- Prime Minister: Alix Didier Fils-Aimé
- Preceded by: Jean-Victor Harvel Jean-Baptiste

Chief of Staff to the President of the Presidential Transitional Council
- In office 2025–2026

Personal details
- Born: 1973 or 1974 (age 52–53) Haiti
- Education: Université du Québec

Raina Forbin is a Haitian businesswoman and diplomat. She was appointed Minister of Foreign Affairs and Religious Affairs of Haiti in March 2026, in a context of democratic transition.

== Biography ==
=== Career in the private sector ===
Raina Forbin has experience in the Haitian tourism sector and participates in initiatives of the Haitian private sector.

== Political career ==
In 2025, she was appointed Chief of Staff to Laurent Saint-Cyr, President of the Transitional Presidential Council (CPT). In this role, she coordinated the activities of the presidential office and participated in diplomatic missions, notably at international forums. On 4 March 2026, Raina Forbin was appointed Minister of Foreign Affairs and Worship (MAEC) by Prime Minister Alix Didier Fils-Aimé. In this capacity, she was responsible for conducting the foreign policy of Haiti, particularly strengthening diplomatic relations and representing the country internationally. Originally from the commune of Gonaïves, she was born and raised in Haiti. She is fluent in Créole, French, English and Spanish, and also has a deep love for art.

== Career ==
Raina Forbin completed her studies in Haiti and at the University of Quebec at Montreal (UQAM). Her background, enriched by experiences in the Dominican Republic, Canada and the United States, gives her a nuanced understanding of regional and international dynamics.

With over thirty-five years of experience in business management, she has distinguished herself through her ability to restructure, reorganize, and modernize institutions. Her career demonstrates a proven aptitude for establishing governance standards, leading reforms, and strengthening institutional performance. She has also spearheaded several initiatives aimed at redefining Haiti's international image by promoting its tourism, heritage, culture, and economic potential.

Raina Forbin is known as a prominent figure in the Haitian tourism sector. She was president of the Haitian Tourism Association (ATH), where she played a leading role in promoting tourism and defending the interests of professionals in the sector. She is also a founding member of the Chinese Chamber of Commerce in Haiti and the Haitian Chamber of Conciliation and Arbitration.

She is a co-founder of a foundation working for the well-being and access to education of children in vulnerable situations.

Raina Forbin has worked in both the private and public sector. In this capacity, she actively participated in the work that led to the...Agreement of April 3 which made way for the establishment of the Transitional Presidential Council.

In November 2025, she was called upon to serve as Chief of Staff to the president of the Transitional Presidential Council (CPT), Laurent Saint-Cyr. She was appointed Minister of Foreign Affairs and Religious Affairs of Haiti in March 2026.
