= Clément Haentjens =

Haitian diplomat and politician

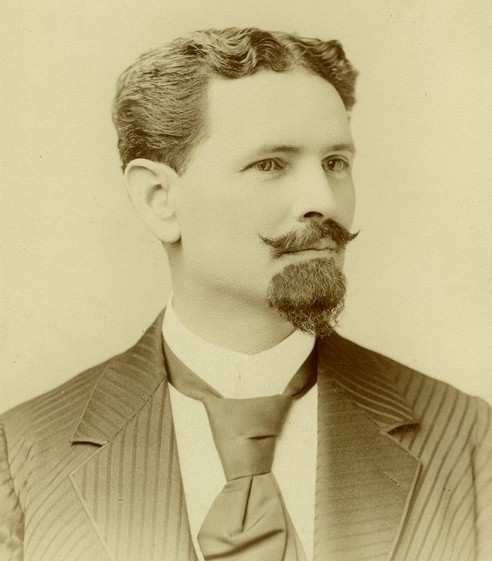

Secretary of State of Public Works and of Agriculture
- In office 29 October 1889 – 1 August 1890
- President: Florvil Hyppolite
- Preceded by: Néré Numa (Agriculture)
- Succeeded by: Hugon Lechaud

Personal details
- Born: 30 May 1847 Port-au-Prince, Haiti
- Died: 16 January 1923 (aged 75) Paris, France
- Spouse: Clara Wilkens

Clément Haentjens (born 30 May 1847 – 16 January 1923) was a Haitian diplomat and politician.

== Biography ==
Haentjens is the son of Charles Haentjens, a former Haitian diplomat. He followed the same diplomatic career of his father and became Secretary of the legation of Haiti in Washington from 27 March 1870 to June 1874.

He was the first Secretary of State of Public Works and also held the portfolio of Agriculture from 29 October 1889 to 1 August 1890, and particularly Chief of Staff President of Haiti from 4 August 1891 to October 1892.

He eventually founded a diplomatic post as envoy extraordinary and minister plenipotentiary of Haiti to London October 8, 1892, and in Washington January 18, 1893, following the death of Philippe Hannibal Price. He moved to Paris after resigning from his post in Washington in 1896.
