= Ernest Roumain =

Haitian diplomat

Ernest Roumain was a public official in Haiti and served as its leading diplomat to the United States. He served as foreign minister and then in the cabinet of President of Haiti Boisrond Canal.

Roumain served as Haiti's representative in France in 1859, succeeding Beaubrun Ardouin. He came to Washington D.C. in 1863, establishing Haiti's delegation to the U.S., and met with Abraham Lincoln and William Seward. A woman in attendance at an official dinner he attended found it difficult not to gawk and noted he spoke three languages and had refined manners. He moved to New York City the same year.

He later lived as an exile in St. Thomas. He served as Fabre Nicolas Geffrard's private secretary.

His son Edmond Roumain was a professor in Haiti and tried to promote U.S. investment in Haiti's mines. Ernest Roumain was the great-grandfather of Georges Nicolas Leger who established the hotel that became Hotel Léger. Yale University has a correspondence from Roumain.

== See also ==
- List of ambassadors of Haiti to the United States
