= Jean Rénald Clérismé =

Haitian politician, diplomat and Catholic priest

Jean-Rénald Clérismé (November 7, 1937 – October 29, 2013) was a Haitian politician, diplomat and former Catholic priest. He served as the Foreign Minister of Haiti from 9 June 2006 to 2008.

Clérismé began his career as a Roman Catholic priest. He was ambassador of Haiti to the World Trade Organization (WTO), the International Trade Center (ITC), the United Nations Conference on Trade and Development (UNCTAD), and the International Telecommunication Union (ITU) in Geneva, Switzerland, from 2001 to 2003.

Clérismé completed his B.A. in France, 1967; received a M.A. in Anthropology, from New York University, in 1975, and also a M.A. in Philosophy from Yale University in 1993. In addition he received his Ph.D., in Anthropology from Yale in 1996 as a Fulbright Scholar. The title of his doctoral dissertation was "Migration and Relations of Production in the Dominican Coffee Economy: Haitian Workers on El Fondo Coffee Plantations." He was also the author of other scholarly works on Haitian society.
