= Jean-Baptiste Hilaire =

French painter

Jean-Baptiste Hilaire ( or Hilair) (1751–1828) was a French painter.

He was born at Audun-le-Tiche in north-east France, the son of Jean-Francois Hiller (Hilaire) and Marie-Calixte Ronfort and enrolled in March 1786 at the Royal Academy of Painting and Sculpture in Paris. There he was a pupil of the painter Charles-Louis Clérisseau and the painter and sculptor Jean-Baptiste Le Prince.

In 1776, aged 25, he toured the Greek islands and the Orient, creating over a hundred works which he used to illustrate his "Voyagé Pittoresque de la Grèce", published in three volumes in 1782. His talent became recognised and his work exhibited in Paris at such places as the Salon de la Jeunesse in 1780, and at the Salon de la Correspondence the same year. He took part in the official exhibitions of the Louvre in the salon of 1796.

He continued painting until 1796 after which he fades from the records. He died in Paris in 1828.

== Selected works ==
- La Musique, (Music), 1781, oil on canvas, 136 by 118 cm, Louvre Museum Inventory No 5353 Joconde website
- La Lecture (Reading), 1781, oil on canvas, 136 x 113 cm, Louvre Museum Inventory No 5352 Joconde website
- L'esclave heureux (The Happy Slave), Joconde website
- Paysage Oriental (Oriental landscape), Joconde website
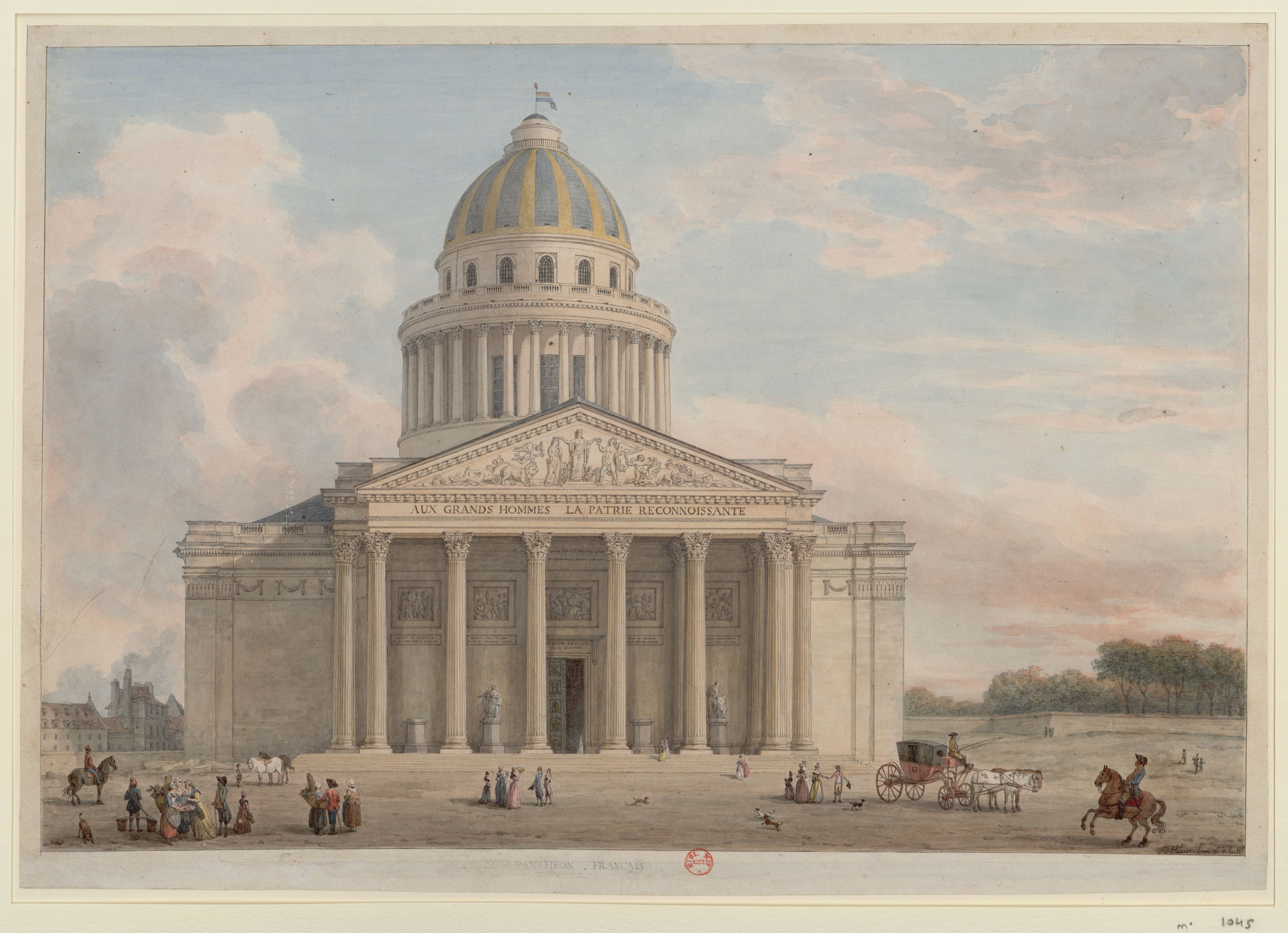
The Pantheon, Paris, 1795

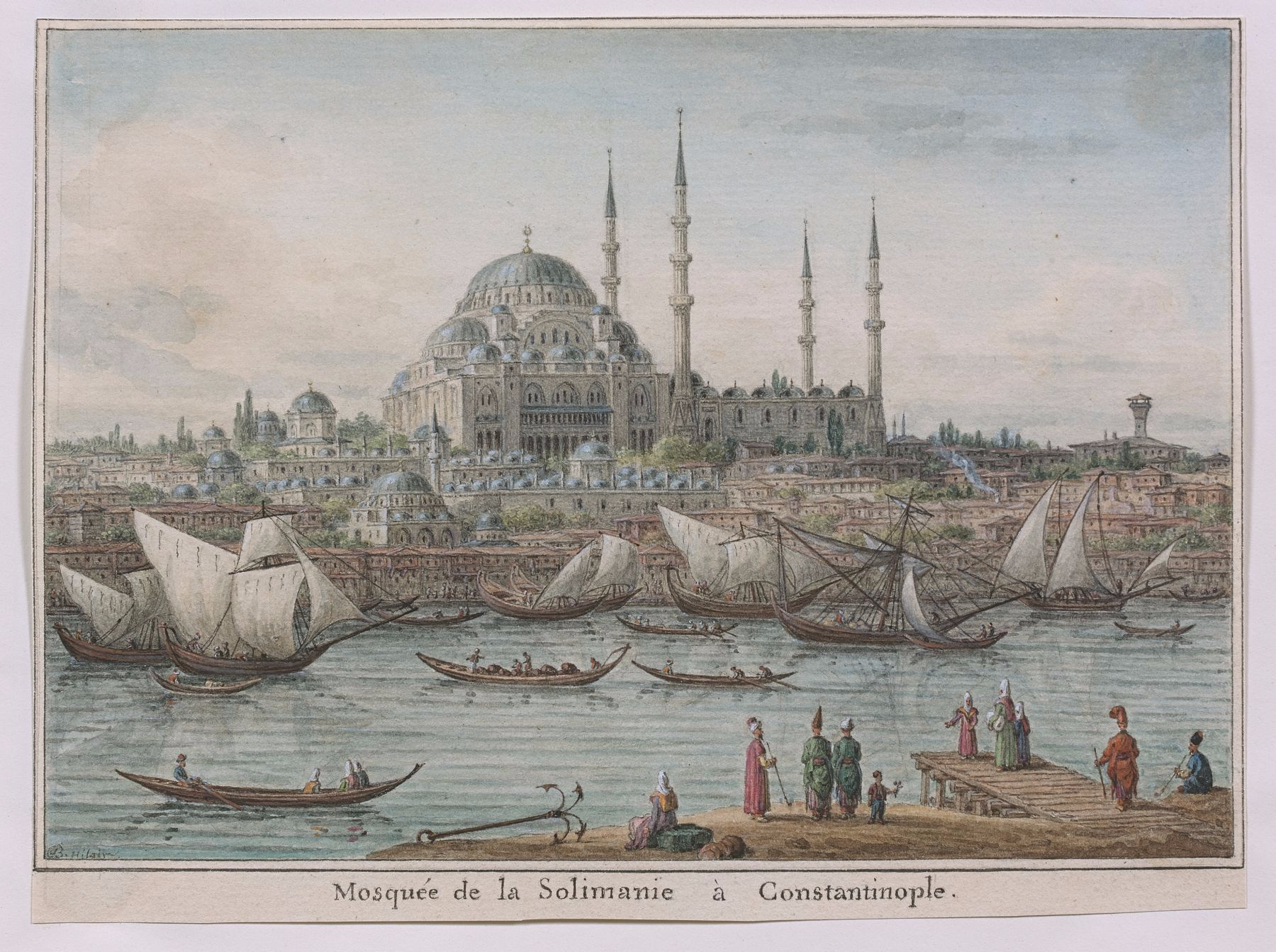
Suleiman Mosque at Constantinople, watercolour

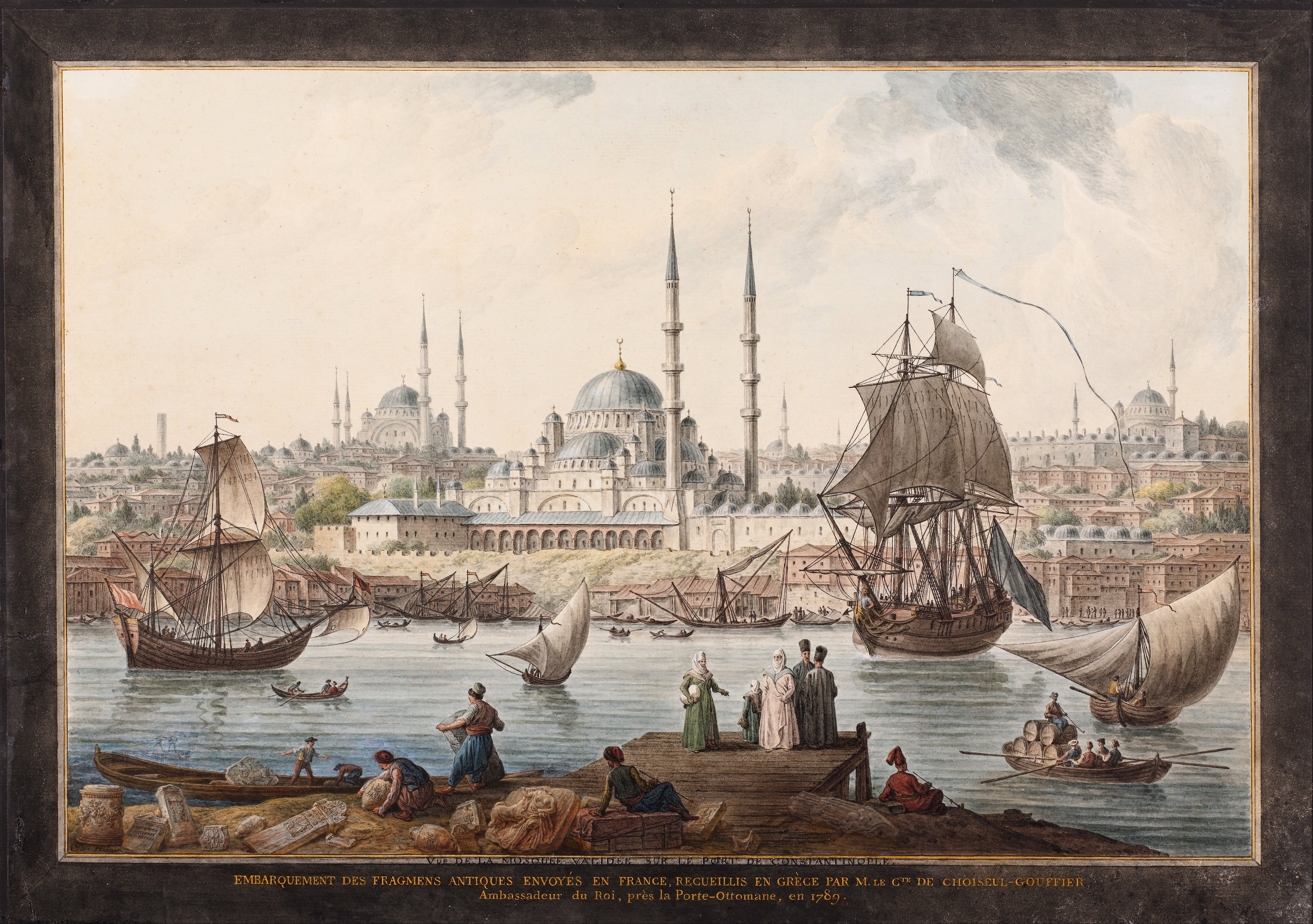
Yeni Camii (New Mosque) and The Port of İstanbul, watercolour

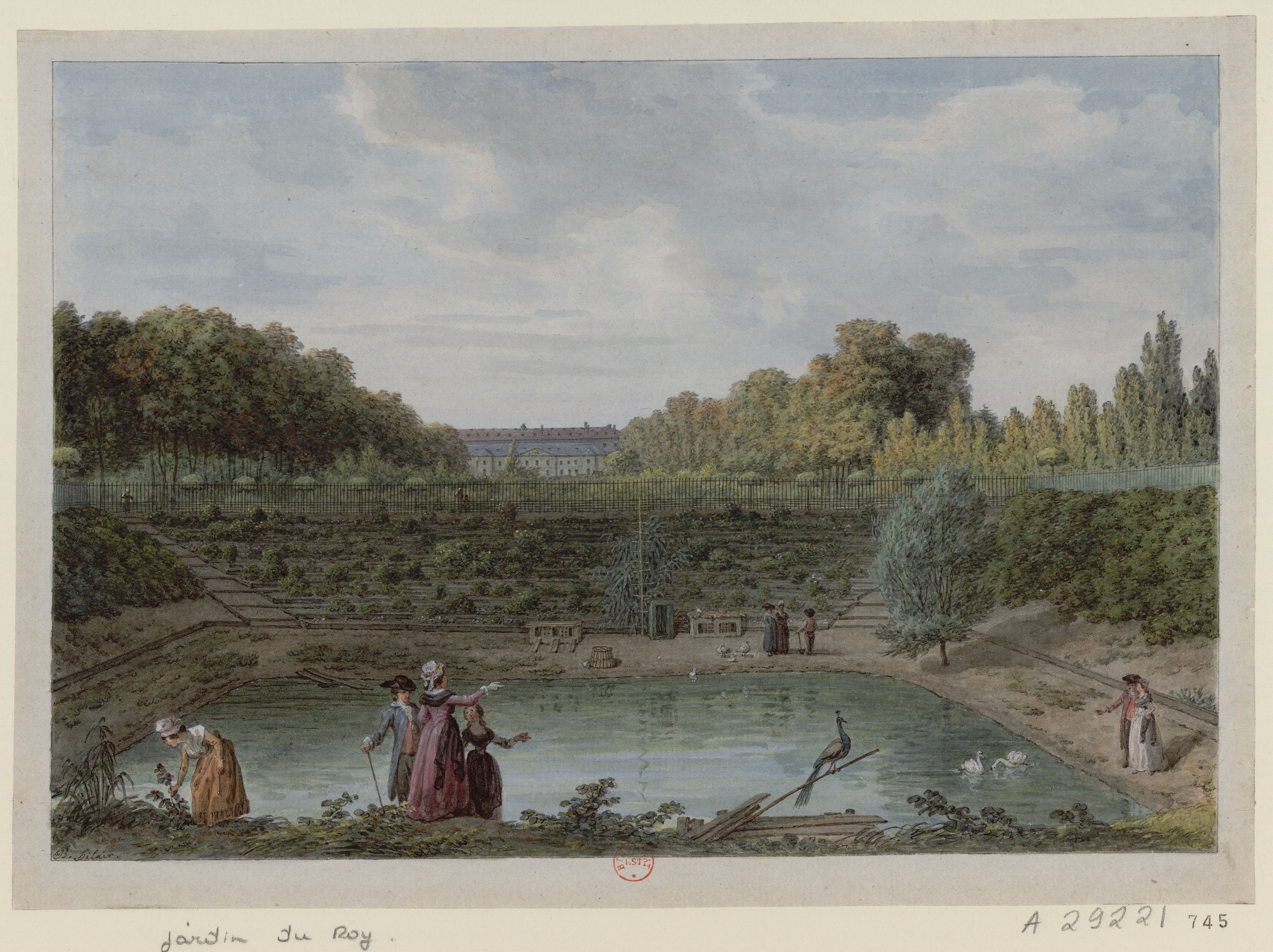
Bassin aquatique dans le Jardin du Roy
