= Smarck Michel =

Haitian politician (1937–2012)

6th Prime Minister of Haiti
- In office November 8, 1994 – November 7, 1995
- President: Jean-Bertrand Aristide
- Preceded by: Robert Malval
- Succeeded by: Claudette Werleigh

Minister of Commerce
- In office February 19, 1991 – June 14, 1991
- President: Jean-Bertrand Aristide
- Prime Minister: René Préval
- Preceded by: Jean Mainville
- Succeeded by: Jean-François Chamblain

Personal details
- Born: Georges Jean-Jacques Smarck Michel; March 29, 1937 Saint-Marc, Haiti
- Died: September 1, 2012 (aged 75) Port-au-Prince, Haiti
- Children: 3, including Marjorie
- Occupation: Businessman

Georges Jean-Jacques Smarck Michel or Smarck Michel (French pronunciation: [smaʁk miʃɛl]; March 29, 1937 – September 1, 2012) was appointed prime minister of Haiti on October 27, 1994, occupying the post from November 8, 1994 to October 16, 1995. Smarck was President Aristide's third prime minister, and the first to be named after the President's return from exile.

== Early life ==
Michel was born in St. Marc to a military family and completed his post-secondary studies (business administration) in the United States.

Prior to politics Michel was a businessman running a grocery store and ran his family bakery.

== Political career ==
His political career began as Minister of Commerce and ended after his Prime Ministership.

== Personal life ==
Married to wife Victoire Marie-Rose Sterlin, with whom he had a son Kenneth and daughters Patricia and Marjorie Michel.

His daughter Marjorie Michel moved to Canada, where she worked for an unofficial ad hoc advocacy organization in the Quebec area. In 2025, she was named the Liberal Party candidate for Papineau and she was elected in the 2025 Canadian federal election. Following her election to Parliament, in May 2025 Prime Minister of Canada Mark Carney appointed Marjorie as Minister of Health during a Cabinet re-shuffle.

Michel died near Port-au-Prince from brain tumour at age 75.
