= Marie Michele Rey =

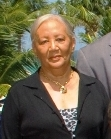
- Marie Michèle Rey in June 2010

Minister of Foreign Affairs
- In office November 2009 – 24 October 2011

Minister of Finance
- In office 8 November 1994 – 7 November 1995

Minister of Finance
- In office 1 September 1993 – 7 November 1993

Minister of Finance
- In office 19 February 1991 – 30 September 1991

Personal details
- Born: April 14, 1938 Haiti
- Died: January 2, 2019 (aged 80) Delmas

Marie Michèle Rey, nicknamed Mamie Rey, (17 April 1938 – 2 January 2019) was a Haitian politician. She served as minister of finance and minister of foreign affairs.

== Biography ==
Marie-Michele Rey was born on 17 April 1938 in Haiti. She was the daughter of a soldier who was imprisoned for a time under the dictatorship of François Duvalier, and who later became consul for Haiti to Jamaica. Her paternal grandfather was Jamaican. Her maternal grandfather was assassinated during the regime of Vilbrun Guillaume Sam.

She completed her primary and secondary education at various Catholic institutions: the Blue Sisters' school in Cap-Haïtien, the Sacred Heart Sisters' school in Port-au-Prince, and the Wisdom Sisters' school in Port-de-Paix. After obtaining her baccalaureate, she pursued a degree in Business Administration and Accounting at the Immaculate Conception High School in Jamaica in the late 1960s.

After her studies, she worked as an executive secretary for a representative of a Haitian-American project. She then married and put her professional career on hold for a time to raise her two children, a boy and a girl. Later, she taught English to young children while simultaneously undertaking various assignments for the Ethiopian and Chinese embassies.

Next, she stopped teaching and worked for the US Embassy before working for Citibank as a pro-manager officer in 1974. In 1983, she joined the Banque Nationale de Paris, where she managed a branch in Cap-Haïtien.

After holding several ministerial positions, she joined the board of directors of Téléco in the mid-1990s, then of the Maritime and Navigation Service of Haiti (SEMANAH).

In a turbulent political climate, she survived several assassination attempts, notably when her house was machine-gunned. Her husband was murdered in 1999.

She died on 2 January 2019 in Delmas from a heart attack.

== Political responsibilities ==
Rey had an important political career, having been a minister in Haiti five times:

- Minister of Finance (19 February 1991 to 30 September 1991)
- Minister of Finance (1 September 1993 to 7 November 1993)
- Minister of Finance (8 November 1994 to 7 November 1995) (resignation)
- Minister of Foreign Affairs and Religious Affairs (November 2009 to 14 May 2011)
- Minister of Foreign Affairs and Religious Affairs (14 May 2011 to 24 October 2011)

In February 1996, she became a member of the private cabinet of the President of the Republic, René Préval, in charge of economic matters.

She implemented Haiti's integration into the Caribbean Common Market (CARICOM) and was then appointed on 27 November 2006 to head the office for coordinating and monitoring the agreements of Caricom, the WTO and the FTAA.

== Community involvement ==
In 1982, she created with Josseline Colimon Féthière and Evelyne François the Haitian Fund for Women's Aid (FHAF), a microfinance institution for women.

In 1984, she founded the Association for the Promotion of the Haitian Family (PROFAMIL).

She founded, with Clorindre Zéphyr Enfofanm, a documentation and research center on women's emancipation movements.

== See also ==
- List of female foreign ministers
