= Ministry of Foreign Affairs and Worship (Haiti) =

Government ministry of Haiti

- Ministère des Affaires Étrangères et des Cultes (French); Ministè Afè Etranjè ak Adorasyon Repiblik d'Ayiti (Haitian Creole); MAEC
- Coat of arms of Haiti

Agency overview
- Type: Ministry; Ministry of Foreign Affairs; Ministries of Haiti
- Jurisdiction: Haiti and its diplomatic missions
- Headquarters: Gala Tower, 15 Mangones, Berthe, Pétion-Ville, Port-au-Prince, Haiti; 18°30′33″N 72°16′53″W
- Minister responsible: Raina Forbin, Minister of Foreign Affairs and Worship
- Parent agency: Executive branch of the Government of Haiti
- Website: mae.gouv.ht

The Ministry of Foreign Affairs and Worship (French: Ministère des Affaires Étrangères et des Cultes; Haitian Creole: Ministè Afè Etranjè ak Adorasyon Repiblik d'Ayiti, MAEC) is a ministry of the Government of Haiti. This ministry is responsible for international relations and is part of the Prime Minister's Cabinet.

== See also ==
- Foreign Ministers of Haiti
- List of diplomatic missions in Haiti
- List of diplomatic missions of Haiti
- Haitian passport
