= Lucien Hibbert =

Haitian mathematician and politician

Lucien Hibbert (18 August 1899 – 5 February 1964) was a Haitian public servant and mathematician. He was the first Haitian to receive a doctoral degree in mathematics and is remembered for his roles in government and higher education administration. In the administration of President Sténio Vincent, Hibbert served as the minister of finance for Haiti from 1932 to 1934 and was subsequently foreign minister until 1935. He was a commander of the French Legion of Honor.

Born to Fernand Hibbert and Marie Pescaye in 1899, Lucien Hibbert earned his doctoral degree from the Université de Paris in 1937. His dissertation consisted of two theses, Univalence et automorphie pour les polynômes et les fonctions entières and Sur les équations du problème de l'Interdépendance des Marchés. This work was supervised by Paul Montel, with advice from Georges Darmois, Frédéric Marty, and Jacques Salomon Hadamard.
