= Charles Haentjens =

Haitian diplomat and politician

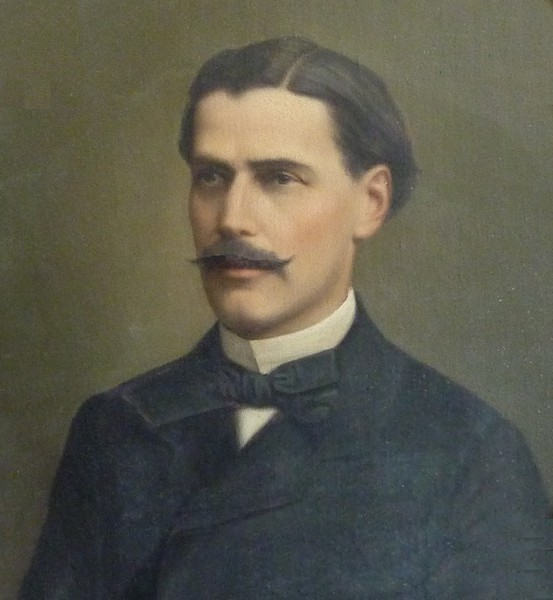

State Secretary of Finance and Trade
- In office 8 July 1873 – 21 July 1874
- President: Nissage Saget
- Preceded by: Octavius Rameau
- Succeeded by: Raoul Excellent

Personal details
- Born: 27 November 1821 Port-au-Prince, Haiti
- Died: 21 July 1874 (aged 52) Port-au-Prince, Haiti
- Spouse: Marie Anne Euphrosine Lynch

Charles Borromée Haentjens (27 November 1821 - 21 July 1874) was a Haitian diplomat and politician.

== Biography ==
Haentjens was the son of a merchant named Charles Christian Haëntjens, whose family moved to Nantes. Charles Haentjens returned to Paris in diplomacy as the Secretary of the Legation of Haiti from 1859 to 1863, where he conducted business from 1863 to 1864.

He was made State Secretary of Finance, Trade and External Relations of Haiti in 1871, then from 1873 to 1874. His son, Clément Haentjens also followed a diplomatic career and would be the State Secretary of Agriculture and Public Works.
