= Louis Eugène Roy =

27th President of Haiti in 1930

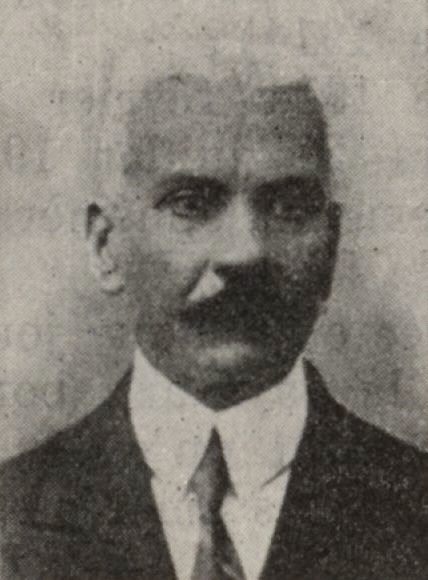

27th President of Haiti
- In office May 15, 1930 – November 18, 1930
- Preceded by: Louis Borno
- Succeeded by: Sténio Vincent

Personal details
- Born: 1861 Haiti
- Died: October 27, 1939 (aged 77–78) Port-au-Prince, Haiti
- Party: Haitian Conservative Party

Louis Eugène Roy (French pronunciation: [lwi øʒɛn ʁwa]; 1861 – 27 October 1939) was a prominent mulatto Haitian banker selected by U.S. General John H. Russell, Jr., the American High Commissioner to Haïti, to serve as that country's interim president following the resignation of Louis Borno. Roy served from 15 May to 18 November 1930, during which time his major duty was to oversee elections to the new National Assembly during the United States occupation of Haiti. When the Assembly selected Sténio Vincent as president, Roy stepped down.

Political offices
Preceded by Louis Borno	President of Haïti; 1930	Succeeded by Sténio Vincent
