= Louis Borno =

26th President of Haiti from 1922 to 1930

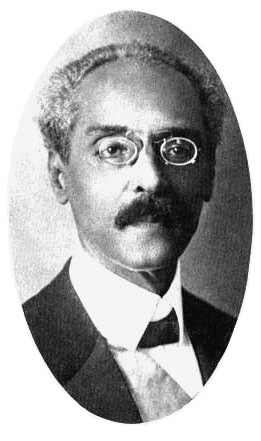

26th President of Haiti
- In office 15 May 1922 – 15 May 1930
- Preceded by: Philippe Sudré Dartiguenave
- Succeeded by: Louis Eugène Roy

Minister of Foreign Affairs, Finance and Commerce
- In office 20 June 1918 – 19 December 1918
- President: Philippe Sudré Dartiguenave
- Preceded by: Edmond Dupuy (Foreign Affairs); Edmond Héreaux (Finance and Commerce)
- Succeeded by: Constantin Benoit (Foreign Affairs); Fleury Féquière (Finance and Commerce)

Minister of Foreign Affairs, Worship and Education
- In office 9 May 1916 – 17 April 1917
- President: Philippe Sudré Dartiguenave
- Preceded by: Himself (Foreign Affairs and Public Education); Etienne Dornéval (Worship)
- Succeeded by: Furcy Châtelain (Foreign Affairs); Osmin Cham (Worship); Périclès Tessier (Public Education)

Minister of Foreign Affairs, Education and Public Works
- In office 29 January 1916 – 2 May 1916
- President: Philippe Sudré Dartiguenave
- Preceded by: Himself (Foreign Affairs and Public Education); Jean-Baptiste Dartigue (Public Works)
- Succeeded by: Himself (Foreign Affairs and Public Education); Constant Vieux (Public Works)

Minister of Foreign Affairs and Education
- In office 9 September 1915 – 29 January 1916
- President: Philippe Sudré Dartiguenave
- Preceded by: Horace Pauleus Sannon
- Succeeded by: Himself

Minister of Foreign Affairs and Justice
- In office 12 December 1914 – 16 February 1915
- President: Joseph Davilmar Théodore
- Preceded by: Justin Joseph
- Succeeded by: Joseph Cadet Jérémie

Minister of Foreign Affairs and Worship
- In office 14 March 1908 – 6 December 1908
- President: Pierre Nord Alexis
- Preceded by: Horace Pauleus Sannon
- Succeeded by: J. J. F. Magny

Personal details
- Born: Eustache Antoine Francois Joseph Louis Borno; 20 September 1865 Port-au-Prince, Haiti
- Died: 29 July 1942 (aged 76) Pétion-Ville, Haiti
- Spouse: Marie-Hélène Saint-Macary
- Children: Madeleine Brun née Borno, Henri Borno, Simone Armand née Borno
- Profession: Lawyer, journalist

Eustache Antoine François Joseph Louis Borno (French pronunciation: [østaʃ ɑ̃twan fʁɑ̃swa ʒozɛf lwi bɔʁno]; September 20, 1865 – July 29, 1942) was a lawyer and Haitian politician who served as President of Haiti from 1922 to 1930 during the period of the American occupation of Haiti (1915–34).

== Early life and education ==
Borno was of mixed race, the son of a white French father and a black Haitian mother. Encouraged by his parents, he went to Paris for his college education, earning a law degree in 1890 at the Faculty of Paris. He became part of the professional mixed-race elite in Haiti, setting up a law practice on his return.

== Nationalist minister ==
In 1899, Borno served as a diplomat in the Dominican Republic. In 1908, he served as Minister of Foreign Affairs for President Pierre Nord Alexis.

The country of Haiti was looked upon as a strategically vital location by the United States at the onset of World War I. The U.S. had extended its influence throughout the Caribbean and Latin America following the construction of the Panama Canal by invoking the Roosevelt Corollary to the Monroe Doctrine.

In 1914, the United States under President Woodrow Wilson presented a project for the control of customs and finances of Haiti, which was having increasing problems in repaying debts to the US and France. Borno, then Foreign Minister of President Joseph Davilmar Théodore, refused to cede financial control. The United States responded by confiscating the reserves of the National Bank of Haiti.

On 28 July 1915, a Haitian mob killed President Vilbrun Guillaume Sam in the legation of France, where he had taken refuge after having ordered the execution of nearly 200 political prisoners, most from the mixed-race elite. The same day, U.S. troops landed in the country, restoring order to Port-au-Prince. They organized the election of a new president, Philippe Sudré Dartiguenave, who signed the Haitian–American Convention, which allowed the United States to administer the finances of Haiti and intervene in the country whenever it deemed necessary for a period of 10 years. Borno, appointed Minister of Foreign Affairs, negotiated a U.S. commitment to the economic development of the country and refused to transfer any territory. He was briefly Minister of Finance in 1918.

Although the American occupation force handily controlled the cities, the countryside was plagued by violence carried out by "cacos", insurgents and bandits who had troubled the country since the Haitian Revolution. Embarrassed by media coverage of the war and disappointed at the ineffectiveness of the occupation, U.S. President Warren G. Harding decided in 1922 to improve the level of American administrators; he appointed as High Commissioner Major General John H. Russell, Jr.

== Cooperating President ==
When President Dartiguenave had served out his term, Louis Borno was elected by the State Council on 10 April 1922, to the surprise of the Americans. Borno, however, soon came to an agreement with Russell. He maintained a policy of "honest and frank cooperation", as Borno called it, and persuaded the Americans to help develop the country economically.

The Haitian state was deeply in debt. The external debt alone was equivalent to 4 years of the government budget. Borno decided in June 1922 to take out a loan of 23 million dollars to clear all debts. He reduced export taxes and soon the trade deficit balanced.

He achieved impressive infrastructure improvements: 1700 km of roads were made usable; 189 bridges were built; many irrigation canals were rehabilitated; hospitals, schools, and public buildings were constructed; and drinking water was brought to the main cities. Port-au-Prince became the first city of Latin America to have phone service available with automatic dialing. Agricultural education was organized with a central school of agriculture and 69 farms in the country.

Borno relied on the Catholic Church, with congregations coming from France to develop low-cost quality education throughout the country. Aware that many Haitians did not speak French, he was the first president to authorize the use of Haitian Creole in the education system.

He has been described as a "tropical fascist".

He went to the United States in 1926, where he met President Calvin Coolidge. He mainly settled old border conflicts with Dominican President Horacio Vásquez in 1929.

But Borno refused to organize free elections. He maintained a Council of State, whose 21 members he had appointed. He was re-elected by this body on 12 April 1926, which aroused opposition in the press. Borno tried to regulate it and imprisoned some journalists.

The world economic crisis that began in 1929 with the Stock Market Crash in the United States changed American policy. President Herbert Hoover sought to disengage from Haiti. He appointed a commission for this purpose, chaired by Cameron Forbes, who arrived in December 1929.

Because of the economic crisis, Haitian farmers became upset. On 6 December 1929, an excited protest faced some U.S. Marines who fired on them and perpetrated the Les Cayes massacre.

The Forbes Committee resolved to organize free elections and end the American administration, but remained pessimistic about the sustainability of democracy in Haiti. The opposition chose a provisional president, Louis Eugène Roy.

== Bibliography ==
- Philip, George D., British documents on foreign affairs: Part 2. From the First to the Second World War. Series D. Latin America, 1914–1939, Volume 7, Univ. Publ. of America, 1991, ISBN 0-89093-607-2
- Auguste Nemours A. (1926) Les Borno dans l'histoire d'Haiti, Port-au-Prince: Imprimeriee Nationale

Political offices
Preceded by Philippe Sudré Dartiguenave	President of Haïti; May 1922 – May 1930	Succeeded by Louis Eugène Roy
