= First ladies and gentlemen of Haiti =

First Lady of Haiti Première dame d'Haïti Premye dam Ayiti
- Incumbent; Vacant since 7 July 2021
- Residence: Palais National
- Inaugural holder: Suzanne Simone Baptiste Louverture
- Formation: July 7, 1801
- Website: Première Dame de la République d'Haïti

First Lady of Haiti (French: Première dame d'Haïti, Haitian Creole: Premye dam Ayiti) or First Gentleman of Haiti is the title attributed to the spouse of the president of Haiti.

== Spouses ==
Spouse (born-died)	Head of state	In office	Notes
Suzanne Simone Baptiste Louverture (around 1742–1816)	Toussaint Louverture (as Governor-General)	1797–1802	
Vacant (6 May 1802 – 1 January 1804)
Marie-Claire Heureuse Félicité (1758 – 8 August 1858)	Jean-Jacques Dessalines (as Governor-General, then Emperor)	1804–1806	as Empress of Haiti
Marie-Louise Coidavid (1778–1851)	Henri Christophe (as President, then King of North Haiti)	1807–1820	
Marie-Madeleine Lachenais (1778–1843)	Alexandre Pétion (1807–1818) and Jean-Pierre Boyer (1818–1843) (mistress, never married)	1807–1843	Marie-Madeleine Lachenais was the mistress and political advisor of both President Alexandre Sabès Pétion and President Jean-Pierre Boyer. She never married either president, but exerted political influence during their tenures.
Vacant (1843–1845)
Cecile Fatiman	Jean-Louis Pierrot	1845–1846	
Laurence Raphael	Jean-Baptiste Riché	1846–1847	
Adélina Lévêque (1820–1878)	Faustin Soulouque (President, then Emperor)	1847–1859	Empress Consort of Haiti from 1849 until 1859
Marguerite Lorvana McIntosh	Fabre Geffrard	1859–1867	
Marie-Louise Augustin Sinni	Nissage Saget (Provisional President)	1867	
Wilmina Delacourse	Sylvain Salnave	1867–1869	
Marie-Louise Augustin Sinni	Nissage Saget (President)	1869–1874	
Pauline Strattman	Michel Domingue	1874–1876	
Marie Claire Wilmina Phipps (1838–1897)	Pierre Théoma Boisrond-Canal	1877–1879	
Felicite Potiez	Lysius Salomon	1879–1888	
Marie Claire Wilmina Phipps (1838–1897)	Pierre Théoma Boisrond-Canal (Provisional President)	1888-1888	
Rose Marie Isaure Marion (1849–1929)	François Denys Légitime	1888–1889	
Adélaide Marcial	Florvil Hyppolite	1889–1896	
Constance Solomon	Tirésias Simon Sam	1896–1902	
Marie Claire Wilmina Phipps (1838–1897)	Pierre Théoma Boisrond-Canal (Provisional President)	1902	
Marie Louise Amélia Célestina Pierrot (1826–1908)	Pierre Nord Alexis	1902–1908	
Adelaïde Mentor Chéry	François C. Antoine Simon	1908–1911	
Reine-Joséphine Laroche (1849–1911)	Cincinnatus Leconte	1911–1912	
Rose Anselinette Durand (1857–1936)	Tancrède Auguste	1912–1913	
Alice Euchariste Pommeyrac (1863–1945)	Michel Oreste	1913–1914	
Véronique Péralte	Oreste Zamor	1914-1914	
Vacant (1914–1915)
Lucienne Marie Thérése Parisien (1879–?)	Vilbrun Guillaume Sam	1915-1915	
Vacant (1915–1922; "First Lady" filled by Philippe Sudré Dartiguenave's sister Gulna)
Hélène Saint-Mascary (1872–?)	Louis Borno	1922–1930	
Octavie Rigaud Roy	Louis Eugène Roy	1930-1930	
?	Sténio Vincent	1930–1941	
Georgina Saint-Aude (1892–1984)	Élie Lescot	1941–1946	
Lucienne Heurtelou (1921–2006)	Dumarsais Estimé	1946–1950	
Yolette Leconte (1918–1981)	Paul Magloire	December 6, 1950 – December 12, 1956	
Lucia Pierre-Louis (acting)	Joseph Nemours Pierre-Louis (acting)	December 12, 1956 – February 3, 1957	Provisional President Joseph Nemours Pierre-Louis was unmarried during his presidency. He appointed his older sister, Lucia Pierre-Louis, to be First Lady of Haiti and official hostess.
Dieudonne Auxilus Occide Jeanty	Franck Sylvain	February 7, 1957 – April 2, 1957	
Carmen Jean-François	Daniel Fignolé	May 25, 1957 – May 25, 1957	
Marie Yvonne Charles Kébreau	Antonio Thrasybule Kébreau	June 14, 1957 – October 22, 1957	
Simone Duvalier (1913–1997)	François Duvalier	October 22, 1957 – April 21, 1971	
Michèle Bennett (1950–present)	Jean-Claude Duvalier	1971–1986	
Gisèle Célestin Namphy	Henri Namphy	1986–1988	
Mirlande Manigat (1940–present)	Leslie Manigat	1988-1988	
Gisèle Célestin Namphy	Henri Namphy	1988-1988	
Marie-Ange Nazon Avril	Prosper Avril	1988–1990	
Maryse Armand Abraham	Hérard Abraham	1990-1990	
Ernst Trouillot	Ertha Pascal-Trouillot (acting)	1990–1991	To date, Ernst Trouillot is the only man to hold the position, while Pascal-Trouillot is the only woman to hold the presidency.
Vacant	Jean-Bertrand Aristide	February 7, 1991 – September 29, 1991	Aristide, a Roman Catholic priest until 1994, was unmarried
Yannick Prosper	Raoul Cédras	September 30, 1991 – October 8, 1991	Raoul Cédras remained the de facto ruler of Haiti from 1991 until October 1994
Guerda Jean-Baptiste Nérette	Joseph Nérette (provisional president)	October 8, 1991 – June 19, 1992	
Marie-Yolaine Sam Bazin	Marc Bazin (provisional president)	June 19, 1992 – August 30, 1993	
Marie-Thérèse Jonassaint	Émile Jonassaint (provisional president)	June 15, 1993 – October 12, 1994	
Vacant	Jean-Bertrand Aristide	October 12, 1994 – January 20, 1996	Aristide, who left the Catholic priesthood in 1994, was unmarried until 1996
Mildred Trouillot (1963–present)	Jean-Bertrand Aristide	January 20, 1996 – February 7, 1996	President Aristide married Trouillot, a Haitian American, on January 20, 1996
Guerda Benoît (1963–present)	René Préval	February 7, 1996 – February 4, 2001	President Préval married his second wife, Géri Benoît, sometime during his first term in a small ceremony at the National Palace.
Mildred Trouillot (1963–present)	Jean-Bertrand Aristide	February 4, 2001 – February 29, 2004	
Célima Dorcély Alexandre	Boniface Alexandre	February 29, 2004 – May 14, 2006	
Vacant	René Préval	May 14, 2006 – December 6, 2009	President Préval was divorced from the time he took office in 2006 until his marriage to his third wife on December 6, 2009.
Elisabeth Delatour Préval (1962–present)	René Préval	December 6, 2009 – May 14, 2011	President Préval married Elisabeth Delatour Préval on December 6, 2009, while in office.
Sophia Martelly	Michel Martelly	May 14, 2011 – February 7, 2016	
Ginette Michaud Privert	Jocelerme Privert (interim president)	February 14, 2016 – February 7, 2017	
Martine Moïse	Jovenel Moïse	February 7, 2017 – July 7, 2021	
Vacant (July 7, 2021 – ; Transitional Presidential Council)
