= Célima Dorcély Alexandre =

First Lady of Haiti (1936–2020)

First Lady of Haiti
- In role February 29, 2004 – May 14, 2006
- President: Boniface Alexandre
- Preceded by: Mildred Trouillot
- Succeeded by: Elisabeth Delatour Préval (2009)

Personal details
- Born: Célima Dorcély; October 26, 1936 Ganthier, Ouest department, Haiti
- Died: August 11, 2020 (aged 83) Delmas, Port-au-Prince Arrondissement, Haiti
- Spouse: Boniface Alexandre (m. 1990)
- Children: Four

Célima Dorcély Alexandre (October 26, 1936 – August 11, 2020) was a former First Lady of Haiti, a position she held from February 29, 2004, until May 14, 2006. Dorcély assumed the role when her husband, then-Supreme Court Chief Justice Boniface Alexandre, became interim President of Haiti following the 2004 Haitian coup d'état which overthrew Jean-Bertrand Aristide.

== Biography ==
Dorcély was born on October 26, 1936, and raised in Ganthier, Ouest department. In 1952, she met Boniface Alexandre at her cousin's house on the Rue des Fronts-Forts in Ganthiers. The couple quickly began dating. They eventually moved in together and had four children over the next several decades – Jean Bony, Schiller, Berwick and Marjorie. However, Dorcély and Alexandre chose not to officially marry until 1990, when they wed in a religious ceremony.

During her tenure as First Lady, Célima Dorcély Alexandre oversaw the construction of a chapel in Thomazeau, which she dedicated to Our Mother of Perpetual Help, the patron saint of Haiti. Dorcély also headed the Haitian government delegation to the XXIII Conference of First Ladies, Wives and Representatives of Heads of State and Government of the Americas, which was held in Paraguay from September 28–30, 2005. It was her only foreign trip in her official capacity as Haitian first lady.

Jean Robert Hérard, a writer and historian of Haitian first ladies, noted that neither First Lady Célima Dorcély Alexandre nor President Alexandre had any public financial scandals while in office, a noteworthy exception for presidential couples in modern Haitian politics. In his book, "Les Premiers dames de la République d'Haïti (1957-2019)", Hérard credited Dorcély's background and "humility" for the lack of public scandals and mismanagement during their tenures.

Célima Dorcély Alexandre died from complications of a stroke on August 11, 2020, at the Hospital Bernard Mevs in Delmas, near Port-au-Prince. She was survived by her husband, former President Boniface Alexandre, their four children, their grandchildren, and her three brothers - Etécier Dorcely, Jolimeau Dorcely and Robert Dorcely.

Dorcély's funeral was held at the Saint-Pierre de Pétion-Ville Catholic Church in Pétion-Ville on August 22, 2020. She was buried in her home commune of Ganthier the same day.
