= Executive Government Council (Haiti) =

The Executive Government Council (French: Conseil Exécutif Gouvernement; CEG) was a provisional collegial governing body in Haiti created during the politically turbulent years of 1956-1957. Its establishment, facilitated by the military, was in response to the failure of the two preceding interim presidents, Joseph Nemours Pierre-Louis and Franck Sylvain, to resolve widespread unrest following the resignation and departure of Paul Magloire. Its primary objectives were to restore stability and prepare Haiti for a national election. It governed Haiti from April 5/April 6, 1957, to May 21, 1957.

Thirteen representatives formed the council, representing the six principal presidential candidates, including François Duvalier, Daniel Fignolé, and Louis Déjoie. These members served as the country's secretaries and undersecretaries of state. Leadership of the council rotated among the secretaries of state.

Throughout its existence, François Duvalier repeatedly sabotaged the council's work, primarily because he saw it as a tool for his rivals. The imbalance in representatives (both Fignolé and Déjoie had four representatives each, while Duvalier only had three) was the cause for this belief.

Finally, when the council attempted to remove General Léon Cantave as Chief of Staff and appoint Colonel Pierre Armand in his stead, the military high command decided to dissolve the council entirely.

== Background ==
=== Nemours Pierre-Louis Government (December 12, 1956 - February 3, 1957) ===
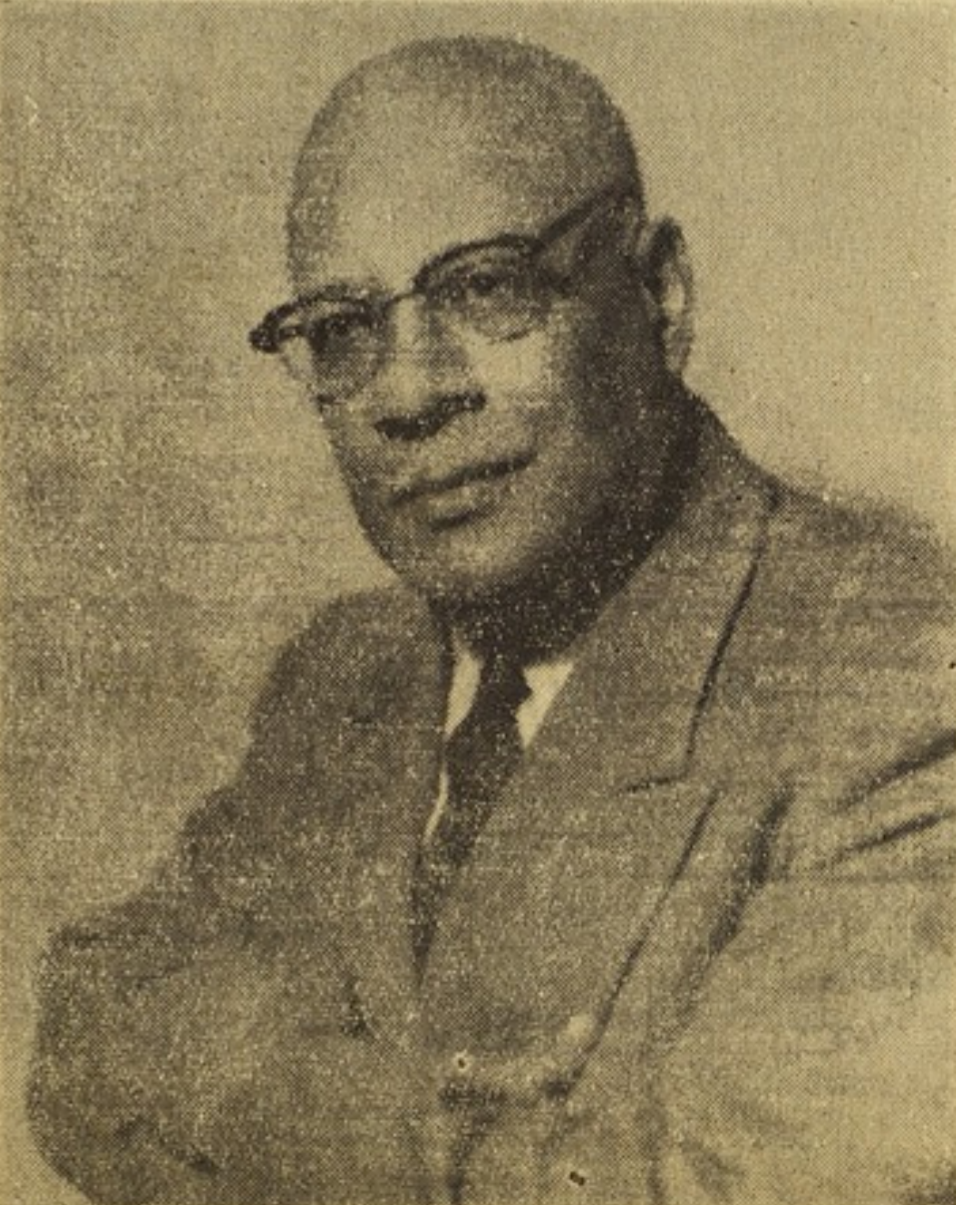
President Joseph Nemours Pierre-Louis.

Following Magloire's departure, Nemours Pierre-Louis, president of the Court of Cassation/Supreme Court, became provisional president by virtue of Article 81 of the 1950 Constitution; this article states that should the presidency be vacant, a replacement would be drawn from the Supreme Court justices. Louis was sworn in on December 12, 1956. Meanwhile, Colonel Léon Cantave, who had been seeking refuge in an embassy in fear of retribution from Magloire, arbitrarily took over command of the Haitian army, claiming the titles "General" and "Chief of Staff".

Nemours proposed an investigate commission into the actions of his predecessor. However, this was still seen as insufficient by many who wanted a more aggressive and decisive investigation. His perceived leniency alienated both the public and his ministers, with several resigning in protest against his lack of action and decisiveness.

After a brief period of calm following Magloire's departure, protests resumed due to discontent with Nemours' leadership. Ultimately, Nemours tended his resignation on February 3, 1957, after just 53 days in power.

=== Franck Sylvain Government (February 7, 1957 - April 2, 1957) ===
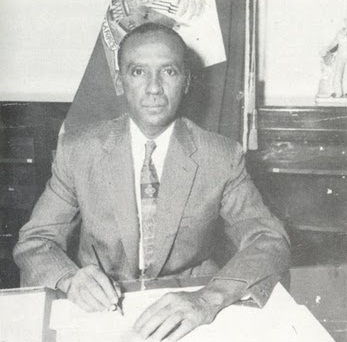
President Franck Sylvain.

Franck Sylvain, initially a presidential candidate, was chosen by parliament to serve as provisional president on February 7. His selection was largely influenced by Daniel Fignolé, who pressured the assembly to support Sylvain. He was sworn in immediately with a mandate set to conclude on May 15. Sylvain's election rescinded the constitutional provisions for presidential succession.

The new provisional president aimed to organize elections before the end of his mandate, deciding to begin voter registration on March 24.

Sylvain's government was mired in allegations of partisanship and favoritism towards François Duvalier. Accusations of Duvalier influencing his appointments created distrust and opposition to his leadership. These suspicions were confirmed when Sylvain ordered the arrests of presidential candidates Jumelle and Fignolé and manipulated voter registration in the provinces to set up an electoral system deliberately designed to secure a victory for Duvalier.

On April 1, a strike organized by Daniel Fignolé and Louis Déjoie made Port-au-Prince come to a complete standstill. The following day, authorities discovered a stash of homemade bombs and molotov cocktails. Sylvain, along with other Duvalierists, were implicated. The scandal led to General Léon Cantave orchestrating a coup against Sylvain, placing him under house arrest and effectively ending his provisional presidency that lasted less than two months.

== History ==
After Franck Sylvain was removed from power, General Léon Cantave briefly assumed control of the government; rather than seizing leadership for himself, Cantave convened the presidential candidates and their representatives to devise a new framework of governance. This assembly, known as the "Revolutionary Assembly", agreed upon a provisional governing body named the "Government Executive Council" (CEG). The CEG was to restore stability and prepare Haiti for a national election.

The council consisted of 13 individuals, nominated by the candidates themselves; the principal presidential candidates included François Duvalier, Daniel Fignolé, and Louis Déjoie. These members served as the country's secretaries and undersecretaries of state. Leadership of the council rotated among the secretaries of state.

The council faced immediate criticism; François Duvalier accused the council of being a tool for his rivals, Louis Déjoie and Daniel Fignolé. This was because the latter each had four representatives, while he only had three.

When Duvalierist candidate Edmond Pierre-Paul was overlooked for the position of Government Commissioner in favor of Déjoie supporter Ernest Sabalat, Duvalier withdrew his representatives in protest and accused the other candidates of plotting against him.

Duvalier escalated tensions further by delivering a provocative radio speech accusing his opponents of madness and imploring his supporters to remain strong. His incendiary rhetoric reignited public disorder in the cities and weakened the influence of the CEG.

In an attempt to restore order, the council banned political gatherings and radio broadcasts; it set the election date for June 16. Duvalierist propagandists framed these measures as a coup designed to bring about the election of Fignolé.

By May, Haiti was on the brink of anarchy, with widespread violence and unrest; both the national bank and legislature closed down in protest of the CEG's handling of affairs.

On May 21, the army decided to dissolve the CEG after it attempted to remove General Cantave and replace him with Colonel Pierre Armand. Furthermore, the council was charged with rigging elections in favor of Louis Dejoie and/or Daniel Fignole, who controlled the council.

A brief power struggle ensued within the military between the Cantave and Armand camps, culminating on May 25 with a fierce day-long battle in Casernes Dessalines. Ultimately, Cantave and Armand were both compelled to resign, and General Antonio Thrasybule Kébreau, secretly aligned with Duvalier, became the new army chief.

== Bibliography ==
- Smith, Matthew (2009). Red Black in Haiti Radicalism, Conflict, and Political Change, 1934-1957. University of North Carolina Press. ISBN 978-0807832653.
