= Operation Secure Tomorrow =

2004 American military operation in Haiti

- Part of the 2004 Haitian coup d'état
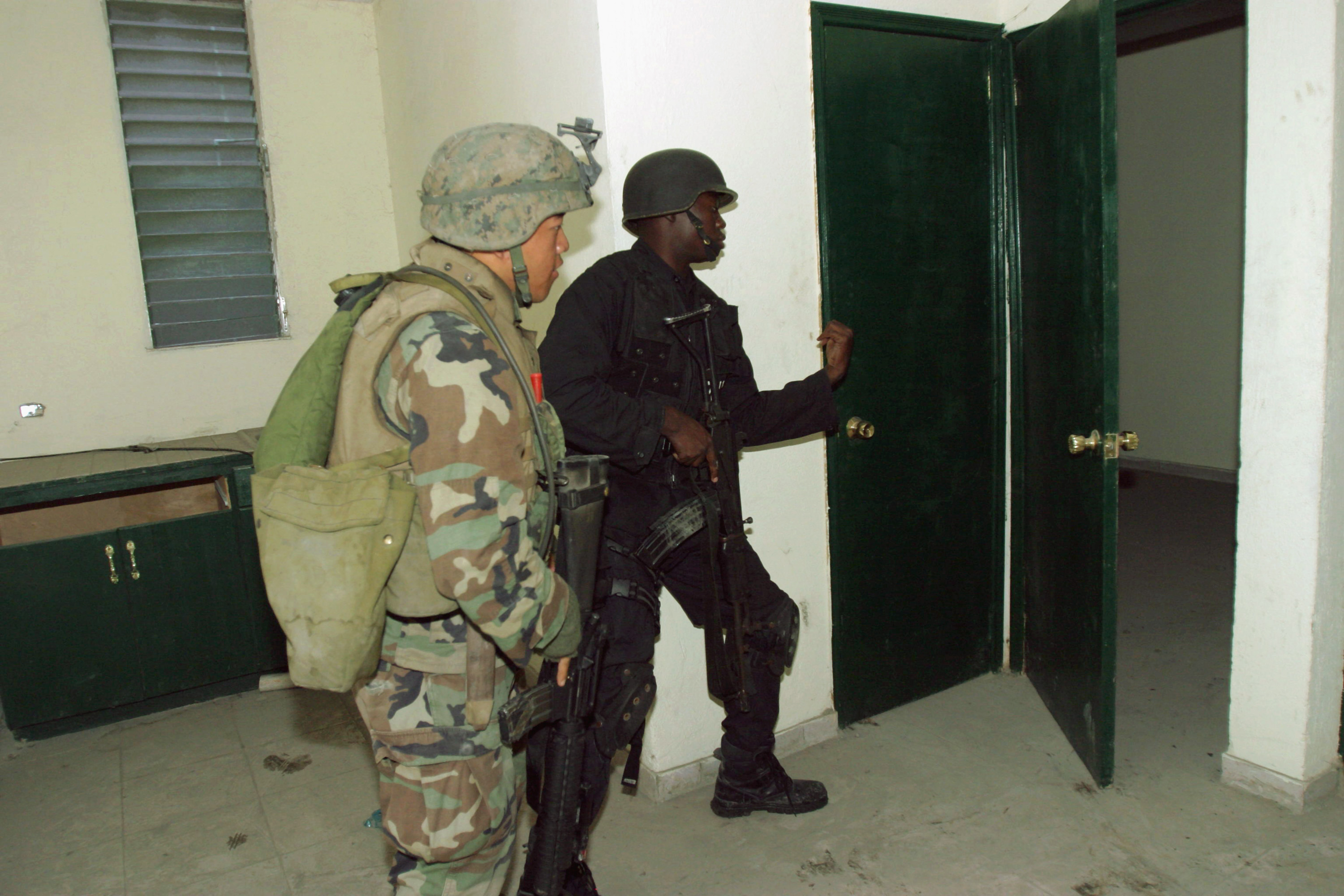
- A United States Marine and a Haitian National Police Intervention Group officer raid an apartment complex in Port-au-Prince, 14 April 2004
Date	29 February 2004 – 25 June 2004 (3 months, 3 weeks and 6 days)
Location	Haiti
Result	State collapse prevented, operation succeeded by the United Nations Stabilisation Mission in Haiti

Belligerents
United States; France; Canada; Chile; Haiti	(Haiti) Various gangs and militias

Commanders and leaders
(United States) George W. Bush; (United States) James T. Hill; (United States) Ronald S. Coleman; (United States) David H. Berger; (Haiti) Boniface Alexandre; (Haiti) Gérard Latortue; (Haiti) Léon Charles	(Haiti) Louis-Jodel Chamblain (surrendered) (Haiti) Guy Philippe (surrendered)

Strength
(United States) 2,000 troops; (France) 900+ troops; (Canada) 530 troops; (Chile) 340 troops; (Haiti) 2,500 police officers	Unknown

Casualties and losses
- At least 1–6 Haitians killed

Operation Secure Tomorrow was a military operation led by the United States that took place in Haiti from 29 February to 25 June 2004. After an armed rebellion broke out in early February 2004, and Haitian president Jean-Bertrand Aristide resigned on 29 February under pressure from the George W. Bush administration, the United States deployed military forces to stabilize the country and prevent a total state collapse. The US-led Multinational Interim Force (MIF) was also joined by troops from Canada, France, and Chile. The deployment was in accordance with United Nations Security Council Resolution 1529, which was passed after a request for assistance from Haitian interim president Boniface Alexandre.

US, Canadian, and French troops began arriving on the evening of 29 February and securing the Toussaint Louverture International Airport, which became their headquarters. By late April 2004, the American contingent of the Multinational Interim Force consisted of 2,000 personnel, which mainly came from the 3rd Battalion, 8th Marines. They were present along with over 900 French, 500 Canadian, and 300 Chilean troops. The majority of the force was deployed in Port-au-Prince and surrounding areas, which were initially the only part of the country that was controlled by the Haitian transitional government. French troops began operating in Cap-Haïtien and expanded across northern Haiti from mid-March. In April the American contingent sent troops to Les Cayes in the south, and to Hinche in the center department with the Chilean contingent. By late May 2004, the MIF had units deployed in every region of the country.

The presence of the Multinational Interim Force improved security, but the country remained volatile, and many armed gangs and militias were still present. The MIF and the Haitian National Police (PNH) coordinated and conducted joint patrols, gradually expanding their presence, and made an effort to confiscate unauthorized firearms from the population. They made agreements with local armed groups in some areas to reduce violence. On 3 May, the Haitian government lifted the curfew imposed at the start of the operation. Despite the stabilization of the political situation in Haiti and the surrender of some armed group members, crime remained high. The country had a shortage of police officers and a largely non-functional court system. The operation was completed during the month of June, which was when the MIF transferred authority to the United Nations Stabilisation Mission in Haiti for continuing the mission of assisting Haiti's government. US and French troops competed their withdrawal by 30 June, and that was followed by the withdrawal of Canadian troops on 2 August. Chilean troops remained in Haiti as UN peacekeepers.

== Background ==
US marines arriving Haiti aboard an Air Force Boeing C-17 Globemaster III, on 4 March 2004

An armed rebellion against Haitian president Jean-Bertrand Aristide began in early February 2004 in Gonaïves. The rebels took over much of northern Haiti and threatened to take the capital. On 23 February, United States president George W. Bush deployed about fifty United States Marine Corps personnel to protect to the US embassy in Port-au-Prince. On 29 February, Aristide announced his resignation and left the country under pressure from the Bush administration. Haitian Supreme Court president Boniface Alexandre took office just after the resignation, in accordance with the constitution of Haiti.

Alexandre, as the interim president, requested help from foreign governments, including troops, "for the purpose of conducting activities designed to bring about a climate of security and stability which will support the political processes underway, facilitate the furnishing of humanitarian assistance, and in general help the people of Haiti." His request was submitted to the United Nations Security Council on the evening of 29 February by Haiti's permanent representative, and the council granted the request by passing Resolution 1529. The Multinational Interim Force began to deploy immediately.

Instability had started increasing in Haiti during late 2003, when the Haitian National Police (PNH) and pro-Aristide gangs suppressed college student protests. The rebellion in February 2004 caused "the near collapse of the entire security apparatus." The parliament of Haiti had ceased to function in January 2004, when the terms of the National Assembly and over half of the Senate expired. In consultation with the international community, in March 2004 the Haitian transitional government—which included representatives of Haiti's human rights groups, the Catholic and Anglican churches, the private sector, academia, and the parties Convergence Démocratique and Fanmi Lavalas—selected a new prime minister, Gérard Latortue, who appointed a 13-member cabinet.

The transitional government and other groups signed a political pact that pledged to hold elections in 2005, inaugurate an elected president in 2006, and engage with the United Nations on the MIF and future peacekeeping operations. Aristide's party Fanmi Lavalas was an exception, and it denounced the pact. The transitional government was faced with the task of extending state authority beyond Port-au-Prince, where it was nonexistent in many areas, and rebuilding the Haitian National Police. Insurgents whose ranks included former soldiers, street gangs, local militias, and prison escapees were in control of areas outside of the capital city, which was the only part of Haiti controlled by the transitional government.

== Operation ==
=== Initial deployment ===
Brig. Gen. Ronald Coleman greeted by Col. Mark Gurganus upon arrival at Toussaint Louverture International Airport, Port-au-Prince, on 12 March 2004

On the day of Aristide's resignation, Bush ordered the deployment of US marines. That evening a group of 30 Canadian special forces, followed by around 100 US marines, arrived in Port-au-Prince and took up defensive positions around Toussaint Louverture International Airport. US and French officers worked to coordinate the arrival of additional forces beginning from 1 March. Their objective was to secure the capital, facilitate the delivery of aid, protect US citizens, repatriate Haitian migrants attempting to reach the United States, and prepare for the Multinational Interim Force's deployment.

Just after Aristide left the country, a United States Coast Guard captain in Haiti organized a group of 20–30 Haitian Coast Guardsmen and sent them to the National Palace on two helicopters, where they protected the palace from crowds of looters. The USCG had spent almost a decade assisting the Haitian Coast Guard, and it continued to function during the political unrest. Looting and rioting occurred in Port-au-Prince on 29 February, mostly on the outskirts, before the crowds were dispersed by Haitian police. Over 3,000 inmates at the National Penitentiary were released. Around that time, the USCG also worked with its Haitian counterpart to repatriate over 900 Haitian migrants that had been picked up from boats by Coast Guard cutters on 25–26 February.

On 3 March, Amnesty International called on the Multinational Interim Force to bring to the Haitian justice system rebel leaders, notably Louis-Jodel Chamblain, and other known human rights violators, including some that escaped from the National Penitentiary. Léon Charles was appointed as the new director-general of the Haitian National Police by the transitional government, and US marines took control of the National Penitentiary. Charles said that the PNH would take a neutral approach and show impartiality during the mission, also in an effort to restore confidence in the organization among Haitians.

The American contingent, with a Marine Air–Ground Task Force at its core, was initially commanded by USMC Colonel Mark Gurganus and had its headquarters at Toussaint Louverture International Airport. USMC Brigadier General Ronald S. Coleman, commanding general of the 2nd Force Service Support Group, assumed command of the newly formed Combined Joint Task Force-Haiti on 15 March. Around that time, the task force had a strength of about 2,700, including 1,700 Americans and 1,000 French, Canadian, and Chilean personnel. The American contingent consisted of a Fleet Anti-terrorism Support Team under the US Southern Command, which had been deployed on 23 February, and the 3rd Battalion, 8th Marines, led by Lieutenant Colonel David H. Berger. There were Haitian-American marines among them who provided assistance with local contacts, cultural awareness, and language skills. The Canadian contingent consisted of a Theater Activation Team under Lieutenant Colonel M. R. Voith, and the main task force under Lieutenant Colonel J. P. Davis, which included a company from the 2nd Battalion, Royal Canadian Regiment; helicopters from 430 Tactical Helicopter Squadron; and command and support elements.

There were also US Navy corpsmen with the marines, and later an Army psychological operations battalion was deployed. Air Force and Coast Guard personnel also participated, with Coast Guard ships patrolling around Haiti. On 24 March, the US Southern Command announced that the name of the deployment is Operation Secure Tomorrow. The Canadian Forces called their contribution Operation Halo.

=== Main actions ===
Marines from 3rd Battalion, 8th Marines, securing a Haitian police station in Delmas, Port-au-Prince, on 6 March 2004

The 3rd Battalion, which had been scheduled to deploy for the Iraq War in the summer of 2004, was sent to Port-au-Prince and surrounding areas. In early March 2004, in coordination with PNH director-general Léon Charles, US marines from 3rd Battalion deployed to Haitian police stations in Port-au-Prince as part of an effort to secure key locations in the capital. Charles worked to reorganize the police, which had collapsed during the rebel advance. On 10 March, US Southern Command commander Army General James T. Hill authorized the Multinational Interim Force to assist the PNH with collecting illegal weapons among the Haitian population. During March, US marines established checkpoints throughout the capital and searched vehicles for illegal weapons after a 10 pm curfew. They occasionally received gunfire, and one marine was reported injured. Marines fired on vehicles in response, and reported deaths among Haitians ranged from one to six.

The confrontations with marines in Port-au-Prince caused public concern about unwarranted shootings. Based on the work of the MIF Haitian Creole linguist team, and a Haitian-American marine advisor, Coleman made the decision to appear on several Haitian radio stations to allay people's concerns. Radio was the main source of information among Haitians, and the general gave several interviews to explain the purpose and procedures of the checkpoints. He also answered questions from city residents on a live radio show. Tensions calmed down shortly after Coleman's radio appearances. Marines were also deployed to the National Palace and the prime minister's residence.

Aristide and Fanmi Lavalas still had significant support, particularly in Port-au-Prince. On 21 March, Haitian police officers executed five young men who were pro-Aristide militants. The policemen responsible were suspended by the PNH's Office of the Inspector General. The PNH had a reputation for being unprofessional and politicized, and police officers became targets for violence and retaliation. In northern Haiti, the PNH had been reduced to 50 officers, and rebel groups such as the "Armed Forces of the North" and the "Kosovo Army" remained active outside of Cap-Haïtien, including near the border with the Dominican Republic. They detained Haitian journalists and government officials. French troops were deployed to patrol the city of Cap-Haïtien. As of 23 March, the size of the Multinational Interim Force increased to 3,300, including 1,800 American, 760 French, 330 Chilean and 340 Canadian troops. Under Coleman's command, the troops were confiscating illegal weapons, which were widespread in Haiti. From mid-March, the Multinational Interim Force, the majority of which was deployed in Port-au-Prince, established a presence in the northern Haitian cities of Gonaïves, Cap Haïtien, and Fort Liberté. Troops occasionally conducted ground and air patrols of other areas, sometimes with the PNH.

A Haitian police officer and American marines examine a map of police stations in Port-au-Prince, on 6 March 2004

As of early April, Amnesty International reported that both rebels and pro-Aristide militias (known as chimères) remained active, in addition to non-political gangs, despite the presence of the MIF. Former soldiers also emerged as leaders in areas where state authority was absent. That month, marines from the 3rd Battalion and soldiers from a US Army psychological operations battalion participated in raids alongside Haitian National Police Intervention Group (SWAT) officers to seize weapons in Port-au-Prince. During April, the MIF expanded to about 2,000 American service members, over 900 French, over 500 Canadian, and over 300 Chilean. Police officers began to return to their duties. The PNH, which consisted of 2,300 officers, on 20 April began a recruitment drive to recruit more policemen. French troops expanded their security zone in northern Haiti beyond Cap-Haïtien, while the American contingent expanded to Les Cayes in the south and Hinche in the central plateau department.

Armed groups continued to control some areas and wield influence elsewhere. In some cases, the MIF and PNH made arrangements to coexist with gangs and militias. The French contingent stabilized Cap-Haïtien after weeks of negotiations with the group "Armed Forces of the North." On 7 April, in St. Marc, another group prevented the installation of a new government official without being consulted first. A similar incident happened on 19 April in Jacmel. On 18 April, the commander of the Chilean contingent and the PNH director-general sought approval from a rebel leader to deploy their forces in the central department. The MIF's presence improved the security situation. The roads connecting Port-au-Prince to Gonaïves, Bombardopolis, Môle Saint Nicolas, Port-de-Paix were relatively secure and returned to normality, though some parts of the Nord-Oest department still had no police presence, including Bombardopolis, Môle Saint Nicolas, Jean-Rabel, and Baie-de-Henne. Louis-Jodel Chamblain surrendered himself to the Haitian transitional government on 23 April.

The situation in the country was still volatile, and tens of thousands of illegal sidearms, semi-automatic and automatic rifles were in circulation. The MIF began preparations to transfer its role to the United Nations Stabilisation Mission in Haiti (MINUSTAH). Weapon collection and surrender of armed groups continued; former rebel leader Guy Philippe gave up his weapons on 29 April. On 30 April, MINUSTAH was formally established by UNSC Resolution 1542, and was scheduled to take over from the MIF on 1 June. It had the mandate of assisting the Haitian transitional government in restoring democratic and constitutional governance, disarming the population, and professionalizing the Haitian National Police.

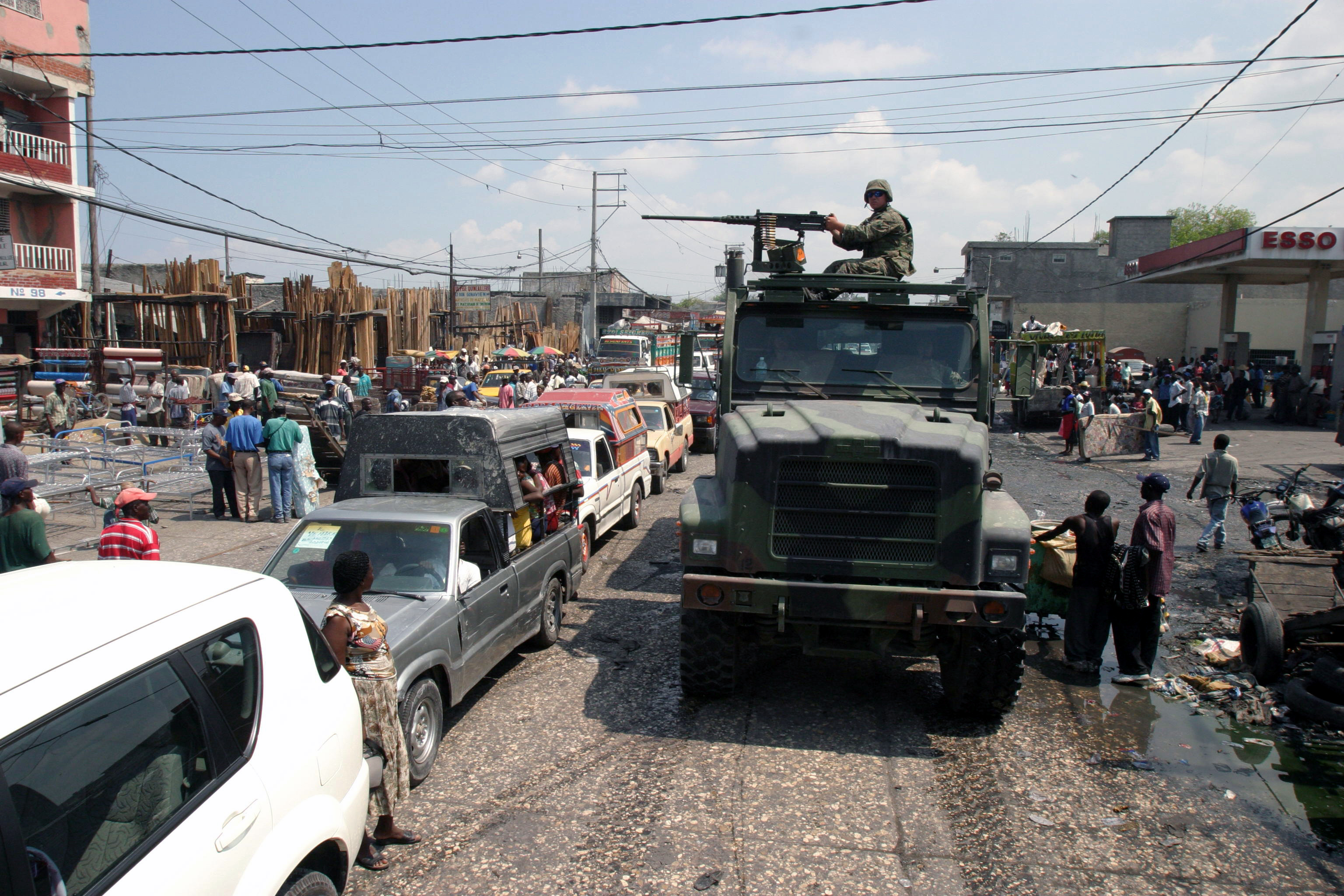
An Oshkosh vehicle of Kilo Company, 3rd Battalion, 8th Marines, in Port-au-Prince on 5 April 2004

On 3 May, the authorities lifted the curfew imposed earlier. However, crime remained high, and gang activity disrupted life in central Port-au-Prince. The shortage of police officers and lack of functional government institutions also remained a problem. The MIF organized a street sweeping program in the Bel Air and Cité Soleil neighborhoods of Port-au-Prince to assist the Ministry of Public Works in cleaning up the thousands of tons of garbage being thrown into the streets.

As of 13 May, the Organization of American States reported that stabilization in Haiti was making gradual progress as the MIF and the PNH expanded their presence, but crime was increasing, and both forces were perceived as being unable to guarantee security. The reopening of police stations and courthouses across Haiti was delayed, and the ones that were working experienced overcrowding. The PNH did not know how many functioning police stations it had. The judicial system remained largely non-operational despite some judicial appointments. The PNH's recruitment effort resulted in 35,000 applicants to the National Police Academy, which intended to accept from 800 to 1,200. Former members of the military distanced themselves from other armed groups. Some ex-soldiers applied to the academy, and some provincial police stations were manned by them.

As of 30 May 2004, the MIF was deployed as follows. The area of responsibility of the American contingent was northern Port-au-Prince, Hinche, and Les Cayes, with two permanent units in Les Cayes in addition to the troops in Port-au-Prince, and one unit temporarily in Jacmel. The Chilean contingent was responsible for the southeast of Port-au-Prince, including the Pétionville neighborhood and Hinche, having one permanent unit in the latter. The French contingent's area consisted of four departments in the north: Artibonite, Nord-Ouest, Nord, and Nord-Est. One French company was in Cap-Haïtien, and smaller detachments were in Port de Paix, Fort Liberté, St. Marc, and Gonaïves. The Canadian contingent was responsible for the southwest of Port-au-Prince, up to Miragoâne. It had a unit in Petit-Goâve, and a quick reaction force in Carrefour, southern Port-au-Prince. The size of the PNH had increased to 2,500 officers, with an average of 70% being on duty at any given time. The MIF supported reliable elements of the police, but "quite a few" had ties to gangs. The PNH also had a shortage of equipment and weapons.

== Aftermath ==
The MIF began concentrating its contingents in one or two locations per sector leading up to the transition. On 1 June 2004, the peacekeeping mission was symbolically passed from the Multinational Interim Force to MINUSTAH, with a ceremony at the National Police Academy in Port-au-Prince involving Brazilian Army Lieutenant General Augusto Heleno Ribeiro Pereira, the first UN commander. However, only a small portion of the UN contingent had arrived by then, and a formal change of command ceremony was scheduled for the end of the month, when most of the MIF personnel left and more UN troops arrived. Haitian interim president Alexandre and prime minister Latortue were also in attendance. Latortue wanted the US to extend its military presence, saying that only they had a "dissuasive effect" in Haiti.

The MIF was authorized by the UN Security Council to remain in the country for no longer than a transition period of 30 days after the formal establishment of MIUNSTAH on 1 June. Chilean troops were reassigned as members of MINUSTAH. The US, French, and Canadian contingents continued to have responsibility for security during the transition period. Another ceremony took place at the National Police Academy on 25 June, in which the US-led MIF gave authority to MINUSTAH. The 340 Chilean and 530 Canadian MIF personnel were transferred to UN command, which at that time included 1,200 Brazilian troops. The US announced that most American service members would leave by 29 June, except four officers working with the UN. French and US troops completed their withdrawal by 30 June. Canadian troops remained to provide assistance as MINUSTAH personnel until 31 July, and the main force of the Canadian contingent withdrew on 2 August.

== Assessment ==
In late May 2004, the Group of 184 (G184), whose membership included Haitian private and civil society organizations, trade unions, student groups, and women's organizations, and which led the protests against Aristide, criticized the Haitian transitional government. The group said that it was too slow to disarm the gangs, reestablish law and order, and deal with increasing prices of electricity, water, and sanitation. The government's task of confiscating unauthorized weapons was made more difficult by the fact that the rebels had seized police uniforms, equipment, and weapons during the rebellion in February 2004, and in the north they dressed in PNH uniforms while replacing the actual police in their job. There was stability in Port-au-Prince during the transition period in June, though security deteriorated in Gonaïves, where the police was unable to control the situation.

During the operation, the authorities did not catch all of the inmates that had escaped from prison in February 2004. Human Rights Watch wrote that during the year 2004, the Haitian transitional government failed to establish its authority or rule of law in much of the country, and that with a small, poorly-trained, and demoralized police force, it had to rely on foreign peacekeepers. The PNH was responsible for illegal arrests and extrajudicial executions while responding to increasing crime. Meanwhile, many serious crimes continued to go unpunished. As of August 2005, neither the PNH nor any of the peacekeeping forces had arrested many of the rebels that had overthrown the Aristide government. They continued to control some government buildings in northern Haiti.

== Sources ==
- Carey, Henry F. (2005). "The Third U.S. Intervention and Haiti's Paramilitary Predicament". Journal of Haitian Studies. 11 (1): 88–111. JSTOR 41715292.
- Kovats-Bernat, J. Christopher (2006). "Factional Terror, Paramilitarism and Civil War in Haiti: The View from Port-Au-Prince, 1994-2004". Anthropologica. 48 (1): 117–39. doi:10.2307/25605301. JSTOR 25605301.

== See also ==
- 2004 Haitian coup d'état
- United Nations Stabilization Mission in Haiti
