= 1529 (disambiguation) =

1529 may refer to:

- AD 1529 (1529 CE), the year MDXXIX of the Gregorian calendar
- 1529 BC (1529 BCE), a year from the Gregorian calendar system

== Places ==
- 1529 Oterma, a main-belt asteroid, the 1529th asteroid registered
- Farm to Market Road 1529, Texas, USA

== Other uses ==
- No. 1529 (Beam Approach Training) Flight RAF, a unit of the British Royal Air Force
- United Nations Security Council Resolution 1529 (2004) on the Haitian coup against President Aristide
- U.S. federal House Resolution 1529, Second Chance for Ex-Offenders Act of 2009

== See also ==
- 10.1529 DOI prefix
