= Louis-Auguste Boisrond-Canal =

Haitian politician and senator

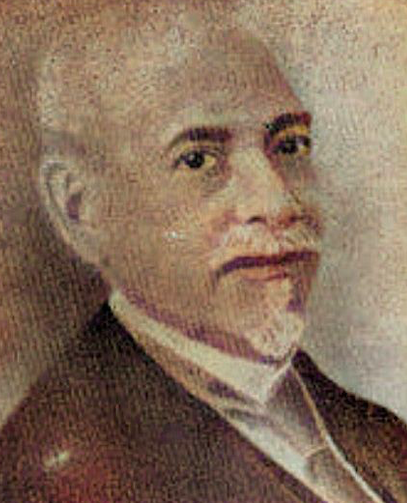

Provisional President of Haiti
- In office December 2, 1908 – December 6, 1908
- Preceded by: Pierre Nord Alexis
- Succeeded by: François C. Antoine Simon

Personal details
- Party: Liberal Party

Louis-Auguste Boisrond-Canal (1847–1940) better known as Boisrond-Canal Jeune or Ti Canal, was a Haitian politician and senator, younger brother of President Pierre Théoma Boisrond-Canal. He was a member of the Commission for Public Order, which governed Haiti from December 2 to December 6, 1908.

In January 1908, Nord Alexis declared himself president for life. This announcement united Anténor Firmin's supporters to launch a new revolt against Alexis. Although the Firminist uprising was crushed, the government's neglect of the southern region started a new rebellion led by Antoine Simon. Faced with the progress of the southern revolution, Canal deposed Alexis in a coup d'état on December 2. Canal formed a commission and provided diplomatic assistance for Alexis' departure. In a statement, the newly formed Commission for Public Order would be active until the arrival of the Southern Revolutionary Army and urged the Haitian people to remain calm. In addition to Canal, the commission was composed of generals Prudent and Grandjean Guillaume and liberals Maximilien Laforest, Michel Oreste and Auguste Bonamy. However, violence and pillage ensued, Canal then commissioned General Poitevien to suppress civil disorder, an effective measure but the riots would only end with the transfer of power to Antoine Simon on December 6. Canal was appointed Minister of Public Works and Agriculture by the new government, a position he held from 1908 to 1909.
