= Léon Cantave =

Haitian general (1910–1967)

Acting President of Haiti
- In office April 2, 1957 – April 6, 1957
- Preceded by: Franck Sylvain
- Succeeded by: Executive Government Council
- In office May 20, 1957 – May 25, 1957
- Preceded by: Executive Government Council
- Succeeded by: Daniel Fignolé

Chief of the General Staff of the Army
- In office December 13, 1956 – May 26, 1957
- President: Nemours Pierre-Louis; Franck Sylvain
- Preceded by: Antoine Levelt
- Succeeded by: Antonio Thrasybule Kébreau

Personal details
- Born: July 4, 1910 Mirebalais, Haiti
- Died: February 16, 1967 (aged 56) Paris, France
- Profession: Military

Léon Cantave (French pronunciation: [leɔ̃ kɑ̃tav]; July 4, 1910 – February 16, 1967) was a Haitian general who served as Army Chief of Staff (1956-1957), playing an important role in the political events of 1957.

== Career ==
In 1956, President Paul Magloire attempted to extend his term, which had ended on December 6. Cantave opposed these dictatorial plans, being arrested by the Magloire regime for "inciting rebellion". On December 13, after Magloire's fall and his release, Cantave was appointed as Army Chief of Staff by the new president Joseph Nemours Pierre-Louis. As Army Chief, Cantave publicly advocated political neutrality within the Armed Forces.

In early 1957, a general strike broke out against the Pierre-Louis government, which resulted in the resignation of President Pierre-Louis on February 3. General Cantave declared neutrality regarding the strike, his soldiers did not fire a single shot at the crowd. Informed of Pierre-Louis' resignation, Cantave called the 7 presidential candidates to Headquarters to inform them of the situation. After endless debates, on February 7 the Haitian Parliament chose Franck Sylvain as provisional president, one of the declared candidates.

On April 2, Cantave forced the resignation of President Franck Sylvain and placed him under house arrest in a coup d'état, claiming that Sylvain was complicit in the civil unrest and bomb affair. Cantave now had power in his hands, but decided that the crisis should be resolved by civilians. On April 6, Cantave established the Executive Government Council (CEG), a collegial government formed by representatives appointed by presidential candidates.

After the Executive Council ordered his dismissal in favor of police chief Pierre Armand as Army Chief, Cantave usurped power again on May 20, proclaiming the dissolution of the CEG. This led to a climate of civil war that almost materialized on May 25, when there was a battle between supporters of Cantave and Armand. After an agreement, the army handed over the presidency to Daniel Fignolé. Both Cantave and Armand submitted their resignations, Antonio Thrasybule Kébreau was appointed as the new Army Chief. Under the presidency of François Duvalier, General Cantave was forced to retire from the Army.

In July 1963, together with Lieutenant Colonel René Léon, he launched an attempt to overthrow the dictator François Duvalier, across the border of the Dominican Republic. On August 7, 1963, the siege of Port-au-Prince took place, where President Duvalier was hiding in his presidential palace. Over several weeks, he fought several battles with the Haitian regular army until he finally suffered a severe defeat on September 22, 1963, in an attempt to capture the Ouanaminthe barracks. Three days later, a military coup took place against Dominican President Juan Bosch, with a junta succeeding him. Cantave was held in detention by the Dominican junta, but he was eventually allowed into exile. Cantave died in exile in France on February 16, 1967.
