= Yolette Leconte =

31st First Lady of Haiti
- In office December 6, 1950 – December 6, 1956
- President: Paul Eugene Magloire
- Preceded by: Lucienne Heurtelou
- Succeeded by: Marguerite L. Chauvet

Personal details
- Born: July 7, 1917 La Fossette, Cap-Haitien, Haiti
- Died: June 13, 1981 (aged 63) Queens, New York], United States
- Spouse: Paul Eugene Magloire
- Relations: Jean-Jacques Dessalines; Cincinnatus Leconte; Florvil Hyppolite; Nissage Saget
- Children: 5

Marie Anne Jacques Yolette "Yole" Leconte (1917–1981) served as the First Lady of Haiti from 1950 to 1956.

== Early life ==
Yolette was the daughter of the deputy Pierre Paul francois Narces Leconte and his cousin Gabrielle Leconte, a niece of President Cincinnatus Leconte, and a descendant of Jean-Jacques Dessalines. Yolette was born and raised in La Fossette, Cap-Haitien. After her father's death in 1930, at the age of 15, her mother registered her at a boarding school of Mrs. Maud Turien at Port-au-Prince. On August 25, 1935, at a party for Quartier Morin, she met an officer named Paul Eugene Magloire. They were married less than a year later on April 18, 1936. On January 13, 1937, she gave birth to their only son Raymond Magloire at Cap-Haitien, Haiti. On June 29, 1938, she gave birth to the couple's first daughter, Elsie Magloire. On June 17, 1940, she gave birth to their second daughter, Myrtha Magloire. Later that year, she moved with her husband Paul to Port-au-Prince upon his appointment as Commandant of the National Penitentiary. While in Port-au-Prince, she gave birth to their third daughter, Paule Magloire, on March 20, 1944, and then to their last child, Yola Magloire, on June 10, 1947.

== Career and exile ==
On December 6, 1950, she became the First Lady of Haiti and 6 days later, she moved at the National Palace (Haiti). As First Lady, Leconte was very active in charity work, where she presided over charitable banquets, opened charity balls, inaugurated vaccination campaigns, inspected old people's hospices, visited hospitals, maternity wards and orphanages. Launched in 1951, with the opening of the Bel-Air canteen and the saline canteen, the Madame Paul E. Magloire Foundation was created to establish two solid educational and professional training institutions for young girls in Haiti, L'ecoles des arts menagers of Saint Martin and that of Cap-Haitien. On February 7, 1955, she and her husband traveled to Washington, D.C., for a State Visit, where they were welcomed by the Vice-President Richard Nixon and his wife. They were received by President Eisenhower at the White House for a State Dinner and lodged in the Lincoln Bedroom. During this trip, the Magloire's visited Nashville, Chicago, Boston and New York, where they received a ticker-tape parade on January 31, 1955. On December 12, 1956, Leconte was exiled with her husband to Kingston, Jamaica. Two weeks later she moved to Paris, France then in 1957 to Queens, New York.

== Illness and death ==
She first developed symptoms of Parkinson's disease in 1960, and then died 21 years later on June 13, 1981, in Queens, New York.
