= Robert Malval =

Haitian politician (born 1943)

5th Prime Minister of Haiti
- In office 30 August 1993 – 8 November 1994
- President: Émile Jonassaint (provisional)
- Preceded by: Marc Bazin
- Succeeded by: Smarck Michel

Personal details
- Born: 11 July 1943 (age 83) Port-au-Prince, Haiti
- Spouse: Linda Frisch
- Children: 3
- Education: University of Miami
- Occupation: Businessman

Robert Malval (born 11 July 1943 in Port-au-Prince) is a former prime minister of Haiti. He served from 30 August 1993 to 8 November 1994. He was preceded by Marc Bazin and was succeeded by Smarck Michel.

== Personal life ==
Malval was born on 11 July 1943 in Port-au-Prince to a Haitian father and a Lebanese mother. He attended high school and university in the United States, earning a degree in political science from the University of Miami, before moving to Paris for graduate work in international affairs. Prior to entering politics, he worked in his father-in-law's printing business before starting his own company.

== Political career ==
Malval was appointed on 16 August 1993 by President-in-exile Jean-Bertrand Aristide, who tasked Malval with reconciling the feuding parties. He defied the Army-backed president, Émile Jonassaint, by demanding state workers disregard Jonassaint's orders. In December 1993, he resigned his post and criticized Aristide as an "erratic" figure who was hampering efforts to solve the political crisis.
