= Eugene Francois Magloire =

Haitian military officer (1841–1908)

Commander of Grande-Riviere du Nord
- In office January 5, 1903 – February 6, 1908
- President: Pierre Nord Alexis
- Preceded by: Cyriaque Celestin

Commander-in-Chief of Fort Alexandre
- In office 1903 – February 6, 1908
- President: Pierre Nord Alexis

Personal details
- Born: July 1841 Quartier Morin, Haiti
- Died: February 6, 1908 (aged 66) Port-au-Prince, Haiti
- Resting place: Grand Cimetiere of Port-au-Prince, Haiti
- Relations: Jean-Jacques Magloire Francillette Celestin
- Children: Paul Eugene Magloire Arsene Magloire Herzulie Magloire Adelaide Magloire Josephine Magloire Grand-Jean Magloire
- Occupation: Military (Division General)

Military service
- Allegiance: Haiti
- Branch/service: Haitian Army
- Years of service: 1858–1908
- Rank: General

Eugène Francois Magloire (July 1841 – February 6, 1908) was a general of the Haitian army.

== Early life ==
Magloire was the youngest of eight children born to Jean-Jacques Magloire of Dominica and Francillette Celestin. He was born in mid-1841. Magloire had a sister named Juliette and six brothers: Urbain-Pierre, Jean-Pierre, Riche, Julien, Desauguste, Pierre-Jacques. During his studies in Grande-Riviere du Nord in 1858, his father was employed as a soldier and assigned to the east of the country as the head of Haiti's fifth regiment.

== Career ==
During the Firminist revolt in 1902, President Nord Alexis assigned Magloire the responsibility of defending Fort Belair in Cap-Haïtien. That same year, Haiti entered a civil war to fight for the seat of the presidency, and Magloire worked as a spy during the war. The advisor of the War Department established his headquarters in Cagnette, and Magloire held a military march with his leader, distinguishing himself at the boulevard of Limbe. On January 5, 1903, he became commander of Grande Riviere du Nord, succeeding general Clément Gabriel Cyriaque Etienne Celestin whom was commander since 1894. President Nord Alexis kept Magloire in the capital at Fort National of Port-au-Prince. Later that year, Magloire became Commander-in-Chief of Fort Alexandre.

In 1904, Magloire became the Provisional Commander of Fort National. He became the honorary aide-de-camp and general of division of President Nord Alexis. The president kept Magloire in Port-au-Prince at Haiti's Fort National. On February 8, 1907, Magloire assisted General Dorce Lafalaise's Funeral in Croix-des-Bouquets. On April 20, 1907, a whirlwind overturned a costume depot in an office where soldiers of the 10th regiment of mirebalais were standing. There were five deaths and thirty-five injuries. The next day, he attended the dead soldiers' funeral, which took place at Sainte Anne Church of Port-au-Prince. On August 15, 1907, General Albert Louis Gousse died and Magloire commanded the general's funeral at Sainte Anne Church of Limonade.

== Death and funeral ==
During a military mission at Port-de-Paix, Magloire was charged during a scuffle. A soldier took off, saying Magloire's wallet dropped from his person and inadvertently triggered his revolver. One of the bullets misfired and penetrated Magloire's spine. He went back to Port-au-Prince for surgery. Due to the gravity of his case, on February 5, 1908, he decided to marry his fiancé, Philomene Matthieu. On the morning of February 6, 1908, Magloire died at the age of 66 at Port-au-Prince. The next morning, the Haitian Government gave him an imposing funeral. His body was installed in the House of Representatives. Then at 08:00, a convoy took his body away. General Jules Coicou ordered numerous officers and Major State Members of the President of The Republic to precede the hearse. The funeral was held at the Cathedral of Our Lady of the Assumption, Port-au-Prince. At the cemetery, his close friend Frédéric Marcelin read a speech to recall the qualities of General Magloire.

== Family ==
Magloire's descendants were also involved in politics. His son Regulis Magloire became a general; Jacques Magloire became a Senator; Fernand became Director of the Regie de Tabac, Membre de la Commission Communal de Port-au-Prince; and Arsene Magloire became Minister of Defense from 1950 to 1952. His youngest son Paul Eugene Magloire joined the army in 1930 and later served as President of Haiti from 1950 to 1956.

His Nephew Darius Magloire became Deputy.

Two of his grandsons Raymond Montreuil became a lieutenant and Roger Prophete a colonel in the Haitian Army.

His great-grandson Roland Magloire was a soldier in the army and a presidential candidate of Haiti in 2016.

His great-grandnephews Jean Destorel Joseph became Regional Inspector and Director of the North, Northwest, West and Artibonite of Haiti and Director of the Care Foundation, Luc Alexis became Sergeant in the Haitian Army and the Commander of Grande Riviere du Nord and Milot, from 1959 to 1989, and Rene Magloire served as a minister of justice and public security twice in 1995–1996 and 2006–2008. Then in 2013–2015, he was president of Inite.

== Personal life ==
Magloire had 18 children: 7 with Hermancia Saint-Louis, 8 with his wife Marie-Philomene Matthieu, 2 with Louise Virgile and 1 with Louisianne Edouard.

=== Children with Hermancia Saint-Louis ===
- Marcius Magloire
- Marie Magdelaine Uciline Magloire (1861 – ????)
- Atius Magloire (1877 – ????)
- Sylvain Eugene Francois Magloire (September 4, 1881 – ????)
- Regulis Eugene Magloire (died while crossing a river during a Cacos War between 1915 and 1922)
- Ceciline Magloire
- Antoine Eugene Magloire

=== Children with Marie Philomene Matthieu ===
- Jean-de-Dieu Grandjean Magloire (June 24, 1886 – June 24, 1952)
- Adelaide Magloire (1894 – December 7, 1978)
- Hersulie Magloire (1897 – December 25, 1994)
- Jacques Eugene Magloire (July 24, 1898 – October 20, 1961)
- Josephine Magloire (March 19, 1899 – January 9, 1994)
- Lucita Magloire (1902 – ????)
- Arsene Michel Eugene Magloire (May 8, 1905 – May 7, 2003)
- Paul Eugene Magloire (July 19, 1907 – July 12, 2001)

=== Children with Louisianne Edouard ===
- Marie Clelie Edouard Magloire (1905 – August 29, 1977)

=== Children with Louise Virgile ===
- Anne Eugenie Magloire (December 4, 1904 – February 3, 1974)
- Louis Marcius Fernand Magloire (May 11, 1906 – ????)

== Legacy ==
On December 8, 1954, Paul Eugene Magloire inaugurated a barrack name Caserne Eugene Magloire in Port-de-Paix, Haiti. The Barrack of his accident.
