= Ronald S. Coleman =

US Marine Corps general (born 1948)

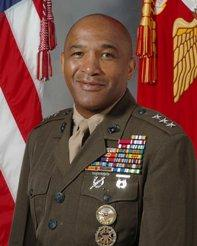
- Born: August 27, 1948 (age 78); Darby, Pennsylvania, US
- Military career
- Allegiance: United States of America
- Branch: United States Marine Corps; United States Navy
- Service years: 1968–1970 (USN); 1974–2009 (USMC)
- Rank: Lieutenant general
- Commands: Manpower and Reserve Affairs
- Conflicts: Vietnam War; Iraq War: Operation Iraqi Freedom
- Awards: Legion of Merit; Gold Medal of French Defense

Ronald S. Coleman (born August 27, 1948) is a former United States Marine Corps officer. Coleman, advanced in rank to lieutenant general on October 27, 2006, became the second African-American in the Marine Corps to reach the 3-star rank.

== Personal ==
Ronald S. Coleman was born on August 24, 1948. He graduated from Darby-Colwyn Senior High School, Darby, Pennsylvania, where he played basketball, baseball, and football. After high school graduation, he attended North East Christian School for a year.

He then enlisted in the Navy and served in Vietnam. After two years of service, he was discharged from the Navy. He returned to Darby as a part-time police officer while attending Cheyney State University. He graduated in 1973. He then taught and coached in Darby before returning to the military.

In 2016, Coleman had a street named in his honor — Ronald S. Coleman Boulevard — in his hometown of Darby, Pennsylvania.

Coleman was married to Kathryn Jane Cashion for 50 years. They have five daughters. Kathryn Coleman died in 2014.

== Military career ==
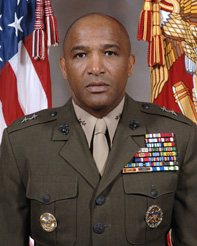
Coleman in 2006

Coleman joined the United States Navy in April 1968 and was discharged upon his return from Danang, Republic of Vietnam in June 1970. He returned to civilian life and earned his undergraduate degree in 1973. After working for a year, he decided to return to the military, interviewing with the four branches, before deciding on the Marine Corps. He was commissioned a second lieutenant in December 1974. Following the Basic School in 1975, he reported to Camp Lejeune with 2nd Marine Regiment and served as the regimental supply officer, platoon commander, and S-4A.

In November 1977, Coleman transferred to 3rd Force Service Support Group, Okinawa, Japan, and deployed with Landing Support Unit Foxtrot.

In November 1978, he reported to Officer Candidate School, where he served as the S-4, supply officer, candidate platoon commander and director, Non-Commissioned Officer School. He attended Amphibious Warfare School during the 1981–82 academic year and was then transferred to HQMC Officer Assignment Branch, and served as a company grade monitor and administrative assistant to the director, Personnel Management Division. In August 1985, Major Coleman was assigned as an instructor at Amphibious Warfare School. In 1987, he attended the Marine Corps Command and Staff College.

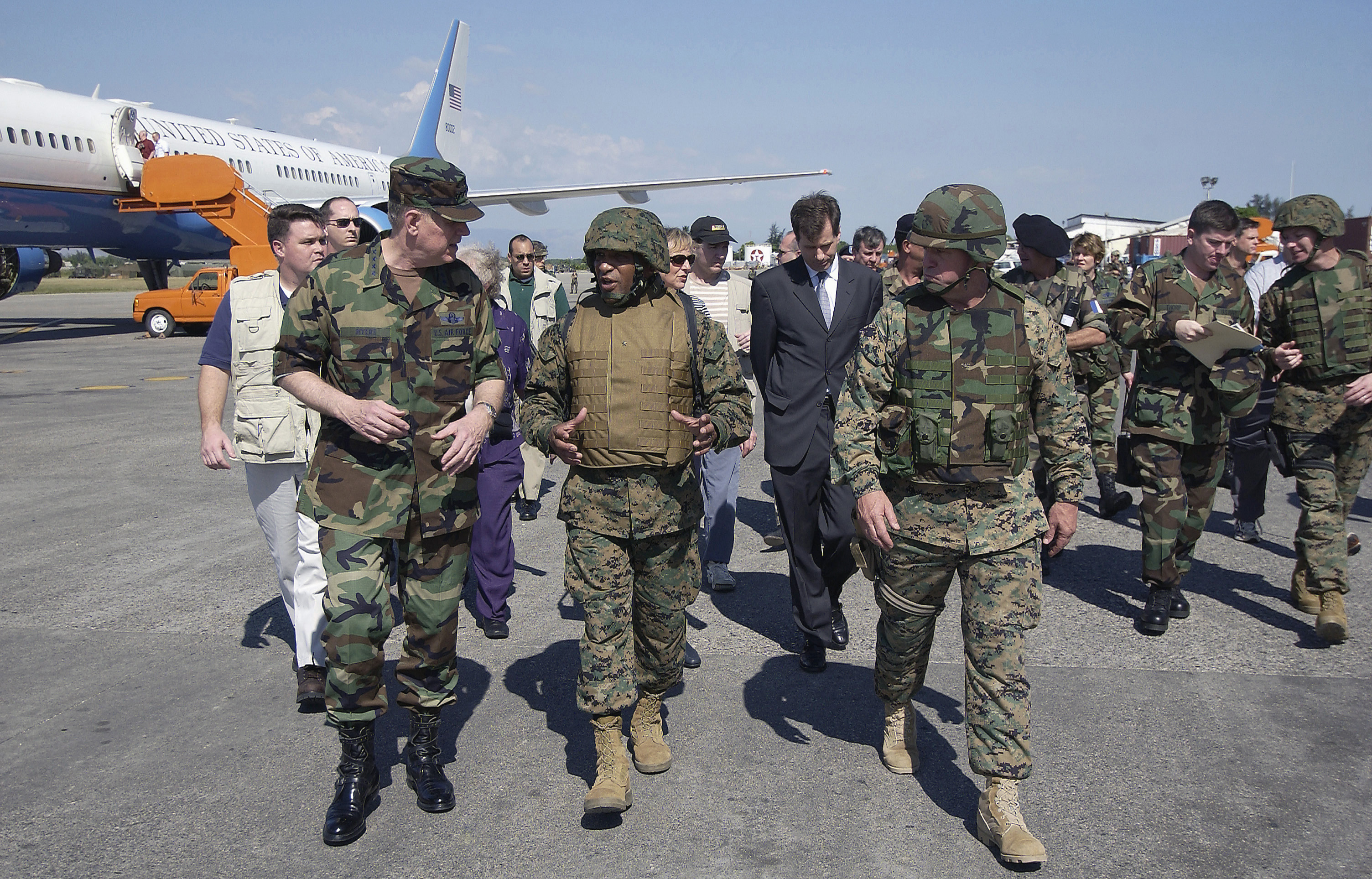
Brigadier General Ronald S. Coleman with Chairman of the Joint Chiefs of Staff General Richard B. Myers at Port-au-Prince Airport during General Myers visit to inspect U.S. troops deployed to Haiti as part of peacekeeping operations in Haiti. At that time General Coleman was the on-scene Commanders in-charged of U.S. troops that was deployed to Haiti.

In 1988, he returned to Okinawa and served as the operations officer, 3rd Landing Support Battalion; executive officer, 3rd Maintenance Battalion; and commanding officer, Combat Service Support Detachment 35, Contingency Marine Air Group Task Force 4-90.

In June 1991, he reported to HQMC and served as the logistics project officer and head, Maintenance Policy Section, Installations and Logistics Branch. He was promoted to lieutenant colonel in May 1992.

In June 1993, he assumed duty as commanding officer, 2nd Maintenance Battalion, 2nd Force Service Support Group, and in December 1994, was reassigned as the group deputy operations officer. In August 1995, he reported to the Industrial College of the Armed Forces, National Defense University.

In 1996, he reported to the Pentagon in the Logistics Directorate J-4, as deputy division chief, Logistic Readiness Center.

He was promoted to colonel in July 1997 and returned to Camp Lejeune in 1998 for duty with the 2nd Marine Division as the Assistant Chief of Staff, G-4. In April 1999, he deployed to the Balkan Region and served as J-4, Joint Task Force Shining Hope. He assumed command of 2nd Supply Battalion in July 1999. In June 2001 he reported to HQMC as the Assistant Deputy Commandant Installations and Logistics (Facilities) and was promoted to brigadier general in November 2002.

Coleman reported to 2nd Force Service Support Group in June 2003 and deployed in support of Operation Iraqi Freedom as Commanding General Special Purpose MAGTF until November 2003. He deployed again from February 2004 until June 2004 as commanding general, Combined Joint Task Force Haiti, in support of Operation Secure Tomorrow. For his leadership in Haiti, the French government awarded him the Gold Medal of French Defense.

Coleman was assigned as the director of the Personnel Management Division on July 1, 2005, and was advanced in rank to major general in May 2006.

On September 29, 2006, Coleman was assigned as Deputy Commander for Manpower and Reserve Affairs and selected for appointment to the rank of lieutenant general. He received his third star on October 27, 2006. At the time, he was only the second African American to attain the rank of lieutenant general in the United States Marine Corps. His third star was pinned by LtGen Frank E. Petersen, the first African-American to become a general in the U.S. Marine Corps.

In December 2009, Coleman retired and turned his command of Manpower and Reserve Affairs over to LtGen Richard C. Zilmer.

== Awards and decorations ==

| 1st Row | Defense Superior Service Medal | | Legion of Merit | Defense Meritorious Service Medal |
| 2nd Row | Meritorious Service Medal w/ 1 award star | Joint Service Commendation Medal | Joint Meritorious Unit Award | Navy Unit Commendation w/ 1 service star |
| 3rd Row | Navy Meritorious Unit Commendation | National Defense Service Medal w/ 2 service stars | Armed Forces Expeditionary Medal | Vietnam Service Medal w/ 3 service stars |
| 4th Row | Kosovo Campaign Medal | Global War on Terrorism Expeditionary Medal | Global War on Terrorism Service Medal | Armed Forces Service Medal |
| 5th Row | Humanitarian Service Medal | Navy Sea Service Deployment Ribbon w/ 5 service stars | Marine Corps Drill Instructor Ribbon | Médaille de la Défense nationale, Gold |
| 7th Row | Vietnam Gallantry Cross unit citation | Vietnam Civil Actions unit citation | NATO Medal for Kosovo | Vietnam Campaign Medal |
| Office of the Secretary of Defense Identification Badge | | | Office of the Joint Chiefs of Staff Identification Badge | |

== See also ==
- Military history of African Americans
- Ronald L. Bailey (USMC)
