= Robinson, Silverman, Pearce, Aronsohn, and Berman =

Law firm in NYC, NY, US (1950–2003)

- Headquarters: New York, USA
- Date founded: 1950
- Dissolved: 2002
- Website: www.robinsonsilverman.com

Robinson, Silverman, Pearce, Aronsohn, and Berman was a New York City law firm which practiced from 1950 until 2002. At its height, the firm employed 170 attorneys.

== History ==
The firm was founded in 1950. One partner, Edward I. Koch, served as the mayor of New York from 1978 through 1989 and joined the law firm in 1990. An associate, Mildred Trouillot, later became the first lady of Haiti. Another associate, Rand Levin, began as a litigator for the firm before later becoming the Vice Senior President, Business & Legal Affairs at Universal Music Group. U.S. federal judge Leonard B. Sand was a partner for 19 years when the firm was called Robinson, Silverman, Pearce, Aronsohn, Sand and Berman.

== Merger ==
In July 2002, the firm merged with St. Louis–based Bryan Cave LLP to become Bryan Cave Robinson Silverman. In January 2003, the firm's name officially reverted to Bryan Cave.
