= Joseph Philippe Lemercier Laroche =

Haitian engineer, RMS Titanic victim (1886–1912)

- Joseph (seated right) and his family, prior to their voyage on the Titanic
- Born: Joseph Philippe Lemercier Laroche; 26 May 1886; Cap-Haïtien, Haiti
- Died: 15 April 1912 (aged 25); North Atlantic Ocean
- Occupation: Engineer
- Spouse: Juliette Lafargue (m. 1908)
- Children: 3

Joseph Philippe Lemercier Laroche (French pronunciation: [ʒozɛf filip ləmɛʁsje laʁɔʃ]; 26 May 1886 – 15 April 1912) was a Haitian engineer and one of three black passengers on the ill-fated voyage of the Titanic (the other two being his children). He put his pregnant French wife and their two daughters onto a lifeboat; they survived, but he did not. Joseph's daughter Louise Laroche (2 July 1910 – 28 January 1998) was one of the last remaining Titanic survivors at the time of her death.

== Early life, family and education ==
Joseph was born in Cap-Haïtien, Haiti. When he was 15 years old, he was sent to Beauvais, France to study. After earning an engineering degree, he married a French woman named Juliette Lafargue. Due to the racial discrimination of the times, however, he had difficulty finding work. His daughter Simone Marie Anne Andrée Laroche was born in Paris, France, 1909, followed by her sister, Louise Laroche, born on 2 July 1910. Tired of living off his father-in-law, a wine merchant, Joseph decided to return to Haiti with his growing family. His uncle, Cincinnatus Leconte, was the President of Haiti, and he arranged a job for Joseph as a mathematics teacher.

== Voyage ==
The family planned to leave France in late 1912, but Juliette discovered she was pregnant for a third time, and Joseph decided to hasten their travel arrangements so the child could be born in Haiti.

Joseph's mother purchased first class passage for the family aboard the liner SS France. The Laroches learned of the French Line's policy stipulating that children were required to remain in the nursery and were not permitted to dine with their parents. Disapproving of this policy, they exchanged their tickets for a second-class passage aboard RMS Titanic.

Titanic was too large for the harbor at Cherbourg, France, so White Star Line tenders transported the passengers boarding from Cherbourg out to the ship aboard SS Nomadic. The family boarded as second-class passengers on April 10, 1912.

Shortly after Titanic struck the iceberg at 11:40 p.m. on April 14, Joseph woke his wife Juliette and told her that the ship had suffered an accident. He put all of their valuables in his pockets, and they carried their sleeping daughters to the ship's top deck. Juliette and their two daughters then boarded lifeboats. Although Joseph died in the sinking of Titanic, his body was never recovered.

Later in the morning of April 15, Juliette and her daughters were rescued by RMS Carpathia. The two girls were hauled onto the deck in burlap bags. Onboard Carpathia, Juliette found it very hard to get linens which she could use as diapers for her children. Since there were none to spare, Juliette improvised and at the end of each meal she would sit on napkins, conceal them and make diapers out of them after returning to the cabin. Carpathia arrived in New York City on April 18. Since there was no one to meet Juliette and her daughters, Juliette decided not to continue to Haiti. Instead, she returned to her family in Villejuif, France. The family arrived the next month, and it was there that Juliette gave birth to her son whom she named Joseph, in honor of his father.

== Aftermath ==
In March 1995, Joseph's daughter Louise stepped aboard Nomadic for the first time since 1912 when it carried her family to Titanic from Cherbourg, France. She was joined by fellow Titanic survivor Millvina Dean. That same year, Louise was present as the Titanic Historical Society dedicated a stone marker in Cherbourg commemorating Titanic passengers who sailed from its port.

Louise Laroche died on 28 January 1998 at the age of 87. At the time of her death six Titanic survivors remained.

== Legacy ==
LaRoche, a three-act opera by Atlanta composer Sharon J. Willis, is based on his life and was part of the 2003 National Black Arts Festival, premiering at the Callanwolde Fine Arts Center on July 18 of that year.

A play, Laroche was written about him in 2024 by Carlette L. Norwood.
