= Mildred Trouillot =

American lawyer (born 1963)

First Lady of Haiti
- In role February 4, 2001 – February 29, 2004
- President: Jean-Bertrand Aristide
- Preceded by: Guerda Benoît
- Succeeded by: Célima Dorcély Alexandre
- In role January 20, 1996 – February 7, 1996
- President: Jean-Bertrand Aristide
- Preceded by: Marie-Thérèse Jonassaint (1994)
- Succeeded by: Guerda Benoît

Personal details
- Born: 1963 (age 62–63) New York, U.S.
- Spouse: Jean-Bertrand Aristide (m. 1996)
- Children: Christine Aristide; Michaelle Aristide
- Education: City College of New York; University of Pennsylvania Law School
- Occupation: Lawyer

Mildred Trouillot-Aristide (born 1963) is an American lawyer who married Jean-Bertrand Aristide, the former President of Haïti, in 1996.

Mildred Trouillot grew up in the Bronx. Both her father, Emile, and mother, Carmelle, were natives of Haïti. He left Haïti in 1958, she in 1960. They found work in New York City, where Emile worked in a steel factory. Carmelle worked as a laboratory technician.

Mildred graduated from St. Barnabas High School, City College of New York, and the University of Pennsylvania Law School. She practiced commercial litigation for the Manhattan law firm of Robinson, Silverman, Pearce, Aronsohn, and Berman. She met Aristide at a lecture he gave in 1992. In 1994, she went to work for Aristide's government in exile in Washington, D.C. as a speechwriter, as well as doing legal work.

They married on January 20, 1996, in a simple ceremony in Port-au-Prince. It was a controversial marriage in Haïti. Aristide was elected president while he was a Catholic priest, and had given up the priesthood by the time he married Mildred.

The couple has two daughters, Christine Aristide, born in November 1996, and Michaelle Aristide, born in 1998.
