= Cincinnatus Leconte =

President of Haiti (1854-1912)

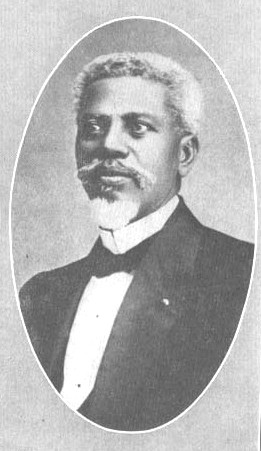

19th President of Haiti
- In office August 15, 1911 – August 8, 1912
- Preceded by: François C. Antoine Simon
- Succeeded by: Tancrède Auguste

Minister of Public Works and Agriculture
- In office December 13, 1897 – May 12, 1902
- Preceded by: Jean-Chrisostome Arteaud
- Succeeded by: Démosthène Césarions

Personal details
- Born: Michel Cincinnatus Leconte; September 29, 1854 Saint-Michel-de-l'Atalaye, Haiti
- Died: August 8, 1912 (aged 57) Port-au-Prince, Haiti
- Party: National Party
- Relations: Jean-Jacques Dessalines Florvil Hyppolite Nissage Saget Yolette Leconte
- Profession: Engineer, businessman, industrialist, teacher

Jean Jacques Dessalines Michel Cincinnatus Leconte (September 29, 1854 – August 8, 1912) was President of Haiti from August 15, 1911, until his death on August 8, 1912.

He was the great-grandson of Jean-Jacques Dessalines—a leader of the Haitian Revolution and the first ruler of an independent Haiti—and was an uncle of Joseph Laroche, the only black passenger to perish on the RMS Titanic.

== Political career ==
Leconte, a lawyer by trade, had served as minister of the interior under President Pierre Nord Alexis. He was forced into exile in Jamaica after a 1908 revolt deposed Alexis and gave François C. Antoine Simon the presidency.

Returning from exile in 1911, Leconte gathered a large military force. After leading the revolution that ousted President Simon and brought Leconte back to Port-au-Prince in triumph on August 7, 1911, Leconte was unanimously elected president of Haiti by Congress on August 14 with a seven-year term. His salary was set at $24,000 a year.

Upon attaining the presidency he instituted a number of reforms: paving streets, increasing teacher pay, installing telephone lines, and decreasing the size of the army. Collier's Weekly argued in August 1912 that it was "generally admitted" that Leconte's administration was "the ablest and the cleanest government Haiti has had in forty years." Zora Neale Hurston, writing in the 1930s after extensive research in Haiti, pointed out that Leconte was "credited with beginning numerous reforms and generally taking positive steps."

Leconte pursued a discriminatory policy toward the local Syrian population (Christian migrants from Ottoman Syria), an already persecuted minority group which one historian described as constituting the "opening wedge of the American economic conquest of Haiti in the early 1900s." Prior to ascending to the presidency, he had promised to rid Haiti of its Syrian population. In 1912 Leconte's foreign minister released a statement stating that it was "necessary to protect nationals against the disloyal competition of the Easterner whose nationality is uncertain." A 1903 law (aimed specifically at Syrians) limiting the immigration levels and commercial activities of foreigners was revived, and the harassment of Syrians that had been prevalent in the first few years of the 1900s was resumed. The Leconte administration did, however, continue to process claims made by Syrians who had been persecuted by the government of Nord Alexis. When Leconte died suddenly in 1912, a number of Syrians celebrated his passing and were imprisoned as a result, while others were deported. His Syrian policy would be continued by his successor Tancrède Auguste.

== Death ==
Despite being elected to a seven-year term, Leconte's time in office was short lived. On August 8, 1912, a violent explosion destroyed the National Palace, killing the president and several hundred soldiers. An Associated Press report at the time noted:

So great was the force of the explosion, that a number of small cannon, fragments of iron and shell were thrown long distances in all directions, and many of the palace attendants were killed. Every house in the city was shaken violently and the entire population, greatly alarmed, rushed into the street.

A 1912 account of the explosion in Political Science Quarterly reported that an "accidental ignition of ammunition stores caused the death of General Cincinnatus Leconte," while a 1927 article in the same journal deemed his death an "assassination." Oral histories circulating in Haiti—some of which were chronicled by Hurston in the 1930s in her book Tell My Horse: Voodoo and Life in Haiti and Jamaica—differed significantly from most written accounts. As Hurston explained, "The history books all say Cincinnatus Leconte died in the explosion that destroyed the palace, but the people do not tell it that way. Not one person, high or low, ever told me that Leconte was killed by the explosion. It is generally accepted that the destruction of the palace was to cover up the fact that the President was already dead by violence." According to Hurston there were "many reasons given for the alleged assassination", but the main actors in the supposed plot were men who "were ambitious and stood to gain political power...by the death of President Leconte."

Just several months before Leconte died, his nephew, Joseph Philippe Lemercier Laroche, had been one of over 2,200 passengers and crew on board the RMS Titanic for its maiden voyage. While Laroche's wife and daughters survived the sinking of the ocean liner, Laroche himself, the only man of African descent on board the ship, perished in the disaster.

Political offices
Preceded by François C. Antoine Simon	President of Haïti; 1911–1912	Succeeded by Tancrède Auguste
