= René Sylvestre =

Haitian jurist and lawyer (1962–2021)

President of the Supreme Court
- In office 1 February 2019 – 23 June 2021
- Appointed by: Jovenel Moïse
- Preceded by: Jules Cantave
- Succeeded by: Jean Joseph Lebrun

Personal details
- Born: 14 September 1962 Saint-Marc, Haiti
- Died: 23 June 2021 (aged 58) Mirebalais, Haiti

René Sylvestre (14 September 1962 – 23 June 2021) was a Haitian jurist and lawyer. He had served as President of the Supreme Court of Haiti from 2019 until his death in 2021.

== Biography ==
Sylvestre was born into a working-class family. Following his secondary studies in Saint-Marc, he attended university and earned a law degree. He devoted a large part of his life towards justice in Haiti.

From September 1993 to November 1994, Sylvestre was commissioner of the first court of Saint-Marc. In 1996, he was appointed judge, the start of a long career in the Haitian judiciary. From 12 June 1998 to 12 May 2004, he was Dean of the Court of First Instance of Saint-Marc. That year, he was appointed to the Supreme Court. On 3 February 2016, he joined the Superior Council of the court. On 1 February 2019, he was appointed to succeed Jules Cantave as President of the Supreme Court by President Jovenel Moïse.

Sylvestre died of COVID-19 at Mirebalais University Hospital on 23 June 2021, at the age of 58.
