= Tancrède Auguste =

20th President of Haiti (1856–1913)

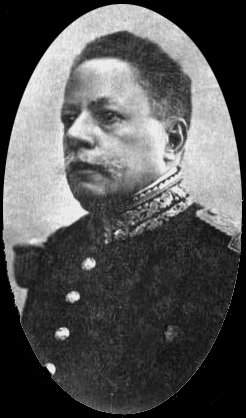

20th President of Haiti
- In office August 8, 1912 – May 2, 1913
- Preceded by: Cincinnatus Leconte
- Succeeded by: Michel Oreste

Minister of Interior and Police
- In office November 24, 1908 – November 30, 1908
- President: Pierre Nord Alexis
- Preceded by: Villehardouin Leconte
- Succeeded by: Reneaud Hyppolite
- In office December 13, 1897 – May 12, 1902
- President: Tirésias Simon Sam
- Preceded by: François Luxembourg Cauvin
- Succeeded by: Saint-Fort Colin
- In office November 12, 1895 – April 6, 1896
- President: Florvil Hyppolite
- Preceded by: Souffrant Papillon
- Succeeded by: Louis Joseph Buteau

Personal details
- Born: Joseph Antoine Tancrède Auguste; March 16, 1856 Cap-Haïtien, Haiti
- Died: May 2, 1913 (aged 57) Port-au-Prince, Haiti
- Party: National Party
- Spouse: Rose Joseph Ansolinette Durand
- Children: Frederick Auguste, Antoinette Auguste Grandchildren: Suze Auguste, Lousina Auguste, Yolène Auguste, Mimose Auguste Great-grandchildren : Jean Gardy Bien Aimé, Ridore Kerensky, Carlene Auguste, Salvan Donald, Ovens Lazard
- Profession: Military general and President of Haiti

Joseph Antoine Tancrède Auguste (French pronunciation: [ʒozɛf ɑ̃twan tɑ̃kʁɛd oɡyst]; March 16, 1856 – May 2, 1913) was the 20th President of Haiti from August 8, 1912 until his death in office on May 2, 1913. He assumed the presidency the day that Cincinnatus Leconte died in office from a massive explosion that destroyed the presidential palace. Auguste served in this capacity for less than one year, as he became ill and died while traveling in the north of the country in early May 1913. Although some claim he was the victim of poisoning, his death was caused by severe anemia due to untreated, advanced syphilis. He was the grandfather of Haitian writer Jacques Roumain.

== Life ==
Auguste was born in Cap-Haïtien, the son of André P. Auguste and Ernestine Rotgers. He was the owner of a trading house in Port-au-Prince, then became Minister of the Interior and Police under the presidencies of Florvil Hyppolite and Tirésias Simon Sam. He was part of the Council of Secretaries of State (with Tiresias Simon Sam and Solon Ménos) who ensured the transition to power from March 24, 1896 to March 31, 1896, between the death of Hyppolite and the election of Tiresias Simon Sam.

On a trip to the north of the country, Auguste was sick and died May 2, 1913. The Council of Secretaries of State composed of Seymour Pradel, F. Baufosse Laroche, Jacques Nicolas Leger, Tertullien Guilbaud, Edmond Lespinasse and Guatimosin Boco took power from May 3 to 12, 1913.

August married Ancelinette Rose Durand on March 16, 1878, with whom he had 7 children. He is the grandfather of Jacques Roumain, a poet, writer, and Communist politician who had a considerable influence on Haitian culture.

Political offices
Preceded by Cincinnatus Leconte	President of Haiti; 1912–13	Succeeded by Michel Oreste
