= Elisabeth Delatour Préval =

Haitian businesswoman and economist

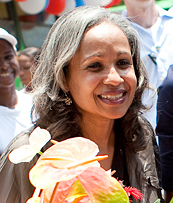

First Lady of Haiti
- In role December 6, 2009 – May 14, 2011
- President: René Préval
- Preceded by: Célima Dorcély Alexandre (2006)
- Succeeded by: Sophia Martelly

Personal details
- Born: 1962 (age 63–64)
- Spouse(s): Leslie Delatour (died in 2001); René Préval (2009–2017)
- Relations: Henri Namphy (uncle)
- Education: George Washington University

Elisabeth Débrosse Delatour Préval (born around 1962) is a Haitian businesswoman, presidential economic advisor and economist. She became the First Lady of Haiti in December 6, 2009, when she married President René Préval.

== Professional and personal life ==
Delatour is the widow of Leslie Delatour, the former governor of the Banque de la République d'Haïti, the country's central bank. The couple had two children together during their marriage, which lasted until Leslie Delatour's death on January 26, 2001.

Delatour received an MBA from The George Washington University in 1988. She has worked as a businesswoman for a Haitian electrical utility as well as a road contractor during her career. She worked as an economic advisor to President René Préval before her marriage to him in December 2009.

== First Lady of Haiti ==
Elisabeth Débrosse Delatour married René Préval on Sunday, December 6, 2009, becoming First Lady of Haiti. The wedding was held at 11 a.m. at Delatour's home in Furcy, a suburb of the capital, Port-au-Prince. Delatour, who was 47 years old at the time of the wedding, wore a beige dress, while Preval wore a white suit. The ceremony was attended by approximately fifty people. This was Delatour's second marriage, while Preval had been married twice before, both of which ended in divorce. The couple went on a two-day honeymoon before moving into the National Palace officially on December 9, 2009.

=== 2010 Haiti earthquake ===
Delatour Preval was thrust into the international recovery efforts in January 2010 following the 2010 Haiti earthquake, which devastated Port-au-Prince and the surrounding region. The First Lady and President both escaped the National Palace, which collapsed in the earthquake. The couple were about to enter the private, presidential living quarters in the National Palace when the earthquake struck. Both were able to move away from the palace before the building collapsed. False rumors initially spread in Port-au-Prince that Delatour Preval had been killed in the quake.

In the aftermath of the earthquake Delatour Preval told reporters, "I'm convinced the country will make it. Seeing the solidarity among the people, there is hope." Delatour Preval also defended the Haitian government of President Preval against criticism that it was ineffective, or even non-existent, in the days following the earthquake. She reiterated that the government was still functioning, while acknowledging that there was widespread concerns about government effectiveness, especially after the collapse of major government buildings, including the National Palace. In an interview, Delatour Preval stated, "Visually, people can’t see what they used to recognize as the symbols of the state...That has generated some kind of panic. ‘Are they there or aren’t they there?’"
