= Boniface Alexandre =

Haitian lawyer and jurist (1936–2023)

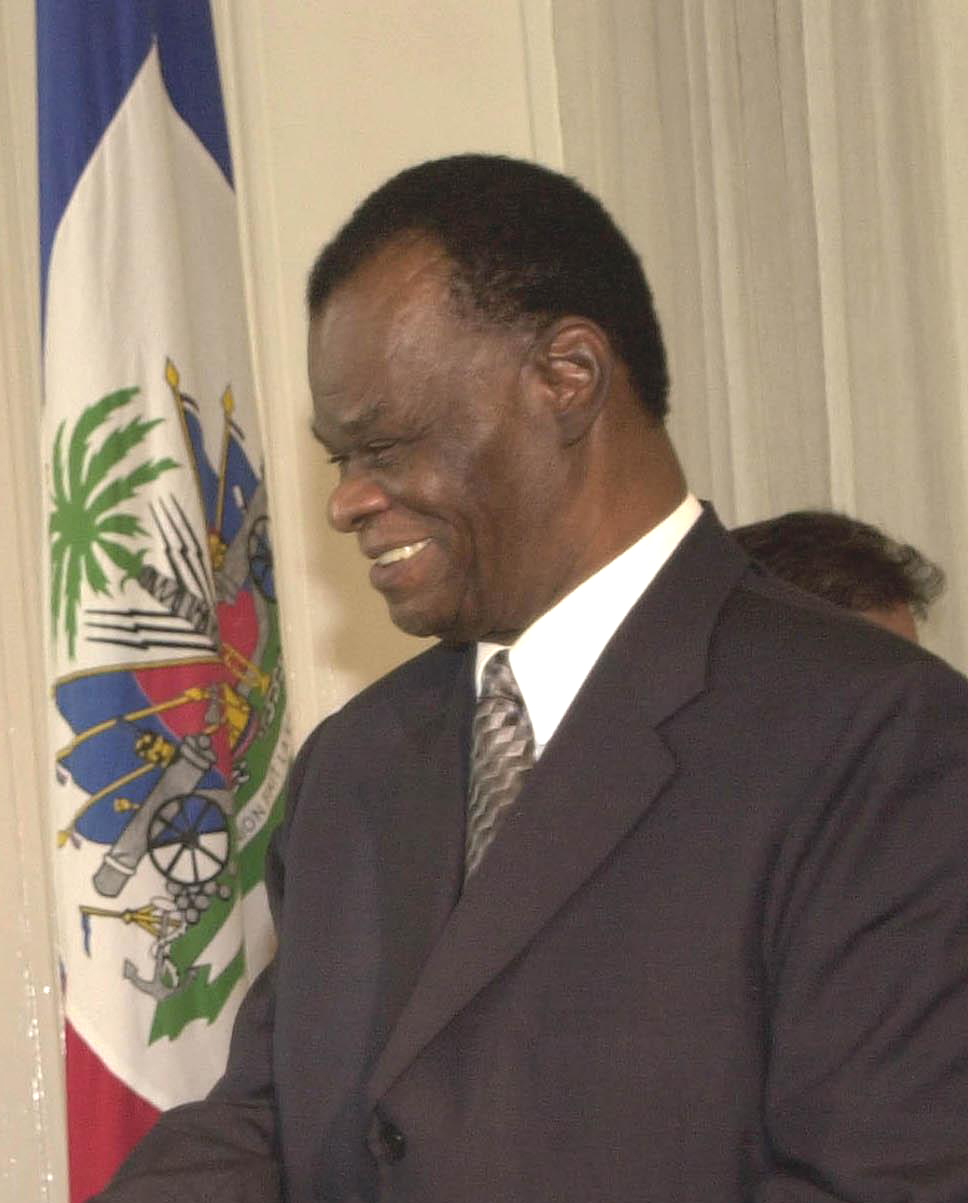
- Alexandre in 2004

Provisional President of Haiti
- In office 29 February 2004 – 14 May 2006
- Prime Minister: Yvon Neptune; Gérard Latortue
- Preceded by: Jean-Bertrand Aristide
- Succeeded by: René Préval

President of the Supreme Court of Haiti
- In office 2002–2004
- Preceded by: Clausel Débrosse
- Succeeded by: Georges Moïse

Personal details
- Born: 31 July 1936 Ganthier, Haiti
- Died: 4 August 2023 (aged 87) Port-au-Prince, Haiti
- Spouse: Célima Dorcély (m. 1990; died 2020)
- Children: 4
- Profession: Lawyer and jurist

Boniface Alexandre (French pronunciation: [bɔnifas alɛksɑ̃dʁ]; 31 July 1936 – 4 August 2023) was a Haitian lawyer and jurist who served as the president of the Supreme Court of Haiti from 2002 to 2004. After the 2004 coup d'état that removed Jean-Bertrand Aristide, he served as provisional president of Haiti until 2006.

Alexandre was born in Ganthier. After being trained as a lawyer, he worked at a law firm in Port-au-Prince for over two decades. He was appointed as a judge to the Court of Appeals in the late 1980s, and was named to the Supreme Court of Haiti in 1990. In 2002, he was appointed president of the Supreme Court by Aristide. While serving in that role, in 2004 Alexandre assumed the presidency, in accordance with the succession rules of the Haitian constitution. He had a largely symbolic role during his acting presidency and oversaw a transitional government that was tasked with organizing general elections. He stepped down as president after René Préval's victory in the presidential election, and later worked as a law professor. In 2020 the Jovenel Moïse administration made Alexandre the head of the Independent Advisory Committee to draft a new constitution.

== Early life and career ==
Boniface Alexandre was born in Ganthier, Ouest, Haiti, on 31 July 1936. He received his primary education at the National School of Ganthier, and secondary education at the Lycée Alexandre Pétion in Port-au-Prince. He was raised by his uncle, Martial Célestin, Haiti's first prime minister, and became a lawyer. Alexandre began working at a young age and took on the responsibility of financially supporting his siblings before starting his own family.

Alexandre worked for a law firm in Port-au-Prince for 25 years. During that time, he gained a reputation for honesty in a justice system that was notorious for corruption. His clients included the French embassy. At one point he left the city and returned to Ganthier to avoid the Tonton Macoute, the Duvalier dictatorship's secret police. In the late 1980s he was appointed to the Court of Appeals as a judge. Alexandre was appointed to the Supreme Court in 1990, and was made the president of the court in 2002 by President Jean-Bertrand Aristide.

== Provisional presidency ==
In early February 2004, an armed conflict broke out in Gonaïves, and armed groups threaten to enter Port-au-Prince after overrunning northern Haiti. Aristide fled the country on 29 February 2004, and Alexandre, as the President of the Supreme Court, was sworn in as provisional president of Haiti hours after Aristide's resignation was read out by Prime Minister Yvon Neptune. His assumption of the office was in accordance with the rules of succession under constitution of Haiti, though it required legislative approval, which was not done because the terms of over half of the Haitian parliament had expired in January. That evening, Haiti's permanent representative to the United Nations submitted Alexandre's request for international assistance, which included authorization for foreign troops to enter the country. It was granted by Security Council Resolution 1529, establishing the Multinational Interim Force, which became the United Nations Stabilisation Mission in Haiti (MINUSTAH) under Security Council Resolution 1542 on 30 April.

Alexandre and Neptune formed a government with assistance from the Caribbean Community. On 4 March, a Tripartite Council was formed with one representative each from Aristide's Fanmi Lavalas, the opposition Convergence Démocratique, and the international community. This group selected a seven-member Conseil des sages on 5 March, which included members from key sectors of Haitian society. Alexandre was installed at Haiti's National Palace on 8 March. The council chose a new prime minister the next day, when Gérard Latortue was selected from among three candidates. Latortue and the seven-member council formed a transitional government on 13 March. The new authorities agreed to hold elections before the end of 2005, and for a new elected president to be sworn in on 7 February 2006. Boniface, who believed in following the constitution's limitations on the presidency, mostly served a symbolic role, leaving Latortue as the dominant executive in the government.

=== Instability and elections ===
After the near-collapse of Haitian security forces and justice system in February 2004, the transitional government struggled restore order and uphold the rule of law with limited resources. During Alexandre's acting presidency, Amnesty International reported "excessive use of force by police officers", extrajudicial executions, a lack of investigations into these, escalation of "unlawful killings and kidnappings by illegal armed groups", failure of officials to prevent and punish violence against women, dysfunctionality of the justice system, and forty or more people imprisoned without charge or trial.

He and the transitional government organized the 2006 Haitian general election, which was originally planned to be held in late 2005 before being delayed. Alexandre called on the international community to support Haiti's elections at the 60th session of the UN General Assembly in September 2005, stating "We call upon the world not to leave Haiti alone and isolated; this way, on 7 February 2006, I will be able to hand over power to a newly and freely elected President and place Haiti, once and for all, within the community of democratic nations." Alexandre left office on 14 May 2006, when René Préval, winner of the presidential election, was sworn in as president.

== Later career ==
After stepping down as president, Alexandre taught law courses across Haiti. In October 2020 he became the head of the Independent Advisory Committee under President Jovenel Moïse to work on drafting a new constitution. During his time in office, he had considered the presidency to have a secondary role to the prime minister, but his view later changed. The draft that he proposed to acting Prime Minister Ariel Henry on 8 September 2021 became controversial. Alexandre stopped teaching due to the increasing violence during the gang war in Haiti, which caused him to stay at his home.

== Death ==
Boniface Alexandre died at his home in Port-au-Prince, on 4 August 2023, four days after his 87th birthday. Acting prime minister Ariel Henry called him "a great servant of the state, a brilliant lawyer and jurist, an eminent professor of civil law and civil procedure." Josué Pierre-Louis, secretary-general of the presidency, said that Alexandre had been "a true public servant having devoted more than half a century of his life to the judiciary and the teaching of civil law in Haiti." His funeral was held on 14 August at the Haitian Supreme Court, and was attended by its president, Jean Joseph Lebrun, along with other officials.

== See also ==
- 2004 Haitian coup d'état
- Politics of Haïti

Legal offices
Preceded by Clausel Débrosse	President of the Supreme Court of Haiti; 2002–2004	Succeeded by Georges Moïse
Political offices
Preceded by Jean-Bertrand Aristide	President of Haiti; 2004–2006	Succeeded by René Préval
