= Second Chance for Ex-Offenders Act of 2009 =

Proposed federal law

The Second Chance for Ex-Offenders Act of 2009 is a proposed federal law introduced to the United States House of Representatives Charles B. Rangel as H.R. 1529. This bill seeks to:

- Amends the federal criminal code to allow an individual to file a petition for expungement of a record of conviction for a nonviolent criminal offense if such individual has: (1) never been convicted of a violent offense and has never been convicted of a nonviolent offense other than the one for which expungement is sought; (2) fulfilled all requirements of the sentence of the court in which conviction was obtained; (3) remained free from dependency on or abuse of alcohol or a controlled substance for a minimum of one year and has been rehabilitated, to the court's satisfaction, if so required by the terms of supervised release; (4) obtained a high school diploma or completed a high school equivalency program; and (5) completed at least one year of community service.
- Authorizes an individual convicted of a felony or a misdemeanor to file an expungement petition and directs the court, in ruling on such petition, after determining petitioner eligibility, to weigh the petitioner's interests against the best interests of justice and public safety.
- Authorizes the United States Department of Justice to maintain a nonpublic manual or computerized index of expunged records, to be made available only to federal and state law enforcement personnel who have custody of such records for limited disclosure purposes.
- Requires the restoration of expunged records of individuals subsequently convicted of any federal or state offense.

On March 16, 2009, the bill was referred to the House Committee on the Judiciary.
