= United Nations Security Council Resolution 1529 =

UN Security Council Resolution 1529
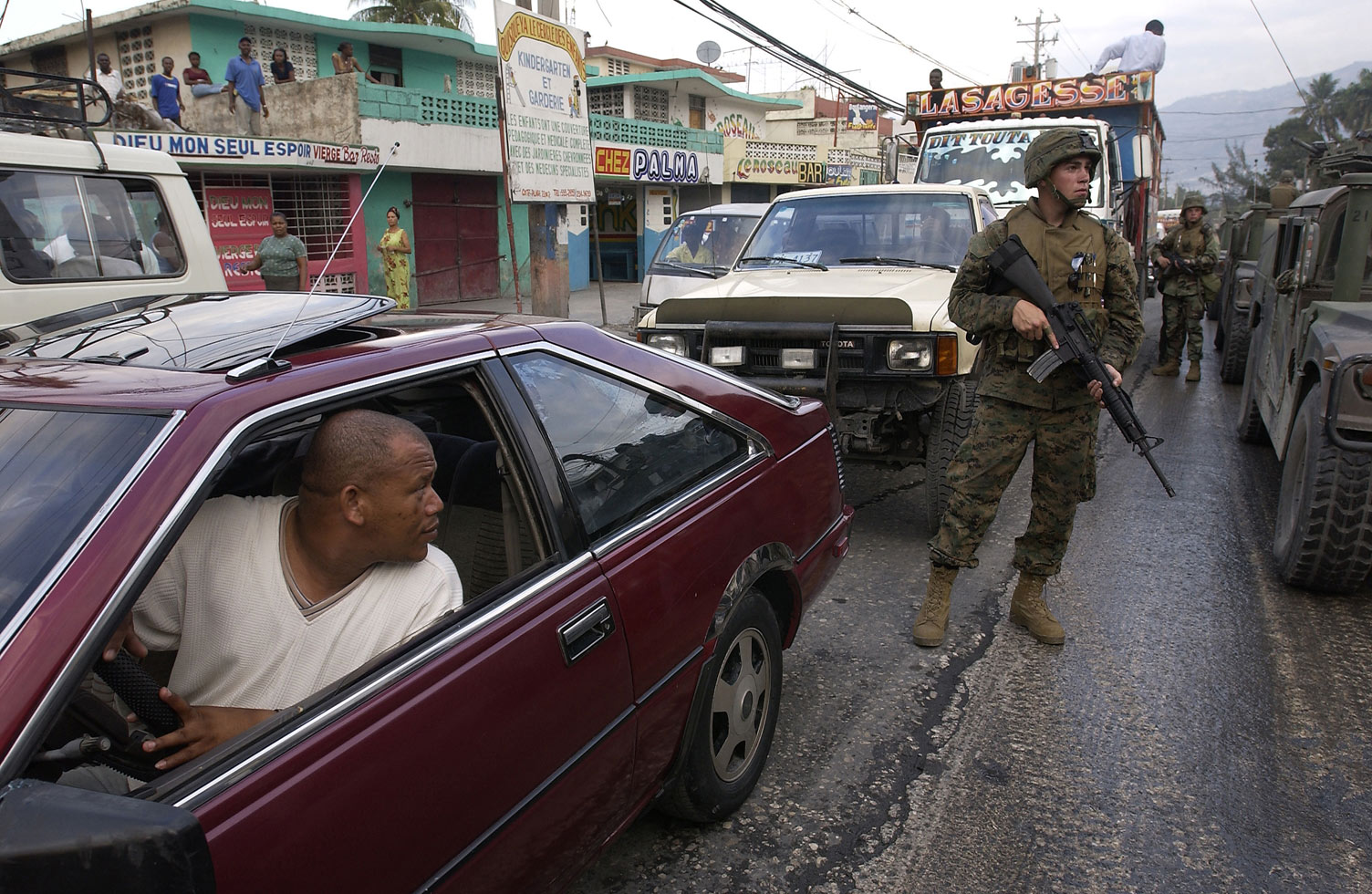
- Haitian capital Port-au-Prince (2004)
- Date: 29 February 2004
- Meeting no.: 4,919
- Code: S/RES/1529 (Document)
- Subject: The situation in Haiti
- Voting summary: 15 voted for; None voted against; None abstained
- Result: Adopted

Security Council composition
- Permanent members: China; France; Russia; United Kingdom; United States
- Non-permanent members: Algeria; Angola; Benin; Brazil; Chile; Germany; Pakistan; Philippines; Romania; Spain

United Nations Security Council Resolution 1529, adopted unanimously on 29 February 2004, after expressing concern about the situation in Haiti, the council authorised the deployment of an international force to the country to stabilise the situation following a coup d'état that resulted in the removal of President Jean-Bertrand Aristide from office.

== Resolution ==
=== Observations ===
The Security Council expressed concern at the deteriorating humanitarian situation in Haiti and ongoing violence, and stressed the need for the creation of a secure environment with respect for human rights. It praised the Organization of American States (OAS) and Caribbean Community (CARICOM) for their efforts to find a peaceful solution and noted the resignation of Jean-Bertrand Aristide and swearing-in of Boniface Alexandre as acting president. Haiti had appealed for international support to restore peace and stability in order to end the rebellion, which the council determined to be a threat to international peace and security.

=== Acts ===
Acting under Chapter VII of the United Nations Charter, the council asked the international community to support the political process in Haiti. It authorised the deployment of a multinational force for no more than three months to create a stable environment in the country; facilitate the provision of humanitarian assistance; facilitate international assistance to the Haitian National Police and coastguard and to establish conditions for international organisations to function. The Secretary-General Kofi Annan, who had appointed a Special Representative for Haiti, was asked to prepare plans for a stabilisation force to follow on from the international force.

All member states were required to contribute towards the multinational force and to take all necessary measures to fulfil its mandate. Meanwhile, parties to the conflict in Haiti were urged to end the violence and respect international law and the political succession in the country. The parties were also asked to co-operate with the international force, ensuring its safety and freedom of movement. The council also requested regular reports from the multinational force on the implementation of its mandate.

The resolution concluded by asking the international community to support the long-term development of Haiti.

== See also ==
- 2004 Haitian coup d'état
- List of United Nations Security Council Resolutions 1501 to 1600 (2003–2005)
- United Nations Stabilization Mission in Haiti
- Operation Secure Tomorrow
