= Suzanne Simone Baptiste Louverture =

French politician

Suzanne Simone Baptiste Louverture (c. 1742 – May 19, 1816) was the second wife of Toussaint Louverture and the "Dame-Consort" of the French colony of Saint-Domingue.

== Family life ==
After being a coachman and a driver, Toussaint was freed at the age of thirty-three, and then married Suzanne Simone Baptiste. Together, they had two biological sons, Isaac (1782–1854) and Saint-Jean Toussaint (1791–1804). She had a prior son, Placide (1781–1841, with Seraphim Le Clerc, a man of mixed-race descent), who Toussaint adopted.

== Politics ==
When in 1801 the constitution appointed Toussaint as governor of Saint-Domingue, she received the title of "Dame-Consort."

== Kidnapping ==
In 1802, Charles Leclerc's troops captured her along with her husband and the rest of her immediate family. The family was transported to Bayonne, where they were placed under the supervision of General Ducos. Under one account, Louverture was tortured and mutilated by French soldiers who unsuccessfully sought information about her husband. Despite the torture, Madame Louverture survived her husband, who died that same year, and her youngest child Saint-Jean, died in 1804 in Agen, France. She remained in France for the rest of her life, surviving the Napoleonic Wars which eventually overthrew Napoleon, who ordered her family's exile, and twice restored the Bourbon monarchy in France.

Suzanne died in 1816 in Agen, in the arms of her sons, Placide and Isaac. Her remains were buried next to Saint-Jean Toussaint, but both were moved to an unmarked grave nearby while the original gravesite was replaced by a train station.

== See also ==
- Haitian Revolution
- Marie-Claire Heureuse Félicité
- Marie-Louise Coidavid
