= Émile Jonassaint =

Haitian jurist and politician (1913–1995)

Provisional President of Haiti
- In office May 12, 1994 – October 12, 1994
- Prime Minister: Robert Malval
- Preceded by: Jean-Bertrand Aristide
- Succeeded by: Jean-Bertrand Aristide

President of the Supreme Court of Haiti
- In office 1991 – 1993; Acting: 1993 – 1994

Personal details
- Born: May 20, 1913 Port-de-Paix, Haiti
- Died: October 24, 1995 (aged 82) Port-au-Prince, Haiti
- Spouse: Marie-Thérèse Audette Jean
- Profession: Jurist

Émile Jonassaint (French pronunciation: [emil ʒɔnasɛ̃]; May 20, 1913 – October 24, 1995) was a Haitian jurist who served as the president of the Supreme Court of Haiti from 1991 to 1993 and in 1994. He was installed as the provisional president of Haiti in 1994 by a military government.

== Biography ==
Jonassaint served as head of the provisional government of Haiti for five months (May 12 and October 12) in 1994 after the military regime had forced Jean-Bertrand Aristide, the elected president, out of the country in 1991. Under the Haitian Constitution of 1987. If, for whatever reason, the president cannot discharge of his duties, his authority will be vested unto the Cabinet presided over by the prime minister.

The prime minister at the time, Rene Preval, had left the country following a request by the Parliament that he come to their chambers to answer allegations of fraud and abuses of power, among other things. Parliamentary leaders had intended to hold a vote of no confidence in respect of the prime minister. Instead of appearing in front of the Parliament, the prime minister defied the third branch and its power and his friend, President Aristide, usurping the powers not delegated to the executive branch or him under the Constitution. Preval went to the Parliamentary chambers and threatened the parliamentary leaders. Some were beaten by his supporters, had their houses ransacked, and had their lives threatened.

Military leaders arrested the president and deported him to Venezuela. As a result, Article 148 of the Constitution could not be enforced, and under Article 149, a Provisional government was formed with a senior member of the Cour de Cassation. In May, the United Nations Security Council called for all necessary means to be taken for the return of elected President Jean-Bertrand Aristide to power -- (Resolution 917). Approximately 100 UN monitors went to the Dominican Republic–Haiti border in mid-August to stop oil smuggling, which was sustaining the Haitian military leaders.

In response, Émile Jonassaint declared a state of siege and accused the world of having "declared war on poor Haiti, which has harmed nobody." Throughout August, the army and its paramilitary ally, the 'Front for the Advancement and Progress of Haiti,' continued to presumably murder some Aristide supporters while organizing parades of "volunteers" to fight an invasion.

On September 18, 1994 Dr. Robert S. Westcott received an invitation from President Jonassaint for an American mission of fact including former president Jimmy Carter, former chairman of the Joint Chiefs of Staff Gen. Colin Powell, Sen. Sam Nunn, and 3 others to negotiate the return of President Jean-Bertrand Aristide with Emile Jonassaint, Head of the Provisional Government in Haiti. Emile Jonassaint signed what is known as the Port-au-Prince Accord and step down as Head of the Provisional Government of Haiti upon the return of the elected president. On October 24, 1995, Jonassaint died at the age of 82.

Political offices
Preceded by Jean-Bertrand Aristide	President of Haiti; 1994	Succeeded by Jean-Bertrand Aristide
