= Franck Sylvain =

President of Haiti (1909–1987)

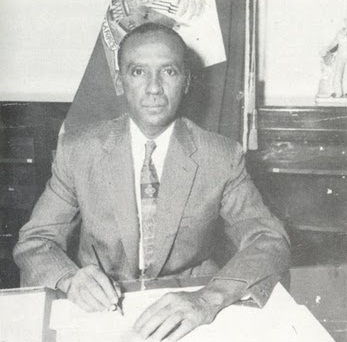

President of Haiti (Acting)
- In office February 7, 1957 – April 2, 1957
- Preceded by: Joseph Nemours Pierre-Louis
- Succeeded by: Daniel Fignolé

Personal details
- Born: August 3, 1909 Grand-Goâve, Haiti
- Died: January 3, 1987 (aged 77) Port-au-Prince, Haiti
- Party: Movement for the Organization of the Country
- Other political affiliations: Rally for the Haitian people
- Spouse: Dieudonne Auxilus Occide Jeanty
- Profession: Lawyer

Franck Sylvain (French pronunciation: [fʁɑ̃k silvɛ̃]; August 3, 1909 – January 3, 1987) was a Haitian politician. He served as acting President of Haiti in 1957.

== Biography ==
Sylvain was born on 3 August 1909 in Grand-Goâve, Haiti. Before his political career, he received a law degree and worked as a lawyer. In 1934, he was the founder of the anti-Communist newspaper "The Crusade" (La Croisade). He also was a founder of the "Rally for the Haitian people" (Rassemblement du Peuple Haïtien), a clandestine party. During the rule of Paul Magloire from 1950 to 1956 he was judge and gained a good reputation, having expressed an opinion in a proceeding against a close friend of the president.

On 7 February 1957, he was appointed by Parliament as the successor of Joseph Nemours Pierre-Louis, Haiti's interim president. Sylvain served as president for only 56 days, then he was deposed by General Léon Cantave.

After his presidency, he wrote his memoirs, called The 56 Days of Franck Sylvain (Les 56 jours de Franck Sylvain). He died in Port-au-Prince on 3 January 1987.
