= Michel Oreste =

President of Haiti (1859–1918)

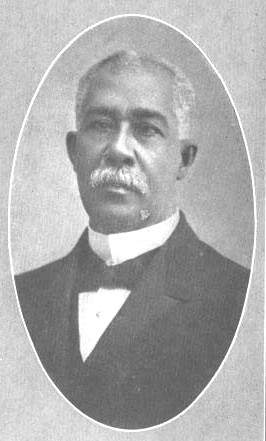

21st President of Haiti
- In office May 4, 1913 – January 27, 1914
- Preceded by: Tancrède Auguste
- Succeeded by: Oreste Zamor

Senator for the Ouest department
- In office May 17, 1912 – May 4, 1913

Member of the Provisional Government of Haiti
- In office May 14, 1902 – May 26, 1902

Personal details
- Born: Michel Oreste-Lafontant; April 8, 1859 Jacmel, Haiti
- Died: October 28, 1918 (aged 59) New York City, United States
- Party: Conservative Party
- Spouse: Alice Euchariste Pommeyrac
- Occupation: Lawyer

Michel Oreste Lafontant (April 8, 1859 – October 28, 1918) served as president of Haiti from May 1913 to January 1914. A lawyer and legislator, he was the first civilian elected to the office. A reformist, he faced opposition from forces loyal to landowner elites such as his successor Oreste Zamor, and stepped down on 27 January. He died in exile in New York City on 28 October 1918.

Political offices
Preceded by Tancrède Auguste	President of Haiti; May 1913 – January 1914	Succeeded by Oreste Zamor
