= Supreme Court of Haiti =

Highest court in the Haitian legal system

- Cour de Cassation
- Established: 1817
- Jurisdiction: Haiti
- Location: Port-au-Prince
- Authorised by: Constitution of Haiti

President of the Supreme Court of Justice
- Currently: Jean Joseph Lebrun
- Since: 22 November 2022

The Supreme Court of Haiti (French: Cour de Cassation, pronounced [kuʁ də kasɑsjɔ̃]; Haitian Creole: Lakou kasasyon an Ayiti) is the highest court in the Haitian legal system. The Supreme Court building is located in Port-au-Prince.

== History ==
From 1806 to 1817, the Senate of Haiti served judicial functions. The Supreme Court was first formed in 1817 under Petion's 1816 constitution as a body of a grand judge, dean, six judges and a government commissioner, all of whom were to be appointed for life. The first Grand Judge of the Supreme Court was André Dominique Sabourin, who concurrently served as Minister of Justice in Petion's cabinet. Other appointees to the court were:

- Louis Germain Linard, dean
- Jacques Ignace Fresnel
- Jean Thézan,
- Jean-François Lespinasse,
- Thomas Gédeon Christ (who was sworn in later),
- Lemerand
- Pitre Jeune
- Louis-Gabriel Audigé, Government Commissioner

Jules Solime Milscent was also appointed as the first clerk.

The Law of 16 July 1954 added a Judge to the eleven provided by the Law of 1918 and since then, the Court of Cassation of Haiti is composed of twelve Judges (including the President and Vice-President), a Government Commissioner, and three substitutes.

== Composition ==
The Constitution of Haiti stipulates that Supreme Court justices are appointed for 10-year terms by the president from a list submitted by the senate of three persons per court seat. Historically the court has frequently reversed its own opinions and its justices have often been replaced. Almost all new governments have a Supreme Court of their own choosing. For example, in February 2021, President Jovenel Moise declared judges, Joseph Mécène Jean-Louis, Yvickel Dabrezil, and Wendelle Coq Thelot retired after the opposition had tried to replace Moises with Jean-Louis as president.

== Role ==
The Supreme Court of Haiti interprets and expounds all congressional enactments brought to it in cases, and as such it interprets state law. It also has superseding power over all courts to examine departmental and federal statutes and executive actions, determining whether they conform to the country's Constitution. The Labor Courts and the Land Court are only appealable to the Supreme Court, as opposed to the Juvenile Court and the High Court of Accounts.

If the constitutionality of a law, statute, or an executive action is ruled against by the Supreme Court, its decision can be overcome if the Constitution is amended by the people parliaments or if the Court overrules itself. Decisions by the Court do not pertain to specific cases, rather are intended to encompass interpretation of legislature and executive authority, actually developing the way laws are interpreted. The Cour de Cassation therefore potentially yields the highest power in the Haiti governmental system.

Under the 1987 constitution, the line of succession to the office of President of Haiti went first to the president of the Supreme Court, then to the vice-president of the court, then to judges in order of seniority. An election for president was required within three months and the acting president could not run for the office. This was amended in 2011–2012 to remove all judges from the presidential line of succession.

== Palais de Justice ==
The Palais de Justice (the Supreme Court building) was heavily damaged and partially collapsed as a result of the 2010 Haiti earthquake.

== Chief Justices of the Supreme Court ==
Chief Justice	Took office	Left office	Notes
Joseph Nemours Pierre-Louis	1946	1957	
Lélio Vilgrain	1957	1957	
Colbert Bonhomme	1957	1958	
Théodore Nicoleau	1958	1961	
Adrien Douyon	1961	1963-?	
Luc Boisvert	?	?	
Fournier Fortuné	?-1980	1982	
Rock Raymond	1982	1985	
Pierre Gonzalès	1985	1985	
Luc D. Hector	1985	1987-?	
Pierre L. Jeannot	?	1989	
Gilbert Austin	1989	1990-?	
Ertha Pascal-Trouillot [provisional]	1990	1991	
Joseph Nérette	?	1991	
Émile Jonassaint	1991	1993	
Clausel Débrosse	1994	2000	
Boniface Alexandre	2001	2006	
Georges Moïse	2006	2011	
Anel Alexis Joseph	2011	2015	
Jules Cantave	2015	2019	
René Sylvestre	2019	2021	
Jean Joseph Lebrun	2022	current	

== Current members ==
- Jean Joseph Lebrun, President (since 2022)
- Jean-Claude Théogène, vice-president (since 2019)
- Barthélemy Anténor (since 2019)
- Jean-Joseph Lebrun (since 2019)
