= Ganthier =

Ganthier Gantye
- Commune
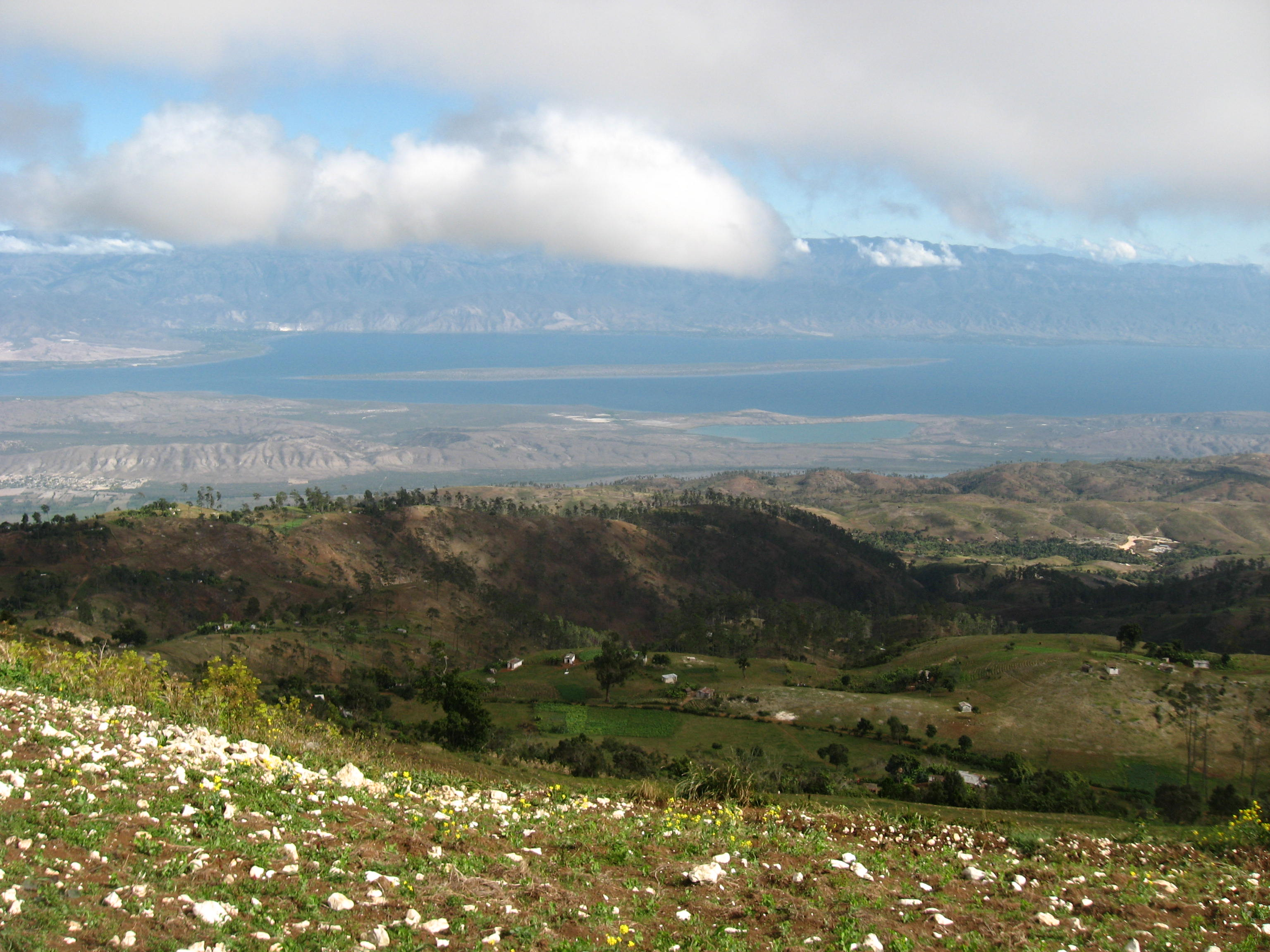

- Location in Haiti
- Coordinates: 18°32′0″N 72°4′0″W
- Country: Haiti
- Department: Ouest
- Arrondissement: Croix-des-Bouquets

Area
  - Total: 493.7 km^{2} (190.6 sq mi)
- Elevation: 142 m (466 ft)

Population (7 August 2003)
  - Total: 71,261
  - Density: 144.3/km^{2} (374/sq mi)
- Time zone: UTC-05:00 (EST)
  - Summer (DST): UTC-04:00 (EDT)

Ganthier (French pronunciation: [ɡɑ̃tje]; Haitian Creole: Gantye) is a commune in the Croix-des-Bouquets Arrondissement, in the Ouest department of Haiti. It has 71,261 inhabitants.
