= François C. Antoine Simon =

President of Haiti from 1908 to 1911

Antoine Simon
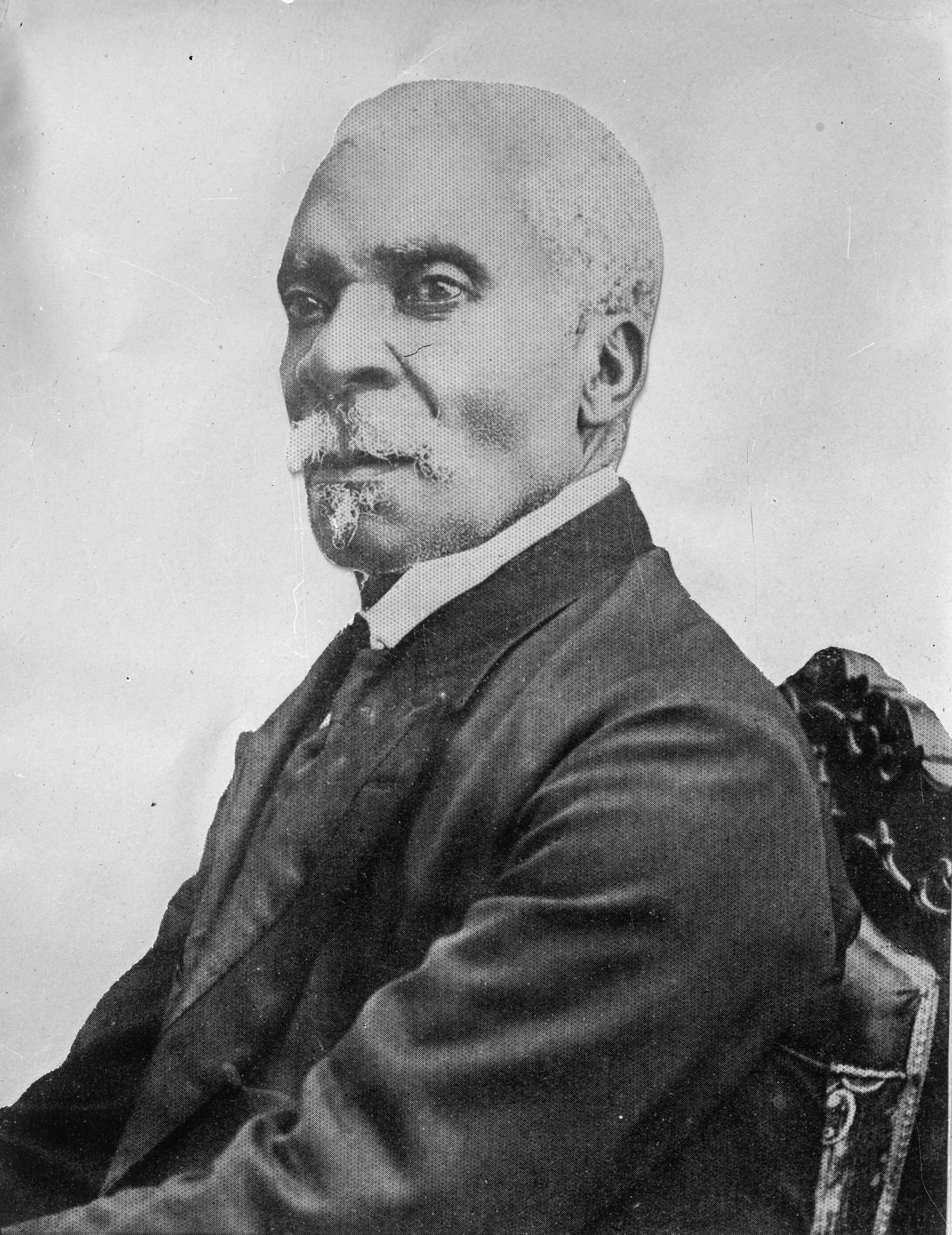

18th President of Haiti
- In office December 6, 1908 – August 2, 1911
- Preceded by: Pierre Nord Alexis
- Succeeded by: Cincinnatus Leconte

Personal details
- Born: October 10, 1843 Les Cayes, Haiti
- Died: March 10, 1923 (aged 79) Les Cayes, Haiti
- Party: Liberal Party
- Spouse: Uranie Adélaïde Mentor
- Profession: Military (divisional general)

François C. Antoine Simon (a.k.a. Antoine Simon) (French pronunciation: [fʁɑ̃swa se ɑ̃twan simɔ̃]; October 10, 1843 – March 10, 1923) was President of Haiti from 6 December 1908 to 2 August 1911. He led a rebellion against Pierre Nord Alexis and succeeded him as president.

== Biography ==
Francois C. Antoine Simon was born on 10 October 1843 in Les Cayes, Haiti, and died either on 10 January or 10 March 1923 in Les Cayes. He was originally from the town of Savane near Les Cayes and initially worked as a municipal police officer before joining the army as an officer.

In 1883, he was appointed commander of the troops in Sud, a post he held until 1908. During his military career, he was promoted to colonel in 1887. Between 1896 and 1902, He was aide-de-camp of the President Tirésias Simon Sam and was later promoted to general. It was as a general that he led a military revolt against President Pierre Nord Alexis.

== Presidency 1908–1911 ==
On 6 December 1908, he was appointed successor to President Alexis. Although he had little formal education himself, he assembled an advisory group consisting of influential men. On 19 December 1908 he announced his six-member cabinet and took the oath of office before Senator Paulin.

One of his first policy decisions was to pursue an appeasement policy allowing exiled Haitians to return. This set the stage for some stability during the early years of his mandate. President Simon strove constantly to improve agricultural production. He also had the intention of building a nationwide railway network. To accomplish this required several contracts with American companies, including the so-called "MacDonald Contract" – a contract to build a railway line between Port-au-Prince and Cap-Haïtien. Embedded in these negotiations was the cultivation and export of sugar and bananas by the Haitian American Sugar Company. However, these contracts were poorly prepared, leading to criticism from intellectuals and politicians alike. On the other hand, the contracts led directly to the paving of streets and electrification of Port-au-Prince. As a result of the modern roads, there was an increase in the presence of cars in Haiti.

To satisfy American banana plantations, Haitian companies were taxed, resulting in unrest by small landowners who ultimately paid the price. Small farmers in the north (Cacos) then began to revolt in June 1911. General Cincinnatus Leconte, a former Minister of Public Works and Agriculture under Simon Sam, took advantage of the situation to lead a coup d'état against Simon.

Leconte's initial campaign failed, but a subsequent attempt in August 1911 succeeded in the capture of Port-au-Prince. Simon was ousted from power by supporters of Leconte, who was his successor as President. Simon went into exile for several years, but returned to Haiti where he died in Les Cayes.

In Tell My Horse, Zora Neale Hurston recounts the elaborate Catholic funeral Simon gave to his pet goat Simalo upon the goat's death.

== Family ==
His ancestors are Pierre Baptiste Simon, Toussaint Louverture. One of President A. Simon’s daughter Anézulia Simon married Sergeant Lubencius Lubin whose children are: Antoine Lubin, Thérese Lubin, Darius Lubin, Alexandre Lubin, Damien Lubin, Claire Lubin; Ulysses Ilemond Simon, Dominique Bienvil Simon and Celestina was a voodoo priestess, Antoine Simon Jeune (Antoinier) whose children with his wife Sanite Augustin are: Max, Alex, Amede, Cecile. A grandson named Charite Simon, and his great-grandchildren Romane Antoine Simon, James Simon, Sintilma Simon, Kettelie Simon, Fred Simon, Franck Simon, Esther Simon, Sylvie Simon, Emmanuella Simon, Cherlin Simon. He also had 2 great-great-grandsons named Marcel Simon and Sean Valere

Political offices
Preceded by Pierre Nord Alexis	President of Haïti; 1908–1911	Succeeded by Cincinnatus Leconte
