= Joseph Nemours Pierre-Louis =

Acting President of Haiti from 1956 to 1957

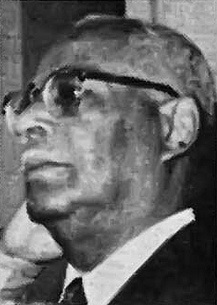

President of Haiti (Acting)
- In office December 12, 1956 – February 3, 1957
- Preceded by: Paul Magloire
- Succeeded by: Franck Sylvain

Minister of Justice and Worship
- In office November 29, 1937 – September 15, 1938
- President: Sténio Vincent
- Preceded by: Odilon Charles
- Succeeded by: Luc Prophète

Personal details
- Born: October 24, 1900 Cap-Haïtien, Haiti
- Died: April 23, 1966 (aged 65) Port-au-Prince, Haiti
- Party: Conservative Party
- Profession: Lawyer

Joseph Nemours Pierre-Louis (French pronunciation: [ʒozɛf nəmuʁ pjɛʁ lwi]; October 24, 1900 – April 23, 1966) served as acting President of Haiti from 1956 to 1957.

Pierre-Louis, who studied physics and law, was first a professor of physics at the Lycée Philippe Guerrier. After working as a law professor from 1928 to 1937, he became a judge of the Municipal Court of Cap-Haïtien. He became president of the Supreme Court of Haiti after the revolution of January 1946, a post he held until his election to the Senate.

After the departure of Paul Magloire in December 1956, Pierre-Louis announced in a radio address on 12 December 1956 that under the Constitution he became interim president of Haiti. He also announced elections for April 1957 and ordered the release of former presidential candidate and wealthy plantation owner Louis Déjoie and other political prisoners. In early January 1957, he seized the assets of former President Paul Magloire. Pierre-Louis was Acting President from 12 December 1956 to 3 February 1957. He was replaced by Franck Sylvain, who became acting president on 7 February 1957.

Political offices
Preceded by Paul Magloire	President of Haïti; 1956–1957	Succeeded by Franck Sylvain
