= Pierre Nord Alexis =

President of Haiti from 1902 to 1908

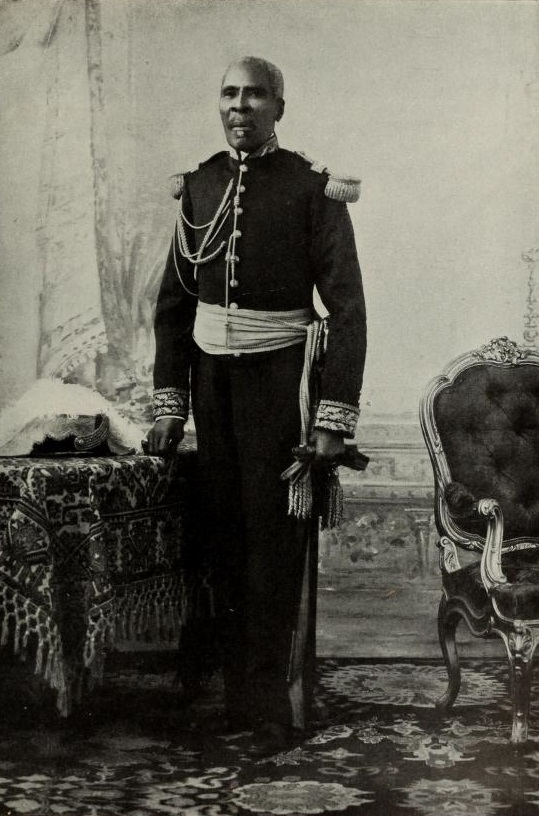

19th President of Haiti
- In office 17 December 1902 – 2 December 1908
- Preceded by: Pierre Théoma Boisrond-Canal (acting)
- Succeeded by: Commission for Public Order (Note: Louis-Auguste Boisrond-Canal, Prudent, Grandjean Guillaume, Maximilien Laforest, Michel Oreste and Auguste Bonamy.)

Minister of War and Navy
- In office 20 May – 21 December 1902
- President: Pierre Théoma Boisrond-Canal
- Preceded by: Vilbrun Guillaume Sam
- Succeeded by: Cyriaque Célestin

Minister of Interior
- In office 23 August – 29 October 1889
- President: Florvil Hyppolite
- Preceded by: Maximillien Momplaisir
- Succeeded by: Saint-Martin Dupuy

Personal details
- Born: 2 August 1820 Cap-Henri, Haiti
- Died: 1 May 1910 (aged 89) Kingston, Jamaica
- Spouse: Célestina Pierrot

Military service
- Branch/service: Haitian Army
- Years of service: 1839–1908
- Rank: General
- Commands: Commander-in-Chief of the North

Pierre Nord Alexis (French pronunciation: [pjɛʁ nɔʁ alɛksi]; 2 August 1820 – 1 May 1910) was a Haitian general and politician who served as president of Haiti from 1902 to 1908.

Alexis was born in Cap-Haïtien. He was descended from nobility in Henri Christophe's Kingdom of Haiti, and joined the Haitian Army at the age of 19. He quickly rose through the ranks and eventually become the commander-in-chief of northern Haiti. Alexis had a role in Haiti's political turmoil over the next three decades. He spent time in exile abroad more than once, served in the provisional government after the fall of Sylvain Salnave, from 1869 to 1870, and became minister of the interior during the presidency of Florvil Hyppolite in 1889.

== Early life and career ==
Pierre Nord Alexis was born on 2 August 1820 in Cap-Haïtien, which at the time was part of Henri Christophe's Kingdom of Haiti. His father had been made a nobleman by Christophe in Cap-Haïtien, and during his youth, he explored the ruins of Citadelle Laferrière. He attended a school organized by French priests until he was 19, when he joined the Haitian Army. Alexis was quickly promoted through the military hierarchy, and led a movement in 1843 to amend the constitution of Haiti. Afterwards, he left military service for two years to study philosophy in Port-au-Prince, and became a supporter of republicanism, before returning to northern Haiti. By 1865 he was a general who had been appointed as commander-in-chief of northern Haiti. He had married the daughter of Jean-Louis Pierrot, a niece of Henri Christophe.

== Political career ==
In 1865, Alexis supported Sylvain Salnave's unsuccessful rebellion against President Fabre Geffrard. After Salnave seized power and became president on 14 June 1867, he appointed Alexis as commander-in-chief in the north. During the summer and fall of 1867, Alexis led a pacification campaign in remote mountain villages of northern Haiti against peasant rebels known as Cacos, who opposed Salnave. Many of the villages were retaken, and Mont-Organisé, the center of the rebellion, put under pressure. However, when a column of his troops was wiped out by rebels in January 1868, Salnave blamed Alexis for the loss and exiled him to Turks Island. After Jean-Nicolas Nissage Saget began a rebellion against Salnave and proclaimed himself the head of a Republic of the North, Alexis returned from exile and joined him. By early 1869 Haiti was divided between Nissage Saget's Republic of the North at Saint-Marc, supported by Alexis; the State of the South at Les Cayes; and the Republic of Haiti proper, led by Salnave at Port-au-Prince.

After Salnave's defeat in the civil war (the Guerre de Salnave or Guerre des Cacos), a provisional government was founded on 27 December 1869 to restore constitutional rule. It included Alexis, Jean-Nicolas Nissage Saget, and Michel Domingue. They formed an agreement to divide the next presidential terms between themselves, beginning with Nissage Saget, and followed by Domingue and Alexis. The provisional government was replaced on 20 March 1870, when Nissage Saget was elected president by the National Assembly of Haiti. In the ensuing years, he had a tumultuous career: he was exiled in 1874 but was allowed to return to Haiti a few years later by President Pierre Théoma Boisrond-Canal. During the presidency of Lysius Salomon, he was a vocal leader of the opposition, enduring several jail sentences before Salomon was finally ousted in a revolt. The new president, Florvil Hyppolite, gave him an important military position in the north, but when President Tirésias Simon Sam resigned, he joined Anténor Firmin in a march on Port-au-Prince in an effort to seize control of the government.

The new president, however, was his old ally, Boisrond-Canal, who had returned him from exile some twenty years earlier. Canal defused the tension by appointing Alexis Minister of War, driving a wedge between him and Firmin. Troops loyal to Firmin were finally defeated in Port-au-Prince, leaving only two strongholds, Saint-Marc and Gonaïves, opposed to the new government of Canal and Alexis. Alexis took advantage of the situation by negotiating with the United States and declaring himself in support of American interests in the Caribbean. The U.S. responded by imposing a naval blockade on the two centers still loyal to Firmin, paving the way for Alexis to seize control of the government for himself. On June 28, 1902 there was a street battle in Cap-Haitien between the Firmin and Alexis partisans. During the firminist revolt in 1902 he gave Eugene Francois Magloire the defense of Fort Belair in Cap-Haitien. He made him a spy during the Civil War.

=== Presidency ===
He was elected president of Haiti by the National Assembly, with 100 votes out of 115, and took the oath of office on 21 December 1902. At the age of 82, he became President on 21 December 1902 by leading troops loyal to him into the country's Chamber of Deputies. Alexis managed to hold on to power for the next six years, though his regime was plagued by rebellion. In 1903, he proclaimed Eugène Francois Magloire Commandant of Grande-Rivière du Nord, General of division of the republic and his honorary aide-de-camp. During his presidency, he took to justice all statesmen accused of corruption in 1904: " le procès de la consolidation". All who stole the state's money were judged and condemned. In January 1908, Alexis, already in his eighties, decided to have himself proclaimed President for Life. This reunited the supporters of Firmin, who launched a new revolt against Alexis. While the revolt was crushed, it exacerbated the country's existing economic problems. A famine in the south that same year led to violent food riots and a new rebellion, this time from the south, led by General François Antoine Simon. On the night of March 14, 1908 he got more than 20 firminists who were trying to overthrow him executed in front of the Cemetery of Port-au-Prince; Massillon Coicou was part of those executed firminists.

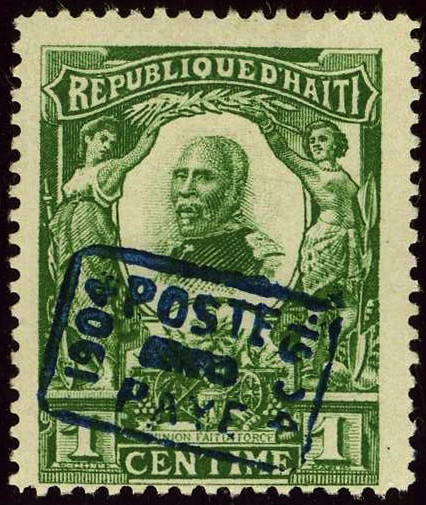
Nord Alexis on a 1904 stamp

== Exile ==
Ousted from power on 2 December 1908, Alexis went into exile in Jamaica and later relocated to New Orleans with his family, where he died on 1 May 1910. He is buried in St. Louis Cemetery #2 in New Orleans.

== Family ==
Alexis was married to Princess Marie-Louise-Amelie-Celestina Pierrot, daughter of President Jean-Louis Pierrot (a general and later Prince under Henri I). From this marriage, he had a son who bore the name of Henri Nord Alexis, also known as Henri Alexis. His great-great-grandson Jacques-Édouard Alexis was Prime Minister of Haiti twice: from 1999 to 2001 and from 2006 to 2008.

== Bibliography ==
- Heinl, Robert Debs; Heinl, Nancy Gordon (1996). Written in Blood: The Story of the Haitian People, 1492–1995. University Press of America.
- Marshall, Harriet Gibbs (1930). The Story of Haiti: From the Discovery of the Island by Christopher Columbus to the Present Day. Boston, USA: The Christopher Publishing House.

Political offices
Preceded by Pierre Théoma Boisrond-Canal; Acting	President of Haiti; 1902–1908	Succeeded by Commission for Public Order
