= Jane Dentinger =

American novelist

Jane Dentinger (born September 9, 1951) is an American mystery writer and former actress.

A graduate of Ithaca College with a degree in acting and directing, Dentinger moved to New York City, finding work as an actress both on Broadway and in regional theater. For a time she worked at the Murder Ink bookstore. Beginning in 2006 she was the editor in chief of the Mystery Guild. She is best known for the series of mysteries she wrote featuring Jocelyn "Josh" O'Roarke, an actress in New York City.

== Works ==
=== Novels ===
- Murder on Cue (1983)
- First Hit of the Season (1984)
- Death Mask (1988)
- Dead Pan (1992)
- The Queen is Dead (1994)
- Who Dropped Peter Pan? (1995)

=== Collections ===
- Murder, They Wrote (1997) (with Mary Daheim, Marjorie Eccles, Sally Gunning, Jean Hager, Ellen Hart, Kate Kingsbury, Janet Laurence, Marlys Millhiser, and Nancy Pickard)
