= Arnett-Fullen House =

- U.S. National Register of Historic Places
- Colorado State Register of Historic Properties
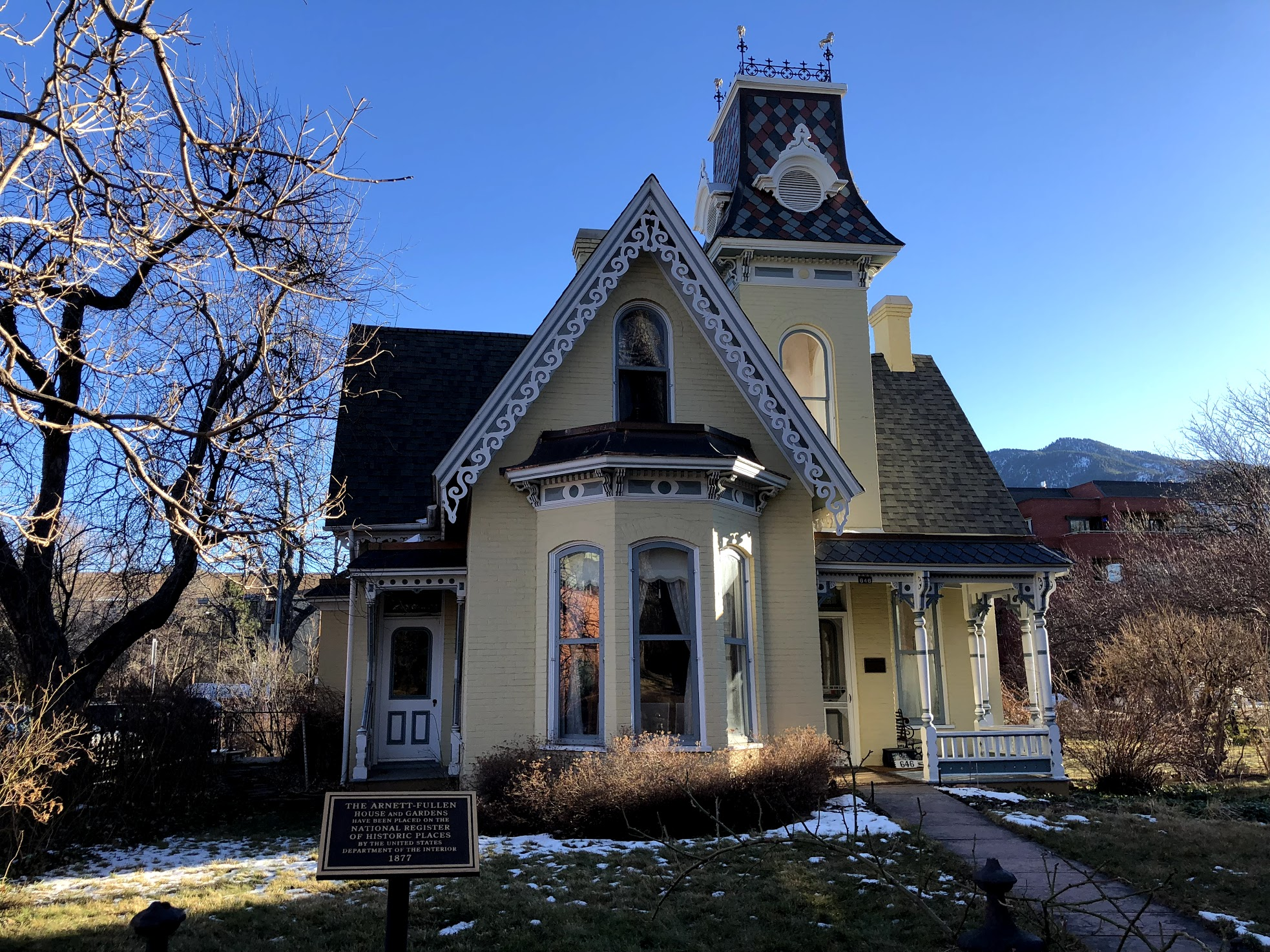

- Location within Colorado Location within the United States
- Location: 646 Pearl Street, Boulder County, Colorado, United States
- Coordinates: 40°00′58″N 105°17′12″W
- Architect: George E. King
- Architectural style: Mixed Style
- NRHP reference No.: 08001376
- CSRHP No.: 5BL.111
- Designated CSRHP: January 29, 2009

Arnett-Fullen House, also known as the Gingerbread House, is located at 646 Pearl Street in Boulder, Colorado and is on the list of the National Register of Historic Places listings in Boulder County, Colorado since 2009. This house features a mixture of architectural styles and is a two-story, private residence, which is sometimes open to the public.

== History ==
Construction of the house began in 1877 and was completed by 1882. Built by Willamette Arnett (1848–1901), heir to Anthony Arnett, one of the founders of the Boulder Land and Trust Company. Arnett-Fullen House featured one of Boulder's earliest indoor bathrooms, central heating, and cold running water systems. The St. Louis, Missouri-based architect, George E. King (1852–1912) designed the house. This house design features a mixture of architectural styles including Gothic Revival, Victorian, Carpenter Gothic, Second Empire, and Italianate styles and featuring farmhouse aesthetics and the use of cast iron throughout.

During the Klondike Gold Rush, Willamette Arnett died in Dawson City. After Arnett's death, the house was then sold. The house was acquired by Hiram Fullen and the Fullen family around 1914, after there were many stories of spirits in the house and hauntings.

Arnett-Fullen House was referenced as a model of a "gingerbread house" in the Marlys Millhiser horror novel, The Mirror (1978).

The house was purchased by Historic Boulder in 1994 for $329,000 and renovated for use as the organization's headquarters. In 2004, the group began exploring the idea of selling the property and it was eventually listed and sold in 2005 to a private party for $1,258,560.
