= Mary Daheim =

American mystery writer (1937–2022)

- Born: November 7, 1937; Seattle, Washington, U.S.
- Died: March 30, 2022 (aged 84)
- Occupation: Writer

Mary Rene Richardson Daheim (November 7, 1937 – March 30, 2022) was an American writer of romance and mystery novels.

== Life and career ==
Daheim was born in Seattle, Washington, United States, to Hugh and Monica Richardson. She attended the University of Washington where she was one of the first female editors of The Daily, the campus newspaper. After receiving her BA in communications, Daheim worked as a journalist in Anacortes and Port Angeles, Washington.

Daheim's first novel, the historical romance Love's Pirate, was published in 1983. Daheim continued writing historical romances for several years until she tired of writing "bodice-rippers". She switched genres to her personal favorite, mysteries.

The "Bed & Breakfast" series featuring amateur detective Judith McMonigle (later Flynn) was published beginning in 1991.

The first book in her "Alpine" series The Alpine Advocate was published in 1992. Emma Lord is the protagonist who tackles mysteries in the small town of Alpine, Washington. The real Alpine no longer exists; however in her series Daheim resurrects the town. Interest in the old town led to it being rediscovered in 2008 by a group calling themselves "The Alpine Advocates".

Daheim was nominated for an Agatha Award for her first mystery novel Just Desserts in 1991. In 2008, she was inducted into the University of Washington Department of Communications Alumni Hall of Fame.

Daheim died on March 30, 2022, at the age of 87.

== Bibliography ==
Daheim's published works:

=== Historical romances ===
- Love's Pirate (1983) - republished in 2013 as The Royal Mile
- Destiny's Pawn (1984)
- Pride's Captive (1986) - republished in 2013 as Reunion
- Passion's Triumph (1988) - republished in 2015 as Gosford's Daughter
- King's Ransom (1990)
- Improbable Eden (1991)
- Gypsy Baron (1992)

=== Mystery series ===
==== Bed & Breakfast series ====
1. Just Desserts (1991)
2. Fowl Prey (1991)
3. Holy Terrors (1992)
4. Dune to Death (1993)
5. Bantam of the Opera (1993)
6. A Fit of Tempera (1994)
7. Major Vices (1995)
8. Murder, My Suite (1996)
9. Auntie Mayhem (1996)
10. Nutty as a Fruitcake (1996)
11. September Mourn (1998)
12. Wed and Buried (1998)
13. Snow Place to Die (1998)
14. Legs Benedict (1998)
15. Creeps Suzette (2000)
16. A Streetcar Named Expire (2001)
17. Suture Self (2001)
18. Silver Scream (2002)
19. Hocus Croakus (2003)
20. This Old Souse (2004)
21. Dead Man Docking (2005)
22. Saks and Violins (2006)
23. Scots on the Rocks (2007)
24. Vi Agra Falls (2008)
25. Loco Motive (2010)
26. All The Pretty Hearses (2011)
27. The Wurst Is Yet to Come (2012)
28. Gone With the Win (2013)
29. Clam Wake (2014)
30. Here Comes the Bribe (2016)
31. A Case of Bier (2018)

B&B short stories in anthologies

- Tippy Canoe in Murder, They Wrote (1997) (also contains works by Jane Dentinger, Marjorie Eccles, Sally Gunning, Jean Hager, Ellen Hart, Kate Kingsbury, Janet Laurence, Marlys Millhiser, and Nancy Pickard)
- Dial M for Mom in Motherhood Is Murder (2003)
- The Ghost of Christmas Past in Sugar Plums & Scandal (2006)

==== Alpine series ====
1. The Alpine Advocate (1992)
2. The Alpine Betrayal (1993)
3. The Alpine Christmas (1993)
4. The Alpine Decoy (1994)
5. The Alpine Escape (1995)
6. The Alpine Fury (1996)
7. The Alpine Gamble (1996)
8. The Alpine Hero (1997)
9. The Alpine Icon (1998)
10. The Alpine Journey (1998)
11. The Alpine Kindred (1998)
12. The Alpine Legacy (1999)
13. The Alpine Menace (2000)
14. The Alpine Nemesis (2001)
15. The Alpine Obituary (2002)
16. The Alpine Pursuit (2004)
17. The Alpine Quilt (2005)
18. The Alpine Recluse (2006)
19. The Alpine Scandal (2007)
20. The Alpine Traitor (2008)
21. The Alpine Uproar (2009)
22. The Alpine Vengeance (2011)
23. The Alpine Winter (2011)
24. The Alpine Xanadu (2013)
25. The Alpine Yeoman (2014)
26. The Alpine Zen (2015)
27. Alpha Alpine (2017)
28. Bitter Alpine (2020)
