= Rotha (name) =

Rotha is a feminine given name and surname. It may refer to:

- Rotha Johnston (born 1959), Northern Irish entrepreneur
- Rotha Lintorn-Orman (1895–1935), founder of the British Fascisti, the first avowedly fascist movement in British politics
- Paul Rotha (1907–1984), British documentary film-maker, film historian and critic
- Wanda Rotha (1901–1982), Austrian stage actress
