= The Mirror (novel) =

1978 occult fantasy novel by Marlys Millhiser

- First edition (publ. G.P. Putnam's Sons)
- Author: Marlys Millhiser
- Language: English
- Publisher: G.P. Putnam's Sons
- Publication date: 1978
- ISBN: 0-399-12199-4 (first edition)
- Dewey Decimal: 813.54
- LC Class: PZ4.M6516 Ml

The Mirror is a 1978 occult fantasy novel by Marlys Millhiser, about unwilling time-travel involving an evil antique mirror with unclear glass. This was Millhiser's most popular novel, of her fourteen novels published. The historical Arnett-Fullen House in Boulder, Colorado was referenced as a model of a "gingerbread house" in the book.

== Plot synopsis ==
Shay Garrett's story, 1978 (and through time-travel, 1900–1924)

In 1978, 20-year-old Shay Garrett is preparing for her wedding to Marek Weir. Her mother, Rachael (Maddon) Garrett has a pre-wedding talk with her, advising her to pull out as she does not love Marek. Her father Jerry tells her he has unwrapped the mirror that fascinated her and placed it in her bedroom. Shay's 98-year-old grandmother Bran is brought into the living-room in a wheelchair — when she hears what Jerry says, she grabs Shay's wrist and utters a very surprised "mirror."

Shay goes into her bedroom and sees the mirror, an antique with claw feet, marred by a crack, and remembers that it only "fascinated" her due to being hideous. As Shay looks at herself in her wedding veil, giggling at the strange reflection and wondering what was said to Bran, she hears an exclamation of "no" and discovers its source to be Bran—who then utters the name "Corbin" after which the room spins and a vortex grabs Shay.

When Shay finally comes out of the vortex, she notices herself in the same room (but in an earlier version with a bare floor and baseboard rather than carpets and baseboard heater). Hearing a voice calling for "Brandy," she answers "just water, please" and is given water by a woman who resembles Rachael. Overnight, she realizes the name of her grandmother "Bran" is short for "Brandy." The next day, after surprising Brandy's family by taking a glass of milk (which Brandy did not like before) she is married to Corbin Strock. Shay is surprised: her mother Rachel's maiden name is Maddon, not Strock, and her grandmother's wedding photo shows her with a blond, mustached man as her husband — who looks nothing like Strock. Shay is further surprised when she sees the man from the photo on the roadside.

About a month later, Shay hears that John McCabe is dying; when she comes to the house, he tells his daughter to "forgive him." That night, she is once again "exchanged" and finds herself on the side of a highway near Boulder in 1978. Not knowing what is going on (and somewhat weak from the "exchange"), Shay searches for shelter; as she pulls up to a lighted trailer, she is once again "exchanged" into Brandy's body, this time permanently.

Shay's 1978 ways cause friction with both her husband and his mother, Thora K. She finds out the man on the road was actually Lon Maddon, the identical twin brother of Hutchison (Shay's grandfather). Contacting a "madam," May Bell Smith, Shay/Brandy attempts to work a form of birth control using a penny, but this fails when she conceives shortly before Corbin's death in a mining accident. Brandy delivers a daughter, whom she names Penny — and who dies before her first birthday.

Shay/Brandy eventually marries Hutchison and conceives a child. She surprises the Maddons with a prediction that she will bear identical twin boys — and further surprises them when she bears her uncles Remy and Dan. But she then tells Thora K. "I only knew them as uncles; what will I do when Rachael is born?".

Rachael Maddon's story, 1924-1958

Born when Brandy is 44 (her brothers are 13 years older), Rachael Maddon is born and raised middle-class. In 1931 during the Great Depression, a gangly boy asks for some of the candy she has purchased, and eats it in one sitting. When she introduces the boy to her mother, Brandy faints, as this is Shay's father Jerrold. Brandy soon goes to Jerry's home and meets Shay's other grandmother, who is nine years younger than herself. When Jerry asks Brandy to help him trace his grandmother Christine Pintor, Brandy soon determines from the clues that Christine is none other than May Bell Smith, the madam.

After her marriage to Jerry, Rachael decides to become a writer and is extremely busy, and also has difficulty conceiving. When she asks her mother, Brandy tells her she will have one child (and won't have time for more) in 1958. One day when Rachael arrives home, she is surprised to see Hutch lying on the floor with Brandy punching his chest and saying "it's been a long time since I've seen this done;" when the ambulance finally arrives, Hutch is declared dead. Brandy does not attend the funeral, stating that funerals remind her of "pink granite" which is exactly the color of Hutch's gravestone.

Brandy begins traveling extensively, hearing from abroad that Rachael has conceived. The day before the child is due, Brandy arrives at home in Boulder and poses defiantly in front of the mirror thinking she is "quite spry for 78 years"—then suffers a stroke at the same moment the mirror develops a large crack.

Brandy McCabe's story, 1900 (time-travelled to 1978)

In 1900, 20-year-old Brandy McCabe argues with her rich father John about the visions she has seen in the ugly antique mirror, at which her father decides that she needs "a man...and babies"—and arranges her marriage to miner Corbin Strock. Prior to the wedding, Brandy goes into the attic and looks dolefully at her veiled image. The attic spins, a vortex grabs Brandy, and she recovers in her bedroom (now carpeted with a different baseboard than earlier), taking off the veil in the process and noticing the body of an old woman beside her. She is given some brandy (under the mistaken impression that she has asked for it) and then lies down overnight.

Shay's wedding to Marek is called off due to the funeral of her grandmother, as well as Rachael's belief that the trauma has affected Shay.About a month later, Brandy (in Shay's body) is found to be pregnant; the doctor recommends abortion, an idea odious to Brandy who runs away from the house. During her run, she is "re-exchanged" briefly with Shay, waking up in her old bedroom (but shortly afterward "exchanged" again to find herself in Shay's body inside a trailer, being helped by an old man named Ansel St. John).

The old man's granddaughter Lottie (who has heard about Shay Garrett's flight) visits him once, and threatens to report Shay/Brandy to Social Services. Brandy bears twins whom she names Elton and Joshua after her own two brothers (Joshua died quite young, Elton never married or had family). She is surprised to hear some of the old man's stories about her family, including that Elton was homosexual, and that John McCabe owned brothels on Water Street.

Lottie attempts an unannounced visit when the twins are about four months old, and seeing the cloth nappies washed and hung to dry by Brandy, promptly calls the Garretts.

Meanwhile, the Garretts' home has been burgled, and the burglars have stolen the evil mirror. Rachael studies Brandy's diaries in the aftermath, noticing a strong similarity between her mother's handwriting and her daughter's, until she comes to a 1921 entry which states "I don't know how you will handle being Shay Garrett...", whereupon she finally learns of the unwilling time-travel of Shay and Brandy. When she reveals the diary to Remy and Dan, the three finally understand why their mother seemed to be "way ahead of time" (she had insisted on their using thread to floss with, and Rachel remembers the inaccurate attempt at cardiac-massage on her father). Marek, meanwhile, wishes to marry Brandy, even though he is not sure how he will live with a Victorian (a term which Brandy finds strange, though it is technically accurate).
