= Amanda McAllister =

Amanda McAllister may refer to:

- Amanda McAllister, pen name of Jean Hager
- Amanda McAllister (Young Sheldon)
