= Daheim =

Daheim may refer to:

- Mary Daheim (born 1937), American novelist
- John Daheim (1916–1991), American stuntman and actor
- Daheim, German magazine
- "Daheim", the actual name of the Hitchcock Estate in Millbrook, New York
