= St Dominic's Grammar School for Girls =

Coordinates: 54.594°N 5.958°W

St. Dominic's Grammar School for Girls

Location
- 135-137 Falls Road; Belfast, County Antrim, BT12 6AE; Northern Ireland

Information
- Motto: Veritas ("truth")
- Religious affiliation: Roman Catholic
- Established: 1870
- Specialist: Humanities
- Board: Education Authority (Belfast)
- Principal: Orla O’Neill
- Gender: All-Female
- Age: 11 to 18
- Enrolment: 1000 (approx)
- Colour
- Type: Grammar School
- Website: https://www.stdominics.org.uk/

St Dominic's Grammar School for Girls (Irish: Scoil Ghramadaí Naomh Doiminic do Chailíní), formerly St Dominic's High School and originally St. Mary's Dominican Convent, is a Catholic grammar school for girls aged 11–18 (Years 8–14), in Belfast, Northern Ireland.

== History ==
St. Dominic's was founded by the Dominican Order in 1870 at the invitation of the Most Reverend Dr. Dorrian, Bishop of Down and Connor on the Falls Road in Belfast. It was originally named St. Mary's Dominican Convent. When it opened on 25 April 1870, there were four pupils enrolled. The boarding school opened on 29 April with one pupil. The Study Hall Block was built in 1897.

The school has grown significantly over the years with the addition of the St. Margaret's Wing in 1950s, St. Thomas's Building in 1960s, and the erection of St. Ita's and St.Raymond's in the 1970s.

== Description ==
St Dominic's Grammar School for Girls is a Catholic grammar school for girls aged 11–18 (Years 8–14), in Belfast, Northern Ireland.

== Academics ==
St. Dominic's has topped the A-Level league table of schools in Northern Ireland with over 95% of entrants receiving 3 or more A-levels at Grades A* to C. In 2019, the school was placed 2nd out of 159 secondary schools in Northern Ireland in its A-Level performance with 94.5% entrants in the 2017–18 academic year receiving this level. In 2021, 98.5 per cent of pupils achieved grades A* to C in three subjects at A Level. Of these A-level students, 69 per cent of grades achieved were A* or A and 92 per cent were A* to B.

In the 2018 Belfast Telegraph GCSE League Table, it was ranked joint ninth in Northern Ireland for its GCSE performance with 99.3% of its entrants to the exam in 2016–17 receiving five or more GCSEs at grades A* to C, including the core subjects English and Maths. In the 2019 League Table it was ranked joint sixth with 99.4% of its GCSE exam entrants receiving five or more A* to C grades.

The school is a specialist school for humanities.

Since 2022, St. Dominic's has collaborated with Friends' School, Lisburn in the development of a Shared Education Signature Project. The primary focus of the project has been creating a ‘Shared History’ based around the events of 1916. history departments in both schools felt that a more ‘joined-up’ approach to the teaching of the Battle of the Somme and the Easter Rising was necessary.

== Sports and extra-curricular activities ==
Students can participate in a wide range of sporting activities including athletics, netball, basketball, gaelic football, camogie, fitness training, rugby, soccer, swimming, volleyball, trampolining, water polo and dance.

There is an increasing variety of extra-curricular activities and clubs in which the students are encouraged to participate. As of 2022 these include: African drumming, book club, cookery club, Cumann Gaelach, dance club, Spanish club, Habitat for Humanity, Homework club, Maths club, Mock Bar Trial, needlework club, poetry reading, science club, technology club, art club, choir, creative writing club, cumann ceoil, French club, Geo club, history club, library club, music, orchestra, public speaking, and young enterprise.

== Awards ==
In 2018, it was awarded The Times Northern Ireland Secondary School of the Year.

== Teachers ==
- Maureen Boyle - poet

== Alumni ==
Name	Born	Died	Activities
Ita McMichael	1925	2018	Writer and nurse
Mary Beckett	1926	2013	Writer
Catherine McWilliams	1940		Visual artist
Betty Williams	1943	2020	Recipient of 1977 Nobel Peace Prize
Anna Carragher	1948		Controller of BBC Northern Ireland; awarded OBE in the 2021 Birthday Honours for services to the arts in Northern Ireland.
Sophia Hillan	1950		Writer and critic
Mary McAleese	1951		Eighth President of Ireland 1997-2011
Dolours Price	1950	2013	IRA activist
Patricia Craig	1952		Writer
Rotha Johnston	1959		Businessperson
Eilís Ferran	1962		Legal scholar; elected a Fellow of the British Academy (FBA), the United Kingdom's national academy for the humanities and social sciences.
Roisin Molloy			Medical technology business person
Emma Magee	1967		Sportswoman; Played for Northern Ireland national netball team and Antrim ladies' Gaelic football team
Nicola Steedman	1972		Scottish Deputy Chief Medical Officer
Nichola Mallon	1979		Lord Mayor of Belfast 2014-2015; MLA for Belfast North 2016-2022; Minister of Infrastructure 2020-2022
Sorcha Eastwood	1985		MP for Lagan Valley
Órlaithí Flynn	1988		MLA for Belfast West
Lola Petticrew	1995		Actress
Michelle Magee	2000		Sportswoman; Played for Northern Ireland national netball team and Antrim ladies' Gaelic football team.

== See also ==
- Dominicans in Ireland
- List of secondary schools in Belfast
- List of grammar schools in Northern Ireland
