= Georges Baussan =

Haitian architect (1874–1958)

- Born: 13 October 1874; Port-au-Prince, Haiti
- Died: 9 February 1958 (aged 83); Port-au-Prince, Haiti
- Citizenship: Haitian
- Education: École Spéciale d'Architecture
- Occupation: Architect
- Years active: 1900-1955
- Spouse(s): Unidentified (d. c 1914); Alice Élie, 1916-1958
- Children: 9
- Parent: Horatius Baussan
- Buildings: National Palace (Haiti); City Hall of Port-au-Prince; Supreme Court of Haiti; Casernes Dessalines; Church of the Sacred Heart; Villa Fraenkel; Bellegarde House

Georges Baussan (13 October 1874–9 February 1958) was a Haitian architect known for his contribution to his nation’s architecture, particularly in his design of numerous Gingerbread Houses, and his classical design of the National Palace in Port-au-Prince.

== Early life and education ==
Georges Horatius Baussan was born in Port-au-Prince, on October 13, 1874, the second of eight children born to Horatius Baussan and his wife Marie. Horatius also fathered children outside of his marriage, giving Georges two half-siblings who used the name Mecklembourg. The family belonged to the country’s elite; Horatius was a prominent lawyer, president of the senate and, in 1920, one of the founders of the l’Union Patriotique a Haiti.

Baussan grew up in Port-au-Prince where, following Haiti’s independence from France in 1804, reconstruction work continued to focus on European traditions adapted to the Caribbean climate. His childhood was also marked by significant political and social instability, something which led to his later emphasis on public structures which symbolized stability and national pride.

In 1895, Baussan moved to Paris to attend the École Spéciale d'Architecture, where he was joined by his friends and fellow Haitians, Joseph-Eugène Maximilien and Léon Mathon. The school’s curriculum emphasized French neoclassical principles, Beaux-Arts compositional methods (symmetry, axial planning, classical ornamentation, historical referencing), monumental design and engineering, and eclectic and contemporary architectural forms that blended functionality with decorative flair. Living in Paris was an influential experience on its own; this was the Belle Époque, when Paris was undergoing significant urban planning and redevelopment. Baussan saw unique public squares, new road design and colonial styles, all of which he could apply to Haiti’s modernization efforts.

== Career ==
Baussan returned to Haiti c 1900 and established his professional practice in Port-au-Prince. He began adapting his European training to local conditions, meaning that he was creating buildings that incorporated French Neoclassical influences with Haitian vernacular elements—and that were made out of wood. Haiti is hot and humid with extreme temperature variations, and a famous vulnerability to hurricanes, so Haitian builders knew that concrete was not the correct material for use on the island. While termites are also an issue, they are less damaging than high winds.

Baussan’s first building was the home of the Danish merchant Joseph Fraenkel; the Villa Fraenkel was completed c 1902 and converted into the Hôtel Splendid in 1929. His next projects were the Église du Sacré-Cœur de Turgeau (the Church of the Sacred Heart), which was completed c 1905. It was an elegant brick and wood structure, featuring exceptional masonry work by local artisans. Over the years, concrete additions were applied to the church; as a result, it was destroyed in the 2010 earthquake. That was followed by the Lycée Alexandre Pétion, and another grand house, that of the historian and diplomat Dantès Bellegarde, which was completed in 1910 and became known as the “Baussan House”. While in a woeful state of disrepair, as of 2026, the wooden structure is still standing. One of his grandest houses, the 1912 Castel Fleuri, remains standing.

Other notable projects completed by Baussan before 1930 include the City Hall of Port-au-Prince and the Supreme Court building. In 1912, Baussan designed the military barracks Casernes Dessalines and, in 1928, the Hôtel de Ville de Port-au-Prince. His last project was likely the 1942 house of the writer Jacques Roumain.

=== Gingerbread Houses ===
The houses built by Baussan are known as “Gingerbread Houses”. Between 1880 and 1925, at least 300 houses were constructed in the Haitian Gingerbread style, which was created by a combination of European and North American influences, Haitian traditions, and climate-related necessity. These houses were highly decorative, with Haitian fretwork and latticework, ornate balustrades, and colourful patterns. They were constructed of braced timber framing with masonry infills, and had metal roofs, deep wrap-around porches, louvered shutters, large windows and doors, and to maximize air flow and manage wind pressure, tall ceilings and numerous side windows.

The Gingerbread Era was brought to an end when, in 1925, and fearing the risk of fire, the mayor of Port-au-Prince issued an edict banning further wooden construction. That was followed by a reduction in the number of artisans who had the skill set to build these houses. Finally, rampant deforestation removed the wood supply.

It is unclear whether Baussan worked directly with Joseph-Eugène Maximilien and Léon Mathon, but the three men were responsible for building all of the post-1900 Gingerbread houses, most of which remained standing after the 2010 earthquake, but many of which have since been burned down by gangs. Those that remain are an important part of Haitian identity.

As of 2026, the World Monuments Fund has placed the remaining Gingerbread houses on its preservation and conversation list; attempts at renovation, rehabilitation and preservation are ongoing.

=== The National Palace ===
Baussan's most celebrated work is the National Palace (Palais National), selected in 1912 from a national competition among Haitian and French architects; his "Petit Nid" (Little Nest) design was chosen because the plan was less expensive. Construction began in May 1914 with a $350,000 budget, but was interrupted in 1915 by political unrest that damaged the structure. Under the United States occupation of Haiti, it was completed by the United States Army Corps of Engineers. The palace, an E-shaped building with domed pavilions and Ionic columns, symbolized national prestige. For durability, Baussan used tropical hardwoods, brick infills and lime mortar. For cultural references, he used mahogany paneling and Haitian motifs to promote national identity--Vodou veve symbols and folk-art patterns. This transformed a neoclassical design into an expression of Haitian identity.

== Personal life and legacy ==
Baussan was married twice. His first wife, whose name is not known, died after producing three daughters and one son. On May 7, 1916, Baussan married Alice Élie (1889-1978); they had five children.

Georges' son Robert Bausson (1908-2009) became a modernist architect, also practicing in Haiti. He is credited with the reclamation and development of Haiti’s Cacique Island, (now known as Simple Plaisir Island and not to be confused with Panama’s Cacique Island), and became Undersecretary of State for Tourism. He was married to the Russian artist Tamara (Zekom) Baussan.

Baussan spent the rest of his life in Haiti, on a sprawling estate with the largest rose garden in the West Indies—800 bushes. He and his wife were at the top of Haitian society and, in 1932, he became president of the ultra-exclusive social and sports club Cercle Bellevue. In 1953, he became a co-founder of the Haytian-American Mineral Company.

Between the 2010 earthquake and ongoing political and social unrest in Haiti, archives and records of all kinds have been lost. Few of Baussan’s structures survived the 2010 earthquake. But he remains Haiti’s preeminent architect; there is now a village near Port-au-Prince named Baussan.

== Known works ==
- Villa Fraenkel, 1902
- Église du Sacré-Cœur de Turgeau (Church of the Sacred Heart), 1905
- Lycée Alexandre Pétion, 1906
- Bellegarde House, aka Baussan House, 1910
- Castel Fleuri, 1912
- Casernes Dessalines, 1912
- Palais de Justice, The National Palace of Haiti, 1920
- Hôtel de Ville, 1928
- Le Manoir des Lauriers, 1927
- Mairie de Port-au-Prince (City Hall), 1928
- Le Palais de la Cour de Cassation (Supreme Court of Haiti), c 1929
- Roumain House, c 1942
