= Gingerbread (architecture) =

Victorian-era architectural element

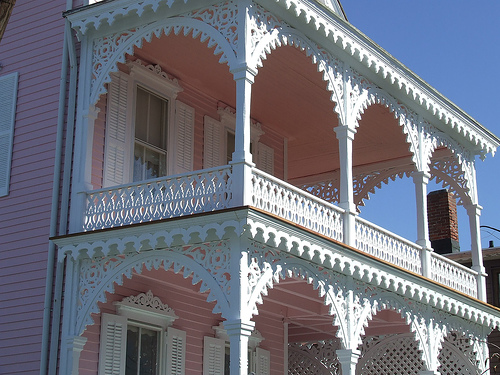
Gingerbread trim on a Victorian-era house in Cape May, New Jersey

Gingerbread is an architectural style that consists of elaborately detailed embellishment known as "gingerbread trim". It is more specifically used to describe the detailed decorative work of American designers in the late 1860s and 1870s, which was associated mostly with the Carpenter Gothic style. It was loosely based on the Picturesque period of English architecture in the 1830s.

== History ==
During the 1830s and 1840s, American home builders started interpreting the European Gothic Revival architecture, which had elaborate masonry details, in wood to decorate American timber frame homes. This was also known as Carpenter Gothic. The early designs started with simple stickwork such as vertical sawtooth siding. By the middle of the 19th century, with the invention of the steam-powered scroll saw, the mass production of thin boards that were cut into a variety of ornamental parts had helped builders to transform simple cottages into unique houses. At the time, standard sized gingerbread elements were manufactured at low cost in the American East Coast.

Not everyone approved of this architectural style. Andrew Jackson Downing, a prominent advocate of the Gothic Revival criticized this style in his Architecture of Country Houses in 1852. He classified homes in the United States into three types: villas for the wealthy, cottages for working people and farmhouses for farmers. He argued that the lower-cost cottages which were small in size and had simplistic style should not be ornamented with the elaborate embellishment of a villa. He further argued that the vergeboard of the Rural Gothic gable should have been carefully carved in thick and solid plank to appreciate its beauty instead of an ornamental part which was "sawn out of thin board, so as to have a frippery and 'gingerbread' look which degrades, rather than elevates, the beauty of the cottage."

The style lived on and flourished in the residential areas of Chicago in the 1860s. That didn't last very long as the Great Chicago Fire in 1871 destroyed many of those buildings. Some attributed a cause of the fire to be worsened due to the cheap construction materials and the gingerbread decorations in hoping other cities would heed the warning. Still, the style continued to spread to the West. By the late 1870s, San Francisco had many gingerbread houses at a similar level of Chicago five or ten years earlier.

In Ontario, Canada, a house style in the area called Ontario Cottage had been evolving since the 1830s. In the third quarter of the 19th century, the builders incorporated gingerbread elements to large houses. A prominent character was to use ornamental bargeboard and finials to decorate the gables. As railways were expanded into cities such as Stratford, more Ontario cottages and houses were built. They were typically one and a half story to one and three-quarter story brick homes with gingerbread wood trim on gables and the front facade. This type of house became prominent from the 1870s to the 1890s.

In 1878, a fire in Cape May, New Jersey, destroyed 30 blocks of properties of the seaside town. The town rebuilt quickly. Many were rebuilt with much gingerbread trim and many gables and turrets. This resulted in a high concentration of late 19th century buildings in the town. According to the National Register of Historic Places, "Cape May has one of the largest collections of late 19th century frame buildings left in the United States. It contains over 600 summer houses, old hotels, and commercial structures that give it a homogeneous architectural character, a kind of textbook of vernacular American building."

In the 1880s, many houses in California adopted the Eastlake style, which was named after Charles Eastlake a British architect and furniture designer. Eastlake published a book that contained illustrations of interior designs of incised wood panels and knobs to complement his furniture designs. American home builders expanded that to home exteriors by replacing flat-cut gingerbread ornamental elements with lathe-turned spindlework for balusters and wall surface decoration. However, Eastlake criticized the American adaptation as "extravagant and bizarre". The style was later combined with Italianate and Second Empire elements to create the "San Francisco Style".

== In Haiti ==
Residential buildings of wealthy individuals in Haiti during the Gingerbread era, between the 1880s and the 1920s, had a unique architecture that combined the local traditions and adaptation of foreign influences. The adaptation was influenced by many factors including manuals of styles that were circulated from Europe and North America, Haitian architects who studied abroad, and French artisans who set up woodworking shops to train Haitian artisans. Those Gingerbread houses were highly decorative with fretworks, latticeworks with patterns that are unique to Haiti. The structures of this style typically have large windows and doors, tall ceilings, large attics, and deep porches.

=== History ===
The movement of the style began in 1881 with the second Haitian National Palace during the presidency of Lysius Salomon. This was followed by the construction of a private villa, now known as Hotel Oloffson, commissioned by President Tirésias Simon Sam's son in 1887. In 1895, three young Haitians—Georges Baussan, Léon Mathon, and Joseph-Eugène Maximilien—traveled to Paris to study architecture, were inspired to build upon the nascent architectural movement, and modified the style to the climate in Haiti by designing homes with vibrant patterns and flamboyant colors of French resort architecture. Many large houses in upscale neighborhoods of Pacot, Turgeau, and Bois-Verna in Port-au-Prince were built in this style. A notable example of those is Villa Miramar (also known as Villa Cordasco) in Pacot, built in 1914. (In 2025, the Villa Miramar and the Hotel Oloffson were burned down by armed gangs amidst the Haitian political crisis.) The style then spread to the rest of the country including Saint-Marc, Jérémie, Les Cayes, Petit-Goâve, and Léogâne until 1925.

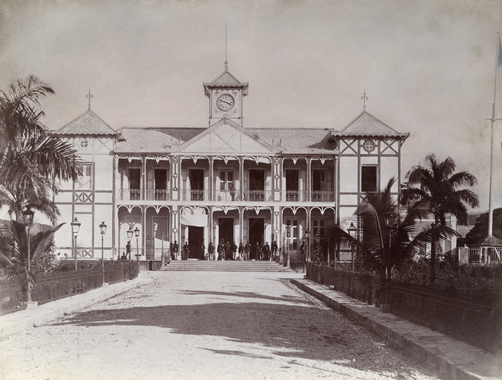
The second National Palace

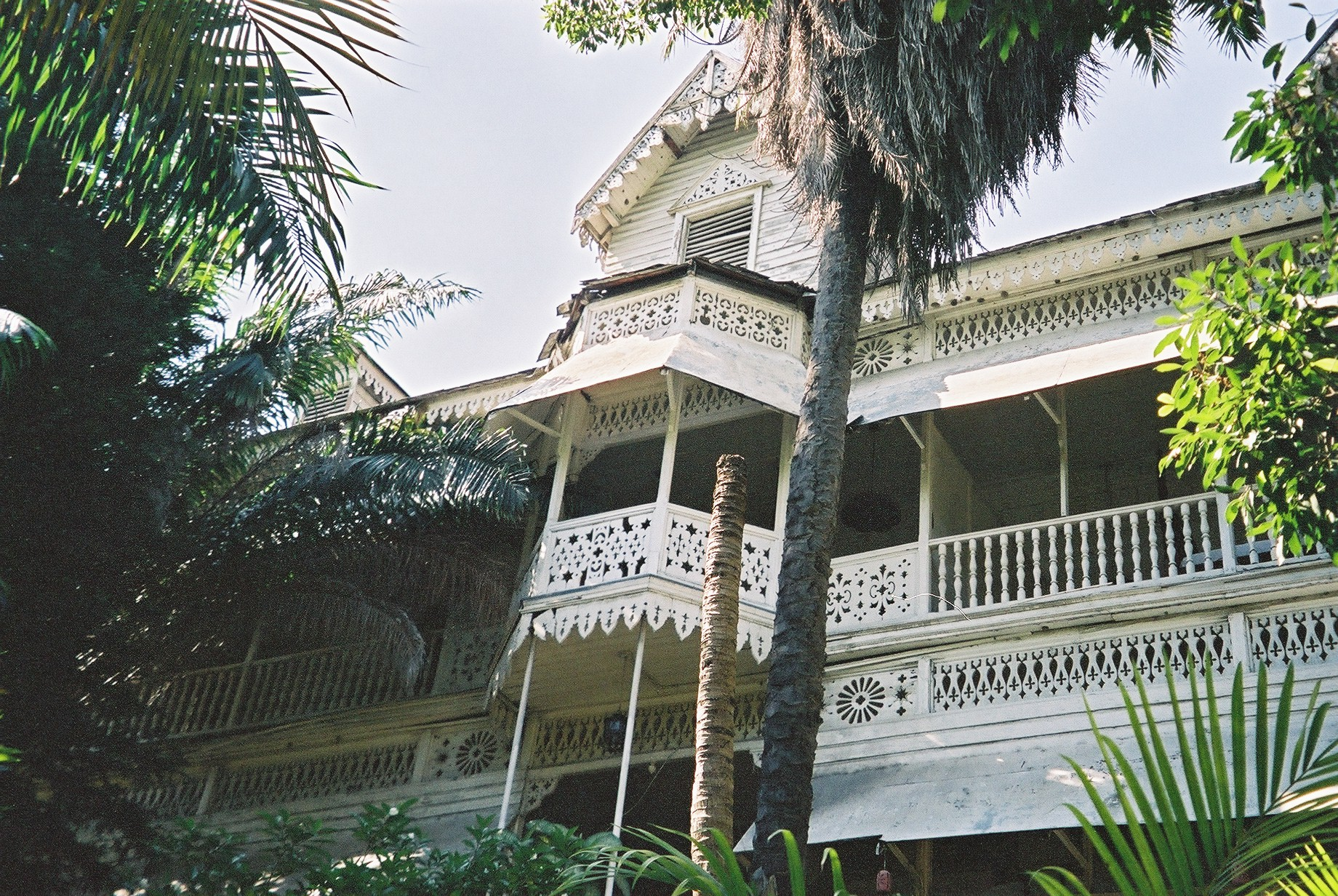
Hotel Oloffson, a Gingerbread hotel in Port-au-Prince, Haiti

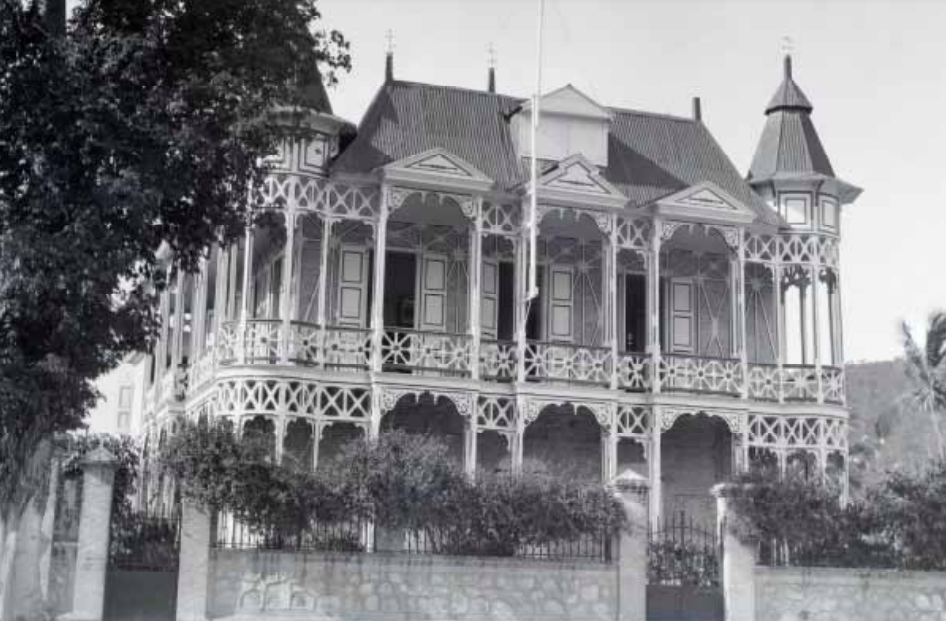
The school of the Brothers of Christian Instruction in Saint-Marc, Haiti

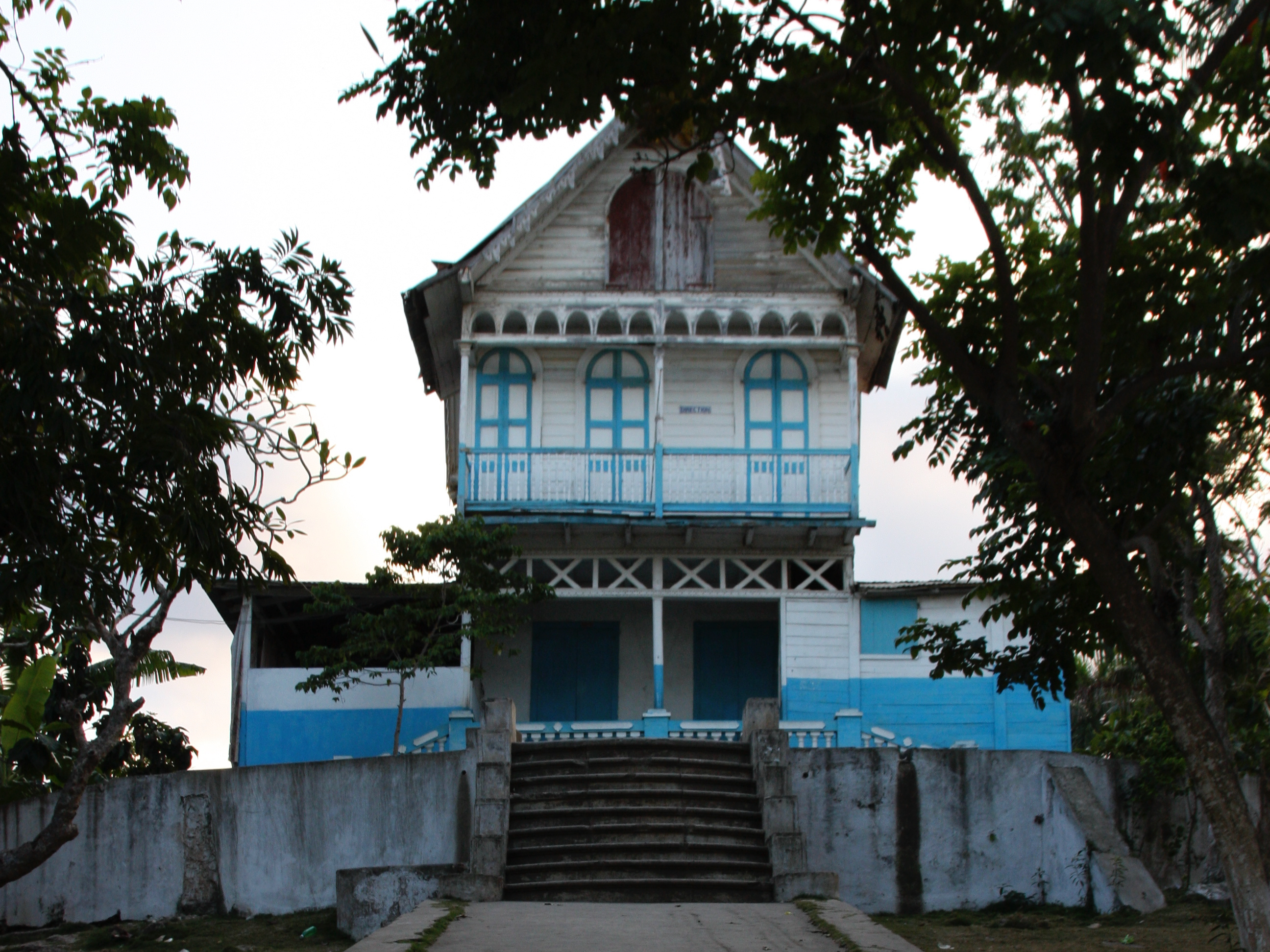
The Hilaire residence in Jérémie, Haiti

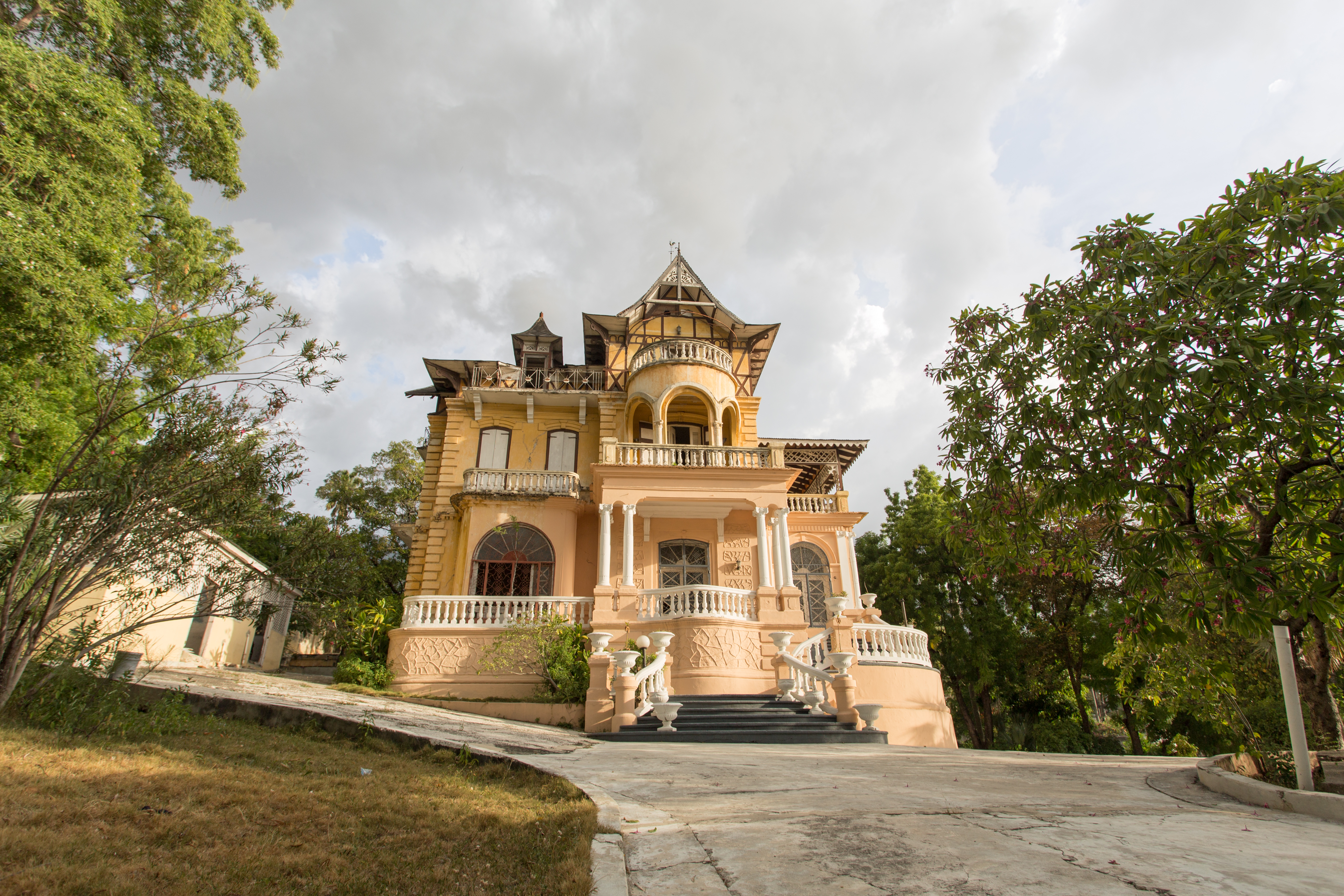
Villa Miramar

After 1925, new construction materials became available including concrete, and a new regulation that mandated masonry, reinforced concrete, or iron structures for fire prevention. That caused the architectural styles in Haiti to shift away from the gingerbread style. However, after 1946, the middle class families in Port-au-Prince neighborhoods incorporated parts of the styles into their modest sized houses.

Gingerbread was coined by American tourists in the 1950s, who appreciated the style which bore similarity to that of the Victorian-era buildings with gingerbread trim in the United States.

Prior to 2010, the style had bad connotations due to its associations with colonialism and elitism. After the 2010 earthquake, people in Haiti considered rebuilding their homes in gingerbread style due to its resilience to earthquakes. It shifted the tone for the style to be more positive in local communities.

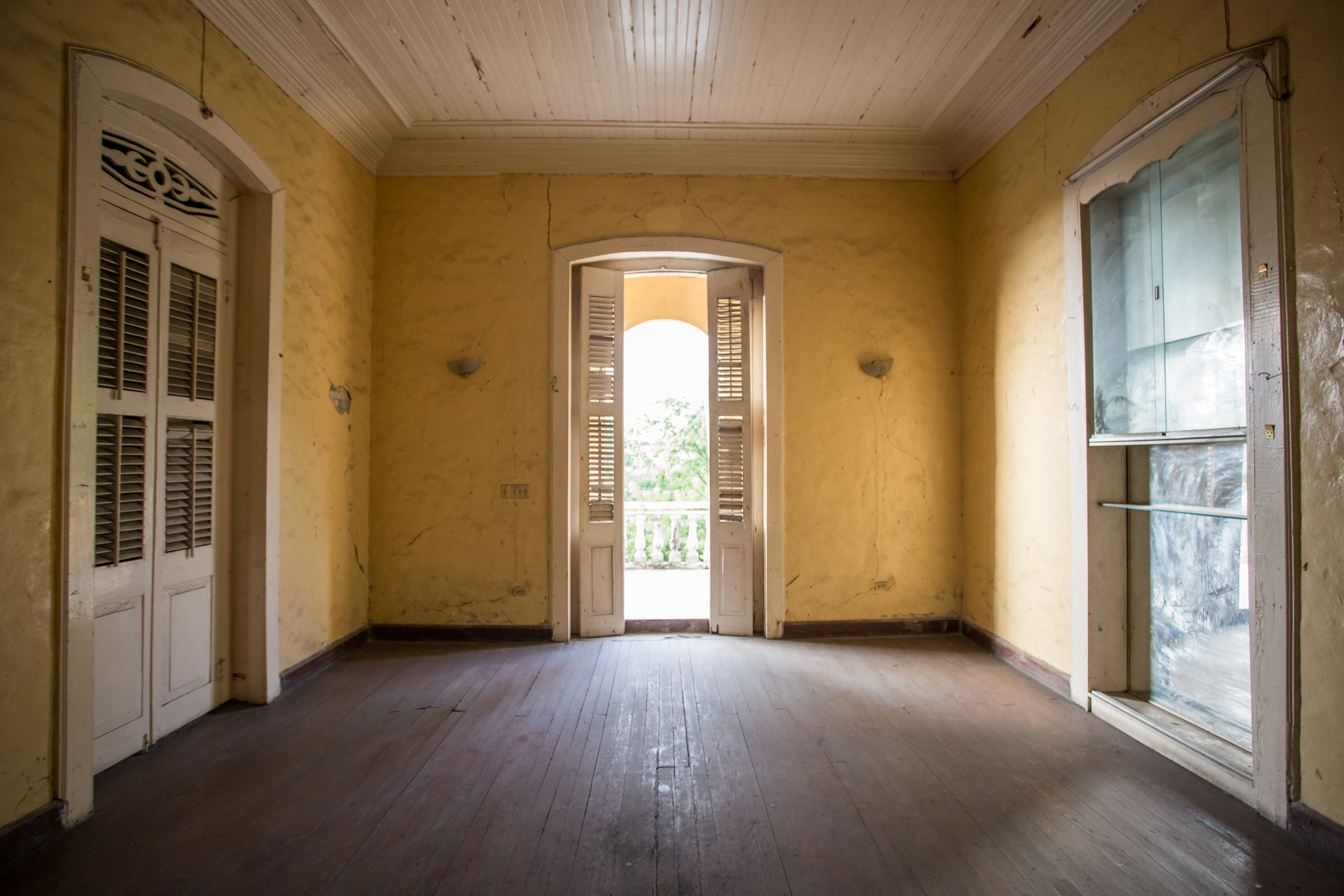
Tall doors with louvered shutters at Villa Miramar in Port-au-Prince, Haiti

=== Characteristics ===
The gingerbread house by design combines architectural knowledge that stemmed abroad, into an understanding of the Caribbean climate and its living conditions. They were constructed with tall doors, high ceilings, with steep turret roofs to redirect hot air above its inhabitable rooms, along with a cross-breeze of louvered shutter windows on all sides instead of glass to offset the most scorching of days, flexible timber frames with the innate ability to weather some of the toughest storms and tremors, and built with wrap-around verandas. The houses are usually constructed of wood, masonry, or stone and clay.

=== Preservation ===
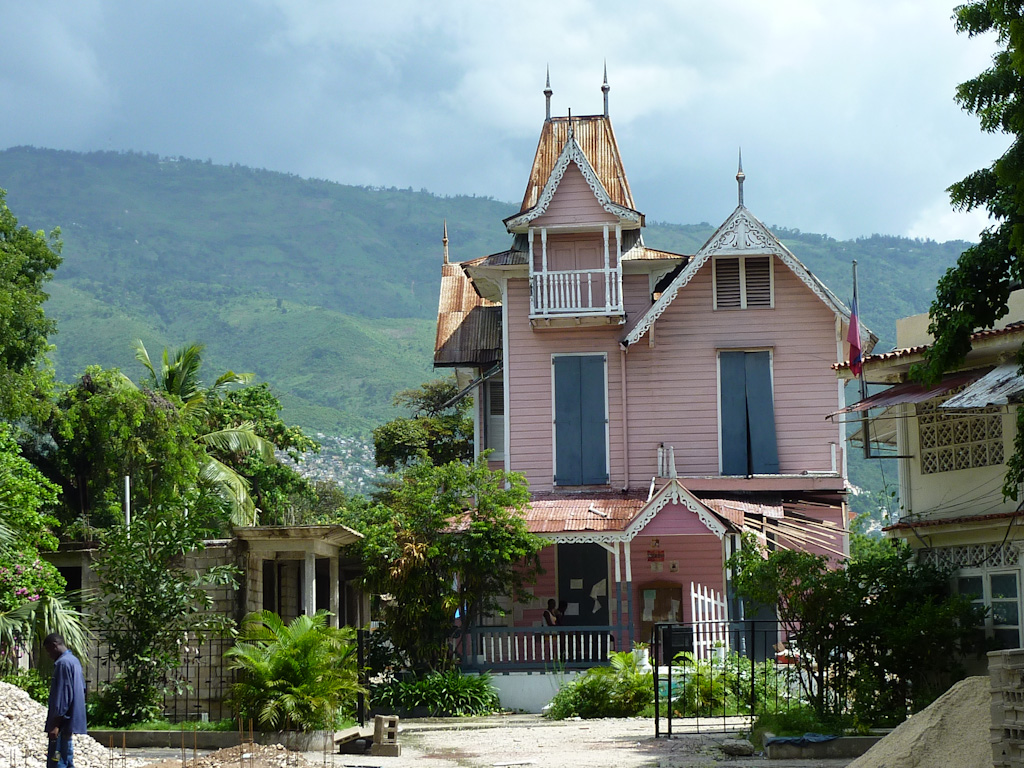
Gingerbread house at Université Episcopale d'Haiti was left standing when the three-story classroom building adjacent to it collapsed in an earthquake.

This specific architectural heritage in Haiti is now threatened as the natural aging of the wood, the weather, the high cost of restoration and repairs are all detrimental to the survival of this style. The style was listed on the 2010 World Monuments Watch. The listing was just before the 2010 earthquake that struck Haiti. Surprisingly, only five percent of the estimated 200 gingerbread houses were partially or fully collapsed, in contrast to about 300,000 collapsed buildings which were 40% of all other structures. This left U.S. conservation experts to believe that this architecture can be a model for seismic-resistant structures for the future. The gingerbread neighborhood of Haiti was listed as one of twenty-five sites on the 2020 World Monuments Watch.

== In Thailand ==
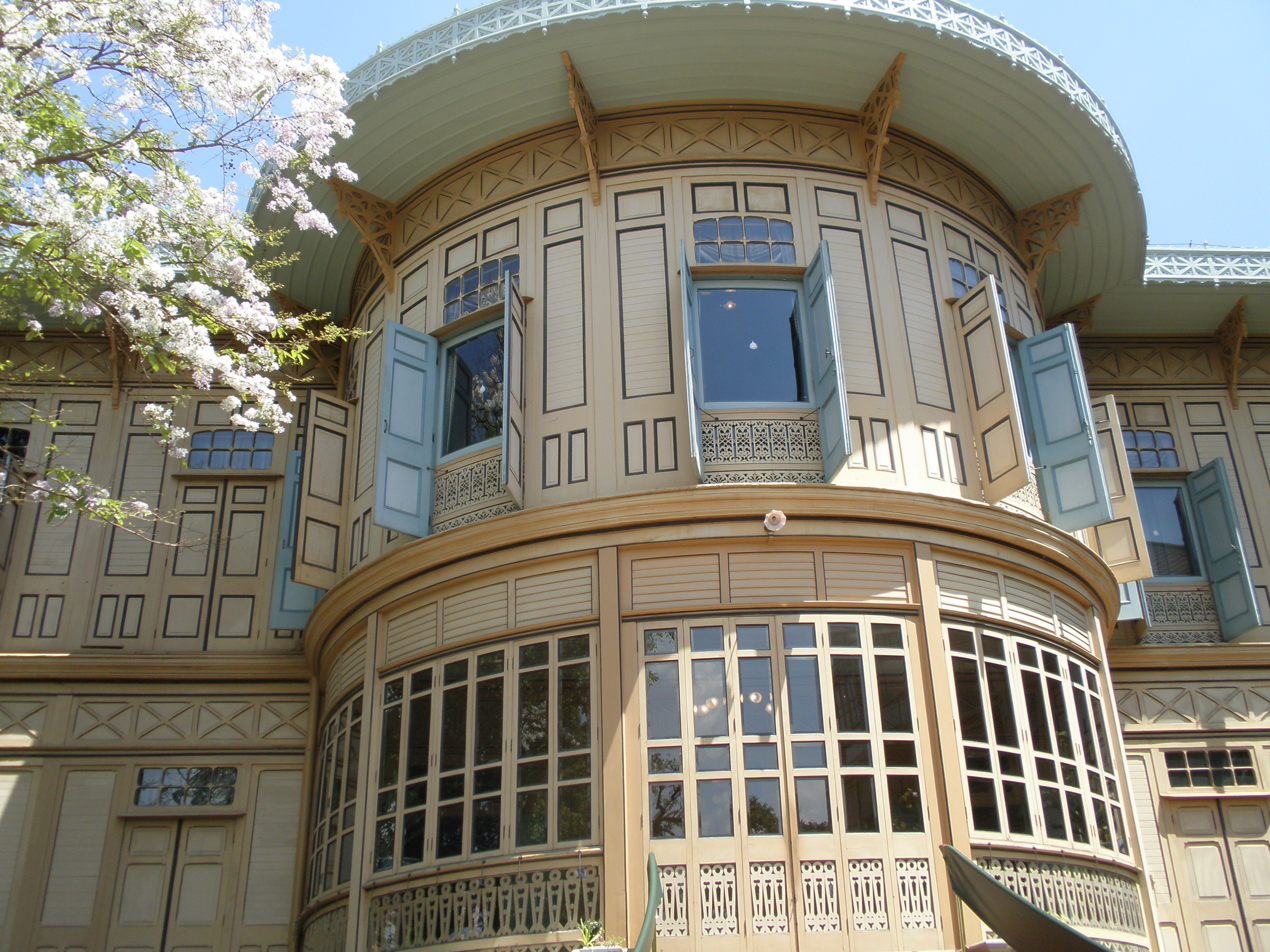
Gingerbread air passages under the windows of Vimanmek Mansion in Bangkok, Thailand

=== History ===
During the European colonisation of Southeast Asia in the 19th century, wood was in high demand. The British timber industry started logging in India for teak, a tropical hardwood native to south and southeast Asia. The teak logging industry then expanded from India to Burma following British rule in Burma. Although Thailand was not a colony, Britain still wanted to expand its teak logging to Thailand. In 1883, Britain won logging a concession agreement with a local ruler in the northern provinces, making Phrae the center of British teak logging in Thailand. The British companies and rulers in northern Thailand built their teak gingerbread houses based on the styles from Britain. The Western architectural style with gingerbread trim was blended with Asian architectural elements such as perforated wood panels to create a style known locally as Lanna Colonial.

During that period, American style gingerbread houses with decorative wooden fretwork became popular. The style caught on in some British colonies including Singapore and Burma, and then spread to Thailand. Thais of high social standing in the era of King Rama V built teak gingerbread houses to showcase the craftsmanship.

Eventually, the popularity of gingerbread houses in Thailand faded away due to high construction and maintenance costs. Today, the remaining gingerbread houses in Thailand can be seen in various locations in Bangkok, Nakhon Pathom, Phrae, Lampang and Chanthaburi.

=== Characteristics ===
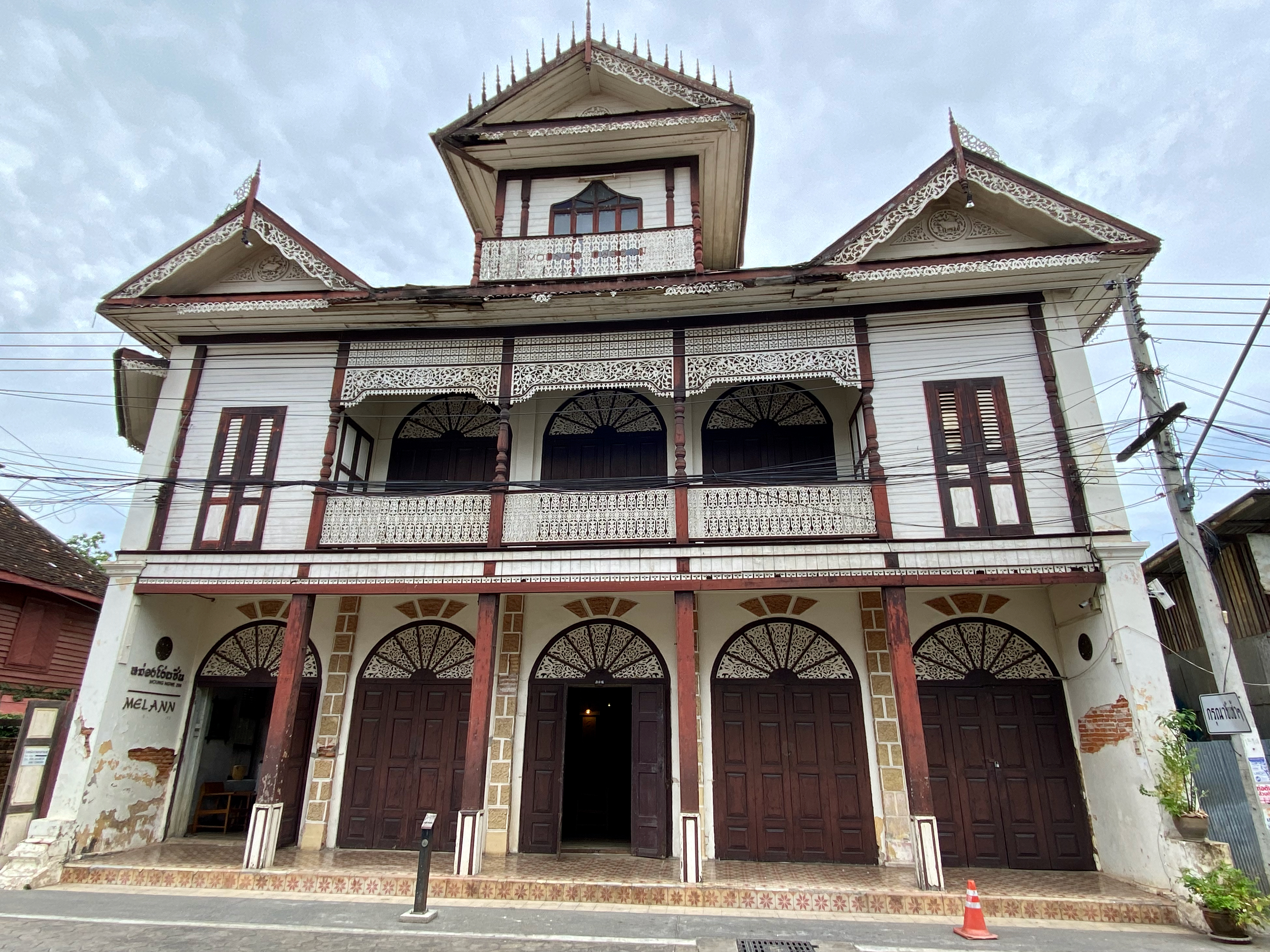
Moung Ngwe Zin, an example of gingerbread commercial buildings in Lampang

Gingerbread houses in the northern provinces of Thailand combined the Lan Na arts and crafts and Victorian-era architecture. Additionally, commercial buildings owned by Chinese settlers and Burmese logging workers incorporated elaborate gingerbread decoration as part of the unique half-wood half-concrete structure called Saranai (or Salanai). These buildings are terraced houses with folding front doors on the first floor that can be fully opened to use as a storefront. The eaves, air passages above the doors, and ornate balustrades are decorated with intricately carved wood panels in different styles including Burmese style. These commercial buildings can be seen in Chiang Mai and Lampang.

There were no specific patterns on the gingerbread trim used in the houses in Bangkok and the northern provinces. The principal design elements of Victorian Gothic such as quatrefoil, cross, and flame were used as an inspiration and several gingerbread patterns were developed locally. Popular patterns included, tulips, vines, geometric shapes, mosquito larvae, fruits and vegetables. The fretworks were made by using both perforated and carved woods. Most artisans were local and Chinese that made the fretwork locally, but some of the gingerbread trim was made in Bangkok and shipped to construction sites.

A unique character of gingerbread houses in Thailand, to adapt to warmer climate, was the use of gingerbread-style fretwork to create air passages and install them near the floor or under the roof to allow air to flow throughout the house.

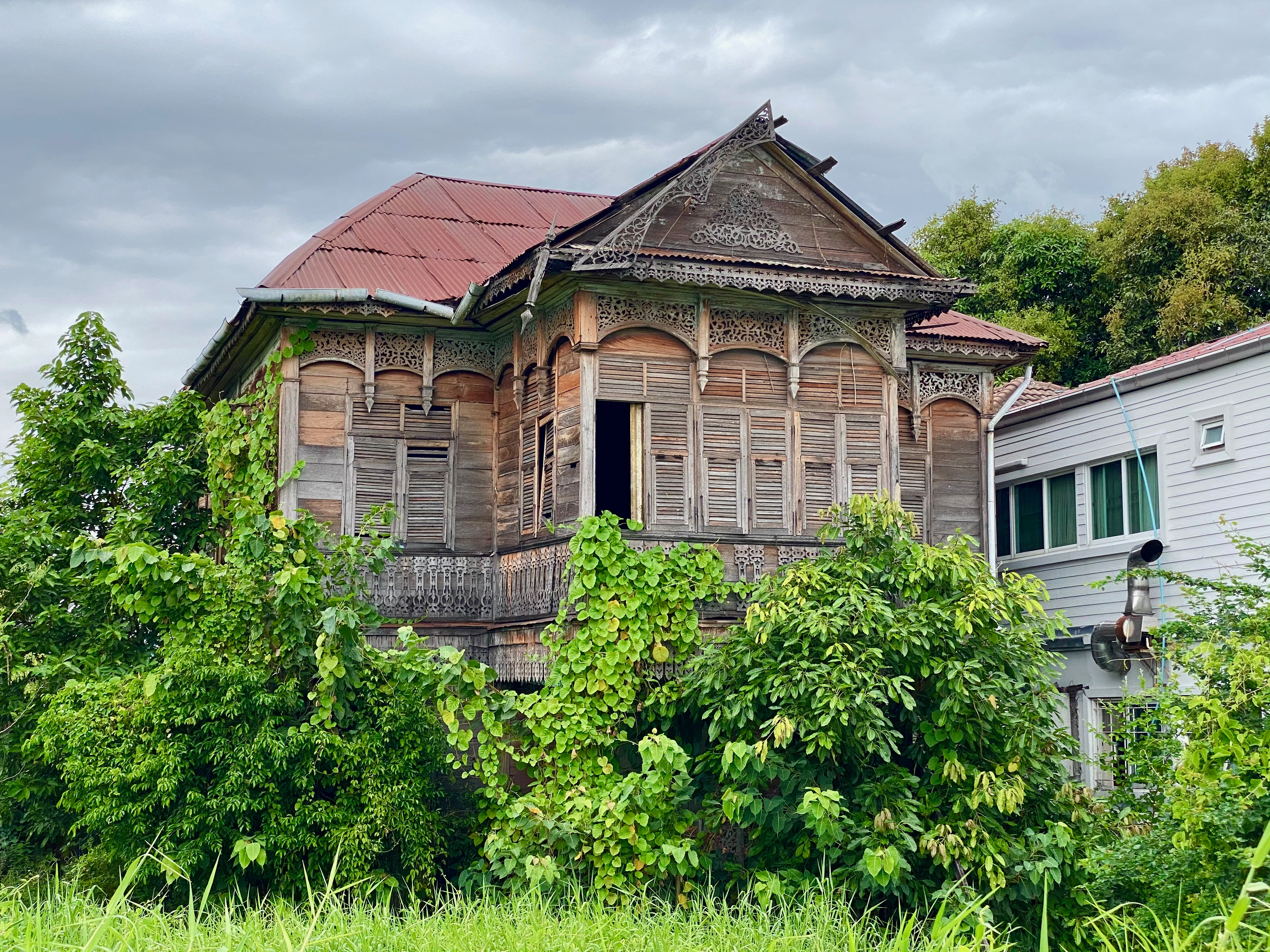
A gingerbread house, originally known as Windsor House, on the bank of Chao Phraya River in disrepair

=== Preservation ===
Many of the gingerbread houses that are owned by the Thai government or temples are preserved in good condition. However, many private homes are at risk of destruction by the elements due to high costs of maintenance of intricate fretwork. Another approach to preservation is to repurpose the buildings. Some private homes have been preserved and given a new life as museums. A deserted gingerbread house, a former private residence in Bangkok, was restored and turned into a cafe.

Many teak gingerbread houses in the northern provinces, especially in Chiang Rai, Chiang Mai, and Phayao, have been destroyed throughout the years as the owners demolished them to sell the wood due to high demand of second-hand teak wood since 1989. To combat this issue, the Phrae Architectural Heritage Club has engaged the communities in Phrae to preserve their gingerbread houses and turned them into a major tourist attraction for Phrae.

== Notable examples ==
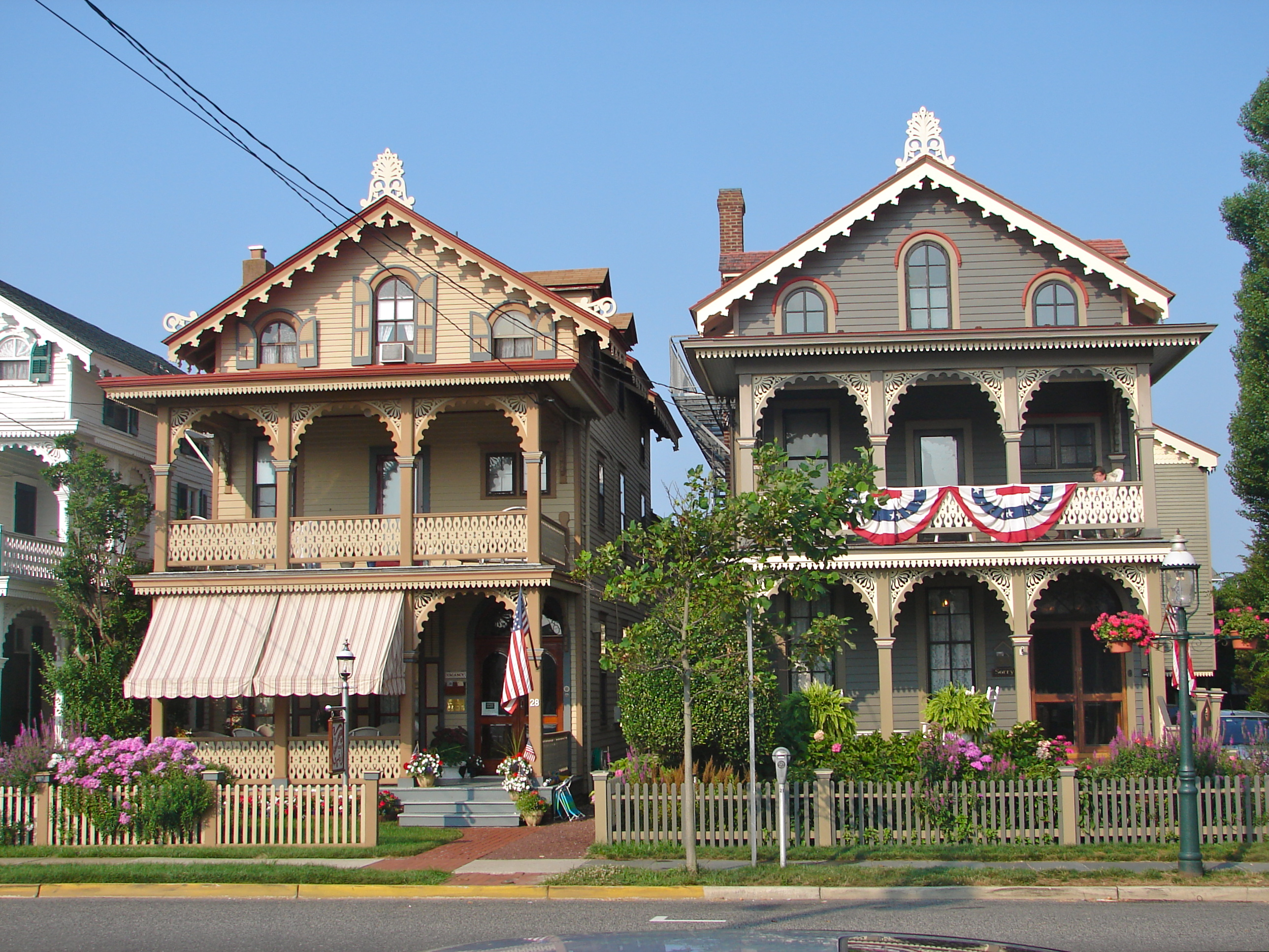
Many Victorian-era buildings in the Cape May Historic District, New Jersey

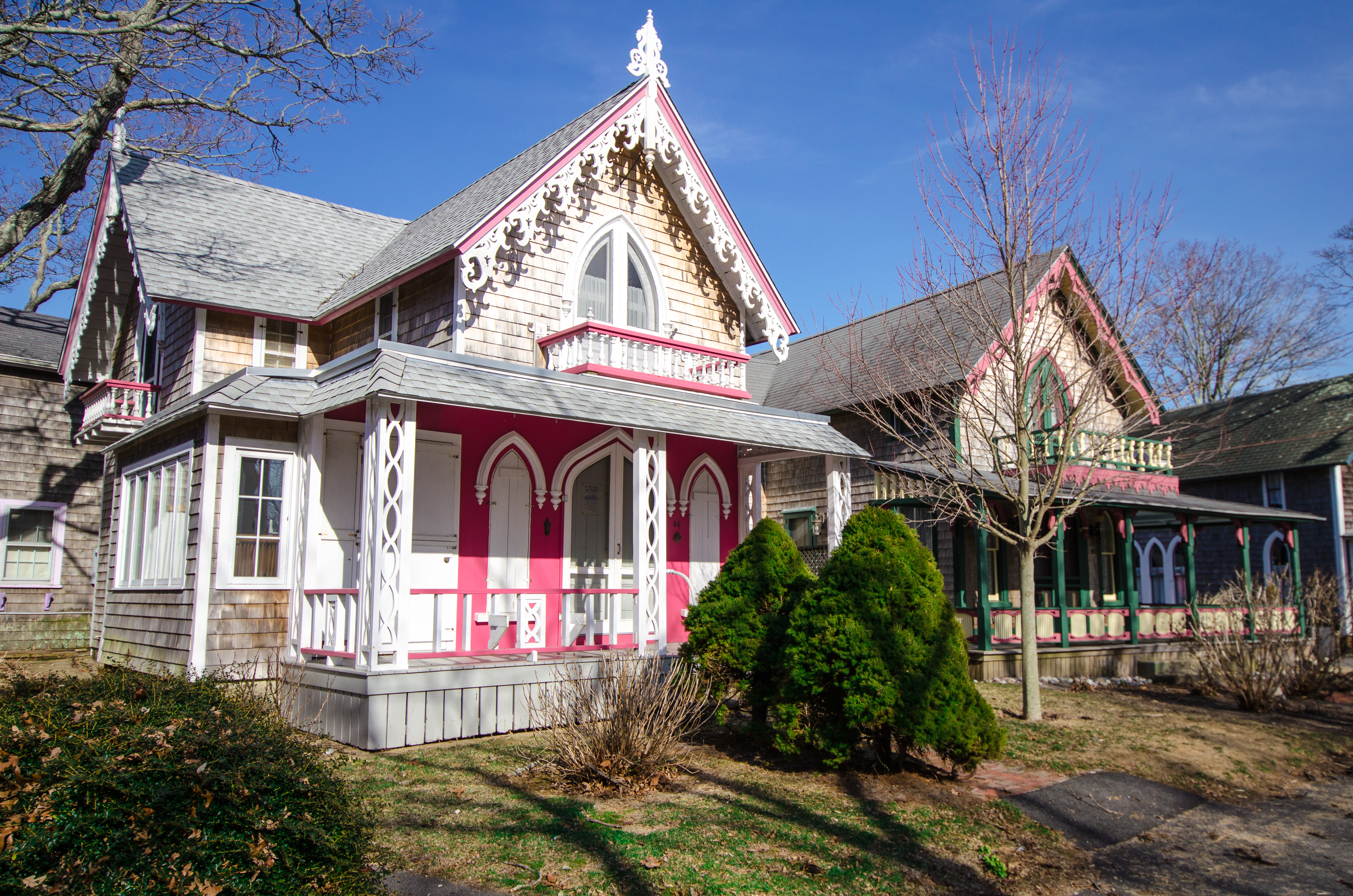
Gingerbread cottages in Oak Bluffs, Massachusetts

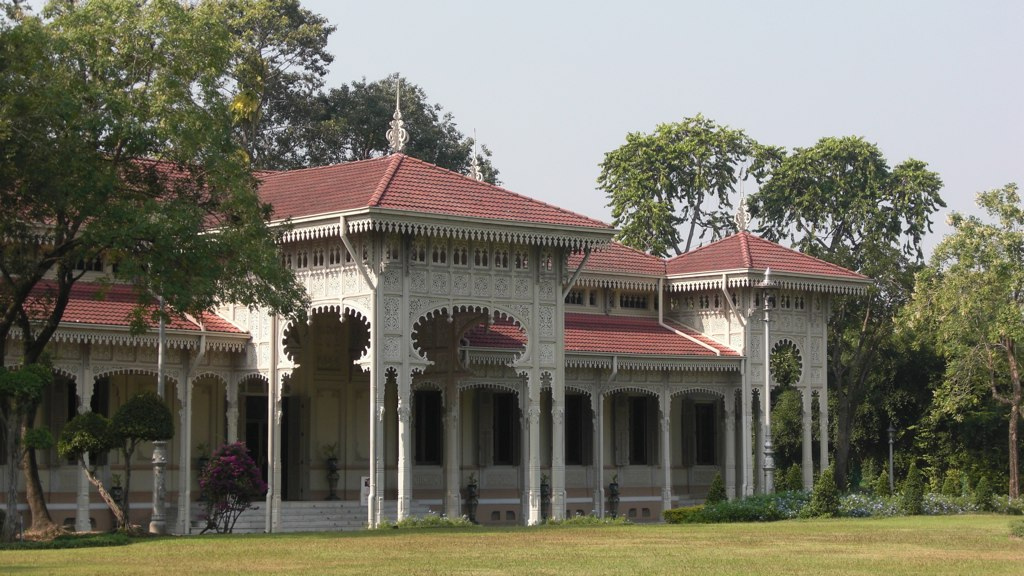
Abhisek Dusit Throne Hall, a gingerbread house in Bangkok, Thailand

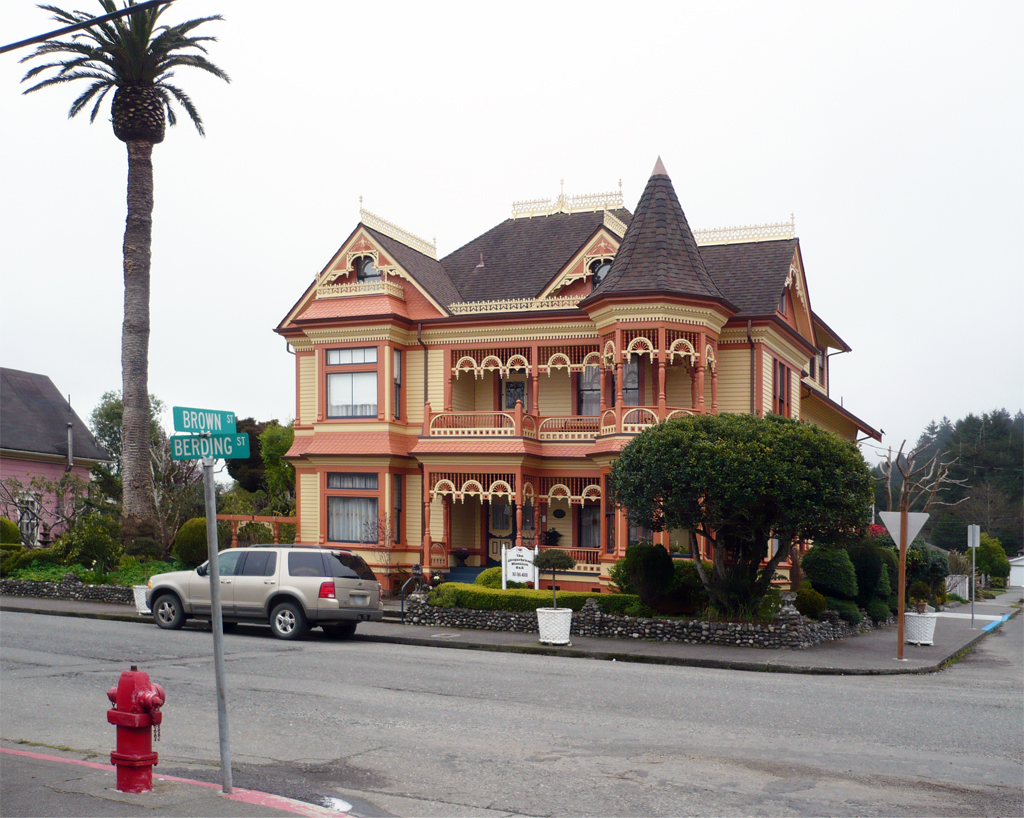
Gingerbread Mansion in Ferndale, California, built in the American Queen Anne style

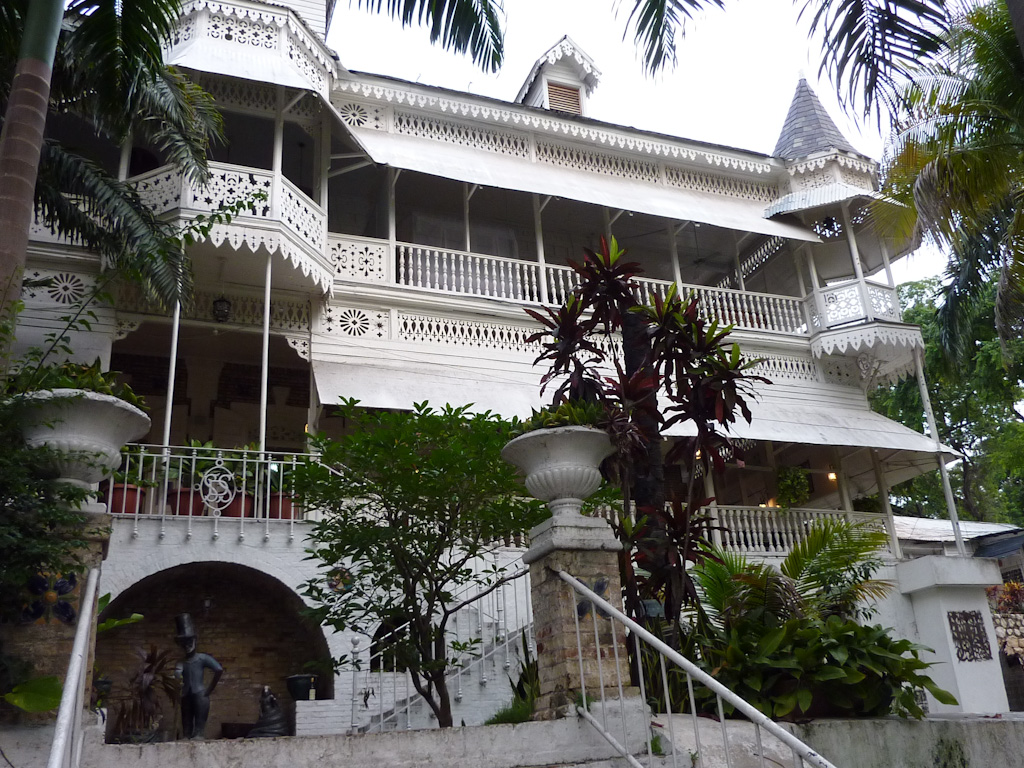
Hotel Oloffson in Port-au-Prince
