= Catherine McWilliams =

Visual artist from Northern Ireland

- Born: 1940 (age 85–86); Antrim
- Education: Belfast College of Art
- Spouse: Joseph McWilliams
- Website: https://www.catherinemcwilliams.com/

Catherine McWilliams (born 1940) is a visual artist from Northern Ireland.

== Biography ==
Catherine McWilliams was born in 1940 in Belfast. She attended the St Dominic's Grammar School for Girls and then Belfast School of Art. She began exhibiting her work in 1961.

She and her husband, Joseph McWilliams, opened the Cavehill Gallery in 1986. She worked as a teacher in Art at Rupert Stanley College until 1990.

McWilliams has been awarded a number of prizes and grants. Her art is part of the public collections in the Arts Council of Northern Ireland and The National Self Portrait Collection, University of Limerick.

== Awards ==
- 2020 Sculpture Prize Sponsored by Hamilton Architects, Royal Ulster Academy
- 2003 General Arts Scheme Award, Arts Council of Northern Ireland
- 1999 Arts Council of Northern Ireland award for materials
- 1992 Arts Council of Northern Ireland award for materials
- 1992 British Council travel award
- 1992 An Chomhairle Ealaion travel award
