= Janet Laurence (author) =

British writer

Janet Laurence (born 1937 as Janet Duffell), also known by her pen name Julia Lisle, is a British author and cookery writer.

== Cookery writer ==
From 1978, Laurence began to write cookery articles for Country Life and The Daily Telegraph. Eventually she became the sole author of the Telegraphs weekly 'Bon Viveur' column. She also wrote a series of articles in Country Life about historical cooking. She has written or co-written eight cookery books, notably books about Scandinavian cooking.

== Crime fiction ==
Laurence's first crime novel, 'A Deepe Coffyn', was published in 1989, the first of ten contemporary novels featuring cookery writer Darina Lisle and policeman William Pigram. She also wrote one non-series mystery fiction book, 'To Kill The Past'. Laurence has also written four historical crime novels – three books where the detective is a fictionalised Canaletto (the Italian artist), and one set in early Edwardian times. Laurence was the 1998/1999 Chair of the Crime Writers' Association, and has been Chair of a number of CWA award judging panels including in 2007 and 2008 for the CWA Ellis Peters Award for best Historical Crime Novel and in 2013 for the CWA International Award.

== Other work ==
Laurence has written three contemporary women's novels under the pen name Julia Lisle, a book on how to write cookery books, and a book on how to write crime fiction.

== Bibliography ==
=== Contemporary crime fiction ===
==== Darina Lisle/William Pigram novels ====
- A Deepe Coffyn (1989)
- A Tasty Way to Die (1990)
- Hotel Morgue (1991)
- Recipe for Death (1992)
- Death and the Epicure (1993)
- Death at the Table (1994)
- Death a la Provencale (1995)
- Diet for Death (1996)
- Appetite for Death (1998)
- The Mermaid's Feast (2000)

==== Felicity Freer novel ====
- To Kill the Past (1994)

=== Historical crime fiction ===
==== Canaletto novels ====
- Canaletto and the Case of Westminster Bridge (1997)
- Canaletto and the Case of the Privy Garden (1999)
- Canaletto and the Case of Bonnie Prince Charlie (2002)

==== Ursula Grandison novels ====
- Deadly Inheritance (2012)
- A Fatal Freedom (2015)

=== Contemporary women's fiction ===
(writing as Julia Lisle)

- A Perfect Match (1996)
- The Changing Years (1996)
- Journeys from Home (1997)

=== Cookery books ===
- A Little French Cookbook (1989) (with Diana Leadbetter)
- A Little Scandinavian Cookbook (1990) (with Agnetha Petersen)
- A Little Coffee Cookbook (1992) (with Catherine McWilliams)
- Just for Two (1992)
- The Food and Cooking of Norway: Traditions, Ingredients, Tastes, Techniques and Over 60 Classic Recipes (2007)
- The Food and Cooking of Scandinavia: 150 Authentic Regional Recipes (2011) (with Anna Mossesson and Judith Dern)
- A Taste of Scandinavia: The Real Food and Cooking of Sweden, Norway and Denmark (2013) (with Anna Mossesson and Judith Dern)
- The Scandinavian Cookbook: Fresh and Fragrant Cooking of Sweden, Denmark and Norway (2014) (with Anna Mossesson and Judith Dern)

=== Writing guides ===
- The Craft of Food and Cookery Writing (1994)
- Writing Crime Fiction – Making Crime Pay (2007)

=== Publications abroad ===
Germany, Austria, Switzerland

- Mord extra scharf, 2017 dp DIGITAL PUBLISHERS, ISBN 9783960874133
- Mord gut abgeschmeckt, 2017 dp DIGITAL PUBLISHERS, ISBN 9783960875635
- Mord Well Done, 2017 dp DIGITAL PUBLISHERS, ISBN 9783960875642
- Mord nach Rezept, 2018 dp DIGITAL PUBLISHERS, ISBN 9783960875659
- Mord für Feinschmecker, 2018 dp DIGITAL PUBLISHERS, ISBN 9783960873495
- Mord zur Primetime, 2018 dp DIGITAL PUBLISHERS, ISBN 9783960874157
- Mord a ka provencale, 2018 dp DIGITAL PUBLISHERS, ISBN 9783960874171
- Mord ohne Kalorien, 2018 dp DIGITAL PUBLISHERS, ISBN 9783960874409
- Mord macht Appetit, 2018 dp DIGITAL PUBLISHERS, ISBN 9783960874768
- Mord mit Fischgeschmack, 2018 dp DIGITAL PUBLISHERS, ISBN 9783960875789
