= National Palace (Haiti) =

Former official residence of the president of Haiti

- Palais national
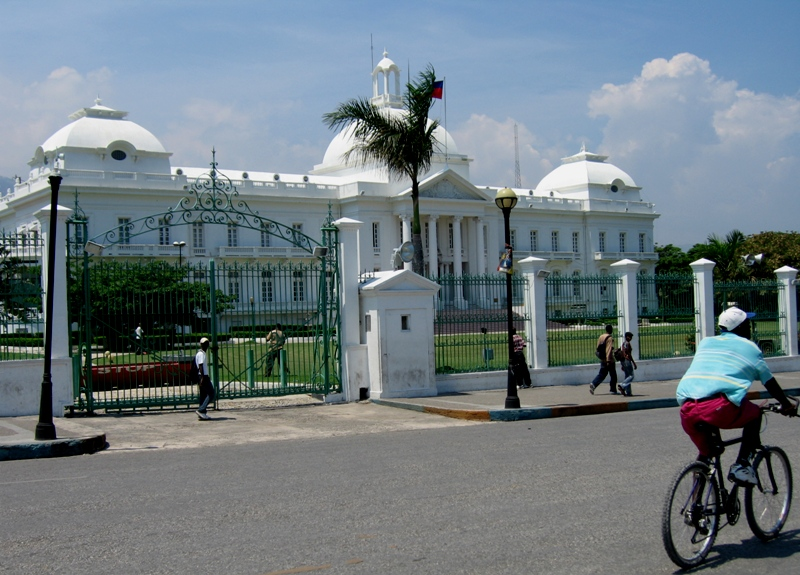
- The National Palace of Haiti in 2006, four years prior to its collapse
- Former names: Imperial Palace

General information
- Status: Destroyed
- Type: Executive
- Architectural style: Victorian
- Location: Champs-de-Mars, 6110 Avenue de la Republique, Port-au-Prince, Haiti
- Coordinates: 18°32′35.2″N 072°20′19.9″W
- Construction started: May 1914
- Completed: January 1920
- Destroyed: January 12, 2010; 16 years ago
- Cost: $350,000

Design and construction
- Architect: Georges Baussan

A 2010 map of Port-au-Prince, showing the location of the National Palace, which is labeled Palais National

The National Palace (French: Palais national; Haitian Creole: Palè nasyonal) was the official residence of the president of Haiti, located in the capital Port-au-Prince, facing Place L'Ouverture near the Champs de Mars. It was severely damaged during the 2010 Haiti earthquake. The ruins of the building were demolished in 2012 under the Martelly administration, and plans to rebuild the palace were announced by then-president Jovenel Moïse in 2017, but construction has never begun. The palace's grounds and ancillary buildings have nonetheless remained a center of governmental administration.

== History ==
=== Background ===
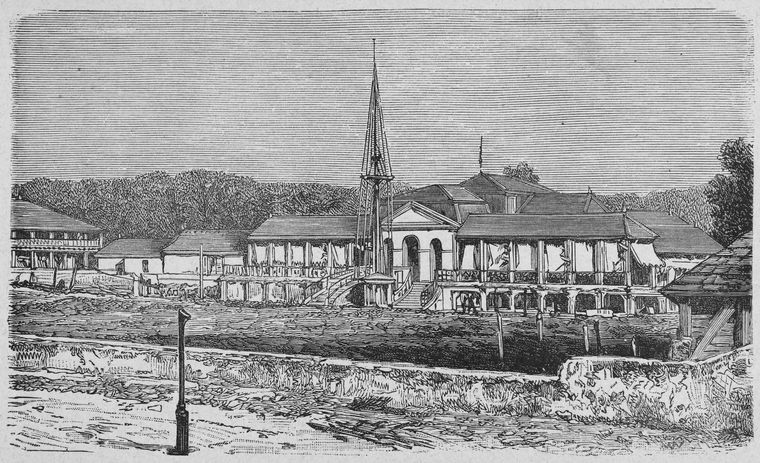
The first National Palace

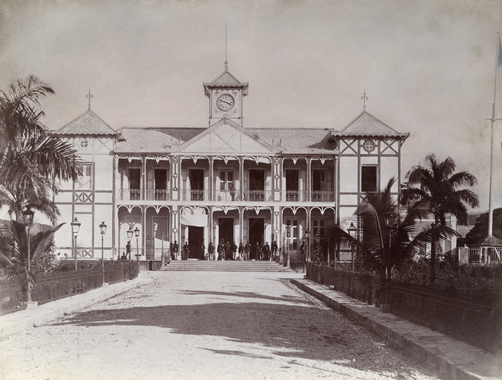
The second National Palace

A reported total of four residences built for the country's rulers, whether the colonial governor general, king, emperor, or president, have occupied the site since the mid to late 18th century. At one point in the site's tumultuous history, when the chief of state was without an official home due to damage, a 19th-century French-style villa on Avenue Christophe assumed that role.

The earliest structure was the Government Palace (Palais du Gouvernement), which was constructed in the 18th century as the residence of the French governor general of Saint-Domingue. Its first Haitian inhabitant was the country's first president, General Alexandre Pétion. The structure was deemed "nothing less than a palace", made of painted wood, with "a handsome flight of steps leading into good reception-rooms". A visitor in 1831 noted the building was "large and convenient, but not handsome. It is of one story, and situated in front of the parade, to the southeast of the town. Its entrance is up a fine flight of steps, leading through a spacious portico into the hall of audience. The floors of all the public rooms are of black and white marble. The furniture is tasteful and elegant, but not costly. This building ... was constructed with more attention to convenience than effect. The apartments are pleasantly cool." In front of the palace stood the marble tomb of President Pétion and one of his daughters.

By 1850, the former governor general's residence had become known as the Imperial Palace, since it was the residence of Emperor Faustin I of Haiti and his wife, Empress Adélina. John Bigelow, an editor at the New York Evening Post, visited the palace in 1850 and described it as "only one story, raised a few feet from the ground, and approached by four or five steps, which extend all around the edifice." He also noted aspects of the interior decoration: "The floor [of one waiting room] is white marble, the furniture in black hair-cloth and straw. On a richly carved table appeared a beautiful bronze clock, representing the arms of Haiti—namely, a palm-tree surrounded with fascines of pikes and surmounted with the Phrygian cap. The walls were decorated with two fine portraits ... One represents the celebrated French conventionist, the Abbé Grégoire, and the other the reigning Emperor of Haiti .... The latter does honor to the talent of a mulatto artist, the Baron Colbert." An adjoining salon, where "grand receptions are given," displayed "portraits of all the great men of Haiti".

The former Imperial Palace was destroyed on 19 December 1869 during a revolt that brought down the government of President Sylvain Salnave. The building was bombarded during the conflict by the man-of-war La Terreur, a government warship that had been captured by the rebel forces. As a contemporary report stated, "It appeared that Salnave had stowed away in vaults at the Palace a large quantity of ammunition. The shells fired from the Terreur, penetrating these vaults, caused several terrific explosions, and the palace was wholly destroyed". Salnave succeeded in reaching the Dominican territory. On January 15, 1870, Salnave arrived at Port-au-Prince, where he appeared before a court martial. He was sentenced to death and shot on the same day.

The palace's replacement was built in 1881. National Geographic called the palace "a rather ugly structure of glistening gray white, with apparently a good deal of corrugated iron about it," though adding that it "contained, however, some fine lofty rooms". Others called it "a low straggling house" whose rooms were "pretty and decorated à la française". The replacement palace was seriously damaged on 8 August 1912 by a violent explosion that killed President Cincinnatus Leconte and several hundred of his soldiers almost a year to the day from Leconte's election. "The President had been unable to trust anyone with the keeping of the national supply of ammunition and was forced to keep it in his own palace", and died as a result.

=== Design ===
Georges H. Baussan, architect of the 1920 National Palace, as shown in the year it was built

The National Palace most recently occupying the site was designed in 1912 by Georges Baussan (1874–1958), a leading Haitian architect who graduated from the Ecole d'Architecture in Paris and whose commissions included the City Hall of Port-au-Prince and Haiti's Supreme Court Building. He was a son of a former Haitian senator and the father of Robert Baussan, an architect who studied under Le Corbusier and later became the country's Undersecretary of State for Tourism. Baussan's classical design was chosen from a range of plans submitted by Haitian and French architects in a national competition in 1912. His entry was awarded the second-place prize but also was selected to be the new National Palace, for financial reasons—the structure proposed by the first-place winner was deemed too costly. The construction budget for the new palace was set at $350,000 and work began in May 1914. By 1915, however, the under-construction palace was set ablaze by a mob that ousted and assassinated President Vilbrun Guillaume Sam. A contemporary news report stated the palace "has been partially destroyed after an early-morning attack which lasted several hours". After President Sam's death, the country was occupied by the United States, with U.S. forces taking possession of the palace and U.S. naval engineers overseeing its completion. The building was finished in 1920.

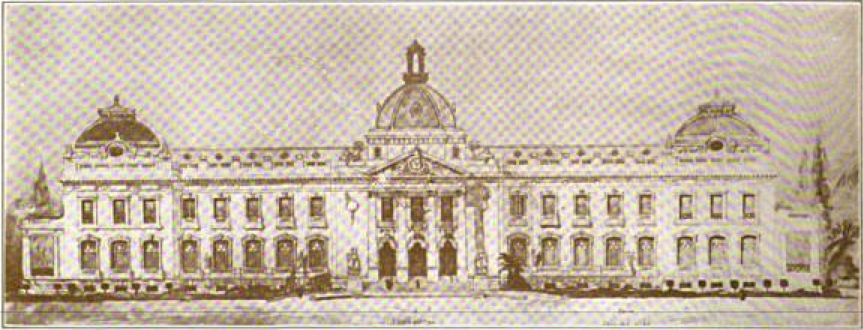
Georges H. Baussan's 1912 design for the National Palace of Haiti

John Dryden Kuser, a wealthy American who visited Haiti in January 1920, described the new National Palace as "a huge structure, quite like a palace in appearance .... It is more than twice the size of our White House and is shaped like the letter E, with the three wings running back from the front. In the main hall huge columns rise to the ceiling and at each side a staircase winds up to the second floor". The primary rooms, Kuser noted, including the office of the president, were all about 40 feet square.

Like other public buildings in Haiti, Baussan's National Palace drew on the tradition of French Renaissance architecture and greatly resembled structures erected in France and its colonial territories during the late 19th century, such as the Saigon Governor's Palace, the residence of the French governor general of Cochinchina. Made of white-painted reinforced concrete, the two-story National Palace had a central section featuring a domed entrance pavilion whose four Ionic columns supported a pedimented portico; at either end of the main façade were matching domed pavilions, also groined. The presidents and their families lived in the south wing of the building.

=== Earthquake damage ===
On January 12, 2010, the National Palace was severely damaged by a magnitude 7.0 earthquake centered about 16 kilometres (10 mi) away from Port-au-Prince. The collapsed cupola has become a symbol of the devastated quake-hit nation. The second floor of the building collapsed almost completely, taking the attic floor with it; the palace's columned central pavilion, a section containing the main hall and primary staircase, was entirely demolished. At the time of the earthquake, President René Préval and his wife, Elisabeth Delatour Préval, were at their private residence in another part of Port-au-Prince.

France offered to rebuild the presidential palace, but in April 2010, the Haitian government announced plans to demolish the palace in preparation for reconstruction. Demolition and clearance of the site took place between September and December 2012.

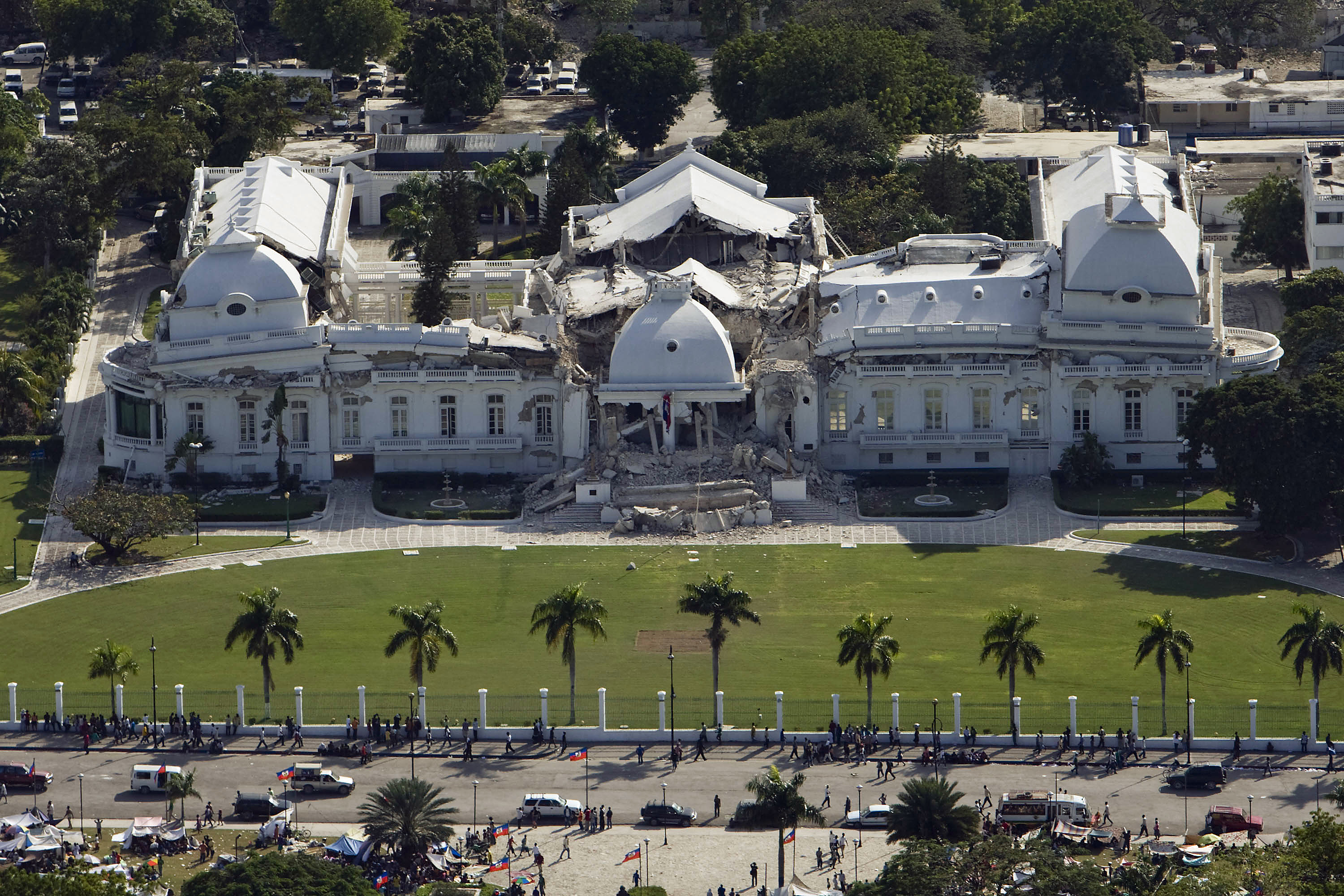
The National Palace after the 2010 Haiti earthquake

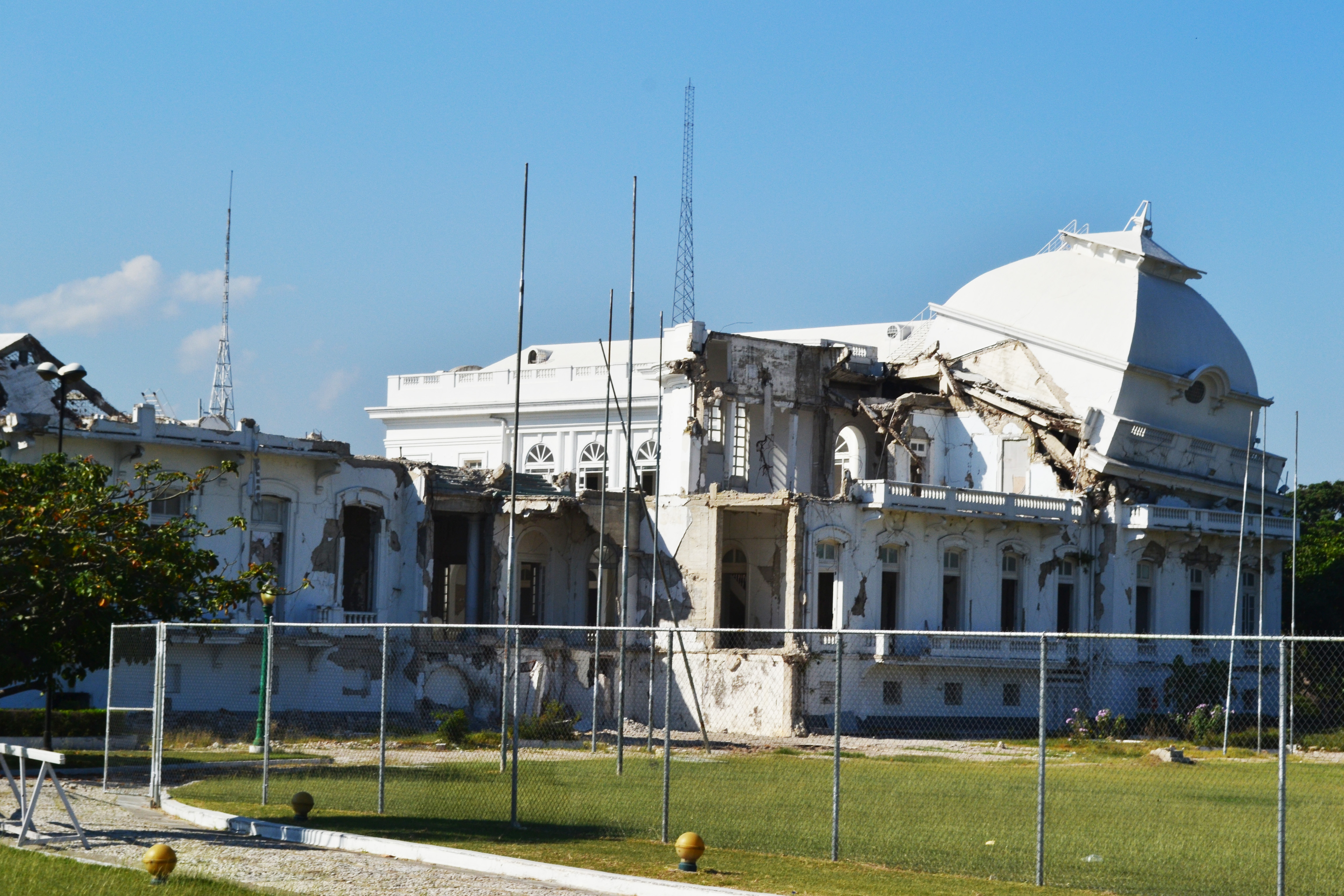
Closeup of the National Palace in ruins, in 2012

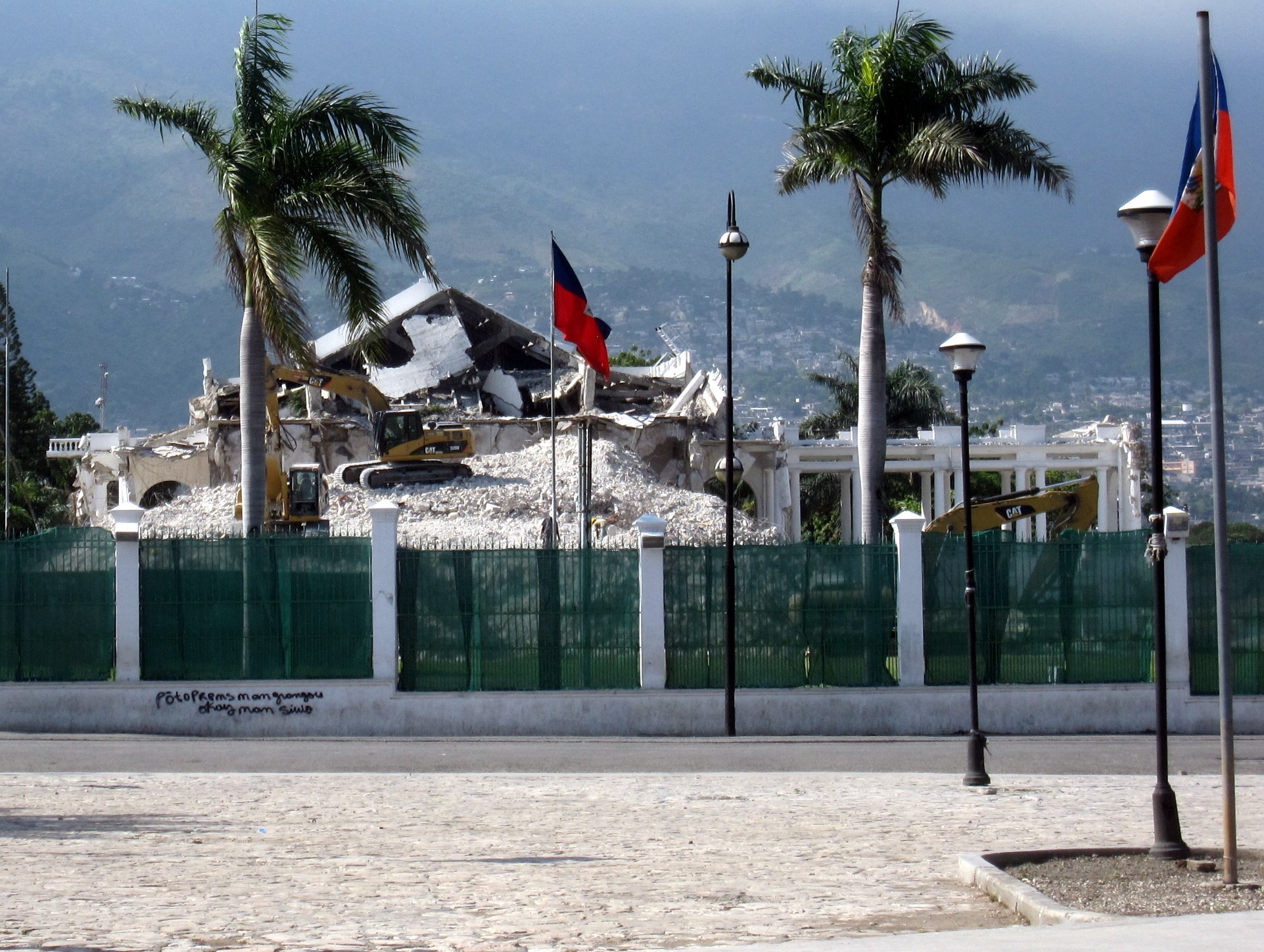
The National Palace being demolished in late 2012

=== Temporary residence ===
President Moïse's personal residence on Pelerin 5 south of Pétion-Ville was used as the de facto presidential palace, but he relocated to another home in the Juventas area.

=== Reconstruction ===
A little more than two months after taking the presidency, President Jovenel Moïse announced on April 19, 2017, that they will be commencing the rehabilitation of the National Palace. He presented a committee of engineers and architects who will analyze the project as well as its construction. Moïse stated that the palace's exterior will look the same, but the interior will be modernized to fit the needs of a head of state in the coming years and the building must be earthquake-resistant.

While reconstruction has not yet begun as of January 2026, the grounds of the National Palace remain the official home of the Haitian government. However, gang activity in downtown Port-au-Prince has forced the Transitional Presidential Council to mostly operate out of the Prime Minister's office. The grounds have been repeatedly menaced by Jimmy Chérizier's Viv Ansanm in 2025 and 2026 while members of the council were present, prompting calls for increased security and skepticism surrounding the Haitian National Police contingent charged with guarding the palace grounds.

== See also ==
- National Museum of Haiti
