= Rotha Johnston =

Northern Irish entrepreneur and public service director

Dame Rotha Geraldine Diane Johnston, DBE (born August 1959) is a Northern Irish entrepreneur in commerce and property. Johnston is chair of Northern Ireland Screen, a non-executive director of Northern Ireland Electricity and an independent board member of the Department of Justice and Belfast Harbour Commissioners.

Johnston, a native of West Belfast who attended St Dominic's Grammar School, is a non-executive Director of Allied Irish Bank and Deputy Chair of Invest Northern Ireland. She is a non-executive member of the Northern Ireland Office and Pro Chancellor at Queen's University Belfast.

== BBC ==
On 1 November 2006 Johnston was appointed as one of the founding members of the BBC Trust, which along with a formal executive board replaced the former BBC Board of Governors as the governing body of the BBC. Her term expired on 31 October 2010. Until late 2012, Johnston served as BBC National Trustee for Northern Ireland and chaired the BBC Audience Council Northern Ireland, which advises the BBC Trust on the views of Northern Irish licence fee payers.

She was also the chair of the Trust's Finance and Compliance Committee. She was replaced by Aideen McGinley, a former Chief Executive of Ilex.

== Honours ==
Johnston was appointed Commander of the Order of the British Empire (CBE) in the 2006 New Year Honours and Dame Commander of the Order of the British Empire (DBE) in the 2016 Birthday Honours for services to the Northern Ireland economy and public service.
