= Marlys Millhiser =

American novelist

Marlys Joy Millhiser (May 27, 1938 – April 20, 2017) was an American author of mysteries (the Charlie Greene series) and horror novels, including her most famous one The Mirror, published in 1978. She was also the author of The Threshold, Michael's Wife, Nella Waits, and Willing Hostage.

Millhiser originally worked as a high school teacher, and was regional vice president of the Mystery Writers of America. She lived in Boulder, Colorado. She died on April 20, 2017.
