= Jean Hager =

American writer (born 1932)

- Born: Jean Wilma Hager; June 2, 1932 (age 94); Maywood, Illinois
- Education: Oklahoma State University, 1950–53; University of Tulsa, 1964–66; Central State University, B.A., 1969; University of Oklahoma, graduate study, 1969–70
- Occupations: Writer of mysteries and romance novels
- Spouses: Kenneth C. Hager (1953)
- Writing career
- Pen name: Leah Crane, Marlaine Kyle, Amanda McAllister, Sara North, Jeanne Stephens
- Notable awards: Oklahoma Writers Federation Teepee Award (five times); Oklahoma Writer of the Year (1982); Oklahoma Professional Writers Hall of Fame (1992)

Jean Hager (born June 2, 1932) is an American writer of mystery fiction, children's fiction, and romance novels. She has published romance novels under the pseudonyms Jeanne Stephens, Leah Crane, Marlaine Kyle, Amanda McAllister, and Sara North, as well as in her own name. Two of her three mystery series involve modern Cherokee life in Oklahoma and feature either police chief Mitch Bushyhead or civil rights investigator Molly Bearpaw. The third series is set in Iris House, a bed and breakfast establishment in Missouri that features amateur sleuth Tess Darcy.

Hager attended Oklahoma State University from 1950 to 1953, the University of Tulsa from 1964 to 1966, completed a B.A. at Central State University in Edmond, Oklahoma, in 1969, and did graduate study at the University of Oklahoma in 1969–70. After teaching high school English from 1970 through 1974, she turned to full-time writing in 1975.

She won the Oklahoma Writers Federation Teepee Award five times, was named Oklahoma Writer of the Year in 1982, and was inducted into the Oklahoma Professional Writers Hall of Fame in 1992. Her professional memberships have included Mystery Writers of America, Sisters in Crime, and American Crime Writers.

== Critical reception ==
Jean Swanson in St. James Guide to Crime and Mystery Writers said in 1996 that the Mitch Bushyhead books are essentially Cherokee-related police procedurals and that the Molly Bearpaw series focuses more on Cherokee culture than the Bushyhead series. The Iris House books belong to a subcategory of mysteries known as "cozies".

Of the Bushyhead mystery The Grandfather Medicine, a reviewer for Publishers Weekly said, "The prose here is serviceable and the puzzle smoothly concocted and solved." The Publishers Weekly review for The Redbird's Cry, a Molly Bearpaw mystery, said, "Although the politics are sometimes cursorily handled, Hager explores the Cherokee culture with trenchant compassion rather than overcareful reverence and deftly inserts hairpin turns into the narrative."

Publishers Weekly treated her Molly Bearpaw series more positively than did Kirkus Reviews, calling it an entertaining series and saying that the writer "captures the rhythms of life in Tahlequah and creates in Bearpaw a charming and intelligent--albeit reluctant--detective." Kirkus praised her plotting but noted a lack of "motivation" for the murders themselves. About her 1994 book The Redbird's Cry, Kirkus said it was not a match for her Bushyhead adventures, as it was slow-moving and "padded" with chatter and romances. Kirkus wrote for the 1995 book Seven Black Stones that "While the chilly disharmonies of failing marriages get sensitive treatment here," the murder plot seems "undermotivated." Her 1996 book The Fire Carrier was called "labored" and "not one of Hager's better efforts" by Kirkus. Kirkus called her 1997 book The Spirit Caller "tidily plotted and mildly entertaining, with special appeal to aficionados of Native American lore", and her 1998 book Masked Dancers "tidily plotted but uncompellingly motivated."

== Bibliography ==
=== Mystery novels ===
For children

- The Secret of Riverside Farm (1970) ISBN 978-0-8114-7708-6
- The Whispering House (1970) ISBN 978-0-8114-7703-1

For adults

- Terror in the Sunlight (1976) OCLC 495913317
- Yellow-Flower Moon (1981) ISBN 978-0-385-17324-7
- Captured by Love (1982) ISBN 978-0-440-11122-1
- The Grandfather Medicine (1989) ISBN 978-0-312-02923-4
- Night Walker (1990) ISBN 978-0-312-05138-9
- Ravenmocker (1992) ISBN 978-0-446-40107-4
- Ghostland (1992) ISBN 978-0-312-06982-7
- The Redbird's Cry (1994) ISBN 978-0-446-40106-7
- Blooming Murder (1994) ISBN 978-0-380-77209-4
- Seven Black Stones (1995) ISBN 978-0-89296-565-6
- Dead and Buried (1995) ISBN 978-0-380-77210-0
- Death on the Drunkard's Path (1996) ISBN 978-0-380-77211-7
- The Fire Carrier (1996) ISBN 978-0-446-40387-0
- The Last Noel (1997) ISBN 978-0-380-78637-4
- The Spirit Caller (1997) ISBN 978-0-446-60595-3
- Masked Dancers (1998) ISBN 978-0-89296-641-7
- Weigh Dead (1999) ISBN 978-0-380-80375-0
- Sew Deadly (2000) ISBN 978-0-380-78638-1
- Bride and Doom (2001) ISBN 978-0-380-80376-7

=== Romance novels ===
As Jean Hager

- Terror in the Sunlight (1977) OCLC 495913317
- Web of Desire (1981) ISBN 978-0-440-19434-7
- Portrait of Love (1981) ISBN 978-0-440-17013-6
- Secret Intentions (1985) ISBN 978-0-440-17632-9
- The Passionate Solution (1986) ISBN 978-0-440-16777-8

As Amanda McAllister

- No Need for Fear (1976) OCLC 7602615
- Trust No One at All (1976) OCLC 1090874264
- Waiting for Caroline (1976) OCLC 1090842242
- Pretty Enough to Kill (1976) OCLC 1090908467

As Sara North

- Jasmine for My Grave (1978) ISBN 978-0-87216-494-9
- Evil Side of Eden (1978) ISBN 978-0-87216-451-2
- Shadow of the Tamaracks (1979) ISBN 978-0-87216-553-3

As Jeanne Stephens

- Mexican Nights (1980) ISBN 978-0-340-26443-0
- Wonder and Wild Desire (1981) ISBN 978-0-671-57080-4
- Bride in Barbados (1982) ISBN 978-0-340-32616-9
- Sweet Jasmine (1982) ISBN 978-0-671-57189-4
- The Splendored Sky (1983) ISBN 978-0-671-53584-1
- No Other Love (1983) ISBN 978-0-671-53608-4
- Reckless Surrender (1983) ISBN 978-0-671-47136-1
- Memories (1984) ISBN 978-0-671-47138-5
- Mandy's Song (1985) ISBN 978-0-373-09217-8
- Coming Home (1985) ISBN 978-0-373-09252-9
- This Long Winter Past (1986) ISBN 978-0-373-09295-6
- Whispers on the Wind (1986) ISBN 978-0-373-07127-2
- A Few Shining Hours (1986) ISBN 978-0-373-50436-7
- Long Winter Past (1986) ISBN 978-0-373-09295-6
- Return to Eden (1987) ISBN 978-0-373-09372-4
- Neptune Summer (1987) ISBN 978-0-373-50839-6
- Dangerous Choices (1988) ISBN 978-0-373-07259-0
- Sharing California (1989) ISBN 978-0-373-57716-3
- Wild Horizons (1989) ISBN 978-0-373-28618-8
- At Risk (1989) ISBN 978-0-373-07308-5
- Hiding Places (1990) ISBN 978-0-373-07353-5
- Summer Heat (1991) ISBN 978-0-373-07380-1

As Marlaine Kyle

- A Suitable Marriage (1982) ISBN 978-0-440-18406-5

As Leah Crane

- Dark Ecstasy (1983) ISBN 978-0-373-70066-0

=== Other ===
As Jean Hager

- How to Write & Market Your Mystery Novel: A Step-by-Step Guide from Idea to Final Rewrite and Marketing (1998) ISBN 978-0-9662145-0-5
