= 2027 Haitian general election =

- 18 July 2027
- Presidential election
Incumbent President
Vacant
- Parliamentary election
- All 119 seats in the Chamber of Deputies; All 30 seats in the Senate
Prime Minister before
Alix Didier Fils-Aimé (acting)

General elections are scheduled to be held in Haiti on 18 July 2027. The presidency, all seats in the Senate and the Chamber of Deputies, all seats in departmental assemblies, and municipal offices will be contested.

The elections have been repeatedly delayed since 2019; through the presidency of Jovenel Moïse, the acting premiership of Ariel Henry, the leadership of the Transitional Presidential Council, and the acting premiership of Alix Didier Fils-Aimé.

== Background ==
=== Presidency of Jovenel Moïse ===
The most recent Haitian elections were held in 2015 and 2016, which were marred with allegations of widespread fraud. Jovenel Moïse was inaugurated as president on 7 February 2017 after an electoral tribunal had found evidence of "some irregularities" but not enough to change the outcome of the November 2016 election. The next parliamentary election had been scheduled for 27 October 2019, but was delayed, and Moïse ruled by presidential decree after dismissing many lawmakers in 2020. In 2021, mass street demonstrations and violent protest marches began across Haiti on 14 January in protest at his plan to stay one more year in power. Moïse was assassinated by gunmen at his home in Port-au-Prince on 7 July 2021.

=== Acting premiership of Ariel Henry ===
On 8 July, acting prime minister Claude Joseph's office announced that despite the assassination, the parliamentary elections would still be held on the date set by the Provisional Electoral Council and that members of the opposition would be included in election timetable talks. Ariel Henry was appointed as acting prime minister later that month, though he was never confirmed by the parliament. Elections were due to be held on 26 September 2021, before being delayed to 7 November 2021.

In 2022, Henry stated that the government would begin the organization of elections by the end of 2022, but was delayed to 2023. There were no elected officials left in the country after January 2023, leaving all power to acting prime minister Henry. In March 2024, Henry agreed to resign once the Transitional Presidential Council was formed after being prevented from returning to Haiti due to gangs controlling much of Port-au-Prince.

=== Transitional Presidential Council ===
In April 2024, the Transitional Presidential Council was formed, with a mandate until 7 February 2026. In January 2025, Leslie Voltaire, the chairman of the Transitional Presidential Council, said that two-round general elections will be held on 15 November 2025 and in early January 2026. However, in October 2025, the head of the Provisional Electoral Council, Jacques Desrosiers, announced that holding an election before February 2026 is "impossible" due to the ongoing gang violence and a lack of funding.

On 14 November, the Provisional Electoral Council submitted a new election calendar and a list of steps to be implemented over the following months before elections can be held. The election campaign began in March 2026, with electoral lists to be published on 31 July 2026, the first round of voting to be held on 30 August 2026, the second round on 6 December 2026, and the inauguration of a new president on 7 February 2027. The proposal was approved by the Transitional Presidential Council on 1 December 2025.

=== Acting premiership of Alix Didier Fils-Aimé ===
After the mandate of the Transitional Presidential Council expired on 7 February 2026, the "National Pact for Stability and the Organization of Elections" was signed by several political parties and civil society groups to support acting prime minister Alix Didier Fils-Aimé as the sole executive of Haiti until elections are held. On 27 February, the Provisional Electoral Council announced it would register political parties for the elections from 2–12 March. A list of 282 political parties approved to run in the election was published on 20 March, with the window for party registration remaining open until 1 April. Candidate registration was planned for 13 April to 15 May. However, it was delayed after the government paused the electoral process after rejecting the budget requested by the electoral council. Fils-Aimé said that the government still plans to hold elections before the end of the year to install elected officials by 7 February 2027, and that the first round may be delayed until December 2026.

On 20 July 2026, the Provisional Electoral Council launched voter registration in nine of Haiti's ten departments, excluding Ouest (the region of Port-au-Prince) because of instability. Shortly after, the council set the new date for the first round of the general elections as 13 December 2026 and runoffs on 21 February, with the final results to be announced on 7 March and a government inaugurated on 12 March 2027. The council began registering voters in Ouest on 30 July. On 29 October 2026, the Provisional Electoral Council announced that two-round general elections will be held on 18 July 2027, with the second round on 4 October.

== Electoral system ==
The President of Haiti is elected using the two-round system, with a second round held if no candidate wins a majority of the vote in the first round.

The 119 members of the Chamber of Deputies are elected in single-member constituencies for four-year terms using a modified two-round system; a candidate must receive either over 50% of the vote, or have a lead over the second-placed candidate equivalent to 25% of the valid votes in order to be elected in the first round; if no candidate meets this requirement, a second round is held, in which the candidate with the most votes wins.

One third of the 30-member Senate is elected every two years. The members are elected from ten single-member constituencies based on the departments, also using the two-round system. For the upcoming election, in each department the candidate with the largest number of votes will serve a six-year term, the second place finisher will serve four years, and the third place for two years.

== Presidential candidates ==
=== Declared ===
- Gary Bodeau (Rekonsilye), President of the Chamber of Deputies (2018–2020); Deputy for Delmas (2016–2023)
- Gandy Dorfeuille (Together We Are Strong)
- Ricardo Jean-Pierre (Haitian Nationalist Party)
- Wilson Jeudy (Vision-Action-Réalisation), Mayor of Delmas (2006–present)
- Claude Joseph (Les Engagés pour le Développement), Acting Prime Minister (2021); Minister of Foreign Affairs and Worship (2020–2021)
- Wilner Joseph (Viktwa), former Secretary of State for Population (2020-2021) and candidate for Port-au-Prince's 3rd constituency in 2015
- Michel Martelly (Debloke), President of Haiti (2011–2016)
- Joseph Maxo (Awakening of Haitian Citizens), pastor and November 2016 presidential candidate
- Martine Moïse (Gwoupman Angaje Pou Demokrasi), First Lady (2017–2021)
- Munir Joseph Moura (Mobilization for the Progress of Haiti)
- Jocelerme Privert (Transform Haiti), Interim President (2016–2017); President of the Senate (2016); Senator for Nippes (2011–2016)
Mayor of Delmas
Wilson Jeudy
(2006–present)

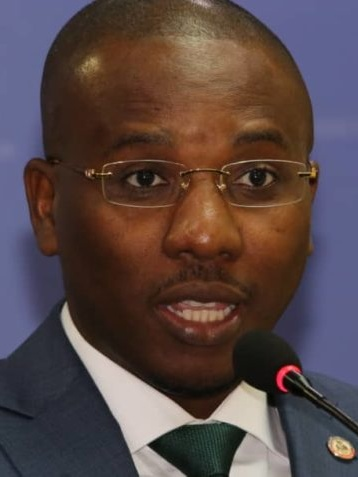
Acting Prime Minister
Claude Joseph
(2021)

President
Michel Martelly
(2011–2016)

First Lady
Martine Moïse
(2017–2021)

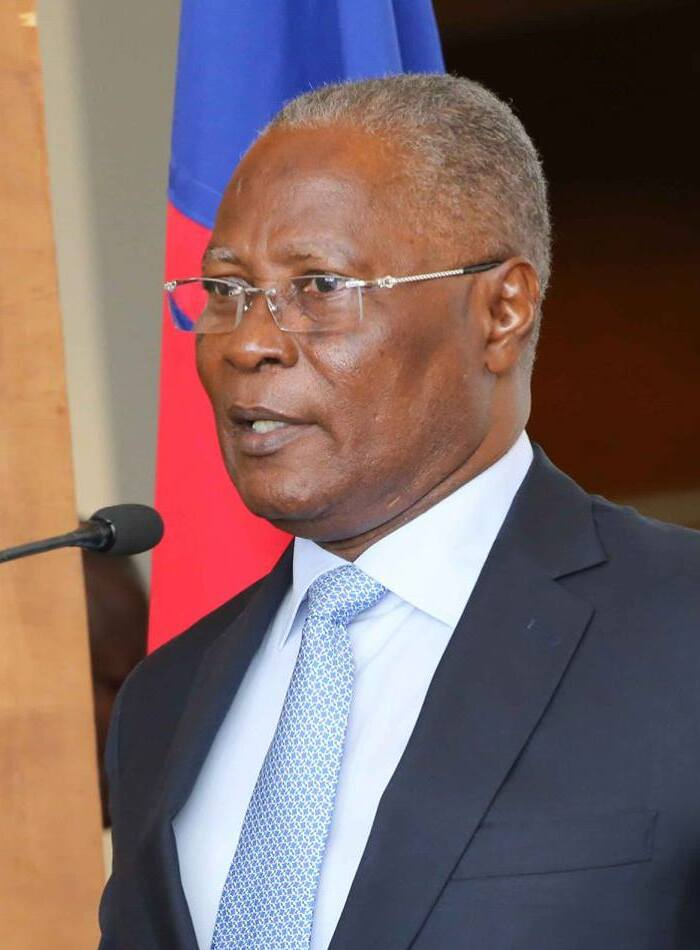
Interim President
Jocelerme Privert
(2016–2017)

== Political parties and lists ==
A total of 320 political parties registered for the election with the Provisional Electoral Council, with a final list of approved parties and coalitions to be published on 26 March 2026. A list of 282 parties that were approved was released on 20 March. On 9 July, the electoral council officially approved 316 out of 320 parties that registered for the election. The following parties were rejected from running candidates: National Movement for the Prosperity of Haiti (MONAPHA), the Nationalist Christian Party of Haiti (PNCH), the Liberal Republican Party–Centrist Bloc (LR Bloc Centriste), and Haiti Tomorrow Together (AYIDA).

Below is a list of major parties and alliances which contested the previous election and new major parties and alliances expected to contest the 2026 election:

Candidacy	Parties and alliances	Leading candidate (Note: The leading candidate is either the leader of the party/alliance or a candidate designated by the party to lead its campaign.)	Ideology	Previous result (Note: Vote percentage from second round of voting, unless stated otherwise.)				Gov. (Note: Participation in government is based on the period before the expiration of all mandates on 10 January 2023.)	Ref.
Candidacy	Parties and alliances	Leading candidate	Ideology	Chamber		Senate		Gov.	Ref.
Candidacy	Parties and alliances	Leading candidate	Ideology	Vote %	Seats	Vote %	Seats	Gov.	Ref.
OPL	List: Struggling People's Organization (OPL)	Edgard Leblanc Fils	Social democracy Neoliberalism; Populism	7.69%	9	3.17%	1	No	
FANMI; LAVALAS	List: Lavalas Family (FANMI LAVALAS)	Jean-Bertrand Aristide	Social democracy Populism	9.57%	7	5.43%	1	No	
AAA	List: Haiti in Action (AAA)	Youri Latortue	Right-wing populism Nationalism; Cultural conservatism	2.86%	5	4.15%	1	No	
INITE	List: Patriotic Unity (INITE)	Fritz Jean	Progressivism; Social democracy Liberal conservatism	2.48%	5	1.51%	1	No	
LAPEH	List: Alternative League for Haitian Progress and Emancipation (LAPEH)	Jude Célestin	Liberal conservatism	3.35%	4	1.26%	0	No	
PFSDH	List: Fusion of Haitian Social Democrats (PFSDH)	Edmonde S. Beauzile	Social democracy Third Way	2.02%	4	3.02% (Note: Result from first round rerun; did not make it to the second round.)	0	No	
RA	List: Renmen Ayiti (RA)	Jean-Henry Céant	Centrism; Social democracy	1.90%	3	2.32%	0	No	
PPD	List: Platfòm Pitit Desalin (PPD)	Jean-Charles Moïse	Dessalinism; Democratic socialism Left-wing populism	2.05%	2	3.79%	1	No	
EA	List: En Avant Haiti (EA)	Jerry Tardieu	Anti-corruption	Did not contest				No	
EDE	List: Les Engagés pour le Développement (EDE)	Claude Joseph	Centrism; Syncretism	Did not contest				No	
FREN	List: Revolutionary Force of National Accord (FREN)	Guy Philippe	Nationalism; Social justice	Did not contest				No	
INIFOS	List: Inifos (INIFOS)	Serge Vincent	Social democracy Anti-corruption; Democratic constitutionalism	Did not contest				No	
JK	List: Jenès Konsyan Angaje Pou Chanjman (JK)	Roosevelt Noel	Centrism; Social democracy Youth politics	Did not contest				No	
Not contesting
PTHK	List: Haitian Tèt Kale Party (PTHK)	Liné Balthazar	Liberalism; Conservative liberalism	19.57%	31	19.50%	5	Yes	(Note: Party does not appear on the list of registered political parties.)
VÉRITÉ	List: Truth Platform (VÉRITÉ)	René Préval†	Social democracy Liberal conservatism	19.34%	18	34.46%	3	No	
UNCRH	List: Christian National Union for the Reconstruction of Haiti (UNCRH)	Charles-Henri Baker	Christian democracy Protectionism; Right-wing populism	0.56%	0	Did not contest		No	

== See also ==
- 2021–25 Haitian constitutional referendum attempt
