= Politics of Haiti =

The politics of Haiti takes place in the framework of a unitary semi-presidential republic, where the president is the head of state and the prime minister is the head of government. The politics of Haiti are considered historically unstable due to various coups d'état, regime changes, military juntas and internal conflicts. After Jean-Bertrand Aristide was deposed, Haitian politics became relatively stable. The Economist Intelligence Unit rated Haiti an "authoritarian regime" in 2022. In 2023, the V-Dem Democracy indices determined Haiti to be the fourth least electorally democratic country in Latin America.

Political corruption is widespread in Haiti and it has consistently ranked as one of the most corrupt nations according to the Corruption Perceptions Index, a measure of perceived political corruption. In 2006, Haiti was ranked as the most corrupt nation out of the 163 that were surveyed for the index. In 2020, Haiti was #170 out of 180. The International Red Cross reported that Haiti was 155th out of 159 countries in a similar survey of corrupt countries. In 2013, Haiti ranked #8 in the Fragile States Index.

== History ==
Haiti overthrew French colonial rule in a successful slave revolt (Haitian Revolution) that ended in 1804. Under the Haitian Constitution, the President of Haiti is elected by popular vote for a five-year term. The President cannot stand for two consecutive terms.

Jean-Bertrand Aristide was elected overwhelmingly as president for a third time at the 2000 election held on 26 November 2000, an election boycotted by most opposition political parties, and sworn in on 4 February 2001. Aristide, a left wing president, was deposed in a coup d'état on 29 February 2004, led by the Group of 184, allegedly with assistance of the French, Canadian, and United States governments, on the basis that U.S. and French soldiers had recently arrived in Haiti, ostensibly to protect the U.S. embassy in Haiti. (See controversy regarding US involvement.)

The first election after the 2004 Haitian coup d'état for a new president was held on 8 February 2006 with the runoff election on 21 April. René Préval was declared the winner on 14 May 2006. The 2011 election was held on 28 November 2010 with the runoff election on 20 March 2011. Michel Martelly succeeded Préval when his term expired on 14 May 2011, the first time in Haitian history that an incumbent president peacefully transferred power to a member of the opposition. Martelly's presidency is rated by some as free and by some as authoritarian.

The 2015 presidential election was held on 25 October 2015, but before the runoff, it was criticised by the Haitian public and media as "not-free" and "controlled". According to an exit poll conducted by Haitian Sentinel, only 6% of voters voted for Jovenel Moïse. The other presidential runoff candidate, Jude Célestin, expressed his disapproval of the lack of transparency of the Conseil Electoral Provisoire (Provisional Electoral Council, CEP). Thirty other candidates commented the 2015 election was controlled disregarding public trust. Martelly resigned the presidency on 10 February 2016, amid allegations that the 2015 election was fraudulent, leaving the country without a government in place. The election result was annulled by the CEP.

The Parliament on 13–14 February 2016 elected Jocelerme Privert as provisional president for a period of 120 days, in place of the Council of Ministers. On 14 June 2016, Privert's presidential term expired, but he remained as de facto president as the National Assembly refused to meet to appoint a successor. On 7 February 2017, Privert was succeeded by Moïse who won the 2016 presidential election that was held in November 2016 with the runoff election on 29 January 2017. Since 2018, with no working parliament, Moïse ruled in Haiti by decree. On 7 July 2021, Moïse was assassinated.

Under the Haitian Constitution, the Prime Minister is appointed by the President and must be confirmed by the National Assembly. Yvon Neptune was appointed prime minister on 4 March 2002, but was replaced following the coup of February 2004 by Gérard Latortue, who became interim prime minister. Neptune was imprisoned in June 2004, accused of complicity in an alleged massacre in Saint-Marc. United Nations officials expressed skepticism of the evidence and called for either due process or his release. Neptune was formally charged on 20 September 2005, but was never sent to trial. Jacques-Édouard Alexis became prime minister on 9 June 2006, and Neptune was released on 28 July 2006. In April 2008, Parliament voted to dismiss Alexis following widespread rioting over food prices. His selected replacement was rejected by Parliament, throwing the country into a prolonged period without a government. Michèle Pierre-Louis received approval to become the next prime minister from both houses in July 2008. Moïse appointed seven different prime ministers during his time in office, the last of whom was Ariel Henry, who was appointed on 5 July 2021, but had not been sworn in by the time of Moïse's assassination on 7 July. At the time of Moïse's assassination, Claude Joseph was Haiti's interim prime minister. On 19 July, Joseph relinquished the office of prime minister and Ariel Henry was sworn in on 20 July.

== Summary ==
The lack of voter turnout has been a major issue for Haitian elections, as only approximately 15% of eligible voters will vote in an election. CEP does not release data about turnout in elections, however, according to unofficial population clocks, official census data and electoral data, only 15.94% of Haitians voted in the election. Proper rejection of votes had been a problem lately, as 7.71% of all votes are rejected according to CEP.

== Creole in politics and corruption ==
French has been the primary language in Haitian politics since the colonial era, with Haitian Creole being held in low regard by the nation's ruling class. Haitian Creole is a combination of basic French structures with significant loanwords from African languages, and major differences in grammar and spelling.

This original demotion of the Creole language created socioeconomic barriers for the country's majority which primarily spoke only Haitian Creole.

Today, Creole is spoken by everyone in the country. The upper class and educated people speak both French and Creole. Per the 1987 Constitution, both Creole and French are official languages of Haiti. However, French is still the main language taught in schools and used in politics. With only 2-5% speaking the language of the politics, Creole speakers are politically disenfranchised.

This disenfranchisement is further aggravated by the lack of a systematic educational system. Literacy programs failed in the 1980s, and French is still the language being used to instruct students. Haitian linguist, Yves Dejean, recalls warnings posted in the principal's office forbidding the use of Creole. In the 1970s, only 1% of the children who entered kindergarten stayed on track to obtain state certificate at the end of the sixth grade. Even after the literacy programs of the 1980s, 90% of the teachers ten years after the decree were still not able to fully integrate the Creole language into the education system. The language handicap makes education and furthermore, political enfranchisement almost impossible.

== See also ==
- Elections in Haiti
- Government of Haiti
- List of heads of state of Haiti
