= 2016–17 Haitian Senate election =

- 20 November 2016 (first round); 29 January 2017 (second round)
- 10 of 30 seats in the Senate
Party	Seats
Haitian Tèt Kale Party	5
Rassemblement des Patriotes Haïtiens	1
Reseau National Bouclier	1
Konbit Pou Ayiti	1
Haiti in Action	1
Consortium National des Partis Politiques Haïtiens	1
This lists parties that won seats. See the complete results below.

Senate elections were held in Haiti with a first round on 20 November 2016, and a second on 29 January 2017. The first round was held simultaneously with the presidential elections and the second round of the parliamentary elections that still had a run-off pending in some constituencies since 2015.

On 10 August 2016, authorities published the list of candidates for the renewal for a third of the Senate.

Originally scheduled for 9 October, the elections were postponed until 20 November 2016 because of Hurricane Matthew, and a new date was announced.

== Results ==
Two candidates were elected in the first round of the elections as they obtained an absolute majority or a difference or more than 25% over their immediate runner-up: Wanique Pierre (PHTK) in the Nord-Est constituency and Joseph Lambert (KONA) in the Sud-Est constituency. The other eight remaining constituencies had a run-off to decide the senators elected. Preliminary results were published on 3 February. The final results would be available after a two-week challenge period and the handling of possible cases.

Party	First round			Second round			Total seats
Party	Votes	%	Seats	Votes	%	Seats	Total seats
Haitian Tèt Kale Party	246,668	22.14	1	359,120	35.25	4	5
Fanmi Lavalas	115,378	10.35	0	76,796	7.54	0	0
Platfòm Pitit Desalin	94,091	8.44	0	56,899	5.58	0	0
Rassemblement des Patriotes Haïtiens	67,194	6.03	0	149,918	14.71	1	1
Vérité	67,036	6.02	0				0
Alternative League for Haitian Progress and Emancipation	54,376	4.88	0				0
Reseau National Bouclier	48,214	4.33	0	108,745	10.67	1	1
Konbit Pou Ayiti	44,131	3.96	1				1
Haiti in Action	42,924	3.85	0	87,959	8.63	1	1
Struggling People's Organization	42,485	3.81	0	37,493	3.68	0	0
Konvansyon Inite Demokratik	36,299	3.26	0	52,613	5.16	0	0
Ansanm Patriyot pou Lavni Ayiti	32,620	2.93	0				0
Rally of Progressive National Democrats	31,992	2.87	0				0
Fusion of Haitian Social Democrats	28,320	2.54	0				0
Parti Concorde Nationale	27,369	2.46	0				0
Inite Patriyotik	20,197	1.81	0				0
Consortium National des Partis Politiques Haïtiens	17,271	1.55	0	43,128	4.23	1	1
Mouvement Revolisyone Ayisyen	16,388	1.47	0				0
Mouvement de Solidarite pour l'Avancement d'une Nouvelle Haïti	10,049	0.90	0	25,352	2.49	0	0
Federalist Party	8,357	0.75	0				0
Konbit Travaye Peyizan pou Libere Ayiti	7,391	0.66	0				0
Renmen Ayiti	6,661	0.60	0				0
CANANN	5,261	0.47	0				0
Kombit Liberasyon Ekonomik	4,848	0.44	0				0
Entente Nationale des Travailleurs pour le Reveil d'Haïti	4,318	0.39	0				0
Rassemblement des Nationaux Démocrates Volontaires pour l’Unité Salvatrice	2,557	0.23	0				0
Konbit pou Rekonstwi Haïti	2,450	0.22	0				0
Front Uni pour la Renaissance d'Haïti	2,380	0.21	0				0
MOPANOU	2,279	0.20	0				0
Parti pour la Libération des Masses et l'Intégration Sociale	1,606	0.14	0				0
Force Démocratique Haïtien Intégré	970	0.09	0				0
Fwon Revolisyone pou Entegrasyon Mas Yo	535	0.05	0				0
Independent	4,994	0.45	0				0
None of the above	16,756	1.50	–	20,843	2.05	–	–
Total	1,114,365	100.00	2	1,018,866	100.00	8	10
Valid votes	1,114,365	91.76		1,018,866	89.53		
Invalid/blank votes	100,060	8.24		119,190	10.47		
Total votes	1,214,425	100.00		1,138,056	100.00		

=== By department ===
Artibonite
Candidate	Party	First round		Second round	
Candidate	Party	Votes	%	Votes	%
Garcia Delva	Haiti in Action	37,323	28.46	87,959	53.85
Marc Antoine Aldorphe	Reseau National Bouclier	20,495	15.63	70,354	43.07
Levaillant Louis-Jeune	Inite Patriyotik	16,664	12.71		
Michel Chrysostome	Alternative League for Haitian Progress and Emancipation	15,978	12.18		
Patrick Joseph	Platfòm Pitit Desalin	12,893	9.83		
Jean Willy Jean-Baptiste	Rally of Progressive National Democrats	8,513	6.49		
Patrice Israel	Fanmi Lavalas	5,854	4.46		
Carmelot F. M. Ch. Molaire	Renmen Ayiti	2,514	1.92		
Vikens Derilus	Struggling People's Organization	2,343	1.79		
Jonas Alexandre	Parti pour la Libération des Masses et l'Intégration Sociale	1,606	1.22		
Jean Charles Daniel	Konvansyon Inite Demokratik	1,528	1.17		
Mirtyl Edvard Gerard Dormevil	Rassemblement des Nationaux Démocrates Volontaires pour l’Unité Salvatrice	1,276	0.97		
Pollyx Paul	Fusion of Haitian Social Democrats	790	0.60		
Roseline Limage	Kombit Liberasyon Ekonomik	652	0.50		
Wesler Jean Baptiste	Parti Concorde Nationale	460	0.35		
Thomas Eddy Dupiton	Consortium National des Partis Politiques Haïtiens	247	0.19		
None of the above		2,002	1.53	5,033	3.08
Total		131,138	100.00	163,346	100.00
Valid votes		131,138	95.22	163,346	90.89
Invalid/blank votes		6,587	4.78	16,368	9.11
Total votes		137,725	100.00	179,714	100.00

Centre
Candidate	Party	First round		Second round	
Candidate	Party	Votes	%	Votes	%
Rony Célestin	Haitian Tèt Kale Party	25,630	31.73	52,710	49.59
Abel Descollines	Konvansyon Inite Demokratik	15,259	18.89	52,613	49.50
Bazelais Francois	Alternative League for Haitian Progress and Emancipation	9,914	12.27		
Joseph Joel Louis	Konbit Travaye Peyizan pou Libere Ayiti	7,391	9.15		
Romial Smith	Fanmi Lavalas	6,708	8.31		
Eddy John Marcadieu	Platfòm Pitit Desalin	6,112	7.57		
Francisco Delacruz	Struggling People's Organization	3,853	4.77		
Max Millien	Haiti in Action	3,416	4.23		
Serge Gilles	Fusion of Haitian Social Democrats	773	0.96		
Dieulin Saint Olympe	CANANN	452	0.56		
None of the above		1,261	1.56	968	0.91
Total		80,769	100.00	106,291	100.00
Valid votes		80,769	86.42	106,291	88.95
Invalid/blank votes		12,694	13.58	13,198	11.05
Total votes		93,463	100.00	119,489	100.00

Grand'Anse
Candidate	Party	First round		Second round	
Candidate	Party	Votes	%	Votes	%
Riche Andris	Struggling People's Organization	17,350	30.77	37,493	45.92
Jean Rigaud Bélizaire	Consortium National des Partis Politiques Haïtiens	16,045	28.46	43,128	52.83
Vincent Casseus	Alternative League for Haitian Progress and Emancipation	5,934	10.53		
Marie Roselore Aubourg	Konvansyon Inite Demokratik	3,590	6.37		
Jean Joubert Michel	Platfòm Pitit Desalin	2,420	4.29		
Frederic Cheron	Independent	2,419	4.29		
Guibert Barthelemy	Fanmi Lavalas	2,321	4.12		
Carl Antoine	Fusion of Haitian Social Democrats	2,213	3.93		
Michelet Jerome	Front Uni pour la Renaissance d'Haïti	968	1.72		
Jean Ronald Azor	Federalist Party	557	0.99		
Jean Patrick Saint Georges	Fwon Revolisyone pou Entegrasyon Mas Yo	535	0.95		
Janin Leonidas	Rally of Progressive National Democrats	526	0.93		
None of the above		1,501	2.66	1,020	1.25
Total		56,379	100.00	81,641	100.00
Valid votes		56,379	84.98	81,641	91.23
Invalid/blank votes		9,962	15.02	7,845	8.77
Total votes		66,341	100.00	89,486	100.00

Nippes
Candidate	Party	First round		Second round	
Candidate	Party	Votes	%	Votes	%
Denis Cadeau	Reseau National Bouclier	10,320	21.08	38,391	59.45
Louberson Vilson	Fanmi Lavalas	10,296	21.03	25,471	39.44
M. Carme Sineas Dumelfort	Haitian Tèt Kale Party	9,358	19.11		
Dieusseul Arice	Parti Concorde Nationale	8,991	18.36		
Lubern Pierre	Fusion of Haitian Social Democrats	6,532	13.34		
Michelet Casimir	Platfòm Pitit Desalin	2,157	4.41		
Nickel Pierre	Renmen Ayiti	747	1.53		
Vladimir Yayo	Ansanm Patriyot pou Lavni Ayiti	186	0.38		
None of the above		375	0.77	717	1.11
Total		48,962	100.00	64,579	100.00
Valid votes		48,962	91.44	64,579	88.08
Invalid/blank votes		4,585	8.56	8,738	11.92
Total votes		53,547	100.00	73,317	100.00

Nord
Candidate	Party	First round		Second round	
Candidate	Party	Votes	%	Votes	%
Jean Marie Ralph Féthière	Haitian Tèt Kale Party	47,997	35.68	77,217	56.34
Theodore Saintilus	Platfòm Pitit Desalin	18,891	14.04	56,899	41.52
Frandy Louis	Reseau National Bouclier	15,558	11.57		
Sergilus Docteur	Vérité	14,495	10.78		
Westner Polycarpe	Mouvement Revolisyone Ayisyen	6,867	5.10		
Hidson Nelson	Federalist Party	6,693	4.98		
Angelot Bell	Fanmi Lavalas	5,158	3.83		
John Jerome Jeanty	Renmen Ayiti	3,400	2.53		
Elvire Eugene	Fusion of Haitian Social Democrats	3,087	2.29		
Pelotat Pierre	Alternative League for Haitian Progress and Emancipation	2,972	2.21		
Jasmin Dorvil	Haiti in Action	2,185	1.62		
Cemephise Gilles	Ansanm Patriyot pou Lavni Ayiti	1,919	1.43		
Robens Marcellus	Rally of Progressive National Democrats	1,014	0.75		
Amos Zephirin	Consortium National des Partis Politiques Haïtiens	979	0.73		
Wilfrid Jean	Force Démocratique Haïtien Intégré	970	0.72		
Marc Andre Joseph	Kombit Liberasyon Ekonomik	671	0.50		
None of the above		1,668	1.24	2,929	2.14
Total		134,524	100.00	137,045	100.00
Valid votes		134,524	89.85	137,045	90.61
Invalid/blank votes		15,203	10.15	14,207	9.39
Total votes		149,727	100.00	151,252	100.00

Nord Est
Candidate	Party	Votes	%
Wanique Pierre	Haitian Tèt Kale Party	42,436	58.74
Jean-Baptistse Bien Aime	Fanmi Lavalas	18,530	25.65
Duchene Petit Frere	Platfòm Pitit Desalin	5,821	8.06
Enance Saint Fleur	Struggling People's Organization	2,135	2.96
Renan Etienne	Alternative League for Haitian Progress and Emancipation	1,987	2.75
Mona Eliacint Leandre	Rally of Progressive National Democrats	511	0.71
Gaston Saint Fleur	Fusion of Haitian Social Democrats	270	0.37
None of the above		558	0.77
Total		72,248	100.00
Valid votes		72,248	94.64
Invalid/blank votes		4,089	5.36
Total votes		76,337	100.00

Nord Ouest
Candidate	Party	First round		Second round	
Candidate	Party	Votes	%	Votes	%
Kedlaire Augustin	Haitian Tèt Kale Party	21,392	33.62	51,449	65.50
Francois Lucas Sainvil	Mouvement de Solidarite pour l'Avancement d'une Nouvelle Haïti	10,049	15.79	25,352	32.28
Elie Nicolas Plancher	Struggling People's Organization	8,945	14.06		
Jean Fritznel Bellefleur	Rally of Progressive National Democrats	7,168	11.26		
Jean-Gary Sanon	Fusion of Haitian Social Democrats	6,515	10.24		
Pierre Martin Tatoute	Vérité	3,193	5.02		
Dominique Philor	Independent	2,250	3.54		
Eddy Bastien	Reseau National Bouclier	1,841	2.89		
Amos Pierre	Fanmi Lavalas	1,563	2.46		
None of the above		716	1.13	1,748	2.23
Total		63,632	100.00	78,549	100.00
Valid votes		63,632	94.34	78,549	93.01
Invalid/blank votes		3,819	5.66	5,907	6.99
Total votes		67,451	100.00	84,456	100.00

Ouest
Candidate	Party	First round		Second round	
Candidate	Party	Votes	%	Votes	%
Fednel Monchery	Haitian Tèt Kale Party	78,172	21.74	104,825	40.13
Pierre Paul Patrice Dumont	Rassemblement des Patriotes Haïtiens	67,194	18.68	149,918	57.40
Louis Gerald Gilles	Fanmi Lavalas	40,596	11.29		
Alix Didier Fils-Aime	Vérité	40,232	11.19		
Jean Myrtho Muraille	Platfòm Pitit Desalin	31,406	8.73		
Arnel Belizaire	Ansanm Patriyot pou Lavni Ayiti	26,095	7.26		
Jean Adler Gaston	Parti Concorde Nationale	16,917	4.70		
Michel Andre	Rally of Progressive National Democrats	14,260	3.97		
Marie Liliane Vedrigue Hersche	Mouvement Revolisyone Ayisyen	9,521	2.65		
Sabine Duvivier Morpeau	CANANN	4,809	1.34		
Volcy Assad	Entente Nationale des Travailleurs pour le Reveil d'Haïti	4,318	1.20		
John Miller Beauvoir	Fusion of Haitian Social Democrats	4,080	1.13		
Lucmanne Delille	Struggling People's Organization	3,639	1.01		
Tranquilor Mathieu	Inite Patriyotik	3,533	0.98		
Jean Eugene Pierre-Louis	Konbit pou Rekonstwi Haïti	2,450	0.68		
Fredely Georges	Front Uni pour la Renaissance d'Haïti	1,412	0.39		
Louis Gonzague Edner Day	Kombit Liberasyon Ekonomik	1,345	0.37		
Jean Nelson Pierre	Rassemblement des Nationaux Démocrates Volontaires pour l’Unité Salvatrice	1,281	0.36		
Amelus Gregoire	Federalist Party	1,107	0.31		
Jean Luckner Pierre	Independent	325	0.09		
None of the above		6,954	1.93	6,452	2.47
Total		359,646	100.00	261,195	100.00
Valid votes		359,646	93.44	261,195	87.54
Invalid/blank votes		25,241	6.56	37,161	12.46
Total votes		384,887	100.00	298,356	100.00

Sud
Candidate	Party	First round		Second round	
Candidate	Party	Votes	%	Votes	%
Pierre François Sildor	Haitian Tèt Kale Party	21,683	25.51	72,919	57.77
Fritz Carlos Lebon	Fanmi Lavalas	21,532	25.33	51,325	40.66
Pierre Franky Exius	Alternative League for Haitian Progress and Emancipation	17,591	20.69		
Yvon Buissereth	Vérité	6,970	8.20		
Gandhy Dorfeuille	Ansanm Patriyot pou Lavni Ayiti	4,420	5.20		
Anthony Gedeon	Struggling People's Organization	4,220	4.96		
Kenol Mathieu	Platfòm Pitit Desalin	4,060	4.78		
Wilfrid Leader's Vital	Fusion of Haitian Social Democrats	2,699	3.17		
Kesnerd Edouard	Kombit Liberasyon Ekonomik	774	0.91		
None of the above		1,059	1.25	1,976	1.57
Total		85,008	100.00	126,220	100.00
Valid votes		85,008	91.15	126,220	88.90
Invalid/blank votes		8,252	8.85	15,766	11.10
Total votes		93,260	100.00	141,986	100.00

Sud Est
Candidate	Party	Votes	%
Joseph Lambert	Konbit Pou Ayiti	44,131	53.78
Hebert Lahatte	Konvansyon Inite Demokratik	15,922	19.40
Jacques Roderich Ladouceur	Platfòm Pitit Desalin	10,331	12.59
Miralda Jameau	Fanmi Lavalas	2,820	3.44
Marie Sylvia Fabien Moise	MOPANOU	2,279	2.78
Joissaint Ephesien	Vérité	2,146	2.62
Jean Renel Denis	Kombit Liberasyon Ekonomik	1,406	1.71
Milot Fenelon Cajou	Fusion of Haitian Social Democrats	1,361	1.66
Willy Senatus	Parti Concorde Nationale	1,001	1.22
None of the above		662	0.81
Total		82,059	100.00
Valid votes		82,059	89.50
Invalid/blank votes		9,628	10.50
Total votes		91,687	100.00
