= Alternative League for Haitian Progress and Emancipation =

Alternative League for Haitian Progress and Emancipation Ligue Alternative pour le Progrès et L'Émancipation Haïtienne
- Abbreviation: LAPEH
- Leader: Jude Célestin
- Founded: 2011
- Split from: INITE
- Headquarters: Port-au-Prince
- Political position: Centre-left
- Colours: Green; Yellow
- Chamber of Deputies: 0 / 119
- Senate: 0 / 30

Alternative League for Haitian Progress and Emancipation (French: Ligue Alternative pour le Progrès et L'Émancipation Haïtienne, LAPEH) is a Haitian political party. The party is led by Jude Célestin, and held three seats in the Chamber of Deputies after the 2015 election, while holding no seats in the Senate, although both houses of Haitian parliament have been vacant since January 10, 2023. The party abbreviation, LAPEH, is pronounced like the Haitian Creole word "lapé", meaning "peace", from French "la paix".

LAPEH was founded as an offshoot of the INITE party in 2011, after Célestin, who had been selected by René Préval to run as the INITE party candidate in the 2010 presidential elections, was forced to withdraw due to allegations of electoral fraud by the United States and OAS. At the time the allegations were made, Célestin had come in second place in the first round of elections, behind Mirlande Manigat and before Michel Martelly. After Célestin was forced to withdraw, Martelly qualified for the runoff election against Manigat instead, and eventually won the presidency. In a paper for the Center for Economic and Policy Research, economist David Rosnick claimed that the allegations against Célestin did not have a statistically valid basis and that the forced withdrawal amounted to election engineering.

== 2015–16 Presidential Election ==
In the 2015 presidential election, Célestin was again the LAPEH candidate, and in the first round came second with 25% of the vote, behind PHTK candidate Jovenel Moïse's 33%, qualifying for a runoff. The election immediately was the target of widespread allegations of fraud and corruption by various opposition party leaders and candidates, including Célestin, who refused to participate in the 2016 runoff election. Célestin alleged that president Michel Martelly was influencing the Conseil Électoral Provisoire (CEP), Haiti's election authority, in favor of his chosen candidate, Jovenel Moïse. New elections were held in 2016, which Moïse won in the first round with 55.6% of the vote, while Célestin came second with 19.5%.

== Ideology ==
LAPEH is one of Haiti's most influential parties of the center-left, connected with the INITE party of Préval, which itself is an offshoot of the more moderate wing of the Lavalas movement of former president Jean-Bertrand Aristide.

== Electoral performance ==
=== Presidential ===
Election	Candidate	First round				Second round			
Election	Candidate	Votes	%	Position	Result	Votes	%	Position	Result
2015	Jude Célestin	392,782	25.29%	2nd	Lost	Election results annulled			
2016	Jude Célestin	207,988	19.57%	2nd	Lost				
2026	Fritz Jean (Note: As candidate of the INITE–LAPEH alliance.)	TBD	TBD	TBD	TBD				

=== Parliamentary ===
==== Senate ====
Election	Leader	Votes	%	Seats	+/–	Position	Government
2015–16	Jude Célestin	Unknown	Unknown	0 / 30	New	14th	Opposition
2016–17	Jude Célestin	Unknown	Unknown	0 / 10	Steady	▼6th	Opposition

==== Chamber of Deputies ====
Election	Leader	Votes	%	Seats	+/–	Position	Government
2015–16	Jude Célestin	Unknown	Unknown	4 / 119	New	13th	Opposition
