= Inite =

- Abbreviation: INITE
- President: Sorel Jacinthe
- Secretary-General: Marie Denise Claude
- Founder: René Préval
- Founded: 28 November 2009; 16 years ago
- Preceded by: Lespwa
- Headquarters: Port-au-Prince
- Political position: Centre-left
- Colours: Green; Yellow
- Chamber of Deputies: 0 / 119
- Senate: 0 / 30

Patriotic Unity (Haitian Creole: Inite Patriyotik, INITE) is a political party in Haiti founded on 28 November 2009. Its founder and leader was René Préval, who served as President of Haiti from 2006 to 2011.

In April 2019, some of the party's founding and senior members announced that Inite had been dissolved. The announcement was disputed by members of the party's National Coordination Committee, who maintained that the organization continued to exist. A group led by Paul Denis subsequently formed the separate political party Inifos, while Inite continued to participate in Haitian political activity after the dispute.

As of 2026, Inite is listed by the Provisional Electoral Council (CEP) as an approved political party under the name Parti INITE, assigning it the number 84.

== History ==
Inite emerged from the political movement associated with René Préval, who had previously organized the Lespwa platform during his successful 2006 presidential campaign, itself a former faction of Fanmi Lavalas. In November 2009, Lespwa was reorganized into the new Inite party. The new organization incorporated political groups and factions associated with several Haitian parties, including the Christian National Union for the Reconstruction of Haiti (Union Nationale Chrétienne pour la Reconstruction d'Haïti), the Movement for National Reconstruction (Mouvement pour la Reconstruction Nationale), the Country Organization Movement (Mouvement d'Organisation du Pays), and the Open the Gate Party (Parti Louvri Barye).

Préval remained the party's principal political figure during its first years. In the 2010–11 general election, Inite nominated Jude Célestin as its presidential candidate. Célestin initially qualified for the runoff according to the preliminary results, but the Provisional Electoral Council subsequently revised the results following allegations of electoral irregularities, placing him behind Michel Martelly and removing him from the runoff. Inite also performed strongly in the parliamentary elections, winning 46 seats in the Chamber of Deputies and 6 in the Senate after both rounds.

In 2015, the party was renamed Patriotic Unity (Inite Patriyotik) following a merger with two other political groups. The change occurred during a broader reorganization of the political forces associated with Préval. Préval and supporters subsequently established the Vérité political platform, which competed separately from Inite Patriyotik in the 2015–16 parliamentary election, presenting 8 candidates for the Senate and 39 for the Chamber of Deputies.

In April 2019, reports stated that founding members of Inite had decided to dissolve the party. The reported decision was dated 12 April, and reports of the dissolution appeared later that month. The dissolution was disputed by members of the party's National Coordination Committee.

Sorel Jacinthe, a spokesperson for the committee, stated on 14 May 2019 that Inite had not been dissolved and argued that the party's founding members could not unilaterally terminate the organization without following the procedures established by its internal rules. Jacinthe blamed Paul Denis of spreading rumours about its dissolution to strengthen the new party he was creating, which he denied. Four days earlier, Denis and several other dissident members of Inite had announced the launching of the Inifos party.

On 16 May, Justice Minister Jean Roudy Aly responded to the committee's protests against the announced dissolution, saying he took note of them and the situation remained unchanged.

In 2020, Inite joined eight other opposition parties in political efforts directed against the government of President Jovenel Moïse. Following Moïse's assassination in July 2021, Inite was one of the political parties that signed an agreement on 9 July 2021 declaring Joseph Lambert as the interim President. It and other political parties signed an agreement with Prime Minister Ariel Henry on 11 September, for a peaceful and consensual administration of the country before the swearing-in of an elected government.

== Electoral performance ==
=== Presidential ===
Election	Candidate	First round				Second round			
Election	Candidate	Votes	%	Position	Result	Votes	%	Position	Result
2010–11	Jude Célestin	241,462	22.48%	2nd	Lost	Did not participate			
2015	No presidential candidate				Lost				
2016	No presidential candidate				Lost				
2026	Fritz Jean (Note: As candidate of the INITE–LAPEH alliance.)	TBD	TBD	TBD	TBD				

=== Parliamentary ===
==== Senate ====
Election	Leader	Votes	%	Seats	+/–	Position	Government
2010–11	Jean-Max Bellerive	Unknown	Unknown	6 / 11	New	1st	Government
2015–16	Jude Célestin	Unknown	Unknown	1 / 30	▼5	▼11th	Opposition
2016–17	Jude Célestin	Unknown	Unknown	0 / 30			Opposition

==== Chamber of Deputies ====
Election	Leader	Votes	%	Seats	+/–	Position	Government
2010–11	Jean-Max Bellerive	Unknown	Unknown	46 / 99	New	1st	Government
2015–16	Jude Célestin	Unknown	Unknown	5 / 119	▼41	▼8th	Opposition
