= Elections in Haiti =

The Constitution of Haiti provides for the election of the President, Parliament, and members of local governing bodies. The 2015–16 Haitian parliamentary election were held but faced accusations of irregularity. The 2016 indirect presidential election was held following annulment of the 2015 election. Jovenel Moïse was elected in a re-run of the election, but was assassinated in 2021. The Transitional Presidential Council has exercised the powers of the presidency since the resignation of Ariel Henry, who as prime minister had exercised executive duties following Moïse's death. The TPC's mandate is set to conclude on 7 February 2026.

== History ==
=== 2010–2011 elections ===
The 2010 presidential election took place on 28 November 2010, with a run-off election taking place on 20 March 2011.

No candidate received a majority of the vote cast in the first-round election. A second round was scheduled for 20 March 2011 with the two highest vote-getters, Mirlande Manigat and Jude Célestin. Protests claiming fraudulent voting resulted in the electoral commission removing Célestin from the race. This promoted Martelly from his original third-place finish in the first-round, to face Manigat in the run-off.

=== 2010 and 2015 ===
In January 2015, after a series of disputed, unconstitutional, electoral commissions named by President Martelly were rejected by the Parliament, a Provisional Electoral Council was created to plan the presidential and parliamentary elections later in 2015.
