= Jocelerme Privert =

Haitian accountant and politician (born 1953)

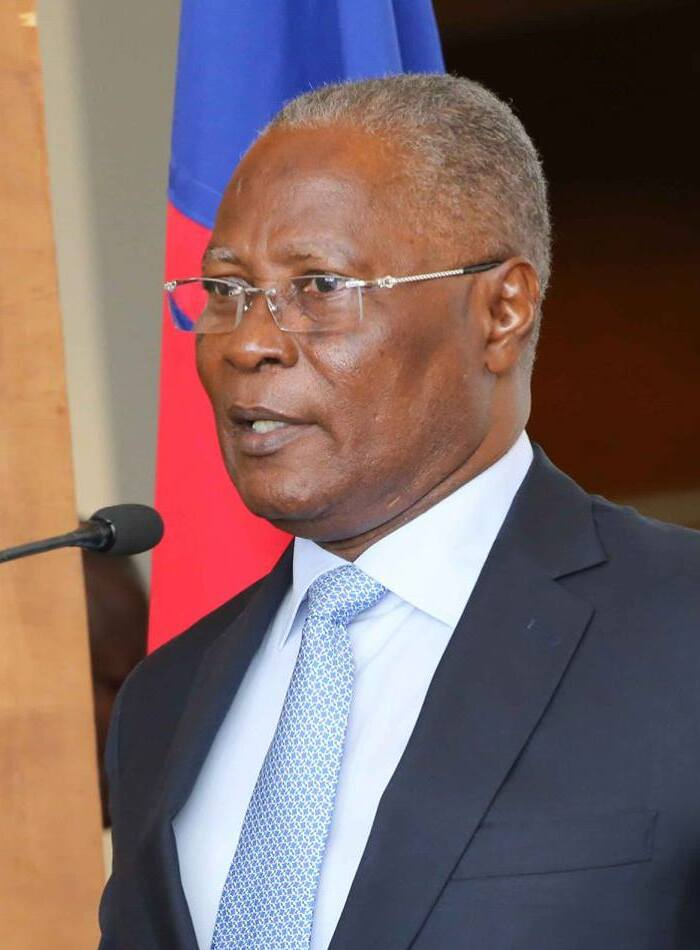
- Privert in 2017

Interim President of Haiti
- In office 14 February 2016 – 7 February 2017
- Prime Minister: Evans Paul; Fritz Jean; Enex Jean-Charles
- Preceded by: Evans Paul (acting)
- Succeeded by: Jovenel Moïse

President of the Haitian Senate
- In office 14 January 2016 – 14 February 2016
- Preceded by: Andris Riché
- Succeeded by: Ronald Larêche
Additional positions
Haitian Senator
In office 26 April 2011 – 14 January 2016
Constituency	Nippes
Minister of Interior and Territorial Communities
In office 15 March 2002 – 12 March 2004
Prime Minister	Yvon Neptune
Preceded by	Henri-Claude Ménard
Succeeded by	Hérard Abraham
Secretary of State for Finance
In office 2 March 2001 – 15 March 2002
Prime Minister	Jean Marie Chérestal

Personal details
- Born: 1 February 1953 (age 73) Petit-Trou-de-Nippes, Haiti
- Party: Inifos (since 2019)
- Other political affiliations: Inite (2009–2019); Lespwa (2006–2009)
- Spouse: Ginette Michaud Privert (m. 1988)
- Children: Nandie; Fadha; Nadia

Jocelerme Privert (French pronunciation: [ʒɔslɛʁm pʁivɛʁ]; born 1 February 1953) is a Haitian accountant and bureaucrat who served as the interim president of Haiti from 2016 to 2017. He previously served as a senator from 2011 to 2016 and as Minister of Interior and Territorial Communities from 2002 to 2004.

Privert is a candidate in the 2026 presidential election under the Ayiti Transfòme (Transform Haiti) coalition.

== Political career ==
=== Early political career ===
A longtime politician, he first served as the economics and finance minister under Jean-Bertrand Aristide during 2001 and 2002. Aristide reappointed him Minister of Interior and Territorial Communities in 2002 and he served until the 2004 Haitian coup d'état that removed Aristide from the presidency.

=== Accusation of massacre and incarceration ===
Privert was accused of involvement in the La Scierie massacre in Saint-Marc and arrested on 4 April 2004. According to Haitian organizations defending human rights, dozens of people were killed in February 2004 in the town of Saint-Marc, an opposition stronghold at that time. Jocelerme Privert was released after 26 months in prison.

=== Later political career ===
After his release from prison, he served as an advisor to then-president René Préval. He subsequently ran for a senate seat in a 2008 by-election in Nippes department, but was not elected. He was later elected Senator for Nippes department in the 2010 general elections, serving from 26 April 2011 to 14 January 2016 and was elected by the Senate to serve as its president. He was also the President of the Senate Committee on Economy and Finance.

== Provisional presidency (2016-2017) ==
Privert was elected by the Senate as the provisional president of Haiti on 14 February 2016, pending a general election after no more than 120 days. A general run-off election date later agreed between Jovenel Moïse and Jude Célestin was originally scheduled to be held on 24 April 2016, but the Conseil Electoral Provisoire decided on 5 April 2016 to hold a new election in early October 2016.

On 14 June 2016, his presidential term expired, but he remained de facto president as the National Assembly refused to meet to appoint a successor. On February 7, 2017, he was succeeded by Jovenel Moïse of the Michel Martelly-founded Haitian Tèt Kale Party (PHTK) who won the November 2016 election.

== Personal life ==
Privert met his wife, Ginette Michaud, a physician and radiologist, in 1986. The couple married in 1988 and had three daughters: Deborah, Sarah, and Vicky.

Privert is an accountant. He served in the General Tax Directorate (a governmental agency) from 1979 until the directorate was removed in 1999.

Political offices
Preceded by Michel Martelly	President of Haiti; Interim; 2016–2017	Succeeded by Jovenel Moïse
