= 2015–16 Haitian presidential election =

Haitian presidential election, 2015–16 may refer to:

- 2015 Haitian presidential election
- February 2016 Haitian presidential election
- November 2016 Haitian presidential election
