= 2021–25 Haitian constitutional referendum attempt =

Constitutional referendum held in Haiti

A constitutional referendum was planned to be held in Haiti in May 2025, but the Electoral Council has been unable to announce a date — raising doubts whether it will be held. It is the first referendum in the country since 1987, and was unilaterally proposed by the administration of Jovenel Moïse. Originally set to be held on 27 June 2021, the referendum was postponed to 26 September 2021, on the same day as the presidential and parliamentary elections. The referendum was again postponed to 7 November. Acting Prime Minister Ariel Henry later postponed it first to February 2022 and then 2023.

== Background ==
In the absence of a Constitutional Council, a Permanent Electoral Council, and a functioning Senate there was ambiguity as to the end of President Jovenel Moïse's term of office. While he believed that his term would end on 7 February 2022, having been elected in the elections of November 2016 and taking office on 7 February 2017 for a presidential mandate of 5 years, the opposition and civil society groups — including Haiti's Conseil Supérieur du Pouvoir Judiciaire (CSPJ) and Federation of Haitian Bar associations — said the term ended on 7 February 2021. On that day, the Supreme Council of the Judiciary declared the end of the President's term, while the government announced that it had foiled an attempted coup. The next day, the opposition announced that it would appoint Judge Joseph Mécène Jean-Louis as interim president for a two-year transition period, alongside the drafting of a new constitution during a period of a national conference.

== Proposed changes ==
The referendum would bring a number of proposed changes to the constitution of Haiti, including:

- Abolition of the Senate and creation of a unicameral legislature
- Abolition of the post of Prime Minister (thereby changing from a semi-presidential system to a full presidential system of government)
  - Creation of an office of Vice President to replace the Prime Minister
- Modification of the electoral system for presidential elections, changing from a two-round system to one held in one round under first-past-the-post voting
- Moving regular legislative elections to coincide with presidential elections every five years
- Modification of the presidential term limit, allowing two consecutive five-year terms (removing the requirement for a five-year interval before being eligible to serve again for a final term). Additionally, the incumbent will be prohibited from running in the next presidential election following the adoption of the new constitution
- Allowing Haitian citizens with dual nationality to run for, or serve in, high office, including president (local and deputy elections included, provided habitual residence is proven), as well as allocating Haitians abroad no less than 5% of legislative seats
- Mandatory military and/or civic service for those turning 18 years of age
- Constitutional amendments need approval in the legislature and then in a referendum, rather than in two votes in the legislature before and after general elections

== Postponement ==
On 7 June 2021 the government announced that it would be postponing the referendum, stating the COVID-19 pandemic in Haiti and difficulties the electoral council faced in recruiting and training electoral staff as reasons. The government announced the new date of 26 September 2021 for the referendum.

After the assassination of Jovenel Moïse and a major earthquake, the Provisional Electoral Council delayed the referendum to 7 November 2021. The acting Prime Minister Ariel Henry however later dissolved the electoral council and stated on 29 September that he planned to hold the referendum next February. In June 2022, Henry announced the holding of elections "as soon as possible" once the security situation had been restored. On 21 December 2022, he announced the signing of a new political agreement that provided for the holding of new elections and the referendum in 2023 and the investiture of the new president on 7 February 2024, among others.

The project was cancelled on 9 October 2025, and then relaunched in February 2026.
