= Dithny Joan Raton =

Haitian politician (born 1974)

Haitian Minister for Culture
- In office January 2015 – September 2017
- President: Michel Martelly (2015–2016); Jocelerme Privert (2016–2017)
- Succeeded by: Limond Toussaint

Dithny Joan Raton (born 10 September 1974) is a Haitian politician who was the country's Minister for Culture in Haiti's Cabinet between 2015 and 2017.

== Personal life ==
Raton studied at the Alcibiades Pommayrac in Jacmel. Her ambition was once to be a professional dancer.

== Career ==
Raton has worked as an administrator. In 2015, Raton became Haiti's Minister for Culture. As Minister, Raton has tried to increase the use of Haitian Creole; the country dedicates October to the language. In August 2015, Raton and Barbados' Minister of Culture, Stephen Lashley met to create a cultural agreement. In 2017, Limond Toussaint became Minister of Culture in Jovenel Moïse's government.
