= Assassination of Jovenel Moïse =

2021 murder in Port-au-Prince, Haiti

- Part of the Haitian crisis (2018–present)
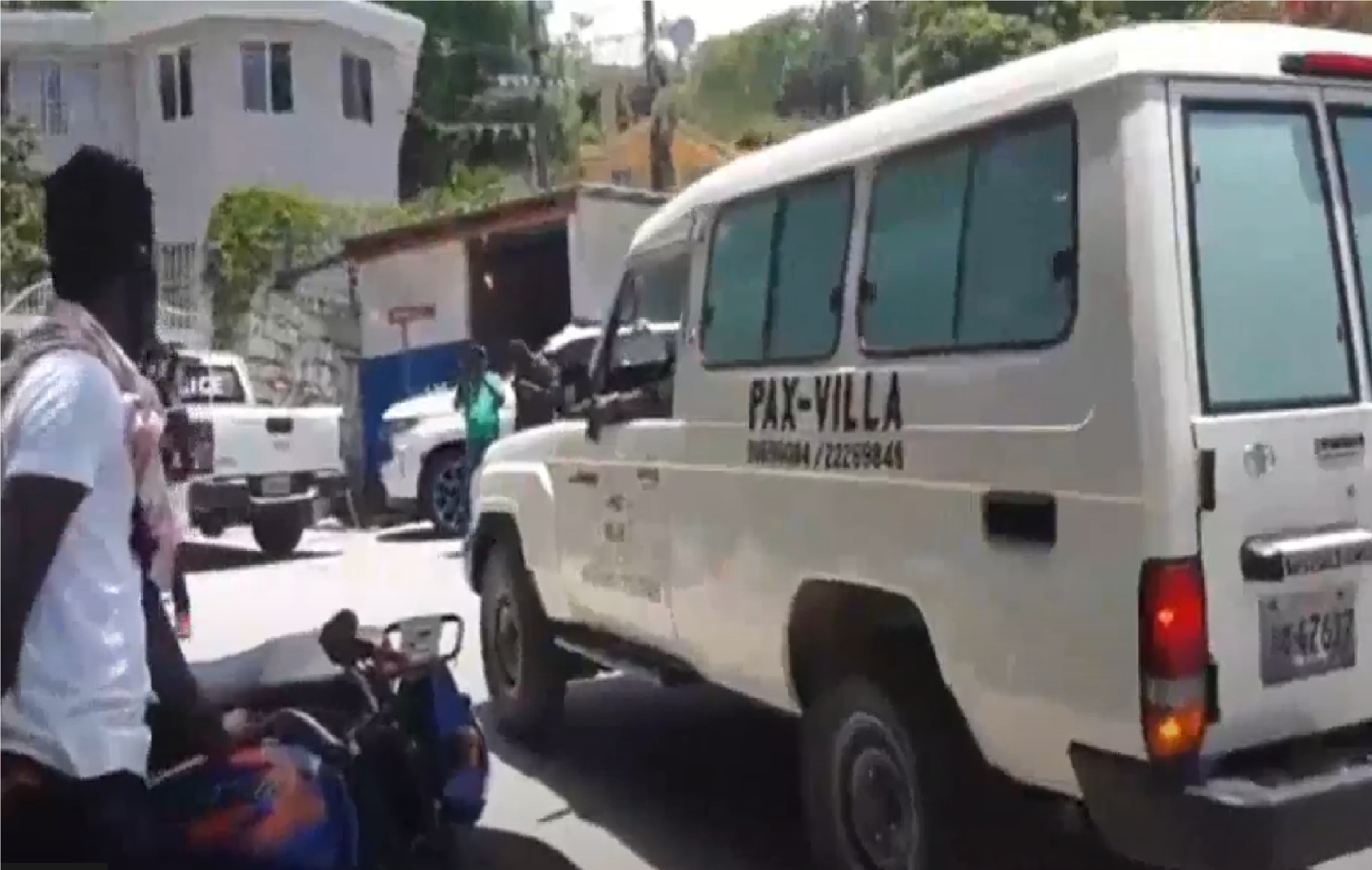
- The van carrying Moïse's body
- Location: 18°29′55″N 72°17′51″W; Pèlerin 5, Pétion-Ville, Haiti
- Date: 7 July 2021; 1:00 am (EDT (UTC−04:00))
- Target: Jovenel Moïse
- Attack type: Assassination
- Deaths: Jovenel Moïse
- Injuries: Martine Moïse
- Perpetrator: Unknown
- Assailants: 28
- Motive: Under investigation

Jovenel Moïse, the 48th president of Haiti, was assassinated on 7 July 2021 at 1:00 am EDT (UTC−04:00) at his residence in Port-au-Prince. A group of 28 foreign mercenaries, mostly from Colombia, are alleged to be responsible for the killing. First Lady Martine Moïse was also shot multiple times in the attack and was airlifted to the United States for emergency treatment. Later in the day, USGPN (L'Unité de Sécurité Générale du Palais National, or The General Security Unit of the National Palace, headed by Dimitri Herard) killed three of the suspected assassins and arrested 20 more. A manhunt was launched for other gunmen as well as the masterminds of the attack.

Haitian chief prosecutor Bedford Claude questioned Moïse's top bodyguards; none of the president's security guards were killed or injured in the attack. U.S. authorities arrested 11 suspects alleged to have conspired in the assassination. Martine Moïse and former acting prime minister Claude Joseph were formally charged on 19 February 2024 with conspiring in the assassination.

== Background ==
=== Election ===
Jovenel Moïse was the chosen successor to President Michel Martelly, who was constitutionally barred from seeking reelection in the 2015 presidential election (Martelly was ineligible to run again as Haiti's constitution does not allow for consecutive terms.) According to official results, Moïse received 33% of ballots cast in the first round, more than any other candidate but short of the majority required to avoid a run-off election. These results were disputed by second-place finisher Jude Célestin and others, whose supporters protested. The mandated runoff was repeatedly delayed, prompting further protest, some leading to violent unrest. The 2015 election results were eventually annulled. When Martelly's term expired, the legislature appointed Jocelerme Privert as interim president before fresh elections in November 2016. In these elections, Moïse received 56% of the official tally, enough to avoid a runoff. Moïse assumed office on 7 February 2017.

=== Political turmoil ===
During Moïse's time in office, political unrest and violence were common, including violent anti-government protests. The span of Moïse's term in office was disputed, sparking a constitutional crisis. Presidential terms in Haiti are five years, and Moïse claimed a mandate to govern until February 2022, five years after his taking office. However, opposition figures claimed Moïse's mandate ended in February 2021, five years after the victor of the 2015 presidential election would have been sworn in under normal circumstances. Widespread protests demanded Moïse's resignation, and the opposition named Judge Joseph Mécène Jean-Louis as a proposed interim president in February 2021. Moïse received support from the United States government and the Organization of American States (OAS) to remain in office until 2022. Scheduled legislative elections in October 2019, as well as a referendum for a new constitution, were delayed until September 2021, which resulted in Moïse ruling by decree.

Moïse said he foiled a coup attempt to kill him and overthrow the government in February 2021; at least 23 people were arrested. Moïse appointed seven different prime ministers during his time in office, the last of whom was Ariel Henry, who was appointed on 5 July 2021, but had not been sworn in by the time of the attack.

The New York Times revealed that before his death, Moïse had been working to expose the corrupt politicians and businesspeople who were involved in the illegal drug trade, by passing on information to the United States. The most significant among these people was Charles Saint-Rémy, a businessman and brother-in-law of Martelly. Moïse had also been seeking to end the state capture by affluent individuals, including Martelly's family. After the apparent coup attempt was prevented in 2021 by Dimitri Hérard, the head of the presidential guard, Moïse accused Haiti's elite of being behind it and privately started planning to have them exposed.

=== Planning ===
According to the head of the National Police of Colombia, General Jorge Luis Vargas Valencia, the Colombian attackers were recruited by four companies. He stated that monetary motivation seemed to be the only reason behind the attackers agreeing to do the job. The Florida-based company Worldwide Investment Development Group was identified as the company that raised money for the assassination. In May 2021, its owner, Walter Veintemilla, met with Christian Emmanuel Sanon, a 63-year-old Haitian American, self-described pastor and physician, who apparently saw himself as a potential future leader for the country, to discuss the likelihood of political upheaval in Haiti. Veintemilla agreed to extend loans to Sanon, purportedly for his security during the envisioned upheavel. A large portion of the funds went to a Miami-based security company called CTU Security for the hiring of Colombian mercenaries. President of Colombia Iván Duque Márquez said that most of the Colombians went to Haiti under the impression that they were to work as bodyguards, but a few others were aware of the actual plan.

Parnell Duverger, a retired adjunct professor who taught economics at Broward College, stated that he attended around 10 meetings with the accused to plan Haiti's future after Moïse's resignation. These meetings were conducted in Florida and the Dominican Republic months before the assassination. At no point, according to Duverger, was a coup or murder planned. It was assumed that Sanon was eventually going to become the prime minister of Haiti. Another participant, Frantz Gilot, who is a consultant for the United Nations, also denied that there was a plan to kill the president. According to American court filings related to the assassination, former Drug Enforcement Administration informant and Haitian-American Joseph Vincent, who had traveled to Haiti in 2021 to support Sanon, pretended to be an employee of the United States Department of State during meetings and provided material support and services to the plan. He stated that he and another Haitian-American, James Solages, had been hired as interpreters by the co-conspirators of the plot.

According to an investigation carried out by The Wall Street Journal, CTU hired a Colombian veteran named Duberney Capador to recruit other former soldiers, which he accomplished through WhatsApp, promising them a monthly salary of $3,000 to protect Haiti's elite politicians. Capador claimed that CTU had the support of the U.S State Department, while they would take part in urban combat and live in "threadbare accommodations". However, there was no mention of a plan to kill or overthrow Moïse. Per the American investigation, former Colombian army officer Germán Alejandro Rivera Garcia who led the Colombian mercenaries began meeting with the co-conspirators in February 2021 for the planning of the operation and one of the persons at the meetings was Arcangel Pretel Ortiz, a former Colombian-American informant for the Federal Bureau of Investigation and an employee of CTU who assisted in hiring some of the Colombian mercenaries and told Rivera to follow the directions of another conspirator.

CTU used its company credit card to buy 19 plane tickets for the suspected assailants, for flights from Bogotá to Santo Domingo. According to Valencia, two of the Colombian suspects flew to Santo Domingo from Bogotá via Panama on 6 May 2021. They arrived in Port-au-Prince on 10 May by taking another flight. A further 11 Colombian suspects took a flight to the resort town of Punta Cana from Bogotá on 4 June. They crossed into Haiti on 7 June through the Carrizal border crossing.

The mercenaries were later told they would be guarding Moïse. On 22 June the men met with Antonio Intriago, the owner of CTU, and were told that they would help lift Haiti out of poverty by increasing security in the country, which would attract investors. A judge who interviewed the two Haitian-American suspects, one of whom said he had been in Haiti for one month prior to the attack and the other of whom said he had been in Haiti for six months, said that the plot had been planned intensively for a month at a high-end hotel in Pétion-Ville.

Haitian National Police Chief Léon Charles said that Sanon had arrived in Haiti in June via a plane and had contacted two other people behind the plot. The attackers were initially contracted to guard him but later were tasked with executing an arrest warrant against Moïse, so that he could be legally replaced as president. Charles added that he had recruited some of the attackers through CTU Security, and 22 more were recruited later. Per the American prosecutors, Wendelle Coq Thélot, a former judge of the Supreme Court of Haiti, had gained the backing of the conspirators in Florida to become the president of Haiti in place of Sanon and apparently signed a document requesting arrest of Moïse, which was delivered by Solages to Intragio on 28 June.

According to Charles, one of the suspects, Joseph-Félix Badio, who is a former employee of the Haitian government, assisted the attackers by renting a home to them near Moïse's home. Reynaldo Corvington, owner of the Haitian security company "Corvington Courier & Security Service", provided them with lodging and sirens for their cars with the help of one of the assailants. Former Haitian Senator John Joël Joseph was also identified by Charles as a mastermind of the plot, furnishing the attackers with weapons and organizing meetings.

According to the complaint filed by the United States Department of Justice, the suspects had been training in Haiti for several weeks, according to interviews with them and images from electronic devices. The suspects also stated that they originally only planned to kidnap Moïse two weeks before the assassination when he returned from Turkey, but were forced to call it off as they did not receive the signal to carry it out. They also planned to have Fantom 509, a gang consisting of disgruntled former police officers, kidnap Moïse but later decided against it. One of the arrested suspects stated that they planned to capture him at the Toussaint Louverture International Airport and flee Haiti with him, but they had to cancel the operation as they were unable to charter a private plane. He was however told on 6 July that the plan had changed, and they were to kill Moïse instead.

Per leaked audio confessions obtained by Noticias Caracol, the suspected assailants admitted their involvement to the Haitian police: that shortly before the operation, they had been ordered by one of the masterminds to kill Moïse and everyone in his home and had also been told to loot the money stashed there. They were told to flee to the Presidential Palace, where the new president of Haiti would be sworn in, and they thought the police would protect them. According to information retrieved by The New York Times, some of the suspects stated that retrieving Moïse's list which contained names of the corrupt elite involved in the drug trade was a main objective of theirs.

Haitian businessman Rodolphe Jaar in an interview with The New York Times admitted to planning and financing the plot but stated that he believed that the goal was to only remove Moïse from power. Jaar stated that he became involved because he thought that Moïse was authoritarian, and he agreed to join after being told that it was being supported by the United States which wanted Moïse gone due to his links with terrorists and drug traffickers. He added that he provided $130,000 for the plot, procured guns, and provided a safehouse for the Colombians. Jaar stated that he had discussed with a leader of Fantom 509 about assaulting Moïse's residence, but the gang refused to participate about a week before the assassination, and the Colombians were then told that their mission had changed to storming Moïse's residence.

Per the FBI affidavit, Jaar met a co-conspirator before the assassination and planned along with others to have Moïse arrested upon his return from Turkey in mid-June per witness statements. After that plot failed, the other conspirator traveled from Haiti to Miami on June 28 to request assistance in targeting Moïse. The Miami Herald stated that he informed CTU about it. The affidavit adds that by this point, some conspirators were aware that the actual objective was to kill Moïse. According to the investigation, Rivera and Solages were told that the objective had changed to killing Moïse two weeks before the assassination, which they then passed on to Vincent and Palacios. A day before the assassination, Vincent falsely told the Colombian mercenaries that they were to kill Moïse as part of an operation of the Central Intelligence Agency.

== Attack ==
Former Prime Minister Laurent Lamothe said there are often 100 officers from the presidential guard around the president's home. Neighbors and acquaintances have stated however, that Moïse only had a few guards around his home on most days. According to a Haitian National Police investigation report, only six were guarding the residence at the time of the assassination. According to the report, two of the guards had acted as informants, and the rest showed no resistance at all.

On 7 July 2021, at around 1 am local time, a group of gunmen stormed Moïse's home in Pèlerin 5, a district of the upmarket Pétion-Ville quarter of Port-au-Prince. Seven of the assailants were involved in killing the president and four (called the "Delta team") personally entered his bedroom, but the rest stayed outside according to General Jorge Luis Vargas Valencia, chief of the National Police of Colombia. All of the team leaders were carrying Samsung Galaxy phones to take images of his corpse to send as confirmation to the orchestrators of the assassination.

Moïse called several police officials for help after discovering the attackers, but none of them arrived in time. The assailants started shooting in his office and bedroom and then ransacked the two rooms and left. Moïse was severely beaten before he was shot multiple times, killing him at the scene. He was left with twelve bullets in his chest, arms, right leg, and left hip, and had a shattered left eye. The house was riddled with 9mm and 5.56mm bullets.

First Lady Martine Moïse was also attacked, suffering gunshot wounds in her arms and thighs, in addition to severe injuries to her hands and abdomen. Martine stated that the attackers ransacked her room, searching her files, before attacking her, and left after thinking she was dead. Some of the suspects later admitted that the document they had stolen was the list containing names of corrupt individuals involved in drug trafficking. According to the Haitian police, the suspects also robbed the money stored in Moïse's home. The couple's daughter was in the house during the attack. She hid in the bathroom of her younger brother's bedroom and escaped unharmed, while two maids and a guard were tied up by the attackers but were not shot.

A video taken by residents living near the site of the attack contains the voice of one man, speaking in English, who claimed over a megaphone during the attack to be a member of the U.S. Drug Enforcement Administration; however, the assailants did not belong to the agency. Interim Prime Minister Claude Joseph said later that the attackers carried military rifles and spoke both English and Spanish. According to those who filmed the attack, the assailants disarmed Moïse's security. Neighbors of Moïse said they heard heavy machine gun fire shortly after the attack. Residents reported hearing weapon fire, and "seeing men dressed like commandos in black running through the neighborhoods". Grenades were also dropped from drones during the attack. A press release issued later that day from the office of interim Prime Minister Joseph blamed the attack on "a group of unidentified individuals". A high-ranking Haitian government official described the attackers as "mercenaries".

== Manhunt ==
=== Manhunt, gun battle, and arrests ===
The Haitian National Police engaged the alleged assassins after they left Moïse's residence. Helen La Lime, the Special Representative of the UN Secretary-General for Haiti, said that some of the gunmen holed up in two buildings in Port-au-Prince. Police chief Léon Charles said later in the day that the police were still engaged in battle with the gunmen. Three policemen were taken hostage but later rescued after police surrounded a house where some of the suspects were hiding. A shootout between the gunmen and police erupted. Three Colombian men were killed during the gunfight with the police. Eighteen more Colombians and two Haitian-Americans were arrested.

Angry civilians joined the search for the assailants, and helped police track down some who were hiding in bushes. Other civilians set fire to three of the suspects' cars, resulting in the destruction of evidence, with the police chief calling for calm. Eleven of the suspects broke into Taiwan's embassy courtyard in Pétion-Ville, not far from the president's residence, on 8 July, and Haitian police (who were allowed access to the building after Taiwan waived extraterritoriality) arrested them without encountering any resistance. The remaining five suspected attackers went on the run. One of them, Mario Antonio Palacios, was later arrested in Jamaica in October. He was arrested by authorities of Panama on 3 January 2022 after being deported from Jamaica and transferred to the custody of the United States.

A manhunt was ongoing to arrest the people who orchestrated the attack. As of 30 July 2021, 44 suspects had been arrested, including 18 Colombians, three Haitian-Americans, 12 Haitian police officers, and six other Haitian civilians. A Haitian businessman, Samir Handal, was arrested in November by Turkey in connection with the assassination. He was arrested over renting an office to one of the masterminds and accused of participating in meetings of "political character". The 37th High Criminal Court of Istanbul however rejected extraditing him to Haiti on 4 July 2022, ruling that the reasons for it were not sufficient. On 8 January 2022, businessman Rodolphe Jaar was arrested as a suspect in the case while entering the Dominican Republic, after the US requested it. On 14 January John Joël Joseph, a former senator and political opponent of Moïse, was arrested by the Jamaica Constabulary Force in Jamaica as one of the prominent suspects. His family members were also arrested alongside him. A former police officer, who was part of the security team guarding Moïse on the day of assassination, was arrested in the Dominican Republic and handed over to Haiti on 2 March. Former rebel leader Miradieu Faustin and Divisional Police Inspector Emmanuel Louis were arrested for their alleged involvement in December. Arrests of Intriago, Ortiz, Veintemilla and Frederick Joseph Bergmann Jr. were announced by American authorities on 14 February 2023, taking the number of suspects in American custody to eleven. Key suspect Joseph-Félix Badio was arrested on 19 October 2023 by the Haitian Police.

=== Suspects ===
The accused assassins were identified as 28 foreigners, of whom 26 were Colombian and two American of Haitian descent. Three of the Colombians were killed by the police in a shootout. Interim Prime Minister Claude Joseph described the suspects as highly trained and heavily armed foreign mercenaries, a description that was corroborated by the Haitian Ambassador to the United States Bocchit Edmond. The group members spoke in both Spanish and English. At least 21 suspected assailants are known to be former servicemen of the National Army of Colombia. Most of the soldiers had retired before the COVID-19 pandemic in Colombia. According to the United States Department of Defense, some of them had taken part in military training and education programs organized by the United States in the past.

The two arrested Haitian-Americans were identified as being from South Florida. While they were in custody, they reported to authorities that they found Moïse already dead when the group arrived at his home. Both of them said that they were only acting as translators and that originally the action was planned to "arrest", not kill, the president. One of them was later confirmed to be an occasional informant for the DEA by the agency. Haitian police said on 11 July that they had arrested Sanon; he was accused of hiring some of the mercenaries.

On 14 July, Haitian police announced the arrest of Gilbert Dragon, a leader of the former National Revolutionary Front for the Liberation and Reconstruction of Haiti rebel group which had taken part in the 2004 Haitian coup d'état. Reynaldo Corvington, who owns the private security company Corvington Courier & Security Service, was also detained. The police meanwhile sought former senator John Joël Joseph and the Venezuelan owner of the Florida-based CTU Security as suspects. One of the suspects being sought is Joseph-Félix Badio, a former employee of the Ministry of Justice and Public Security and the government's anti-corruption department who was fired in May 2013 for breaking its ethics rules. Dragon died in custody due to complications from COVID-19 on 17 November.

Jaar—who was a former DEA informant and was jailed in 2013 by the United States for stealing drugs which were meant to be seized by the DEA—was also a suspect. He had attended a meeting with other suspects and Corvington regarding the mission on 8 June. An arrest warrant was issued against Wendelle Coq Thélot, a former judge of the Court of Cassation, on 23 July, on charges of murder and armed robbery in relation to the assassination. She had been fired by Moïse in February 2021. The Haitian National Police spokesperson, General Marie Michelle Verrier, stated on 30 July that the Colombian and Haitian-American suspects had told the police that they had been to Thélot's home twice and also gave details of agreements that were signed there. Thélot died in January 2025. In March 2023, Haitian Police spokesman Garry Desrosiers stated that the police had identified additional suspects in the assassination, but none of the new suspects had been arrested. One of the suspects was Vitel'Homme Innocent, leader of the Kraze Barye gang. Arrest warrants were also issued for eight police officers.

On 14 February 2023, U.S. authorities arrested four men in Florida (three U.S. citizens and one Colombian national) in connection with the assassination, including Intriago and Veintemilla. The suspects were accused of financing the attack and smuggling ballistic vests for the assassins. Authorities alleged that the men had hoped to receive construction contracts in exchange for their role in the assassination plot. One of the suspects, Frederick Bergmann, a South Floridian businessman and friend of Sanon, provided bulletproof vests used in the operation after he was asked by Sanon. He was unaware of the plot to kill Moïse. Phénil Gordon Désir, wanted over the assassination since July 2021, was arrested on 28 October 2026 by the Central Directorate of the Judicial Police of Haiti.

== Investigation ==
Haiti's chief prosecutor Bed-Ford Claude confirmed plans to bring Moïse's top bodyguards in for questioning, including Jean Laguel Civil, the head of the presidential guard, and Dimitri Hérard, the presidential palace's head of security. The independent Haitian Center for Analysis and Research on Human Rights questioned how the attackers gained entry to the president's bedroom and carried out their attack without killing or injuring any member of the presidential guard. NPR reporter John Otis said, "none of the president's security guards were killed or injured in the attack, and that's a little suspicious... whatever the Colombians were up to, Haitian officials are saying that they definitely were not the masterminds of this assassination." Opposition Senator and 2015 presidential candidate Steven Benoît blamed the president's security detail for the attack, saying the president "was assassinated by his security agents. It wasn't the Colombians."

The Haitian National Police on 14 July identified one of the suspects as Antonio Intriago, owner of the CTU Security company in Florida, adding that he had signed a contract in Haiti but gave no further details, stating that the investigation was in advanced stages. Homes of two suspects, one of them being former rebel leader Gilbert Dragon, were also searched, leading to discovery of many weapons. Three other suspects are also being sought, including one who allegedly provided houses and sirens to the assassins, and former senator John Joël Joseph. One of the suspects, Joseph Felix Badio, who is a former government employee, was blamed by the Colombian National Police chief General Jorge Luis Vargas Valencia for having ordered two of the suspected assailants to kill Moïse several days before the operation.

Police also arrested five officials who were part of the president's security in connection with the assassination. One of those arrested was Dimitri Hérard, the chief of the General Security Unit of the National Palace, which is responsible for guarding the President's residence. 24 police officers who protected Moïse were also being questioned.

Colombian media said Hérard allegedly visited Colombia a few weeks before the assassination, and the Center for Economic and Policy Research reported he is being investigated by US law enforcement for links to arms trafficking. Between January and May 2021, he made seven trips from and to Colombia, Dominican Republic and Ecuador. He had allegedly used an Ecuadorian identification document to travel from and to Haiti. On 22 July 2021, the Ecuadorian President Guillermo Lasso confirmed Hérard had access to an Ecuadorian identity card due to his scholarship at the Eloy Alfaro Higher School of Military.

The Haitian police arrested Jean Laguel Civil on 26 July. On 3 August, Haiti's government requested help from the United Nations to conduct an international investigation into the assassination. Haitian officials investigating the case meanwhile reported that they were receiving death threats and were forced to go into hiding after the authorities ignored their requests for protection. They also accused the police of procedural violations. Judge Mathieu Chanlatte who was investigating the case withdrew from it on 13 August citing personal reasons. The withdrawal came a day after one of his assistants had mysteriously died.

Claude invited acting Prime Minister Ariel Henry for an interview on 10 September, concerning two telephone calls the prosecutor was aware that Henry had with Joseph-Félix Badio, a mastermind of the assassination. The calls, lasting seven minutes, were made at 4:07 am and 4:20 am the morning of the assassination from near Moïse's home. Henry declined the invitation. As a result, Claude requested to the judge investigating the case that charges be filed against Henry and ordered that he be barred from leaving Haiti.

The Prime Minister tried firing Claude to replace him with Frantz Louis Juste, but he remained in his position because Henry did not have the authority to fire the prosecutor. On 16 September, Henry's office stated that many people had called him to inquire about his safety after the assassination and they could not identify every caller, while rejecting the suspicions raised against him.

According to the Haitian National Police investigative report obtained by the Miami Herald in late September 2021, Dragon was in contact with one of the police officers who was guarding Moïse and acting as an informant for the masterminds of the attack. The report also accuses him of designing DEA tags for the assailants. Meanwhile, Hérard was stated to have known three of the suspects and acted as an informant, while supplying the attackers with weapons according to the arrested suspects. Divisional Commissioner Jean Laguel Civil was stated to have bribed 80 of Moïse's guards with $80,000 according to the suspects. One of the people called by Badio about 290 times, including during the night of the assassination when the former was in Pétion-Ville, was also in contact with Jaar 203 times during the same time period.

An investigative report published by The New York Times in January 2022 stated that Prime Minister Henry had links with Badio and the two stayed in close contact even after the assassination. Two Haitian officials told the newspaper that Badio entered Henry's residence twice without being impeded by the guards, despite being wanted. Another of the prime suspects, Rodolphe Jaar, while admitting to having financed and planned the assassination, stated that Badio had described Henry as someone he could count on as an ally and could control after overthrowing Moïse. Jaar claimed that Badio had sought Henry's help in escaping, to which he agreed. He also stated that they planned to make Wendelle Coq-Thélot the new president and that Badio had sought the help of police chief Frantz Elbé in procuring weapons. Elbé however refused stating that he did not have the weapons, but did not try to stop the plot.

Chanlatte's replacement Garry Orélien stepped down from the case on 21 January citing personal reasons. His resignation came after allegations of corruption against him. On 8 February, a recording of Orélien was obtained by CNN, in which Orélien stated that Henry had a role in planning the assassination of Moïse and was friends with the masterminds. This claim was also backed by multiple Haitian law enforcement officials who had investigated the assassination as well, and who also told CNN that Henry was obstructing the investigation. When contacted by CNN, Orélien stated that he did not remember discussing the case with anyone in great detail, stating that "lots of people" were trying to influence it and that he would "not play their game." Later in an interview with Radio Television Caraïbes, he denied accusing Henry while claiming that the CNN report intended to end his career and force him to go into exile or be killed.

Chavannes Étienne was appointed as the replacement for Orélien in early February, but he stated that he had not decided whether he would accept to take over the case due to risks to his life. He tendered his resignation on 11 February. Merlan Belabre was appointed to take over the investigation on 3 March. He decided to step down after his mandate expired on 25 April. Walther Wesser Voltaire was later appointed to oversee the investigation on 31 May.

Four major suspects in the case including Sanon, James Solages, Joseph Vincent and Germán Rivera García were transferred to US custody in January 2024 for prosecution.

In February 2024, 51 people were charged with being involved in the assassination. Moïse's widow Martine Moïse and former Prime Minister Claude Joseph were charged with "complicity and criminal association" regarding the assassination. Former police chief Léon Charles was also indicted, being charged for murder, attempted murder, possession and illegal carrying of weapons, conspiracy against the internal security of the state and criminal association. Joseph said that Prime Minister Henry had undermined the investigation and was the main person who benefited from the assassination. The indictments did not identify who ordered and financed the assassination.

The hearings for the trial were paused due to the gang war in Haiti and resumed in May 2025. On 13 October, a court of appeals overturned the 2024 indictments and ordered a new investigation under Denis Cyprien.

== Trial in the U.S. ==
American law has been applied due to planning for the assassination having occurred in the United States. Mario Antonio Palacios, a 43-year-old Colombian ex-military commando, was arrested in October 2021 for illegally entering Jamaica and was supposed to be deported to Colombia in January 2022. While on a layover in Panama, Palacios agreed to cooperate with federal authorities and travel voluntarily to the United States, which had an Interpol red notice against him, instead of travelling back to Colombia. He appeared in a court in Miami on 4 January 2022 and was charged by the United States Department of Justice with "conspiracy to commit murder or kidnapping outside the United States and providing material support resulting in death, knowing that such support would be used to carry out the conspiracy to kill or kidnap." He was the first suspect to be charged by American authorities. Palacios was part of the "Delta Team", a five-man group of former Colombian military officers that entered Moïse's residence to gun him down. He was the only one who managed to evade authorities and escape. He pled guilty and was sentenced to life in prison.

Jaar agreed to cooperate and travel voluntarily to the United States after being arrested in the Dominican Republic. He was charged by a court in Miami in January 2022 with conspiring to commit murder. According to the complaint, he provided housing for 20 of the Colombians involved in the assassination. He was also accused of providing weapons, being present when another suspect obtained signatures of a former judge for a request for assistance in arresting and imprisoning Moïse, meeting with a co-conspirator and helping his co-conspirators hide after the assassination. Jaar pleaded guilty and was sentenced to life in prison.

John Joël Joseph was extradited to the US in May 2022 and charged with "conspiring to commit murder or kidnapping", as well as providing material support which resulted in Moïse's assassination. The prosecutors accused him of acquiring cars and attempting to procure weapons for the assailants, meeting with co-conspirators a day before the assassination and being fiercely dedicated to eliminating Moïse. Joseph pleaded guilty and was sentenced to life in prison.

Sanon, Solages, Vincent and Garcia were charged on 1 February 2023 at a federal American court in Miami. Solages, Vincent and Garcia were charged with conspiring to commit murder or kidnapping outside the U.S., and providing material support and resources resulting in death. Sanon meanwhile was charged with conspiring to smuggle goods from the United States and cause export information not to be filed, as well as with smuggling goods from the United States and providing unlawful export information. Garcia and Vincent pleaded guilty and were sentenced to life in prison.

Intriago, Ortiz and Veintemilla were charged with "conspiracy to provide material support and resources to a conspiracy to kidnap or kill outside the United States, resulting in death; providing material support and resources to a conspiracy to kidnap or kill outside the United States, resulting in death; and conspiracy to kill or kidnap a person outside the United States"; while Bergmann was charged with conspiracy to commit export violations and submitting false and misleading export information. Bergmann pleaded guilty and was sentenced to nine years in prison.

On May 8, 2026, a federal jury in Miami found Ortiz, Intriago, Veintemilla, and Solages guilty of conspiring to assassinate President Moïse. The four were convicted on multiple counts, including conspiracy to commit murder or kidnapping outside the United States. According to the prosecutors, the men had recruited Colombian mercenaries to carry out the July 2021 attack. The defense argued that they believed they were acting on a legitimate Haitian court order to remove, not kill, Moïse.

On 20 September 2026, Haiti extradited 18 suspects to the United States to stand trial for the assassination. Among them were 17 Colombian ex-soldiers and Joseph-Félix Badio. The Haitian Ministry of Justice and Security stated that the unstable condition of the Haitian court system, a desire to proceed with the prosecutions, and hope that information from their trials might help ongoing criminal investigations led to the transfers. The FBI also indicted 11 new suspects, including Samir Handal, Vitel'Homme Innocent, the leader of the Kraze Baryè gang, and Ashkard Pierre, an advisor to Sanon, bringing the total number of indictments in the case to 30. Handal was arrested by the FBI on the same date.

On 18 November 2026, Sanon was convicted on all counts following an eight-week trial, including for conspiring to murder Moïse. Sanon had admitted taking part in a plan to oust Moïse, but denied any knowledge of a plan to kidnap or kill him and argued that he had abandoned the plan.

== Aftermath ==
The Toussaint Louverture International Airport was closed on 7 July, with planes sent back to their origins. Dozens of Haitians started gathering at the U.S. Embassy in Port-au-Prince on 8 July, hoping to seek asylum in the United States because of the insecurity created by Moïse's assassination, after rumours circulated stating that the United States was going to give out visas to Haitians on humanitarian grounds. Gang violence meanwhile increased in the country following the assassination. Joseph requested the United Nations on 7 July to deploy peacekeeping troops to his country until the situation was stabilised. The country also requested deployment of troops from the United States, but the request was denied.

Jimmy Chérizier, one of the most powerful gang bosses in Haiti and the leader of the G9 gang federation, on 10 July called the assassination of the president a "national and international conspiracy" against Haiti, while blaming the police, opposition politicians and the business class of being behind the killing. He called on his men to protest against the assassination and warned that his followers would commit violence, while adding that it was time for black people of Haiti to take back control of the business sector from those of Syrian and Lebanese descent.

Martine Moïse was treated at a hospital in Miami. On 10 July she posted an audio message to her Twitter account, calling on Haiti to "not lose its way" and accusing unnamed people of assassinating her husband to stall a democratic transition of power. She posted photos of herself recovering in the hospital bed to Twitter on 14 July and thanked the medical team that saved her. On 17 July, she returned to Haiti following her release from the hospital. Martine was awarded $5,305,387 in compensation from six convicts in the case tried in Miami under a restitution order by a federal judge in June 2024. Her and Jovenel's eldest son Joverlein Moïse was meanwhile awarded $865,396.

The funeral for Moïse was held on 23 July at his family compound near Cap-Haïtien, amidst a tense atmosphere. Some of the mourners heckled the Haitian officials and politicians, leading to firing of tear gas and gunshots by the police, while foreign diplomats left the funeral earlier. A day before the funeral, protesters had also tried to stop mourners from being able to attend it. Prime Minister Ariel Henry declared 7 July as a national holiday for Haiti on the first anniversary of the assassination.

=== Succession ===
A 2012 amendment to the Constitution states that the Council of Ministers, under the Presidency of the Prime Minister, exercises the Executive Power until the election of another President. The constitution also stipulates that the National Assembly will elect a provisional president. Complicating matters further, the delay in legislative elections has made the Assembly essentially defunct. Joseph condemned the attack and declared a two-week nationwide state of siege later that day.

Shortly before his assassination, Moïse had selected Henry to replace Joseph as the prime minister, but Henry did not assume the role before the assassination. Henry declared himself to be the rightful prime minister after Moïse's assassination. After the United States chose to support Joseph, Henry stated that it had made a mistake. He however has stated that he is avoiding a conflict over the issue, so as to not worsen the situation in the country. Joseph announced on 8 July 2021 that legislative elections would still be held in September despite the assassination, stating that, "The Head of Government promises to hold talks with opposition leaders and other actors in national life to calm the socio-political climate and facilitate inclusive and credible elections according to the timetable set by the Provisional Electoral Council."

Eight out of ten sitting members of Haiti's Senate chose the Senate speaker Joseph Lambert as the interim president on 9 July. They also selected Henry to become the prime minister. A dozen political parties also signed an accord calling for Lambert to be installed as the president. Joseph however rejected the Senate's decision, stating he did not want a power struggle, and the new president should be chosen in the elections.

A group of prominent diplomats called the "Core Group", which is made up of ambassadors to Haiti from Brazil, the European Union and the United States, in addition to representatives to Haiti from the Organization of American States and the United Nations, urged for creation of "a consensual and inclusive government." It also encouraged Henry to form a government, a task which had been entrusted to him by the late president, and called on individuals involved in the political, economic and civil society sectors to support the authorities in restoring security. Joseph told The Washington Post on 19 July that he would be relinquishing his powers as the leader of Haiti and handing the charge to Henry. Henry was sworn in on 20 July 2021.

== International reactions ==
Dominican Republic President Luis Abinader closed the border with Haiti and convened an urgent meeting of military commanders in response to the assassination. The country also banned air travel to Haiti. The diplomatic staff of the Dominican Republic stationed in Haiti was meanwhile evacuated by the Dominican Air Force from Toussaint Louverture International Airport. International condemnation of the attack included statements from the governments of Argentina, The Bahamas, Canada, Chile, Colombia, France, India, Mexico, Taiwan, Russia, the United Kingdom, the United States, and the Holy See through Pope Francis himself, as well as the Organization of American States and the United Nations Security Council. Suriname declared three days of mourning with flags half mast from 8 to 10 July. Caribbean Community ordered national flags and the CARICOM Standard at half-mast for three days beginning immediately, as well as on the day of the funeral.

On 15 July, US President Joe Biden announced that the United States government would be deploying the United States Marine Corps in order to protect the U.S. Embassy in Port-au-Prince. The Department of State appointed Daniel Lewis Foote as a special envoy to Haiti, tasking him to work with local and international officials in order to stabilise Haiti, while also trying to support holding of free and fair elections. Marta Lucía Ramírez, the Vice President and Foreign Minister of Colombia, called on Haiti in late July to ensure the legal rights of the Colombian suspects were respected and they were given proper medical care. She further stated that a consular mission had found irregularities in their detention, in addition to them not being provided lawyers. She also added that some of the suspects had been wounded during their arrest and did not receive medical care.
