= Vérité (political party) =

Political party in Haiti

Truth Platform Plateforme Vérité Platfom Verite
- Abbreviation: Vérité
- Founder: René Préval
- Split from: Inite
- Headquarters: Port-au-Prince

Plateforme Vérité (English: Truth Platform) was a Haitian political party co-founded by former president René Préval. After the 2015–16 legislative elections, Vérité emerged as the second largest party behind only the PHTK, winning 17 seats in the Chamber of Deputies and three in the Senate. (Note: Since January 10, 2023, both bodies of Haitian parliament have been completely vacant, after all legislative terms expired, and no elections have been held in Haiti since 2016.)

Vérité's candidate for the 2015 presidential election, Jacky Lumarque, at the time the rector of Quisqueya University, was removed from the official ballot by the Conseil Électoral Provisoire (CEP), Haiti's official election body. According to the CEP, they were unable to obtain a document showing that Lumarque had not misused public money during his tenure as a member of a governmental education commission during the presidency of René Préval, although the Court of Auditors held that he did not require such a document, since he was not tasked with the handling of public money as a member of the commission. Citing this, as well as violence against polling stations and voting centers in the first round of the elections, the party decided to withdraw from the second round.

In 2017, the party split over disagreement considering the legitimacy of the presidency of Jovenel Moïse. Several prominent figures within the party decided to stop opposing the Moïse government, reversing the party's prior stance. René Monplaisir, a left-wing figure within the party who was previously a pro-Lavalas figure in Cité Soleil, rejected the decision and maintained his anti-Moïse stance, saying, "Platform Vérité does not exist anymore!" While remnants of the party have continued on, it does not exist in the same configuration that it once did and does not exert the same level of power or influence.

In 2015, the Conseil Électoral Provisoire, Haiti's central election body, accused Vérité of election-day disruptions in the Nord, Ouest, and Sud departments.
