= Paul Denis (Haiti politician) =

Haitian politician (1942/1943 – 2024)

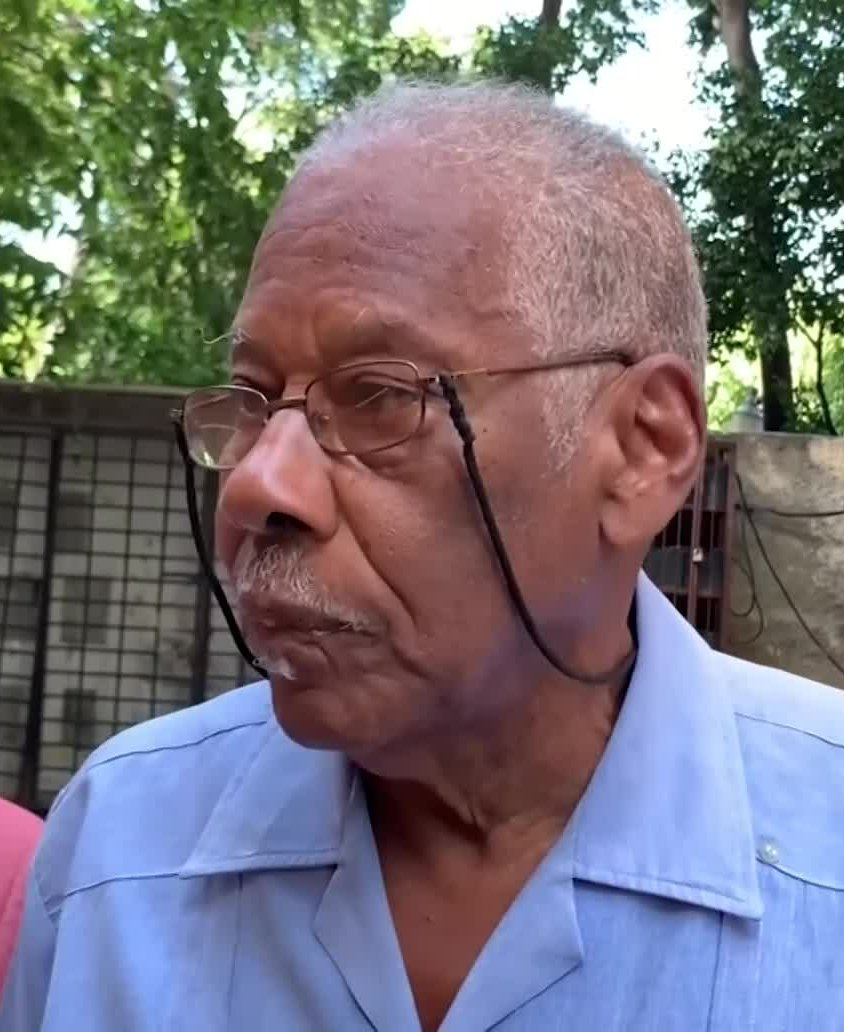

Minister of Justice and Public Security
- In office 11 November 2009 – 27 June 2011
- President: René Préval
- Prime Minister: Jean-Max Bellerive
- Preceded by: Jean-Joseph Exumé
- Succeeded by: Jean-Max Bellerive

Personal details
- Born: 1942/1943
- Died: 11 March 2024 (aged 81) Port-Salut, Haiti
- Party: Inifos
- Other political affiliations: Inite (until 2019)

Paul Denis (1942/1943 – 11 March 2024) was a Haitian politician. He served as Justice Minister of Haiti from 11 November 2009 to 27 June 2011. He also served as one-third of the Tripartite Council which appointed the seven-member Council of Sages which took power in the immediate aftermath of the 2004 Haiti Rebellion which overthrew former president Jean-Bertrand Aristide, of whom Denis was a vocal opponent.

The 2010 Haiti earthquake destroyed the Ministry of Justice building and Denis, who was working in his office at the time, was one of several politicians initially reported dead. However, Denis was able to exit the building in time but many of his staffers and advisers were killed.

Before the quake, he had been campaigning in the presidential phase of the 2006 Haitian elections on behalf of the OPL.

Accused in the assassination of President Jovenel Moïse on 7 July 2021, he was cleared by judge Walter Wesser Voltaire in charge of the investigation. Denis died in Port-Salut on 11 March 2024, at the age of 81.
