= Jean Marie Ralph Féthière =

Haitian senator

Jean Marie Ralph Féthière is a Haitian politician. He is a Senator from the north and a member of the PHTK party. On September 23, 2019, while trying to leave Parliament amid a crowd as the government was voting to confirm a new prime minister, Féthière drew a handgun and fired toward the crowd. Dieu-Nalio Chery, a photographer for the Associated Press, suffered injuries to his face from bullet fragments, while a security guard named Leon Leblanc was also injured.
