= John Joël Joseph =

Haitian-American politician

John Joël Joseph (born 1971), also known as Joseph Joel John, is a Haitian-American politician and convicted felon who was a member of the Senate of Haiti.

== Career ==
Joseph was a member of the Senate of Haiti, the upper house of the Haitian Parliament.

== Conviction ==
Six days after the assassination of Jovenel Moïse in July 2021, a police warrant for his arrest was launched. Haitian National Police Chief Léon Charles said that Joseph was a mastermind of the plot, furnishing the attackers with weapons and organizing meetings. In January 2022 he was arrested in Jamaica under suspicion of the president's murder. On 10 May 2022 he was charged with conspiracy in connection to the murder. On 19 December 2023, he was sentenced to life in prison.
