= Maryse Narcisse =

Haitian politician (born 1958)

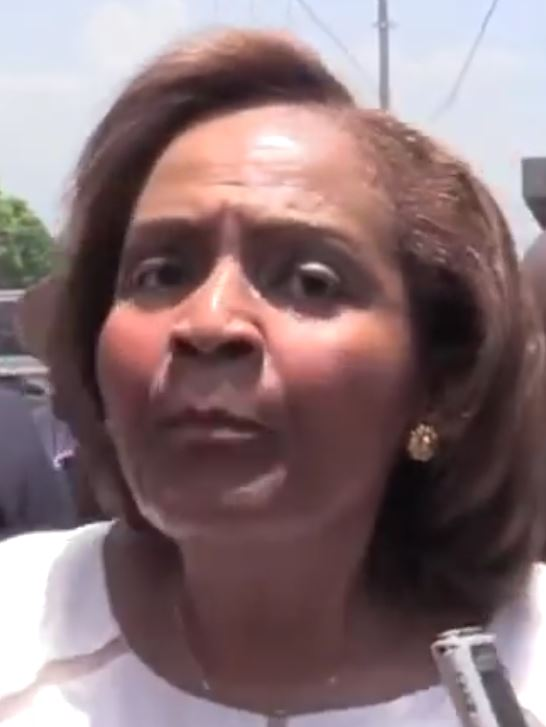
- Maryse Narcisse in 2016

Personal details
- Born: 1958 (age 67–68) Pétion-Ville, Port-au-Prince, Haiti
- Party: Fanmi Lavalas
- Children: 1
- Education: Tulane University
- Profession: Medical doctor

Maryse Narcisse (born 1958) is a Haitian politician and doctor. She was a candidate in the 2015 and 2016 presidential elections from the party Fanmi Lavalas. She placed fourth in both elections, despite her supporters claiming victory in the latter. Narcisse had previously worked as a spokesperson for former Haitian president Jean-Bertrand Aristide, who later supported her during her presidential campaign.

== Biography ==
Maryse Narcisse was born in Pétion-Ville. She is the daughter of Denise Péan Narcisse, a teacher, and Marc Narcisse, a judge. She holds a master's in Public Health from Tulane University in the United States, and her Doctorate of Medicine from the State University of Haiti. She was married twice, the first time when she was 23, and she has one son.

Narcisse ran as the Fanmi Lavalas party candidate in the 2015 Haitian presidential election. She placed fourth in the election with 108,844 votes. However, Narcisse along with several other candidates rejected the results. A panel investigating the results found evidence of fraud and recommended that the results be annulled and a new election be held.

She again ran as the Fanmi Lavalas candidate during the 2016 presidential election. Her 2016 campaign was endorsed by the former Haitian president Jean-Bertrand Aristide, who campaigned alongside her. Narcisse had previously worked as Aristide's spokesperson while he was in exile in South Africa. Early reports of the results indicated a close race between Jovenel Moïse and Narcisse, with her supporters claiming she had won and clashing with police in Port-au-Prince. However, election officials cautioned against claims of victory before an official announcement. In the official results, she again placed fourth with 95,765 votes.

In February 2026, she represented Fanmi Lavalas at the signing of the "National Pact for Stability and the Organization of Elections" by several other parties and civil society groups.
