= Rony Célestin =

Haitian politician

Rony Célestin is a Haitian politician from the PHTK party. He represents the Centre department. Célestin was sanctioned by the Government of Canada for allegedly supporting illegal activities of armed criminal gangs and the United States Government for abuse of his public position and corrupt activity.

== Controversy ==
In July 2021 the Canadian newspaper La Presse reported that Célestin's wife had purchased a luxury mansion in Quebec. The $3.4 million villa was reportedly paid in cash with no mortgage. The news attracted criticism from Haitians activists accusing Célestin of corruption and sparked an investigation into the purchase by the Haitian government's Anti-Corruption Unit.

On November 22, 2022, the Government of Canada seized houses belonging to Célestin and his wife due to sanctions imposed against him.

== Canadian Government Sanctions Against Célestin ==
On November 19, 2022, the Government of Canada imposed sanctions against Célestin, former Senator from the Sud department Hervé Fourcand and former representative Gary Bodeau. The sanctions against Célestin was a response to his alleged involvement in "illegal activities of armed criminal gangs, including money laundering and other acts of corruption."

== American Government Visa Sanctions Against Célestin and Immediate Family Members ==
On December 9, 2022, the U.S. Department of State designated Célestin and four immediate family members for Section 7031(c) visa sanctions for "abusing his public position by participating in corrupt activity that undermined the integrity of Haiti’s government."
