= Gilbert Dragon =

Haitian police chief (1969–2021)

Marie Jude Gilbert Dragon (1969 – 17 November 2021) was a Haitian police chief and guerrilla commander.

== Biography ==
He served as a police chief for the commune of Croix-des-Bouquets in the early 2000s, during which he became involved with other police chiefs' efforts to overthrow the Haitian government. During the conflict, which culminated in the 2004 Haitian coup d'état, Dragon became second-in-command in the National Revolutionary Front for the Liberation and Reconstruction of Haiti under Guy Philippe. On 14 July 2021, Haitian police announced that Dragon had been arrested in connection with the assassination of Haitian president Jovenel Moïse.

Dragon died from complications of COVID-19 on 17 November 2021, at the age of 52.
