= Ginette Michaud Privert =

First Lady of Haiti
- In role February 14, 2016 – February 7, 2017
- President: Jocelerme Privert
- Preceded by: Sophia Martelly
- Succeeded by: Martine Moïse

Personal details
- Born: Ginette Michaud; March 14, 1956 (age 70) Port-au-Prince, Haiti
- Spouse: Jocelerme Privert (m. 1988)
- Children: Nandie; Fadha; Nadia
- Education: Université d'État d'Haïti
- Occupation: Physician; Radiologist

Ginette Michaud Privert (born March 14, 1956) is a Haitian physician, radiologist, and diplomat. She served as the First Lady of Haiti from February 2016 until February 2017 during the provisional presidency of her husband, Jocelerme Privert.

== Biography ==
Ginette Michaud was born on March 14, 1956, in Port-au-Prince and raised on the city's Bolosse Avenue. Her parents were also from Port-au-Prince. Michaud is a Baptist Christian.

She attended a public school and then the Maranatha Evangelical college for elementary school. Michaud then enrolled at Roger Anglade collège (junior high school) and before graduating from lycée des Jeunes Filles. Following high school, Michaud was admitted to the Faculty of Medicine at the State University of Haiti, where she received her medical degree in 1984. Michaud completed her medical internship in Port-de-Paix, Nord-Ouest department.

Michaud returned to Port-au-Prince, where she specialized in radiology at the Hôpital de l'Université d'État d'Haïti (HUEH). She opened her first radiology clinic in 1994. She worked as radiology for the Ministry of Health's Sanatorium for almost twenty years, as well as the Hôpital OFATMA in Port-au-Prince for fifteen years, and almost ten years at Food for the Poor.

Michaud met her future husband, Jocelerme Privert, in 1986. The couple married in 1988 and had three daughters - Nandie, Fadha, and Nadia.

She worked as a diplomat at the Haitian Embassy to the Dominican Republic in Santo Domingo for six years from 2012 to 2016. She left her diplomatic posting when her husband became interim President of Haiti in 2016.

Michaud worked at Haiti Adventist Hospital (Hopital Adventiste d’Haïti) in Carrefour from 1985 to 1986. On April 1, 2016, the First Lady attended the opening of a new surgical suite, clinic and laboratory to mark the hospital's 35th anniversary.
