= Sorel Jacinthe =

Haitian senator

Sorel Jacinthe is a politician in Haiti. He was born in 1955.

Jacinthe served as the president of the Chamber of Deputies from 26 April 2011 to January 2012. A former ally of Haiti's president, Jovenel Moise, and a senator in 2019 he was part of the opposition calling for his resignation.
