= Edmonde Supplice Beauzile =

Haitian politician (born 1961)

- Beauzile in 2020

President of the Fusion of Haitian Social Democrats
- Incumbent
- Assumed office 25 September 2011
- Preceded by: Victor Benoit

Senator for Centre
- In office 2006–2012

Member of the Chamber of Deputies for Centre
- In office 1990–1994

Personal details
- Born: 14 October 1961 (age 65) Belladère, Haiti
- Party: Fusion of Haitian Social Democrats
- Education: Université d'État d'Haïti; Université de Montréal

Edmonde Supplice Beauzile (born October 14, 1961) is a Haitian educator and politician who has served as President of the Fusion of Haitian Social Democrats since 2011. She previously served in the Chamber of Deputies from 1990 to 1994 and in the Senate from 2006 to 2012.

== Biography ==
Beauzile was born in Belladère and grew up there and in Maïssade. She was educated at the Lycée Marie-Jeanne and the École Normale Supérieure. She went on to study legal sciences at the Université d'État d'Haïti and received a master's degree in education from the Université de Montréal in 1993. Beauzile served as a member of the Chamber of Deputies from 1990 to 1994 and as a member of the Senate from 2006 to 2012. She also served as the senate's vice-president.

She was elected president of the Fusion of Haitian Social Democrats in September 2011. At its 3rd national congress, held April 20–22, 2018, Beauzile defeated former deputy Daniel Hermogène and was re-elected president of the party.

On 30 August 2018, a group calling itself the Mouvement alternatif pour la démocratie au sein de la Fusion (MAD-FUSION) convened an extraordinary national council. It adopted a resolution purporting to remove Beauzile as president and Rosemond Pradel as secretary-general, and created a provisional committee headed by Pédrica Saint-Jean to organize new elections, which was disputed immediately. Pradel stated Saint-Jean and her supporters had already ceased to be members of the party because of violations of its charter, and remained as president.

Beauzile was considered a serious contender for president of Haiti in the November 2016 Haitian presidential election.
