= Joseph Mécène Jean-Louis =

Haitian judge (1948/1949–2026)

Supreme Court of Haiti

Personal details
- Born: 1948 or 1949 Dessalines, Haiti
- Died: 6 October 2026 (aged 77)

Joseph Mécène Jean-Louis (1948 or 1949 – 6 October 2026) was a Haitian judge serving on the Supreme Court of Haiti who was declared interim president by opponents seeking to end the rule of Jovenel Moïse during the 2018–2021 Haitian protests. Jean-Louis died on 6 October 2026, at the age of 77.
