= Inifos =

- Leader: Serge Vincent
- Founders: Paul Denis; Jean Ardouin Louis Charles; Rosemila Petit Frère
- Founded: 10 May 2019
- Split from: Inite
- Headquarters: Port-au-Prince
- Political position: Centre-left
- Colours: Green, yellow
- Chamber of Deputies: 0 / 119
- Senate: 0 / 30

Inifos (Haitian Creole: Inifòs), is a political party in Haiti founded on 10 May 2019 following claims that its predecessor party, Inite, had dissolved. It is led by former 2006 presidential candidate and Minister of Justice Paul Denis.
