= November 2016 Haitian presidential election =

- 20 November 2016
- Registered: 6,189,253
- Turnout: 18.11%

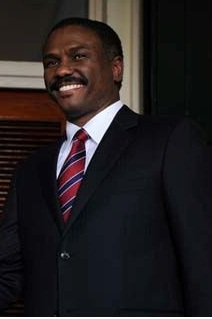

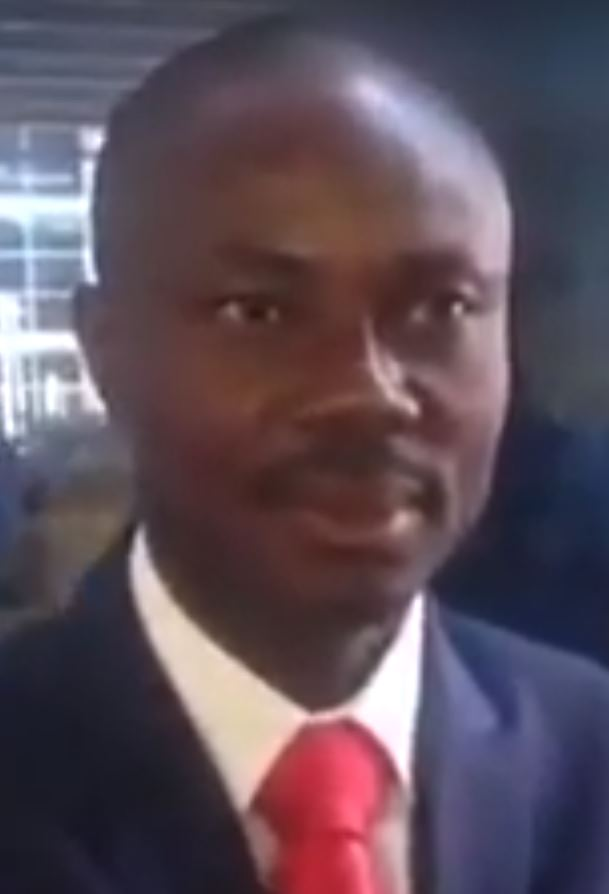

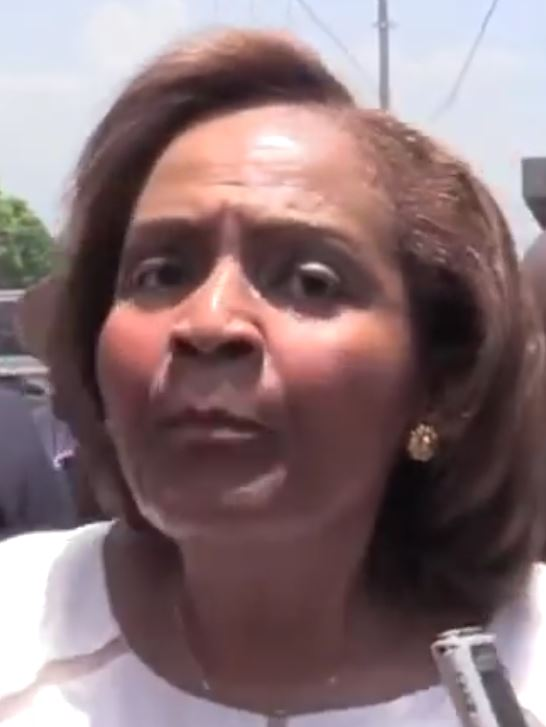
Nominee	Jovenel Moïse	Jude Célestin
Party	PHTK	LAPEH
Popular vote	590,927	207,988
Percentage	55.60%	19.57%
Nominee	Jean-Charles Moïse	Maryse Narcisse
Party	Platfòm Pitit Desalin	Fanmi Lavalas
Popular vote	117,349	95,765
Percentage	11.04%	9.01%
- Results by department Moïse: 40–50% 50–60% 60–70% 70–80%
President before election
Jocelerme Privert (Provisional)
Inite
Elected President
Jovenel Moïse
PHTK

Presidential elections were held in Haiti on 20 November 2016 after having been postponed several times. The elections were overseen by the Provisional Electoral Council (CEP), and were held using the two-round system, with a second round scheduled for 29 January 2017 if no candidate received an absolute majority of the votes in the first round (50% plus one vote). However, on 27 November election officials announced that, according to preliminary results, Jovenel Moïse had won the election in the first round with more than 50% of the vote. Voter turnout, in the election held 6 weeks after Hurricane Matthew hit Haiti, was reported to be 21%. Jovenel Moïse assumed office on 7 February 2017, and was assassinated on 7 July 2021.

== Background ==
Following massive protests arising from the 2015 election, the runoff election originally scheduled to be held on 27 December 2015 was postponed several times, with the last one scheduled to be held in October 2016. However, the Conseil Electoral Provisoire (CEP) announced on 5 April 2016 that fresh elections would be held on 9 October with a possible runoff on 8 January 2017. The first round planned for 9 October was subsequently postponed due to the passage of Hurricane Matthew.

== Electoral system ==
The President of Haiti is elected using the two-round system, with a second round held if no candidate wins a majority of the vote in the first round.

== Candidates ==
A total of 27 candidates ran for president, but only six actively campaigned and were seen as serious contenders: Edmonde Supplice Beauzile (Fusion Social Democrats), Jean-Henry Céant (Renmen Ayiti, "Love Haiti"), Jude Célestin (LAPEH/Peace), Jean-Charles Moïse (Pitit Desalin), Jovenel Moïse (Parti Haïtien Tèt Kale), and Maryse Narcisse (Fanmi Lavalas). Each of the six, except for Beauzile, "have had strong ties to one or more of the former elected presidents: Michel Martelly, René Préval and Jean-Bertrand Aristide."

== Opinion polls ==
Pollster	Dates administered	Moïse (PHTK)	Célestin (LAPEH)	Moïse (Pitit Dessalin)	Narcisse (Fanmi Lavalas)	Céant (Renmen Ayiti)	Supplice (Fusion)
BRIDES	13–16 November 2016	54.5%	20.7%	11.6%	6.7%	1.0%	0.7%
BRIDES	28 September–1 October 2016	54%	23.3%	12.0%	7.0%	0.7%	0.6%
BRIDES	8–15 August 2016	41%	25.2%	12.5%	7.6%	1.8%	0.6%

== Results ==
Supporters of Maryse Narcisse claimed early reports indicated a close race between her and Jovenel Moïse. While counting was still ongoing, both Moïse's Haitian Tèt Kale Party (PHTK) party and Narcisse's Fanmi Lavalas party claimed victory, although official results were not yet issued and the CEP's cautioned against making such claims.

Jovenel Moïse won more than double the votes of any other candidate and more than half of all votes, avoiding the need for a second round.

Candidate	Party	Votes	%
Jovenel Moïse	Haitian Tèt Kale Party	590,927	55.60
Jude Célestin	Alternative League for Haitian Progress and Emancipation	207,988	19.57
Jean-Charles Moïse	Platfòm Pitit Desalin	117,349	11.04
Maryse Narcisse	Fanmi Lavalas	95,765	9.01
Jean-Henry Céant	Renmen Ayiti	8,014	0.75
Edmonde Supplice Beauzile	Fusion of Haitian Social Democrats	6,770	0.64
Maxo Joseph	Randevou	5,336	0.50
Amos André	Front Uni pour la Renaissance d’Haïti	2,270	0.21
Jean Hervé Charles	Parti pour l’Evolution Nationale Haïtienne	1,974	0.19
Joseph Harry Bretous	Konbit Pour Ayiti	1,803	0.17
Marie Antoinette Gauthier	Plan d'Action Citoyenne	1,791	0.17
Jean Clarens Renois	Unir-Ayiti-Ini	1,681	0.16
Daniel Dupiton	Cohésion Nationale des Partis Politiques Haïtiens	1,305	0.12
Gérard Dalvius	Parti Alternative pour le Développement d'Haïti	1,208	0.11
Kesler Dalmacy	MOPANOU	999	0.09
Jean Bertin	Mouvement d'Union République	984	0.09
Jean Ronald Cornely	Rassemblement des Patriotes Haïtiens	980	0.09
Marc-Arthur Drouillard	National Unity Party	970	0.09
Jean Poincy	Résultat	963	0.09
Jacques Sampeur	Konbit Liberasyon Ekonomik	953	0.09
Jean-Chavannes Jeune	CANAAN	936	0.09
Joseph G. Varnel Durandisse	Retabli Ayiti	881	0.08
Roland Magloire	Parti Démocrate Institutionnaliste	817	0.08
Vilaire Clunny Duroseau	Mouveman pou Endepandans Kiltirel Sosyal Ekonomik ak Politik an Ayiti	796	0.07
Monestime Diony	Independent	751	0.07
Luckner Désir	Mobilisation pour Haïti	739	0.07
Nelson Flecourt	Olah Baton jenès la	686	0.06
None of the above		7,203	0.68
Total		1,062,839	100.00
Valid votes		1,062,839	94.84
Invalid/blank votes		57,824	5.16
Total votes		1,120,663	100.00
Registered voters/turnout		6,189,253	18.11
Source: Provisional Electoral Council

== Reactions ==
The United States, Haiti's largest international donor, welcomed the holding of elections. U.S. Department of States spokesman John Kirby said following the first round that the U.S. viewed the elections "as an important step toward returning Haiti to fill constitutional rule and addressing the serious challenges the country faces," but noted that the election had some "isolated incidents of violence and intimidation."

== See also ==
- 2015–16 Haitian parliamentary election
