= 2015 Haitian presidential election =

- 25 October 2015
- Registered: 5,871,450
- Turnout: 28.49%

Nominee	Jovenel Moïse	Jude Célestin
Party	PHTK	LAPEH
Popular vote	508,761	392,782
Percentage	32.76%	25.29%
President before election
Michel Martelly
Repons Peyizan
Elected President
Election results annulled
Jovenel Moïse elected in 2016

Presidential elections were held in Haiti on 25 October 2015, alongside local elections and the second round of the legislative elections. Incumbent President Michel Martelly was constitutionally barred from running. As no candidate received a majority of the vote in the first round, a runoff was to be held on 27 December 2015. On 22 December the Conseil Electoral Provisoire (CEP) announced that the runoff has been postponed indefinitely. However, on 1 January 2016 President Michel Martelly announced that the runoff would be held on 17 January, but on 7 January the President changed the date to 24 January. On 20 January, Jude Célestin issued a statement that calls "whatever the person who will participate in this January 24 [runoff], is a traitor to the Nation". Because of rioting and electoral violence, on 22 January the CEP decided to postpone the second round again, with no specific date given, even after President Michel Martelly confirmed the previous day in a nationwide speech that the election should still take place. The run-off date was later agreed to take place on 24 April 2016.

After the preliminary results were published on 25 October 2015, Jude Célestin said he did not recognize them. His criticism was joined by five other presidential candidates. They issued a joint statement denouncing the results as "anti-democratic" and called for the people's vote to be respected. Martelly openly declared his support for Moïse. The supporters of Célestin protested in the streets, together with the supporters of Jean-Charles Moïse's Platfom Pitit Desalin and supporters of former President Jean-Bertrand Aristide's Fanmi Lavalas party the presidential candidate of which, Maryse Narcisse, finished fourth behind Jean-Charles Moïse and also denounced the results during a news conference. The protesters threw rocks and burned tires. The police responded with tear gas and made some arrests. The police also stopped and searched the vehicle of a former top government prosecutor, Claudy Gassant, who is a supporter of Moïse.

Amid allegations of fraud in the 2015 elections, Martelly resigned the presidency on 10 February 2016, leaving Haiti without a president for a week. The National Assembly elected on 14 February 2016 Jocelerme Privert as provisional President. Privert formed a month-long verification commission to restore legitimacy to the electoral process. In May 2016, the commission audited about 13,000 ballots and determined that the elections had been dishonest and recommended a complete rerun of the election.

On 5 April 2016, the CEP announced that a rerun of the presidential election was to take place on 9 October 2016, alongside the second round of the parliamentary elections that has been suspended and the first round for a third of the Senate.

== Candidates ==
Seventy candidates were initially in the race, including 64 men and six women. Two candidates, Mario Andresol and Diony Monestime, ran as independents. As of 28 May 2015, 41 challenges had been filed against 23 of the 70 candidates, including Andresol and former Prime Minister Laurent Lamothe. The Departmental Bureau of Electoral Disputes heard those disputes, to determine whether those individuals would be excluded from the presidential race.

The final list of 58 candidates was published on 12 June, but in the following days two candidates were removed; Jacky Lumarque (Verité) and Level Francois (Parti de la Diaspora Haitienne pour Haiti), making a new total of 56 candidates.

== Results ==
According to preliminary results posted by the Provisional Electoral Council, Jovenel Moïse obtained 32.81% of the preferences, and Jude Célestin won 25.27%. Voter turnout was reportedly 28.8%.

After the preliminary results were published on 25 October 2015, six candidates disputed the election and denouncing the results as “anti-democratic”. A runoff was initially scheduled for 27 December 2015, but on 22 December the Conseil Electoral Provisoire announced that the runoff was being postponed indefinitely. On 5 April 2016, the CEP announced that a rerun of the presidential election was to take place on 9 October 2016.

Candidate	Party	Votes	%
Jovenel Moïse	Haitian Tèt Kale Party	508,761	32.76
Jude Célestin	Alternative League for Haitian Progress and Emancipation	392,782	25.29
Jean-Charles Moïse	Platfòm Pitit Desalin	222,109	14.30
Maryse Narcisse	Fanmi Lavalas	108,844	7.01
Eric Jean Baptiste	Socialist Action Movement	56,427	3.63
Jean-Henry Céant	Renmen Ayiti	38,898	2.50
Sauveur Pierre Étienne	Struggling People's Organization	30,144	1.94
Irvenson Steven Benoit	Konviksyon	17,796	1.15
Steeve Khawly	Réseau Bouclier National	16,752	1.08
Samuel Madistin	Mouvement Patriotique Populaire Dessalinien	13,640	0.88
Jean-Chavannes Jeune	Canaan	10,477	0.67
Maxo Joseph	Rassemblement des Nationaux Democrates Volontaires pour l'Unité Salvatrice	8,914	0.57
Jean Clarens Renois	Union Nationale pour l'Integrité et la Reconciliation	8,819	0.57
Chavannes Jean Baptiste	Konbit Travaye Peyizan pou Libere Haiti	7,412	0.48
Mario Andrésol	Independent	7,239	0.47
Beauzile Edmone Supplice	Fusion of Haitian Social Democrats	5,876	0.38
Amos André	Front Uni Pour la Renaissance d'Haiti	4,888	0.31
Aviol Fleurant	Nouvelle Haiti	4,886	0.31
Jean Bony Alexandre	Concorde Nationale	4,493	0.29
Daniel Dupiton	Cohésion Nationale des Partis Politiques Haitiens	3,739	0.24
Renold Jean Claude Bazin	Christian Movement for a New Haiti	3,570	0.23
Michel Fred Brutus	Parti Federaliste	3,177	0.20
Joseph G. Varnel Durandisse	Retabli Ayiti	2,809	0.18
Charles Henri Baker	Respect	2,780	0.18
Marie Antoinette Gautier	Plan d'Action Citoyenne	2,769	0.18
Yves Daniel	Pati Kreyol Nouye	2,715	0.17
Jephthé Lucien	Parti Socialiste Unifie Haitien	2,544	0.16
Simon Dieuseul Desras	Plateforme Politique Palmis	2,459	0.16
Westner Polycarpe	Mouvman Revolisyone Ayisyen	2,316	0.15
Jean Hervé Charles	Parti pour l'Evolution Nationale Haitienne	2,148	0.14
Jean Paleme Mathurin	Plateforme Politique G18	2,142	0.14
Jacques Sampeur	Konbit Liberasyon Ekonomik	2,111	0.14
Mathias Pierre	Konsyans Patriyotik	1,939	0.12
Joseph Harry Bretous	Konbit pou Ayiti	1,902	0.12
Dalvius Gerard	Parti Alternative pour le Développement d'Haiti	1,717	0.11
Michelet Nestor	Coalition pour la Convention de la Reconstruction de la Réconciliation des Citoyens Haitiens	1,711	0.11
Fresnel Larosliere	Mouvement pour l'Instauration de la Démocratie en Haiti	1,698	0.11
Newton Louis St Juste	Fwon Revolisyone pou Entegrasyon Mas Yo	1,677	0.11
Jean Wiener Theagene	Parti pour la Rénovation d'Haiti	1,543	0.10
Michel André	Plateforme Jistis	1,270	0.08
Rene Julien	Action Democratique pour Batir Haiti	1,245	0.08
Vilaire Cluny Duroseau	Mouveman pou Endepandans Kiltirel Sosyal Ekonomik ak Politik an Ayiti	1,205	0.08
Antoine Joseph	Delivrans	1,160	0.07
Jean Ronald Cornely	Rassemblement des Patriotes Haitiens	1,159	0.07
Jean Bertin	Mouvement d'Union Republicaine	1,131	0.07
Marc-Arthur Drouillard	National Unity Party	929	0.06
Roland Magloire	Parti Démocrate Institutionnaliste	916	0.06
Emmanuel Joseph Georges Brunet	Plateforme Politique Entrenou	882	0.06
Jean Poncy	Régénération Economique et Sociale dans l'Unité et la Liberté Totale d'Action pour Tous	858	0.06
Kesler Dalmacy	Mopanou	808	0.05
Diony Monestime	Independent	758	0.05
Nelson Flecourt	Olahh Baton Jenes La	757	0.05
Joe Marie Judie Roy	Regroupement Patriotique pour le Renouveau National	678	0.04
Luckner Desir	Mobilisation pour le Progrès d'Haiti	591	0.04
Against all		22,161	1.43
Total		1,553,131	100.00
Valid votes		1,553,131	92.84
Invalid/blank votes		119,800	7.16
Total votes		1,672,931	100.00
Registered voters/turnout		5,871,450	28.49
Source: CEP, IFES

== Aftermath ==
Amid declarations of fraud and numerous delays of an elected government, the Provisional President Jocelerme Privet created a verification commission in May 2016 to audit the results of the August 2015 legislative elections and first round of the presidential elections. On 30 May 2016 the commission, headed by Pierre François Benoît, issued a report recommending the election be redone citing findings of significant fraud.

While Haiti-based organizations found innumerable counts of fraud and proof of unfair elections on October 25, international observers endorsed the results before the interim government's report had been released. According to the U.S. Deputy Spokesman, for example, "The United States regrets the decision by the Provisional Electoral Council to restart the presidential elections from the first round. This will increase time and resources needed to complete the 2015 electoral process and further delay installation of a constitutionally elected president.... The United States regrets that the electoral process has extended yet again, with the president-elect unlikely to be installed before February 7th, 2017." The National Human Rights Defense Network published one of several reports criticizing the happenings on election day, using Haitian observations to bolster claims apparently unseen by many international players.

American officials discouraged rerunning the elections after spending $33 million on funding them. In an April 2016 visit to Haiti, Special Coordinator Kenneth H. Merten said that he hoped the verification process would be "very, very fast" and that it would not change the election results. Secretary of State John Kerry also emphasized the need to accept an elected government, citing the lack of international community patience with further delay. The U.S. Government responded to this report by announcing its refusal to provide funding to complete the Haitian elections. This development may prohibit international observers, often funded by the U.S., from observing the next electoral sessions. While the OAS received $1 million in U.S. funding for the October 25 election, the organization plans to continue observation, following a list of demanded changes to the Haitian electoral process.
