= Jude Célestin =

Haitian politician (born 1962)

- Célestin in 2011

Personal details
- Born: 19 June 1962 (age 64) Port-au-Prince, Haiti
- Party: Patriotic Unity (Before 2015); Alternative League for Haitian Progress and Emancipation (2015–present)

Jude Célestin (born June 19, 1962 in Port-au-Prince) is a Haitian politician who was one of two presidential candidates heading off to the second round in the 2015 presidential election race. After an education in Port-au-Prince, Célestin studied mechanical engineering in Switzerland. Before he was nominated as the presidential candidate for President René Préval's Unity (INITE) party, he was the executive director of the government's construction ministry, the National Center of Equipment.

== 2010 elections ==
Célestin ran as leader of LAPEH (Ligue Alternative pour le Progres et L'Émancipation Haïtienne). The first round of voting took place on November 28, and preliminary results showed law professor and former first lady Mirlande Manigat in first place, with 31.4 percent of the vote. Célestin came next, with 22.5 percent, and singer Michel Joseph Martelly took third place with 21.8 percent. Widespread riots and reports of election fraud followed the announcement of these results. In December, Martelly supporters set fire to the INITE headquarters, located in the Port-au-Prince suburb of Pétion-Ville. On February 3, INITE was forced to drop Célestin from the race. On 4 April 2011, a senior official announced that Michel Martelly won the presidential run-off election against candidate Mirlande Manigat. His LAPEH party urges job creation, fighting juvenile delinquency and providing for thousands of homeless street children in Port-au-Prince.
