= Haitian Tèt Kale Party =

Political party in Haiti

Haitian Tèt Kale Party Parti Haïtien Tèt Kale Pati Ayisyen Tèt Kale
- Abbreviation: PHTK
- Leader: Liné Balthazar
- Founded: 16 August 2012
- Split from: Repons Peyizan
- Headquarters: Port-au-Prince
- Ideology: Liberalism; Conservative liberalism Anti-Duvalierism
- Political position: Centre-right
- Colours: Pink
- Chamber of Deputies: 0 / 119
- Senate: 0 / 30

Website
- phtk.ht

The Haitian Tèt Kale Party (French: Parti Haïtien Tèt Kale, Haitian Creole: Pati Ayisyen Tèt Kale, PHTK) is a Haitian political party. Tèt Kale means "Bald Headed" in Haitian Creole, and is a reference to musician and former president Michel Martelly's appearance.

== History ==
The party was formally constituted on 16 August 2012. Although then President Michel Martelly was never a member of the party, PHTK had affinities with the government, and Martelly has heavily been associated with the party, with Jovenel Moïse often characterized as his hand-picked successor.

For the 2015 presidential election, Jovenel Moïse was presented as the party's candidate. For the 2015 parliamentary elections, the party presented 11 candidates for the Senate and 99 for the Chamber of Deputies. On the first round of the legislative elections, four PHTK candidates were immediately elected. The party held 26 seats in the Chamber of Deputies and two seats in the Senate before both houses of parliament were left vacant on January 10, 2023. The party's presidential candidate Jovenel Moïse, endorsed by country president Michel Martelly, won the most votes in the first round in the 2015 presidential election and won the November 2016 Haitian presidential election after the previous election was annulled. In the early morning hours of July 7, 2021, Moïse was assassinated during an attack on his home.

== Criticism ==
According to a Haitian Sentinel article, many Haitian Americans living in Miami criticized the party as "thieves". Presidents Michel Martelly and Jovenel Moïse also received significant opposition and criticism during their presidencies due to corruption and closeness with prominent Haitian gangs.

== See also ==
- List of major liberal parties considered right
