= Provisional Electoral Council =

Electoral commission of Haiti

Conseil Électoral Provisoire
- Konsèy Elektoral Pwovizwa
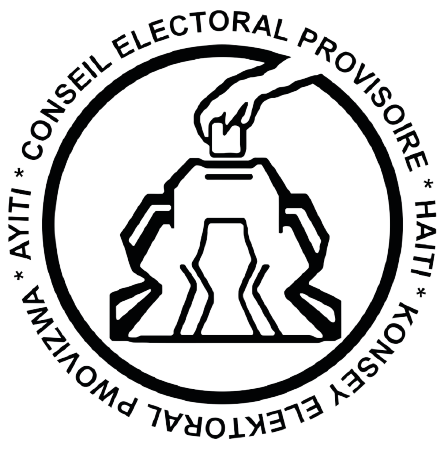

Agency overview
- Formed: 1987
- Jurisdiction: Constitution of Haiti
- Headquarters: Port-au-Prince, Haiti
- Employees: At least 9
- Agency executive: Jacques Desrosiers, President
- Website: www.cephaiti.ht

The Provisional Electoral Council (French: Conseil Électoral Provisoire, French pronunciation: [kɔ̃sɛj əlɛktɔʁal pʁɔvizwaʁ], CEP; Haitian Creole: Konsèy Elektoral Pwovizwa) is the electoral commission of Haiti. The CEP is responsible for presidential elections and parliamentary elections, and is Haiti's main and only legal election agency. Despite its ostensibly provisional nature, it has existed since 1987.

It was dissolved in September 2021 by acting Prime Minister Ariel Henry. In September 2024, the Transitional Presidential Council reestablished the CEP in preparation for the next Haitian general election in 2026.

== Mandate ==
As the sole legal electoral body in Haiti, CEP's responsibilities include the following:

- Ensuring confidence building among key actors involved in the electoral process;
- Establish the balance between the various political players in the race, hence the role of arbiter.
- Organize and supervise elections.
- Enforce the election legislation throughout the national territory.
- Ensure elections are held freely, credibly and transparently.
- Intervening in the mobilization and coordination of activities related to electoral information.
- Provide input in developing the legal framework for the electoral process.

== Criticism ==
More than 30 presidential candidates reproached CEP for its obscure scrutiny policies and censured CEP for its lack of transparency. According to Haitian Sentinel, CEP rejected transparency request by some presidential candidates including Jude Célestin, runoff candidate for the 2015 election.

== See also ==
- Elections in Haiti
- 2006 Haitian general election
- 2010–11 Haitian general election
- 2015–16 Haitian parliamentary election
- 2015 Haitian presidential election
- List of political parties in Haiti
- Politics of Haiti
