= 2020 in Haiti =

- Decades: 2000s; 2010s; 2020s
- See also: Other events of 2020; Timeline of Haitian history

Events in the year 2020 in Haiti.

== Incumbents ==
- President: Jovenel Moïse
- Prime Minister: Fritz-William Michel (acting)

== Events ==
=== February ===
- February 13 – Fifteen children die in a fire in an orphanage in Kenscoff, Port-au-Prince Arrondissement, Ouest Department.
- February 23 – Police in Port-au-Prince violently protest against money being spent on a carnaval celebrations instead of their salaries.

=== April ===
- April 6 – Haiti has community transmission of the coronavirus.
- April 9 – Many Haitians flee the Dominican Republic due to concerns about the COVID-19 pandemic in the Dominican Republic.
- April 13 – A historical landmark church inside Haiti's UNESCO World Heritage site, Our Lady of the Immaculate Conception Church in Milot, is destroyed in a fire.
- April 20 – Haiti reopens factories; the country reports 40 COVID-19 cases and three deaths.
- April 21 – Haiti and Mexico have detected coronavirus infections among migrants deported recently from the United States.

=== May ===
- May 8 – The United Nations Economic and Social Council (ECOSOC) Ad Hoc Advisory Group on Haiti calls for immediate action to address health and humanitarian needs, alongside ongoing efforts to promote sustainable development and resilience to future shocks. The organization warns that the COVID-19 pandemic may increase poverty in a country where four million people need urgent food assistance, and at least one million are suffering from severe hunger. Haiti has 101 confirmed cases of COVID-19 and 12 deaths, and it still suffers from the 2010s Haiti cholera outbreak.

=== June ===
- June 16 – COVID-19 pandemic: The government says the virus has peaked in Haiti. 4,309 people have been infected and 73 have died since March 19 when the virus was first detected.

=== July ===
- July 13 – COVID-19 pandemic: A report by The New York Times and the Marshall Project indicates that U.S. Immigration and Customs Enforcement (ICE) worsened the spread of the pandemic by deporting sick people to their countries of origin, including Haiti.

=== August ===
- August 23 – A ten-year-old girl is killed in Haiti by Hurricane Laura.
- August 26 – The number of deaths from Hurricane Laura increases to 21.

=== October ===
October 17 – 214th anniversary of the Death of Jean-Jacques Dessalines (Public holiday)

=== November ===
- November 1 – All Saints Day (Public and Roman Catholic holiday)
- November 1 and 2 – Fet Gede (Voodoo holiday)
- November 2 All Souls' Day (Public Roman Catholic holiday)
- November 13 – Haiti faces a fuel shortage in dispute between the government and its latest supplier of fuel, Preble-Rish.
- November 18 – 217th anniversary of the Battle of Vertières (Public holiday)

=== December ===
- December 10 – Jacques Yves Sebastien Duroseau, 34, a U.S. Marine, is found guilty of smuggling guns from North Carolina to Haiti in 2019 in an attempt to establish himself as Haitian president.
- December 16 – COVID-19 pandemic: Scientists are flummoxed by Haiti's relatively low number (9,588 confirmed cases) of COVID-19 infections. A feared second wave seems to be fueled by immigration from Florida and the Dominican Republic.

== Deaths ==
- January 14 – Bernard Diederich, journalist, author and historian (b. 1926).
- January 24 – Georges Castera, poet and writer (b. 1936).
- April 17 – Annette Auguste, folk singer and activist (b. 1940 or 1941).
- August 14 – Ernst Jean-Joseph, football player and manager (b. 1948).
- August 28 – Stanley Gaston, lawyer.

== See also ==
- 2020 in the Caribbean
- 2020 in politics and government
- 2020s
- Atlantic hurricane season
- COVID-19 pandemic in Haiti
- COVID-19 pandemic on cruise ships
- Haiti at the 2020 Winter Youth Olympics
