= 2021 in Haiti =

- Decades: 2000s; 2010s; 2020s
- See also: Other events of 2021; Timeline of Haitian history

Events in the year 2021 in Haiti.

== Incumbents ==
- President:
  - until 7 July: Jovenel Moise
  - 7 July-20 July: Claude Joseph (acting)
  - starting 20 July: Ariel Henry (acting)
- Prime Minister:
  - until 14 April: Joseph Jouthe
  - 14 April-20 July: Claude Joseph (acting)
  - starting 20 July: Ariel Henry (acting)

== Events ==
Ongoing – COVID-19 pandemic in Haiti

=== January to March ===
- January 14 – Hundreds demonstrate in Port-au-Prince, Cap-Haïtien, Jacmel, Saint-Marc, and Gonaïves against President Jovenel Moïse. Most of the demonstrations are peaceful, but some violence is reported.
- February 1 – President Jovenel Moïse says he will stay on until February 22 and urges people to support proposed Constitutional amendments. Opposition leaders step up demands he step down and a transportation strike cripples the country.
- February 7 – Justice Minister Rockefeller Vincent say that a planned assassination of Moïse and an attempted coup d'état were frustrated. Twenty-three are arrested.
- February 8 – Judge Joseph Mécène Jean-Louis, 72, is named to lead the opposition to Moïse.
- February 10 – Police use tear gas and shoot into the air to disperse a rock-throwing crowd of protesters. Twenty-three people are arrested and two journalists are injured during the incident. Protesters shout, "We are back to dictatorship! Down with Moise! Down with Sison," a reference to the U.S. Ambassador, Michele J. Sison, who supports Moïse.
- February 25 – At least 25 dead and many injured during a prison break at Croix-des-Bouquets Civil Prison, during which notorious gang leader Arnel Joseph escaped. Joseph is later found and killed in L'Estère.
- February 28 – Thousands wave tree branches and flags in protests against kidnappings and Moïse.
- March 2 – Haitian-born former U.S. marine Jacques Duroseau is sentenced to five years of prison for smuggling guns to Haiti in 2019.
- March 5 – Lissner Mathieu ("Ti-Nwa"), a U.S. national, and Peterson Benjamin ("Ti Peter Vilaj"), a Haitian national, are extradited to the United States. Mathieu, 55, is accused on drug charges, and Benjamin, a leader of the Village de Dieu gang, faces kidnapping charges.
- March 24 – The Supreme Court orders the release of those accused of plotting a coup d'état.
- March 28 – Thousands take to the streets in Port-au-Prince and other cities to reject a proposed referendum to introduce a new constitution.

=== April to June ===
- April 2 – Fighting in Bel Air leads to the burning of houses and at least three deaths. Jimmy "Barbecue" Chérizier, pro-government leader of the ″G-9 and Family and Allies coalition″ accepts responsibility for the attacks.
- June 8 – Haiti advances to the second round in FIFA World Cup qualifying by defeating Nicaragua (2-1) at Port-au-Prince.

=== July to September ===
- July 7 – Assassination of Jovenel Moïse
- August 14 - 2021 Haiti earthquake kills 2,248 people.

=== October to December ===
- November 12 - Amid escalating turmoil, protests over fuel price hike and gang violence, the US and Canada urge their citizens to leave Haiti.
- December 6 - Three of 17 missionaries who were kidnapped by a street gang in October are released.
- December 14 - Cap-Haïtien fuel tanker explosion
- December 16 - The remaining missionaries who were kidnapped by a street gang in October are released.

== Scheduled events ==
=== Elections ===
- TBA – 2021 Haitian parliamentary election

=== Holidays ===
- January 1 – New Year's Day and Independence Day, celebrating 217 years since the signing of the Haitian Declaration of Independence.
- January 2 – Ancestry Day, honors those who fought for independence.
- February 16 – Haitian Carnival and Mardi Gras.
- October 17 – Dessalines Day, commemorating 215 years since the death of Haiti's first leader.
- November 1–2 — All Saints' Day and All Souls' Day are celebrated in both the Christian and Haitian Vodou religion.

== Sports ==
- July – 2020–21 Ligue Haïtienne, season ends.

== Deaths ==
- 4 February – Pierre-Antoine Paulo, 76, Roman Catholic prelate, Coadjutor Bishop (2001–2008) and Bishop (2008–2020) of Port-de-Paix.
- 7 July – Jovenel Moïse, 53, President of Haiti (2017–2021)

== See also ==
- 2021 in the Caribbean
- 2020s
- 2021 Atlantic hurricane season
