= 2019 in Haiti =

- Decades: 2000s; 2010s; 2020s
- See also: Other events of 2020; Timeline of Haitian history

Events in the year 2019 in Haiti.

== Incumbents ==
- President: Jovenel Moïse
- Prime Minister:
  - Jean-Michel Lapin (Resigned February 14, remained until March 4)
  - Fritz William Michel (Appointed July 22, although not confirmed)
  - Joseph Jouthe (Officially appointed March 4)

== Events ==
- January 16: At least 21 people are killed in a massacre by gunmen in police uniforms in Port-au-Prince.
- February 7: The start of the 2019 Haitian protests.
- February 12: All 78 inmates escape from a prison in Aquin, amid ongoing unrest in the country that has left four people dead.
- February 14: 2019 Haitian protests: The death toll rises to 9 as protesters ask for Jovenel Moïse to step down as president of Haiti.
- July 22: Haitian Prime Minister Jean-Michel Lapin, who was appointed 4 months prior, resigns amidst renewed protests. President Jovenel Moïse appoints Fritz-William Michel as the new Prime Minister.
- September 23: In Port-au-Prince, an Associated Press photojournalist and a security guard are wounded when Senator Jean Marie Ralph Féthière (PHTK) opens fire, reportedly trying to pass through a demonstration outside the Haitian Parliament. The Senate tries to convene and appoint Fritz-William Michel as Prime Minister.

== Deaths ==
- 2 January: Marie Michele Rey, 80, politician.
- 27 February: Janine Tavernier, 83, poet and novelist.
- 3 June: Guy François, 71, footballer (Violette, national team)
- 25 November: Charlot Jeudy, 34, LGBT activist.
- 16 December: Mama Cax, 30, Haitian-American model

== See also ==
- 2019 in the Caribbean
- 2019 in politics and government
- 2010s
- Atlantic hurricane season
