= 2027 in Haiti =

- Decades: 2000s; 2010s; 2020s
- See also: Other events of 2027; Timeline of Haitian history

Events in the year 2027 in Haiti.

== Incumbents ==
- President: vacant since 7 February 2026
- Prime Minister: Alix Didier Fils-Aimé

== Events ==
=== Scheduled ===
- 18 July – 2027 Haitian general election
- 23 July – 8 August – Haiti at the 2027 Pan American Games

== Holidays ==
- 1 January – New Year's Day
- 2 January – Founders Day
- 8 February – Carnival
- 10 February – Ash Wednesday
- 26 March – Good Friday
- 1 May – Labour and Agriculture Day
- 6 May – Ascension Day
- 18 May – Flag Day and Universities Day
- 27 May – Corpus Christi
- 15 August – Assumption of Mary
- 17 October – Dessalines Day
- 1 November – All Saints' Day
- 2 November – All Souls' Day
- 18 November – Battle of Vertières Day
- 5 December – Discovery Day
- 25 December – Christmas Day

== See also ==
- 2020s
- 2027 Atlantic hurricane season
- 2027 in the Caribbean
