= 2017 in Haiti =

- Decades: 1990s; 2000s; 2010s; 2020s
- See also: Other events of 2017; Timeline of Haitian history

Events in the year 2017 in Haiti.

== Incumbents ==
- President: Jocelerme Privert (provisional; until 7 February) Jovenel Moïse (from 7 February)
- Prime Minister: Enex Jean-Charles (until 21 March), Jack Guy Lafontant (from 21 March)

== Events ==
- 20 January – second round of the Haitian Senate election, 2016–17
- 7 February – Jovenel Moïse assumed the position as president.

== Deaths ==
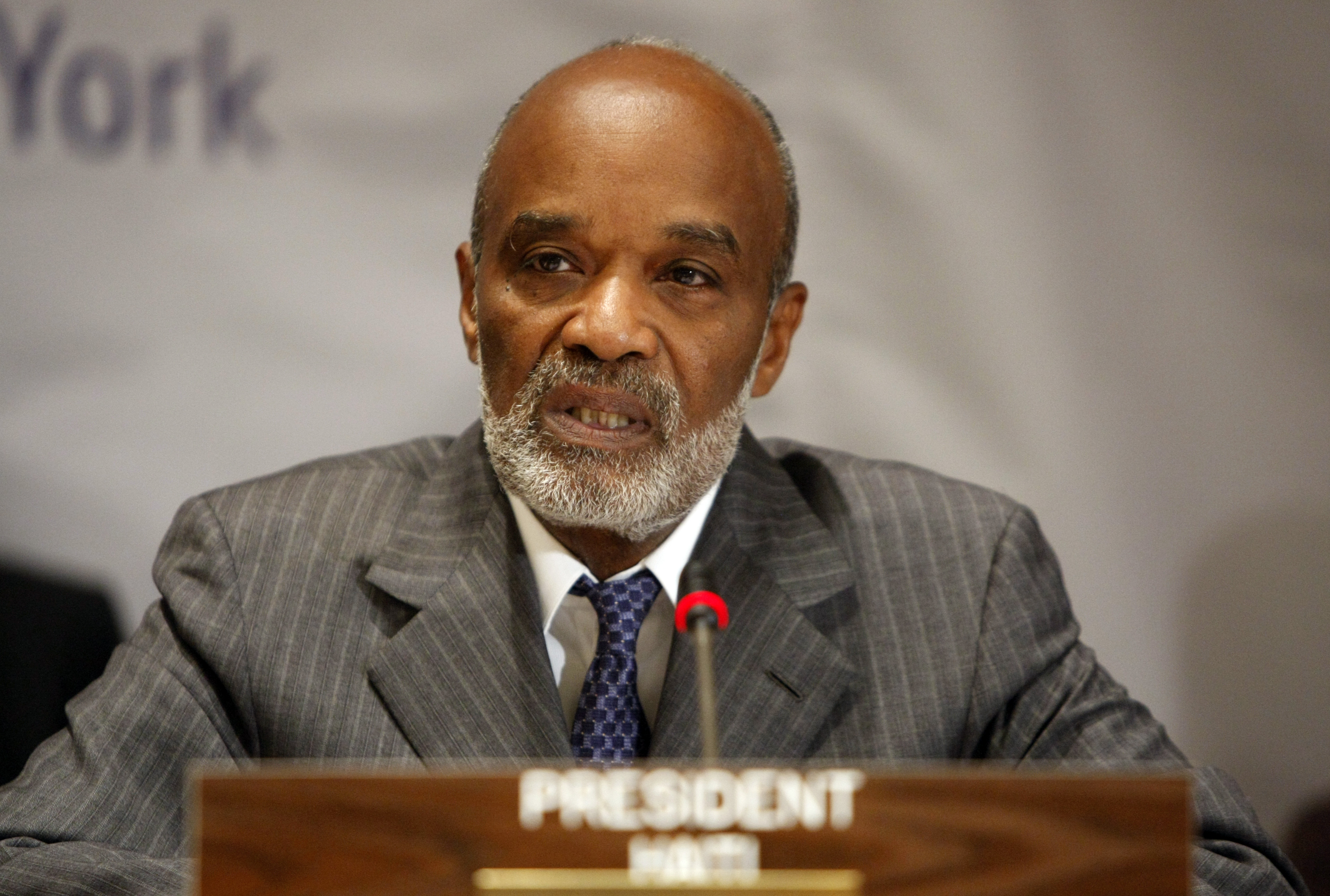
René Préval served as president of Haiti 1996–2001 and 2006–2011.

- 3 March – René Préval, politician, former president (b. 1943).
- 1 June – Viviane Gauthier, dancer (b. 1918)
