= 2021 in the Caribbean =

The following lists events that happened during 2021 in the Caribbean.

== Sovereign states ==
=== Cuba ===
(Cuba)

- First Secretary of the Central Committee of the Communist Party of Cuba: Raúl Castro (since 2011), Miguel Díaz-Canel (since 19 April 2021)
- President of Cuba: Miguel Díaz-Canel (since 2019)
  - Vice-president: Salvador Valdés Mesa (since 2019)
- Prime Minister: Manuel Marrero Cruz (since 2019)

=== Dominica ===
(Dominica)

- President: Charles Savarin (2013–2023)
- Prime Minister: Roosevelt Skerrit (since August 8, 2004)

=== Dominican Republic ===
(Dominican Republic)

- President of the Dominican Republic: Luis Abinader (starting 2020)
- Vice-president Raquel Peña de Antuña (starting 2020)

=== Haiti ===
(Haiti)

- President of Haiti:
  - Jovenel Moïse (2017–2021)
  - Ariel Henry (2021–2024)
- Acting Prime Minister:
  - Fritz-William Michel (2019–2021)
  - Claude Joseph (acting) (2021)
  - Ariel Henry (2021–2024)

=== Trinidad and Tobago ===
(Trinidad and Tobago)

- President of Trinidad and Tobago: Paula-Mae Weekes (since 2008)
- Prime minister of Trinidad and Tobago: Keith Rowley (since 2015)

== Commonwealth Realms ==
(United Kingdom) Monarch: Queen Elizabeth II (since 1952)

=== Antigua and Barbuda ===
(Antigua and Barbuda)

- Governor-General of Antigua and Barbuda: Rodney Williams (since 2014)
- Prime Minister: Gaston Browne (since 2014)

=== The Bahamas ===
The Bahamas are in the Atlantic Ocean and are part of the West Indies, not part of the Caribbean, although the United Nations groups them with the Caribbean

=== Barbados ===
Barbados became independent from the United Kingdom in 1966

- Governor-General of Barbados: Sandra Mason (since 2018)
- President of Barbados: Sandra Mason (from November 30, 2021)
- Prime minister of Barbados: Mia Mottley (since 2018)

=== Grenada ===
(Grenada)

- Governor-General of Grenada: Cécile La Grenade (since 2013)
- Prime Minister: Keith Mitchell (since 2013)

=== Jamaica ===
Jamaica became independent in 1962

- Governor-General of Jamaica: Patrick Allen (since 2009)
- Prime Minister of Jamaica: Andrew Holness (since 2016)

=== Saint Kitts and Nevis ===
(Saint Kitts and Nevis)

- Governor-General of Saint Kitts and Nevis: Tapley Seaton (since 2015)
- Prime Minister: Timothy Harris (since 2018)
  - Deputy Prime Minister: Shawn Richards (since 2015)

=== Saint Lucia ===
(Saint Lucia)

- Governor-General of Saint Lucia: Neville Cenac (2018 - July 28, 2021)
- Prime Minister: Allen Chastanet (2016 - July 27, 2021)
- Prime Minister: Phillip J. Pierre (July 28, 2021 – present)

=== Saint Vincent and the Grenadines ===
(Saint Vincent and the Grenadines)

- Governor-General of Saint Vincent and the Grenadines: Susan Dougan (since 2019)
- Prime Minister: Ralph Gonsalves (since March 28, 2001)

== Dependencies ==
=== British overseas territories ===
(United Kingdom) Head of the Commonwealth: Queen Elizabeth II

==== Anguilla ====
(Anguilla)

- Governor of Anguilla: Tim Foy (since 2017)
  - Deputy Governor: Perin A. Bradley
- Premier of Anguilla: Ellis Webster (since 2020)

==== Bermuda ====
Bermuda is located in the Atlantic Ocean and is included in the UN geoscheme for North America

- Governor of Bermuda: John Rankin (since 2016)
- Premier: Edward David Burt (since 2017)

==== British Virgin Islands ====
(British Virgin Islands)

- Governor of the Virgin Islands: Augustus Jaspert (since 2017)
  - Deputy Governor of the British Virgin Islands: David Archer
- Premier: Andrew Fahie (since 2019)

==== Cayman Islands ====
(Cayman Islands)

- Governor of the Cayman Islands: Martyn Roper (since 2018)
- Premier: Alden McLaughlin (since 2013)

==== Montserrat ====
(Montserrat)

- Governor of Montserrat: Andrew Pearce (since 2018)
- Premier: Easton Taylor-Farrell (since 2019)

==== Turks and Caicos Islands ====
Turks and Caicos Islands are located in the Atlantic Ocean, although the United Nations groups them with the Caribbean

- Governor Nigel Dakin (since 2019)
- Premier:
  - Sharlene Cartwright-Robinson (until February 20)
  - Washington Misick (starting February 20)

=== France ===
(France)

- President: Emmanuel Macron (since 2017)
- Prime Minister: Édouard Philippe (since 2017)

==== Guadeloupe ====
- Governor: Philippe Gustin (since 2018)

==== Martinique ====
- President of the Assembly of Martinique:Claude Lise (since 2015)

==== Saint Barthélemy ====
- President of Territorial Council: Bruno Magras (since July 16, 2007)

==== Saint Martin ====
- Prefect Anne Laubies (since 2015)
- President of Territorial Council Daniel Gibbs (since 2017)
  - First Vice President Valerie Damaseua (since 2017)

=== Kingdom of the Netherlands ===
(Netherlands) Monarch: King Willem-Alexander (since April 30, 2013)

==== Aruba ====
(Aruba)

- Governor of Aruba: Alfonso Boekhoudt (since 2017)
- Prime Minister: Evelyn Wever-Croes (since 2018)

==== Curaçao ====
(Curaçao)

- Governor of Curaçao: Lucille George-Wout (since 2013)
- Prime Minister: Eugene Rhuggenaath

==== Sint Maarten ====
Sint Maarten became a self-governing constituent Kingdom of the Netherlands in October 2010.

- Governor of Sint Maarten: Eugene Holiday (since 2010)
- Interim Prime minister of Sint Maarten: Silveria Jacobs (since 2020)

==== Caribbean Netherlands ====
Bonaire, Sint Eustatius, and (Saba (island)) Saba

=== United States ===
The (United States)

- President
  - Donald Trump (until January 20)
  - Joe Biden (starting January 20)
- Vice-president
  - Mike Pence (until January 20)
  - Kamala Harris (starting January 20)

==== Puerto Rico ====
(Puerto Rico)

- Governor of Puerto Rico
  - Wanda Vázquez Garced (until January 2)
  - Pedro Pierluisi (starting January 2)
- Resident Commissioner of Puerto Rico: Jenniffer González (since 2017)

==== United States Virgin Islands ====
(United States Virgin Islands)

- Governor: Albert Bryan (since 2019)
  - Lt. Governor: Tregenza Roach (since 2019)

== Events ==
=== January and February ===
- January 3 – The alert level on Saint Vincent is raised to orange for La Soufrière volcano.
- January 6 – Stacey Plaskett (D), Delegate to the U.S. House of Representatives from the Virgin Islands, said she sheltered in her office during the storming of the United States Capitol and avoided contact with Republican colleagues who refused to wear face masks.
- January 8 – COVID-19 pandemic: Caymen Islands, Puerto Rico, Turks and Caicos, Guadeloupe, Martinique, and Aruba get vaccines, but larger, independent countries do not.
- January 18 – The U.S. Immigration and Customs Enforcement (ICE) plans to deport a Paul Pierrilus, 40, to Haiti on January 19. Pierrilus was born in Saint Martin to Haitian parents and has lived in the United States since he was five; technically he is a stateless person since he is a citizen of none. Congressman Mondaire Jones (D-NY) stopped the deportation at the last minute. 218,000 other stateless people live in the United States.
- January 28 – A Venezuelan-flagged fishing boat is captured with 4.2 tons of cocaine in international waters east of Barbados.
- January 29 – 647 Haitian nationals, 23 Cubans, and 19 migrants from African countries are stranded on a beach in Antioquia Department, Colombia, hoping to pass through the Darién Gap to Panama and the United States.
- February 7 – Haitian Justice Minister Rockefeller Vincent says that a planned assassination of President Jovenel Moïse and an attempted coup d'état were frustrated. Twenty-three are arrested.
- February 8 – Kristalina Georgieva of the International Monetary Fund (IMF) predicts that Latin American and Caribbean economic activity will not return to pre-pandemic levels of output until 2023 and GDP per capita will catch up only in 2025.
- February 9 – Delegate Stacey Plaskett (D) of the Virgin Islands makes history as the first non-voting member of the United States House of Representatives to serve as an impeachment manager.
- February 19
  - The Group of Seven (G-7) promises an equitable distribution of COVID-19 vaccines, although few details have been provided.
  - Agricultural workers in Martinique and Guadeloupe get a court hearing on a pesticide banned in France but used on the islands. The case was brought in 2006.
- February 22 – The USCGC Thetis seizes 6,000 pounds of cocaine from three ships in 43 days.
- February 25 – The Cayman Islands is one of four countries added to the Financial Action Task Force (FATF) list of places that are only partially in compliance with international efforts against financing terrorism and money laundering.

=== March to June ===
- March 1 – While COVID-19 infections are slowing worldwide, Caribbean states, including Jamaica, Cuba, Barbados, St. Lucia, and St. Vincent and the Grenadines are seeing a surge. Vaccine rollout has been slow
- March 2 – A boat with partially decomposed bodies of six migrants, one with a passport from Guinea, is found Cayo Las Palomas, Nicaragua.
- June 10 – Two passengers on cruise ship test positive for COVID-19. They will stay in Sint Maarten until they test negative.

== Scheduled and programmed events ==
=== Elections ===
- January 25 – 2021 Tobago House of Assembly election
- February – 2021 Jamaican local elections
- March 19 – 2021 Curaçao general election
- March – 2021 Barbuda Council
- May 26 – 2021 Caymanian general election
- June – 2021 Saint Lucian general election
- September – 2021 Aruban general election
- 2021 Turks and Caicos Islands general election
- 2021 Bahamian local elections
- Haitian parliamentary election

=== Holidays ===
==== January and February ====
- January 1 –New Year's Day
  - Triumph of the Revolution, Cuba
  - Independence Day, Haiti (from France, 1804)
- January 2
  - Victory Day, Cuba
  - Ancestry Day, Haiti
  - Day after New Year's, Saint Lucia
- January 6 – Epiphany, Christian and children's holiday
- January 11 – Majority Rule Day, the Bahamas
- January 18 – Martin Luther King Jr. Day, official holiday in Puerto Rico and United States Virgin Islands
- January 21
  - Errol Barrow Day, Barbados
  - Our Lady of High Grace, holiday in the Dominican Republic
- January 25 – Juan Pablo Duarte′s Birthday, Dominican Republic
- February 8 – Independence Day (Grenada) (from the UK, 1974)
- February 15 – Heroes′ Day, Puerto Rico; President's Day, Puerto Rico and U.S. Virgin Islands
- February 15–16 — Carnival Monday and Tuesday.
- February 22 – Independence Day, Saint Lucia (from the UK, 1979)
- February 27 – Independence Day, Dominican Republic (from Haiti, 1844)

==== March and April ====
- March 2 – American Citizenship Day, Puerto Rico
- March 15 – Joseph Chatoyer Day, Saint Vincent and the Grenadines
- March 22 – Emancipation Day, Puerto Rico
- March 31 – Transfer Day, U.S. Virgin Islands.
- April 2 – Good Friday, Christian feast celebrated in Cuba, Dominica,
- April 5 – Easter Monday, Christian holiday celebrated in Dominica,
- April 28 – Barbadian National Heroes Day, Barbados

==== May and June ====
- May 1/3 – Labour Day and International Workers' Day
  - Labour and Agriculture Day, Haiti
- May 18 – Flag and Universities Day, Haiti
- May 20 – Independence Day (from the United States, 1902), celebrated by Cuban exiles.
- May 24
  - Whit Monday, Christian holiday celebrated in Dominica,
  - Labour Day (Jamaica)
- May 31 – Memorial Day, Puerto Rico and U.S. Virgin Islands
- June 3 – Feast of Corpus Christi, celebrated in Dominican Republic, public holiday in Grenada, Haiti Saint Lucia,
- June 4 – Randol Fawkes-Labour Day, the Bahamas

==== July and August ====
- July 3 – Emancipation Day, U.S. Virgin Islands
- July 4 – Independence of the United States, celebrated in Puerto Rico and U.S. Virgin Islands
- July 5–6 – Vincy Mas (Carnival), Saint Vincent and the Grenadines
- July 10 – Independence Day, the Bahamas (from the UK, 1973)
- July 14 – Bastille Day, celebrated in French territories.
- July 25–27 – Commemoration of the Assault on the Moncada Barracks, Cuba
- August 2
  - Emancipation Day, Dominica, the Bahamas, Grenada, Jamaica, Saint Vincent and the Grenadines
  - Kadooment Day, Barbados
- August 3
  - Emancipation Day, Barbados
  - Culturama Day, Saint Kitts and Nevis
- August 6 – Independence Day (Jamaica) (from the UK, 1962)
- August 15 – Assumption of Mary, Roman Catholic feast celebrated in Haiti
- August 16 – Restoration Day, Dominican Republic

==== September and October ====
- September 6 – Labor Day, Puerto Rico and U.S. Virgin Islands
- September 16 – Heroes' Day, Saint Kitts and Nevis
- September 20 – Independence Day, Saint Kitts and Nevis (from the UK, 1973)
- September 24 – Feast of María de las Mercedes (English: Our Lady of Mercy), celebrated in Dominican Republic
- October 4 – Thanksgiving Day, Saint Lucia
- October 10 – Independence Day (from Spain, 1868), Cuba
- October 11
  - National Heroes' Day, the Bahamas,
  - Columbus Day, Puerto Rico and U.S. Virgin Islands
- October 17 – Jean-Jacques Dessalines Day, Haiti
- October 18 – Heroes' Day, Jamaica
- October 25 – Thanksgiving Day, Grenada
- October 27 – Independence Day, Saint Vincent and the Grenadines (from the UK, 1979)

==== November and December ====
- November 1
  - Independence Day, Antigua and Barbuda (from the UK, 1981)
  - D. Hamilton Jackson Day, U.S. Virgin Islands
- All Saints' Day, Roman Catholic and Vodou holiday in Haiti
- All Souls' Day, Roman Catholic and Vodou holiday in Haiti
- November 3 – Independence Day, Dominica (from the UK, 1978)
- November 4 – National Day of Community Service, Dominica
- November 5 – Constitution Day, Dominican Republic
- November 11 – Veterans Day, Puerto Rico and U.S. Virgin Islands
- November 18 – Battle of Vertières Day, Haiti
- November 19 – Discovery Day, Puerto Rico
- November 25 – Thanksgiving (United States), celebrated in Puerto Rico and U.S. Virgin Islands
- November 30 – Republic Day, Barbados
- December 9 – V.C. Bird Day, Antigua and Barbuda
- December 13 – National Day, Saint Lucia (feast of Saint Lucy)
- December 25/26/27 – Christmas Day
- December 26/27/28 – Boxing Day, celebrated in the Commonwealth and British Dependencies.

== Deaths ==
=== January to March ===
- January 5 – Gordon "Butch" Stewart, 79, Jamaican businessman (Sandals Resorts)
- January 9 – Vivalyn Latty-Scott, 82, West Indies cricketer (Jamaica national team, West Indies national team) and coach.
- January 17 – Carlo Nayaradou, 63, French-Martinican comic book author.
- February 6 – Ezra Moseley, 63, Barbadian cricketer (Glamorgan, West Indies cricket team, national team); traffic collision.
- March 2 – Bunny Wailer, 73, Jamaican reggae singer-songwriter and percussionist (The Wailers); complications from a stroke.

=== April to June ===
- April 10 – Marcio Veloz Maggiolo, 84, Dominican writer, archaeologist and anthropologist, complications from COVID-19.

== See also ==
- 2020s
- 2021 in politics and government
- 2020s in political history
- 2021 Atlantic hurricane season
- Caribbean Community
- List of state leaders in the Caribbean in 2021
- Organization of American States
