= Bocchit Edmond =

Haitian politician and diplomat

Ambassador of Haiti to the United States
- In office December 1, 2020 – January 20, 2025
- Preceded by: Hervé Denis

Foreign Minister of Haiti
- In office September 5, 2018 – March 4, 2020
- Prime Minister: Jack Guy Lafontant; Jean-Henry Céant; Jean-Michel Lapin; Joseph Jouthe
- Preceded by: Antonio Rodrigue
- Succeeded by: Claude Joseph

Bocchit Edmond is a Haitian politician and diplomat. He has been the Ambassador of Haiti to the United States since December 1, 2020 until January 20, 2025, when he replaced Hervé Denis, the prior ambassador. In 2022 he called for military intervention from the international community to stem unrest and violence.

Previously, Edmond served as Haiti's Minister of Foreign Affairs from September 2018 until March 2020, when he was succeeded by Claude Joseph. In May 2023, Haitian government fired Bocchit due to a corruption scheme involving illegal passport issuance at his Washington embassy, according to The Miami Herald.
