= 2026 in Haiti =

- Decades: 2000s; 2010s; 2020s
- See also: Other events of 2026; Timeline of Haitian history

Events in the year 2026 in Haiti.

== Incumbents ==
- President: Transitional Presidential Council (until 7 February), vacant since 7 February
- Prime Minister: Alix Didier Fils-Aimé

== Events ==
=== January ===
- 22 January – The Transitional Presidential Council dismisses Alix Didier Fils-Aimé as Prime Minister.

=== February ===
- 2 February – The decapitated bodies of four Haitian women are found near the southern section of the Dominican Republic–Haiti border.
- 5 February – An Embraer EMB-110P1 Bandeirante operated by Agape Flights crashes near Jérémie while on a flight to Les Cayes.
- 6–22 February – Haiti at the 2026 Winter Olympics
- 7 February – The Transitional Presidential Council steps down, leaving prime minister Alix Didier Fils-Aimé in sole charge of the government.

=== March ===
- 2 March – The United States Federal Aviation Administration extends a ban on commercial flights to Port-au-Prince until 3 September due to gang violence.
- 13 March – Journalists Junior Célestin of Radio Television Megastar and Osnel Espérance of Radio Uni FM are abducted by suspected gangs while reporting in Port-au-Prince.
- 15 March – Fugitive MP Arnel Belizaire is arrested on charges of financing terrorism and conspiracy against state security.
- 29 March – At least 16 people are killed and 10 others are injured by the Gran Grif gang in Petite-Rivière-de-l'Artibonite, during a gun fight with a vigilante group. Human rights activists allege that more than 30 people were killed and dozens were missing.

=== April ===
- 11 April – Citadelle Laferrière crowd crush – At least 30 people are killed and dozens more are injured after a bottleneck crowd crush near the entrance of the historic fortress of Citadelle Laferrière, Nord.
- 13 April – Seven people are killed in an attack by gangs on Marigot.
- 14 April – At least 12 people are reported killed following days of flooding caused by heavy rains in the northwest of the country.

=== May ===
- 8 May – A court in the United States convicts four people for on charges of conspiring to assassinate president Jovenel Moïse in 2021.

=== June ===
- 11 June – Gunmen abduct James Boyard, cabinet director of the Defense Ministry and concurrent inspector general of the Haitian National Police, in the Bourdon neighborhood of Port-au-Prince.
- 11 June–19 July – Haiti participates at the 2026 FIFA World Cup.

=== August ===
- 23 August – At least 47 people are killed in an attack by gangs on Kenscoff.

=== September ===
- 20 September – Haiti extradites 18 suspects to the United States to stand trial for the 2021 assassination of president Jovenel Moïse.

=== October ===
- 18 October – Four Salvadoran nationals working for the Gang Suppression Force are abducted by criminal groups in Croix-des-Bouquets.
- 21 October – El Salvador launches a military intervention in Haiti following the Croix-des-Bouquets kidnappings.

== Holidays ==
- 1 January – New Year's Day
- 2 January – Founders Day
- 17 February – Carnival
- 18 February – Ash Wednesday
- 3 April – Good Friday
- 1 May – Labour and Agriculture Day
- 29 May – Ascension Day
- 18 May – Flag Day and Universities Day
- 4 June – Corpus Christi
- 15 August – Assumption of Mary
- 17 October – Dessalines Day
- 1 November – All Saints' Day
- 2 November – All Souls' Day
- 18 November – Battle of Vertières Day
- 5 December – Discovery Day
- 25 December – Christmas Day

== Deaths ==
- 8 February – Eddy Antoine, 76, footballer (Racing Haïtien, Chicago Sting, national team).

== See also ==
- 2020s
- 2026 Atlantic hurricane season
- 2026 in the Caribbean
