= 2018 in Haiti =

- Decades: 1990s; 2000s; 2010s; 2020s
- See also: Other events of 2018; Timeline of Haitian history

Events in the year 2018 in Haiti.

== Incumbents ==
- President: Jovenel Moïse
- Prime Minister: Jack Guy Lafontant

== Events ==
- 2018 Haiti earthquake

== Deaths ==
- 6 January – Emerante Morse, dancer and folklorist (b. 1918).
- 26 June – Henri Namphy, military officer and politician (b. 1932).
