= 2022 in Haiti =

- Decades: 2000s; 2010s; 2020s
- See also: Other events of 2022; Timeline of Haitian history

Events in the year 2022 in Haiti.

== Incumbents ==
- President: Ariel Henry (acting)
- Prime Minister: Ariel Henry (acting)

== Events ==
Ongoing – COVID-19 pandemic in Haiti

- January 1 – Prime Minister Ariel Henry survives an assassination attempt when shooters opened fire at a ceremony celebrating the country's independence anniversary in a church in the city of Gonaïves.
- January 6 – Two journalists are killed and their bodies burned during a gang attack in Port-au-Prince.
- February 1 – 2022 Haiti flood: Three people are killed and at least 2,500 families have been evacuated amid heavy rains and flooding in Haiti.
- April 20 – A small plane crashes into a street in Port-au-Prince, killing six people.
- May 3 – Carlos Guillén Tatis, the agriculture counselor at the Dominican Republic's embassy in Haiti, is kidnapped in Croix-des-Bouquets.
- July 14 – At least 89 people, including 42 civilians, are killed after gang warfare over the control of the Cité Soleil neighbourhood began a week ago between the G9 and G-Pèp gangs in Port-au-Prince.
- July 16 – The Office of the United Nations High Commissioner for Human Rights documents 934 killings, 684 injuries and 680 kidnappings in Port-au-Prince since the start of 2022, in a sharp increase of violence in the city.
- July 24 – At least 17 Haitian migrants are killed and 25 others are rescued when their boat capsizes off New Providence, Bahamas.
- October 2 – Haitian authorities announce an unexpected resurgence of cholera in the country and report that at least seven people have died from the disease.
- October 9 – UN Secretary-General António Guterres proposes a "rapid action force" of several countries that could intervene in Haiti in order to help the Haitian National Police restore control of the country and remove the threat posed by "armed gangs".
- October 16 – 2018–2022 Haitian protests:
  - The United States and Canada send military equipment to Haiti, including tactical and armoured vehicles, as violence and shortages continue to worsen in the country.
  - The U.S. drafts a resolution at the United Nations Security Council to approve the deployment of a "multinational rapid action force" to Haiti, citing ongoing "instability and violence" in the country.
- October 19 – Prime Minister of the Bahamas Philip Davis says that he is ready to send troops to Haiti as part of a peacekeeping force if asked to do so by the Caribbean Community.
- November 6 – Following increased international pressure, Haitian gang leader Jimmy Chérizier announces the end of a blockade that his gang had imposed on a key fuel station.
- December 1 – Twelve people are killed as armed gangs storm the town of Cabaret, Haiti.

=== Holidays ===
- January 1 – New Year's Day and Independence Day, celebrating 217 years since the signing of the Haitian Declaration of Independence.
- January 2 – Ancestry Day, honors those who fought for independence.
- February 16 – Haitian Carnival and Mardi Gras.
- October 17 – Dessalines Day, commemorating 215 years since the death of Haiti's first leader.
- November 1–2 — All Saints' Day and All Souls' Day are celebrated in both the Christian and Haitian Vodou religion.

== Deaths ==
- 30 March – Yanick Étienne, singer (born 1957)
- 6 August – Yvon Buissereth, politician, member of the Senate
- 24 August – Hérard Abraham, military officer, acting president (1990), commander-in-chief of the armed forces (1990–1991) and twice minister of foreign affairs. (born 1940)
- 28 October – Eric Jean Baptiste, politician (born 1970)

== See also ==
- 2020s
- 2022 Atlantic hurricane season
