= Martine Moïse =

First Lady of Haiti from 2017 to 2021

- Moïse in Lima, Peru (2018)

First Lady of Haiti
- In role 7 February 2017 – 7 July 2021
- President: Jovenel Moïse
- Preceded by: Ginette Michaud Privert
- Succeeded by: Vacant

Personal details
- Born: Martine Marie Étienne Joseph; 5 June 1974 (age 52) Port-au-Prince, Haiti
- Party: Tèt Kale
- Spouse: Jovenel Moïse (m. 1996; died 2021)
- Children: 3
- Education: Quisqueya University

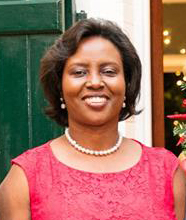
Martine Moïse in 2018

Martine Marie Étienne Moïse (née Joseph; born 5 June 1974) is the former first lady of Haiti and widow of assassinated Haitian president Jovenel Moïse. She served as the first lady from 7 February 2017 to 7 July 2021. Moïse was wounded and her husband killed in an early morning attack on their home in Pétion-Ville.

== Early life and education ==
Moïse was born Martine Marie Étienne Joseph in Port-au-Prince on 5 June 1974. She completed her elementary and high school studies at the Collège Roger Anglade before receiving a degree in interpretation studies at Quisqueya University in 1997.

== First Lady of Haiti ==
She met her future husband, Jovenel Moïse, while both were students at Quisqueya University. They were married in 1996. Later that same year, Moïse and her husband moved to Port-de-Paix, Nord-Ouest, with the intention of working in rural development.

She became Haiti's first lady after her husband won the November 2016 presidential election on February 7, 2017. During her tenure, Martine Moïse served as president of the Fondasyon Klere Ayiti, a community development organization focused on civic education and women's issues. In October 2017, she became president of coordination for Global Fund in Haiti, which aims to alleviate HIV/AIDS, malaria, and other public health diseases in Haiti. Moïse also advocated new investments in the Haitian arts and crafts industry in an effort to boost local artisans.

=== Attack ===
On 7 July 2021, President Jovenel Moïse was assassinated, while Martine Moïse was shot and seriously wounded during the attack at their residence in Pétion-Ville. Moïse suffered gunshots wounds to her arms and thigh, with other severe injuries to her hand and abdomen. Moïse was initially treated at the General Hospital of Port-au-Prince, while erroneous rumors of her death began to circulate.

Haiti's Ambassador to the United States, Bocchit Edmond, told reporters that Moïse was "in stable, but critical condition" and arrangements were being made to evacuate her to Miami for treatment.

Later the same day, Moïse was airlifted by Trinity Air Ambulance from Haiti to Fort Lauderdale Executive Airport in Florida, arriving in Fort Lauderdale at approximately 3:30 p.m. She was taken by ambulance from the airport to the Ryder Trauma Center at Jackson Memorial Hospital in Miami.

On 10 July, she posted an audio message to her Twitter account, saying her husband was killed in a well-planned attack by a group of "highly trained and heavily armed" individuals, with the assassination being so quick he couldn't say a word. She accused unnamed people of being behind the assassination of her husband, due to the issue of roads, water, electricity, and the constitutional referendum, so they could stall a democratic transition of power. She also called on Haiti not to lose its way and not let Jovenel Moïse's sacrifice go to waste.

Martine shared photos of herself lying in the hospital bed on 14 July and thanked the medical team for saving her. She added that she was still in shock over the way her husband died, and her pain over his death would never pass.

She returned to Haiti on 17 July after she was released from the hospital. Her flight landed at the Toussaint Louverture International Airport in Port-au-Prince, where she was greeted by government officials, including acting prime minister Claude Joseph. Her return was not announced in advance and left many surprised.

On 19 February 2024, Moïse was indicted for alleged complicity regarding her husband's assassination. Claude Joseph and former police chief Léon Charles were also indicted, with Charles being charged with murder. The indictment was overturned on 13 October 2025 following an appeal.

== Presidential campaign ==
On 15 November 2026, Moïse registered as a presidential candidate in the 2027 Haitian general election.
