= 2013 in Haiti =

- Decades: 1990s; 2000s; 2010s; 2020s
- See also: Other events of 2013; Timeline of Haitian history

The following lists events that happened during 2013 in the Republic of Haiti.

== Incumbents ==
- President: Michel Martelly
- Prime Minister: Laurent Lamothe

== Events ==
=== November ===
- November 26 - At least 30 Haitian migrants die when a boat capsizes off the Bahamas.

=== December ===
- December 25 - Eighteen Haitian migrants drown off the Turks and Caicos Islands after their sailboat carrying more than 50 suspected immigrants capsized while being towed into port.
