= 2004 in Haiti =

- Decades: 1980s; 1990s; 2000s; 2010s; 2020s
- See also: Other events of 2004; Timeline of Haitian history

This article is a list of events in the year 2004 in Haiti.

== Incumbents ==
- President: Jean-Bertrand Aristide (until February 29), Boniface Alexandre (from February 29)
- Prime Minister: Yvon Neptune (until March 12), Gérard Latortue (from March 12)

== Events ==
=== February ===
- February 10 - Violence in Haiti has increased and anti-government forces take several towns in western Haiti; 46 people have been killed thus far and the United Nations urged both sides to stop fighting.
- February 29 - A coup d'état takes place in Port-au-Prince, forcing President Aristide to resign and flee to the Central African Republic. 10 people have been killed in the process.

=== March ===
- March 1 - Aristide claims that his resignation was forced under duress and alleges that he was detained by the U.S. to do so.
