= 2014 in Haiti =

- Decades: 1990s; 2000s; 2010s; 2020s
- See also: Other events of 2014; Timeline of Haitian history

The following lists events that happened during 2014 in Haiti.

== Incumbents ==
- President: Michel Martelly
- Prime Minister: Laurent Lamothe (until 20 December), Florence Duperval Guillaume (acting) (starting 20 December)

== Events ==
=== May ===
- May 13 - Investigators claim to have found the wreck of Christopher Columbus's flagship, the Santa Maria, off the north coast of Haiti.

=== October ===
- October 4 - Jean-Claude Duvalier, leader of Haiti from his father's death in 1971 until his overthrow by a popular uprising in 1986, dies of a heart attack.

=== December ===
- December 14 - Laurent Lamothe resigns as Prime Minister of Haiti along with several ministers following violent protests and a commission's call for him to step down. The protesters have been demanding the holding of early elections.

== Deaths ==
=== October ===
- October 4: Jean-Claude Duvalier
