= Enex Jean-Charles =

Prime Minister of Haiti from 2016 to 2017

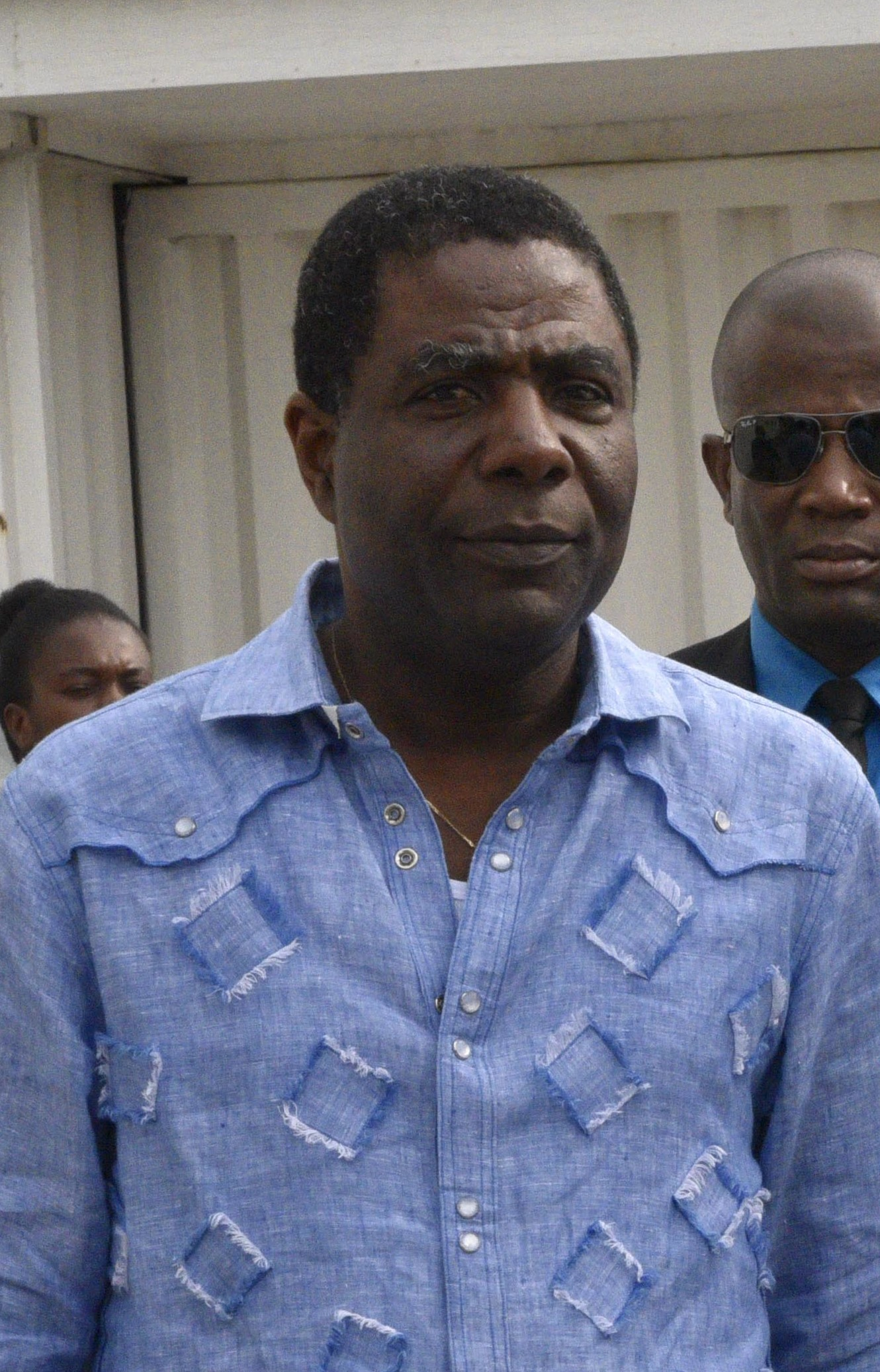
- Jean-Charles in 2016

19th Prime Minister of Haiti
- In office 28 March 2016 – 21 March 2017
- President: Jocelerme Privert (acting); Jovenel Moïse
- Preceded by: Fritz Jean
- Succeeded by: Jack Guy Lafontant

Personal details
- Born: 18 July 1960 (age 65) Chansolme, Haiti
- Party: Independent

Enex Jean-Charles (French pronunciation: [ɛnɛks ʒɑ̃ ʃaʁl], born 18 July 1960) is a Haitian politician who served as the 19th prime minister of Haiti from 2016 to 2017.

== Career ==
Jean-Charles was born on 18 July 1960 in Chansolme.

From March 2004 to June 2006 Jean-Charles served as Secretary General of the Council of Ministers under President Boniface Alexandre. Under Alexandre's successor, René Préval, Jean-Charles was a special advisor. He also served as advisor to President Michel Martelly during his term in office (2011–2016).

In March 2016 Jean-Charles was named as designate Minister of Planning and External Cooperation in the cabinet of Fritz Jean. On 22 March 2016 acting president Jocelerme Privert appointed Jean-Charles as prime minister by decree. The general policy plan of his predecessor, Fritz Jean, had been rejected by the Chamber of Deputies on 20 March. On 24 March Jean-Charles presented his cabinet. On 25 March Jean-Charles obtained support for both his general policy plan and his cabinet from both Houses of the Haitian Parliament and was confirmed as prime minister. On 28 March his government was officially installed. After having at first appointed Simon Dieuseul Desras as minister of defense ad interim, Antoine Atouriste was announced as new minister on 11 April 2016 but did not actually take office. On 26 April Jean-Charles was appointed to the position. Jean-Charles was succeeded as prime minister by Jack Guy Lafontant on 21 March 2017.

Jean-Charles has worked as a professor of administrative law at the State University of Haiti since 1991. By September 2025 he served as president Steering Committee of the National Conference that drafted a preliminary version of a new Constitution of Haiti.

== Personal life ==
Jean-Charles is married and has three children.

Political offices
| Preceded by Fritz Jean | Prime Minister of Haiti; 2016–2017 | Succeeded by Jack Guy Lafontant |
