= 2025 in Haiti =

- Decades: 2000s; 2010s; 2020s
- See also: Other events of 2025; Timeline of Haitian history

Events in the year 2025 in Haiti.

== Incumbents ==
- President: Transitional Presidential Council
- Prime Minister: Alix Didier Fils-Aimé

== Events ==
Ongoing:

- Gang war in Haiti
- Haitian crisis (2018–present)

=== January ===
- 12 January – Former MP Prophane Victor is arrested in Port-au-Prince on charges of colluding with gang members operating in Artibonite Department.
- 22 January – Colombian president Gustavo Petro arrives in Jacmel as part of his visit to Haiti.
- 27 January – Armed gangs begin an assault on Belot and Godet communities of Kenscoff, killing at least 50 people, injuring 11, and displacing 3,000 people. At least 20 gang members are reportedly killed by security forces.

=== February ===
- 4 February – A Salvadoran military contingent arrives in Haiti to assist in the UN-backed security mission there.
- 13 February – The general hospital of Port-au-Prince is set on fire.
- 23 February – A Kenyan police officer is killed in an operation against gangs in Artibonite Department.
- 25 February – An unspecified number of people are killed in an attack by gangs on the Delmas 30 neighborhood of Port-au-Prince.

=== March ===
- 2 March – Police launch a massive security operation on the Lower Delmas neighborhood of Port-au-Prince, killing multiple gang members.
- 25 March – A Kenyan police officer is killed in an ambush by gangs in Pont-Sondé.
- 31 March – Around 530 inmates escape the local prison following an attack by gangs on Mirebalais.

=== April ===
- 20 April – Three soldiers are killed in an ambush by gangs in Kenscoff.
- 23 April – Two soldiers and four civilians are killed in attacks by gangs in Kenscoff. Two other soldiers and at least 35 members of the Viv Ansanm gang are killed during another attack in Pacot, Port-au-Prince.
- 24 April – Four people are killed and 15 are injured in attacks by the Gran Grif gang in Petite Rivière de l'Artibonite.

=== May ===
- 2 May – The United States designates the Viv Ansanm and Gran Grif gangs as foreign terrorist organizations.
- 16 May – A jury in the United States convicts Germine Joly, leader of the 400 Mawozo gang, of kidnapping 16 Americans in Haiti in 2021.

=== June ===
- 4 June – US President Donald Trump issues a proclamation barring Haitian nationals from entering the United States.
- 12 June – Toussaint Louverture International Airport in Port-au-Prince reopens following a seven-month closure due to gang violence in November 2024.
- 20 June – Jean Morose Viliena, the former mayor of Les Irois, is sentenced to nine years' imprisonment by a court in the United States for lying about committing atrocities in office during his US visa application.

=== July ===
- 6 July – The historic Hotel Oloffson in Port-au-Prince is destroyed in an arson attack by armed gangs.
- 15 July – Three suspects are killed in a shootout with police following a raid on a boat near Tortuga that results in the seizure of 1,000 kilograms of cocaine.
- 17 July – Businessman and former presidential candidate Reginald Boulos is arrested in the United States on charges of involvement with the Viv Ansanm gang.
- 18 July – Colombian president Gustavo Petro arrives in Port-au-Prince for his second visit to Haiti, in which he announces the opening of a Colombian embassy in the country.
- 23 July – Five people, including three police officers, are killed in a gang attack in Artibonite Department.

=== August ===
- 2 August – Former senator Nenel Cassy is arrested in Petionville on charges of conspiring against the state and financing criminal organizations who launched an attack in Kenscoff in February that killed dozens.
- 3 August – Nine people, including an Irish missionary and a child, are abducted from the Sainte-Hélène orphanage in Kenscoff by suspected gangs. They are released on 29 August.
- 9 August – The government imposes a three-month state of emergency in Artibonite, Centre and Ouest Departments due to gang violence.
- 12 August –
  - The United States issues a $5 million reward for the arrest of G9 leader Jimmy Cherizier on charges of violating US sanctions.
  - Two police officers are killed in an attack by gangs in Kenscoff.
- 20 August – Two police officers are killed in an accidental drone explosion at a SWAT base in Kenscoff.
- 25 August – Police retake the Téléco hub in Kenscoff from gangs.
- 31 August – Two people, including a Kenyan peacekeeper, are killed in an accident involving two armored vehicles in Port-au-Prince that also injures eight Kenyan peacekeepers.

=== September ===
- 5 September – The United States Federal Aviation Administration extends a ban on US commercial flights to Haiti until 7 March 2026, citing the ongoing gang war.
- 10 September – The United States deports 132 Haitians to Cap-Haïtien, the largest flight to date and the first involving minors under Donald Trump’s second term.
- 12 September – At least 42 people are reported killed following an attack by the Viv Ansanm gang on the village of Labodrie.
- 15 September – A gang attack on an armored vehicle kills the driver and injures two police officers in Kenscoff.
- 16 September – Former Artibonite Resistance Front leader Wilfort Ferdinand, who participated in the overthrow of president Jean-Bertrand Aristide in 2004, is shot dead in a shootout at a police checkpoint in Gonaïves.
- 18 September – One person is killed in an attack by gangs on the town of Bassin-Bleu.
- 20 September – Fifteen people are killed, including at least eight children in a drone attack on a birthday party in Cité Soleil where an alleged gang leader was distributing gifts.
- 22 September – The United States imposes sanctions on former MP Arnel Belizaire and former senator Antonio Chéramy for corruption.
- 23 September – Businessman Dimitri Vorbe is arrested in the United States on unspecified charges.
- 30 September – The United Nations Security Council approves a resolution to transform the Multinational Security Support Mission to a larger Gang Suppression Force of up to 5,500 police officers and military personnel to combat gang violence.

=== October ===
- 9 October – A meeting of the Transitional Presidential Council at the National Palace in Port-au-Prince is halted by gunfire blamed on gangs, resulting in the evacuation of government officials.
- 13 October – An appeals court overturns the indictment of 51 people over the assassination of Jovenel Moïse in 2021 and orders a new investigation.
- 15 October – Médecins Sans Frontières permanently closes its emergency care center in Port-au-Prince due to gang violence.
- 23 October – One person is killed by a falling tree in Marigot due to Hurricane Melissa. Five others are injured by floods in Artibonite Department.
- 29 October – At least 25 people are killed in flooding caused by Hurricane Melissa in Petit-Goâve.

=== November ===
- 13 November – A shootout occurs between suspected gang members and US Marines guarding the US embassy in Port-au-Prince.
- 14 November – A police helicopter is destroyed after making an emergency landing following an operation in Croix-des-Bouquets that leaves seven gang members dead.
- 17 November – A police officer is killed in an attack by gangs on Arcahaie.
- 18 November – Haiti qualifies for the 2026 FIFA World Cup after defeating Nicaragua 2-0 at the 2026 FIFA World Cup qualification in Curaçao.
- 23 November – A Sunrise Airways aircraft is reportedly hit by bullets while taxiing on the tarmac at Port-au-Prince's Toussaint Louverture International Airport after arriving from Les Cayes, forcing the airline to cancel all of its domestic routes in Haiti.
- 25 November – The United States imposes sanctions on an unidentified member of the Transitional Presidential Council for alleged ties with gangs; Fritz Jean subsequently acknowledges being the recipient.

=== December ===
- 1 December – The Transitional Presidential Council approves an electoral law that would enable general elections to be held in 2026 after a 10-year hiatus.
- 3 December – Joly Germine, the leader of the 400 Mawozo gang, is sentenced to life imprisonment by a court in the United States for the abduction of 17 US and Canadian nationals undertaking a missionary tour in Port-au-Prince in 2021.
- 8 December – At least 49 people are killed in clashes between component gangs of the Viv Ansanm coalition in Port-au-Prince.
- 10 December – Compas is recognized as intangible cultural heritage by UNESCO.

== Holidays ==
- 1 January – New Year's Day
- 2 January – Founders Day
- 4 March – Carnival
- 5 March – Ash Wednesday
- 18 April – Good Friday
- 20 April – Easter Sunday
- 1 May – Labour and Agriculture Day
- 29 May – Ascension Day
- 18 May – Flag Day and Universities Day
- 19 June – Corpus Christi
- 15 August – Assumption of Mary
- 17 October – Dessalines Day
- 1 November – All Saints' Day
- 2 November – All Souls' Day
- 18 November – Battle of Vertières Day
- 5 December – Discovery Day
- 25 December – Christmas Day

== Deaths ==
- 15 January – Rosny Smarth, 84, prime minister (1996–1997).
- 20 February – Frankétienne, 88, writer (Dézafi), poet and painter (Désastre (12 janvier 2010), Difficile émergence vers la lumière).
- 31 March – Mario Joseph, 62, human rights lawyer.
- 12 August – Joseph Willy Romélus, 94, Roman Catholic prelate, bishop of Jérémie (1977–2009).
- 28 August – Gary Didier Perez, 59, singer-songwriter.
- 18 September – Déjean Bélizaire, 90, president of the Senate (1991–1993).

== See also ==
- 2020s
- 2025 Atlantic hurricane season
- 2025 in the Caribbean
