= Antonio Chéramy =

Antonio Chéramy, alias Don Kato, is an actor, singer, and political leader in Haiti. He was elected to the Haitian Senate in 2015. He left the Senate in 2020. He has been part of the opposition and blocked Jean Michel Lapin's Prime Minister nomination on the Senate floor in 2019.

He is the lead singer for the musical group Posse Brothers, and was banned from multiple Haitian Carnivals due to lyrics bashing President Michel Martelly. He starred in the 2003 film I Love You Anne and its 2013 sequel We Love You Anne.

In 2018 he resigned from the VERITE political party. In 2019 he stated that the U.S. consulate cancelled his visa. In 2019, he and dozens of other prominent Haitians were banned from the Dominican Republic for alleged illegal activities.

In 2025, he was sanctioned by the United States for involvement in "significant corruption".

== See also ==
- 2015–16 Haitian parliamentary election
