= Fritz William Michel =

Haitian politician (born 1980)

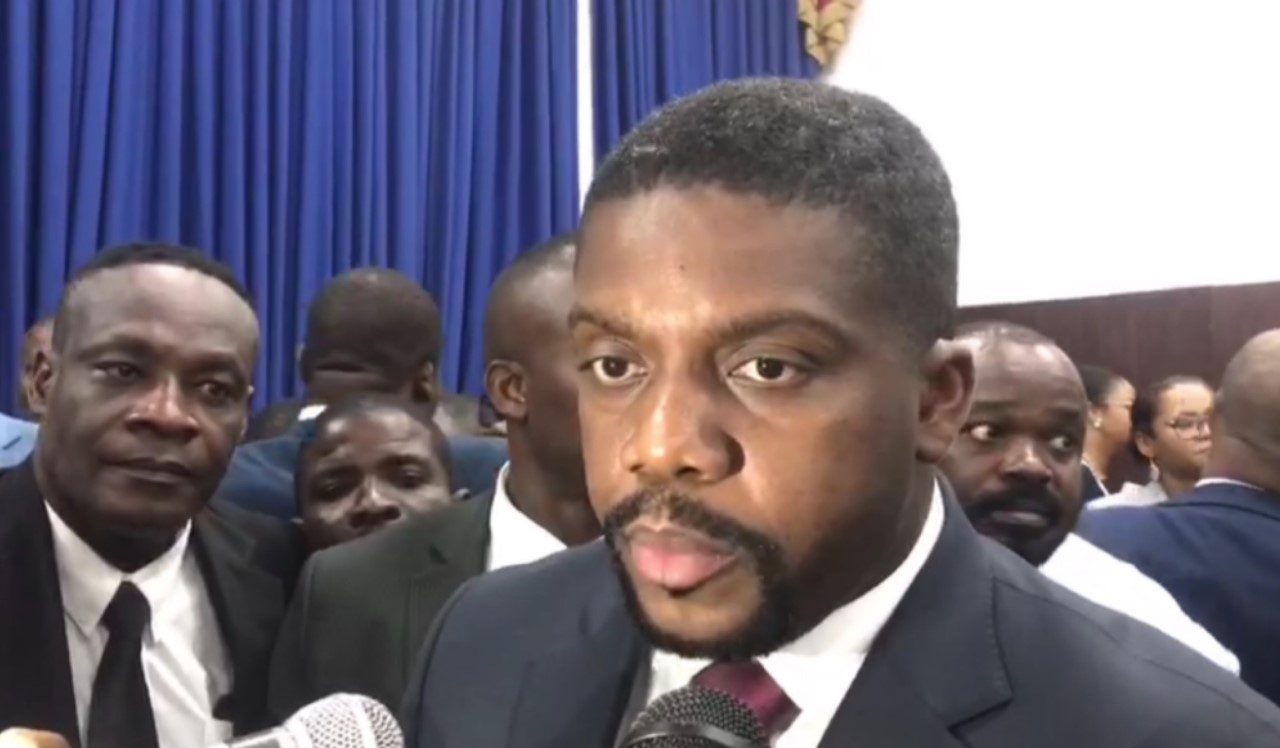

Acting Prime Minister of Haiti
- In office 22 July 2019 – 30 July 2019
- President: Jovenel Moïse
- Preceded by: Jean Michel Lapin (Acting Prime Minister)
- Succeeded by: Jean-Henry Céant (Prime Minister)

Chief Accountant at the Ministry of Economy and Finance
- In office 2009–2011
- President: René Préval

Personal details
- Born: 1980 (age 45–46) Port Au Prince, Haiti
- Education: University of Haiti

Fritz William Michel (born 1980) is a Haitian politician who was nominated for Prime Minister of Haiti on 22 July 2019, but was not confirmed as such by parliament.

He was previously the Chief Accountant at the Ministry of the Economy and Finance from 2009 to 2011.
