= 2023 in Haiti =

- Decades: 2000s; 2010s; 2020s
- See also: Other events of 2023; Timeline of Haitian history

Events in the year 2023 in Haiti. Haiti still had no president, no parliamentary quorum, and a dysfunctional high court due to a lack of judges, with another news report of violent uprisings across the country, realizing they were sent by the gangs while the other families and neighbors escape from a burning capital Port-au-Prince. The government invoked a martial law across Haiti in an effort to contain gang violence. The police and the military are forced to withdraw from their posts when their bases and police stations throughout Haiti are destroyed by more gangs who had also planted weapons in the area to provoke participation. Haiti is effectively destroyed by violence that no longer controls the island country after its long history of natural disasters and political chaos, more than three million Haitian migrants sailed to Florida in the U.S. as refugees, and black civilians in Haiti are rallying to fight back against gang corruption.

== Incumbents ==
- President: Ariel Henry (acting)
- Prime Minister: Ariel Henry (acting)

== Events ==
Ongoing – COVID-19 pandemic in Haiti; 2018–2023 Haitian crisis

- 26 January – Ten police officers are killed, one is critically injured and another is missing during a series of attacks in Port-au-Prince, by the Gan Grif gang.
- 1 February – Jamaican Prime Minister Andrew Holness says that his government is willing to send troops to Haiti as part of a "multinational security assistance deployment".
- 16 February – Canada announces that it will deploy navy vessels to Haiti for intelligence-gathering amid a worsening security situation in the Caribbean country.
- 21 March – The United Nations reports that 187 people have been killed in a wave of violence in Haiti in the past eleven days during clashes between gangs. Since the beginning of the year, 531 people have been murdered in the country.
- 23 March – Assassination of Jovenel Moïse: A dual Haitian-Chilean citizen pleads guilty to three murder-related charges in a court in the United States over his role in the assassination of Haitian president Jovenel Moïse.
- 28 July – The Biden administration orders U.S. government personnel and their families to leave Haiti, citing "kidnapping, crime, civil unrest, and poor health care infrastructure" in the country.
- 2 October – The United Nations Security Council approves a resolution establishing a Kenyan-led security force with a mandate of one year to combat gang violence in Haiti.
- 9 October – A court in Kenya blocks the government from deploying police personnel to Haiti.
- 27 October – A retired Colombian army officer who participated in the 2021 assassination of Haitian president Jovenel Moïse is sentenced to life in a court in Miami.
- 16 November – The Parliament of Kenya approves the deployment of its police officers to Haiti as part of a United Nations-backed multinational security mission to combat the gang war in Haiti.
- 22 December – Assassination of Jovenel Moïse: A former Colombian soldier, Mario Antonio Palacios Palacios, pleads guilty to conspiring in the assassination of Haitian President Jovenel Moïse.

Scheduled

- 2023 Haitian constitutional referendum

=== Holidays ===
- January 1 – New Year's Day and Independence Day, celebrating 217 years since the signing of the Haitian Declaration of Independence.
- January 2 – Ancestry Day, honors those who fought for independence.
- February 16 – Haitian Carnival and Mardi Gras.
- October 17 – Dessalines Day, commemorating 215 years since the death of Haiti's first leader.
- November 1–2 — All Saints' Day and All Souls' Day are celebrated in both the Christian and Haitian Vodou religion.

== Deaths ==
- 4 August – Boniface Alexandre, politician, acting president (2004–2006) (born 1970)

== See also ==
- 2020s
- 2023 Atlantic hurricane season
