= 2015 in Haiti =

- Decades: 1990s; 2000s; 2010s; 2020s
- See also: Other events of 2015; Timeline of Haitian history

The following lists events that happened during 2015 in the Republic of Haiti.

== Incumbents ==
- President: Michel Martelly
- Prime Minister: Florence Duperval Guillaume (acting) (until 16 January), Evans Paul (starting 16 January)

== Events ==
=== January ===
- January 14 - The Haitian Parliament dissolves, causing political uncertainty.

=== February ===
- February 17 - Carnival festivities are cancelled after at least twenty people are killed in a float accident in Port-au-Prince.
