= Jean Victor Généus =

Haitian politician

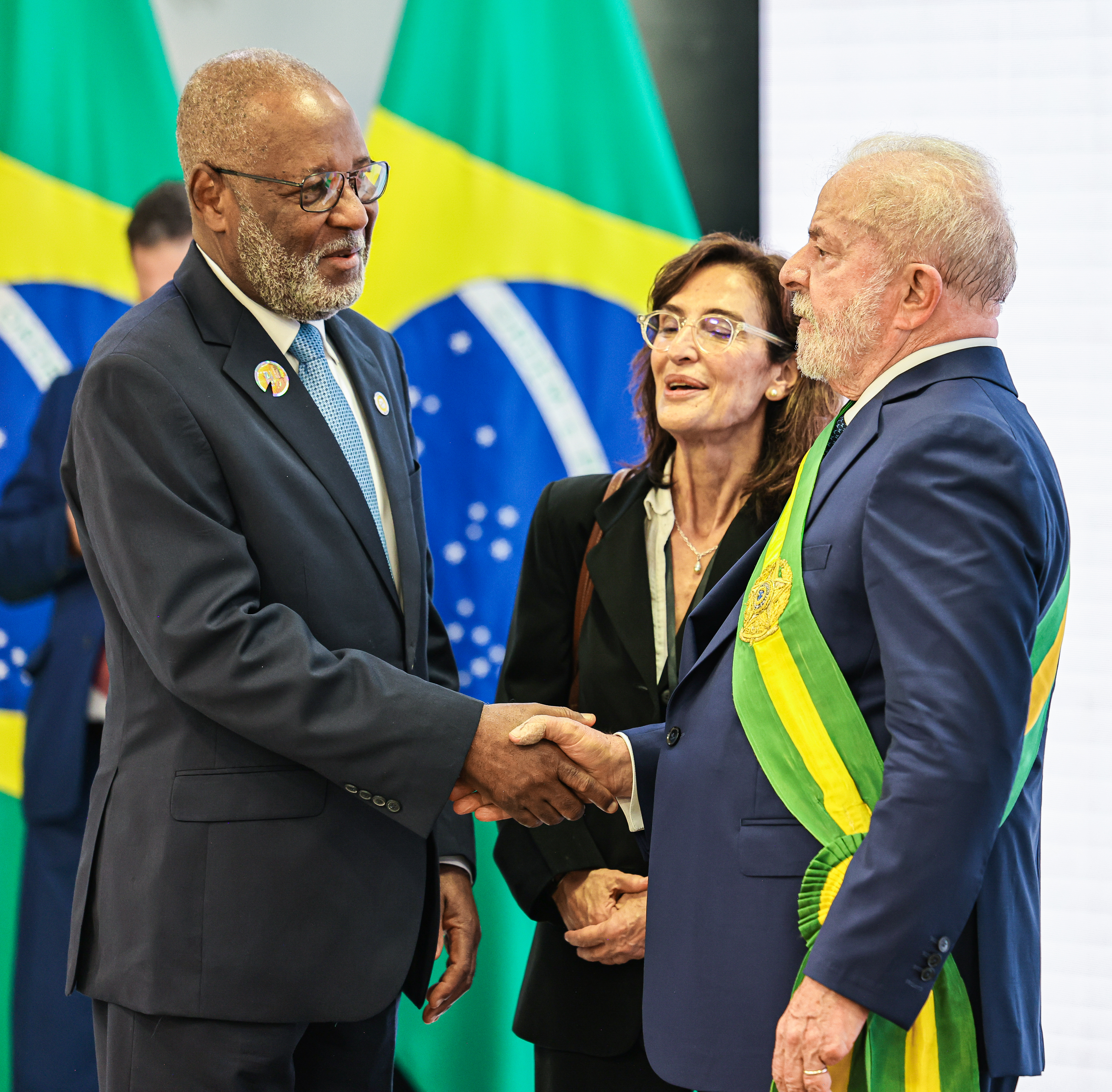
- Généus (left) meeting Lula da Silva in 2023

Minister of Foreign Affairs
- In office 25 November 2021 – 24 April 2024
- Prime Minister: Ariel Henry (acting)
- Preceded by: Claude Joseph
- Succeeded by: Dominique Dupuy

Jean Victor Généus is a Haitian politician who served as the Minister of Foreign Affairs from 24 November 2021 to 24 April 2024.
