= Renmen Ayiti =

Political party in Haiti

Renmen Ayiti Aimer Haïti
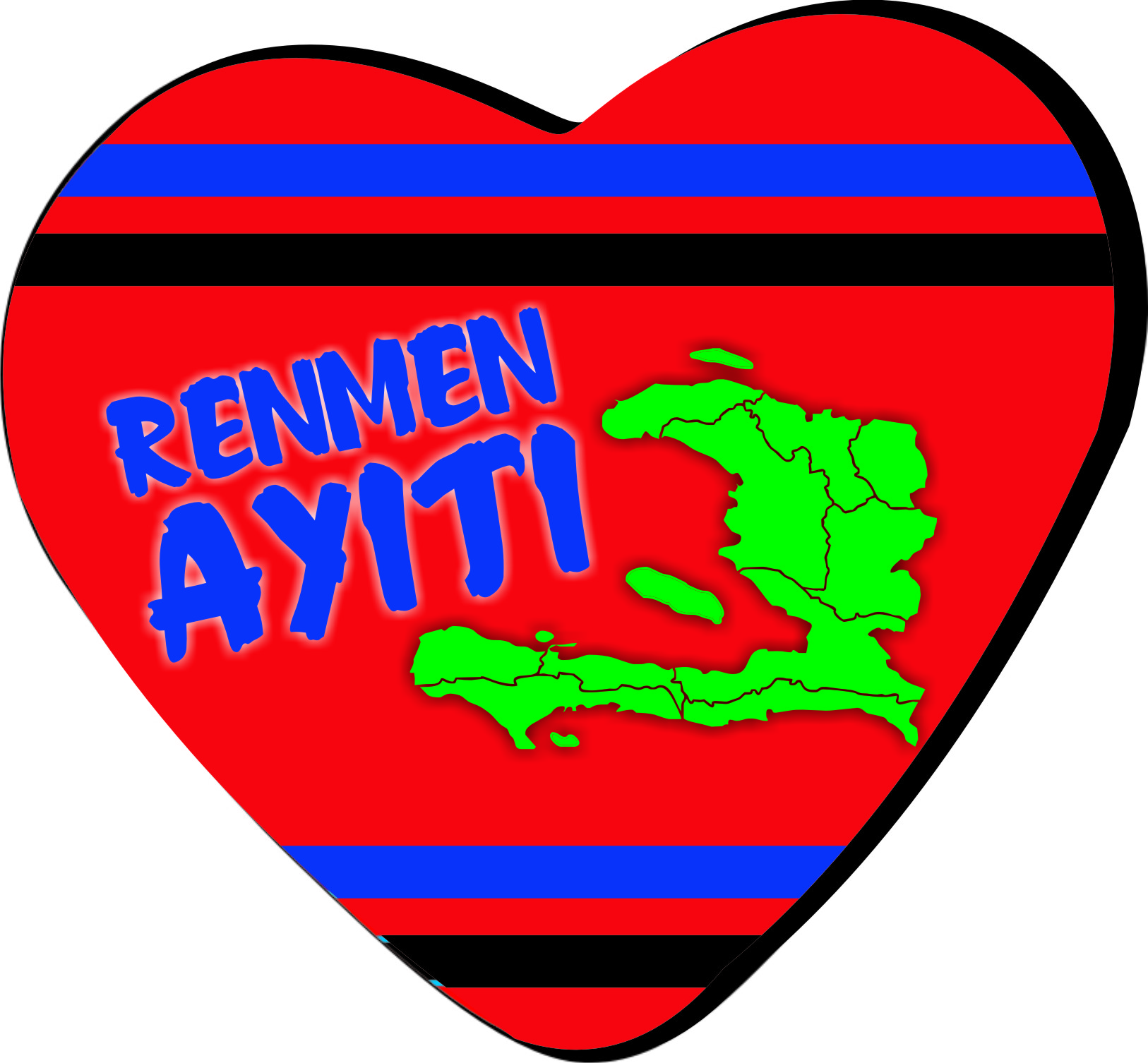
- Abbreviation: RA
- Founder: Jean-Henry Céant
- Senate: 0 / 30
- Chamber of Deputies: 3 / 119

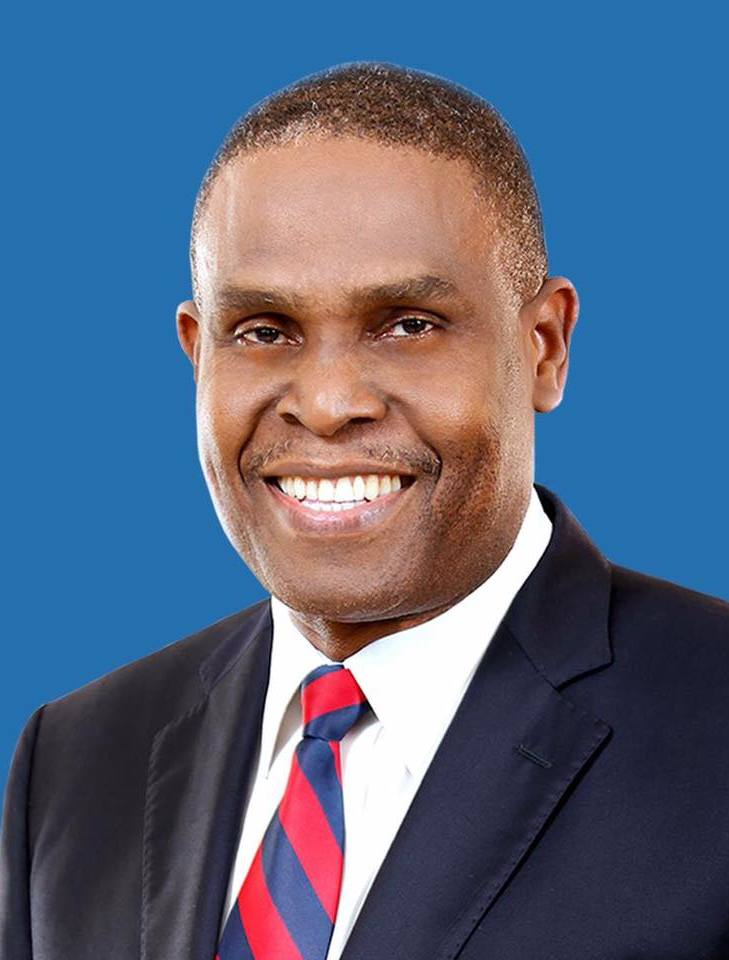
Jean-Henry Céant, the leader of Renmen Ayiti

Renmen Ayiti (Haitian Creole for "Love Haiti"; French: Aimer Haïti) or RA is a Haitian political party led and founded by Jean-Henry Céant.

== Electoral history ==
Céant ran for president of Haiti two times under the banner of Renmen Ayiti, once in 2010 and once in 2015. In his first campaign, he came in fourth, with 8% of the vote, and in his second he finished sixth, with only 2.5% of the vote.

The party has had limited electoral success, winning no seats in the Chamber of Deputies or Senate in the 2010-11 elections, and only 2 seats in the Chamber of Deputies in the 2015-16 cycle.

== Political Platform ==
Céant and his party have been seen as allies of former president Jean-Bertrand Aristide and his Fanmi Lavalas party.

In 2015, Renmen Ayiti denounced the CEP's rules on parties registering for elections as restrictive, with Euvonie Georges Auguste, a Vodou priestess and then-member of the party's office of electoral affairs, calling the process exclusionary.

In 2024, the party called to amend the Haitian constitution in order to improve stability and make elections more democratic. In 2025, they called for another amendment "opening political life to Haitians living abroad, including those with dual nationality," allowing members of the Haitian diaspora to vote in Haitian elections.

In 2025, the party issued a denouncement of then Prime Minister and member of Haiti's Transitional Presidential Council Fritz Alphonse Jean, calling him irresponsible and calling the actions of the council "a betrayal of the nation." In July 2025, the party proposed their own plan for transition, bypassing that of the council, amidst the ongoing Haitian crisis.
