= Janine Tavernier =

Haitian poet, novelist, and academic (1935–2019)

Personal details
- Born: March 23, 1935
- Died: February 27, 2019 (aged 83)

Janine Tavernier (March 23, 1935 in Port-au-Prince – February 27, 2019) was a Haitian poet, novelist and academic.
