= Annette Auguste =

Haitian folk singer and activist (died 2020)

Annette Auguste (also known as Sò Anne or Sò Ann, 1940 or 1941 – 17 April 2020) was a Haitian folk singer and activist.

Auguste was one of the founding members of Fanmi Lavalas. She was arrested by US Marines on 9 May 2004 and held in prison on claims of involvement in a December 2003 attack at the University of Haiti. Amnesty International called her a political prisoner and said that "Amnesty International believes that Annette Auguste is being held arbitrarily since the Haitian authorities have failed to produce any evidence to charge her and have failed to release her within the normal terms." Due to disagreements within Fanmi Lavalas, she left it and in 2015 ran for Senate with the Haitian Tèt Kale Party.
