= COVID-19 vaccination in Haiti =

Haiti has one of the lowest vaccination rates against COVID-19 in the world, with only 5% of the population having received at least one dose of the COVID-19 vaccine by the end of 2023. The country was the last in the Americas to receive a COVID-19 vaccine, with half a million donated doses first arriving from the United States in July 2021. UNICEF was responsible for the distribution of vaccines, which was made more difficult by a lack of existing health infrastructure, political and gang violence, and the spread of misinformation.
