= Claude Joseph =

Haitian politician and foreign minister

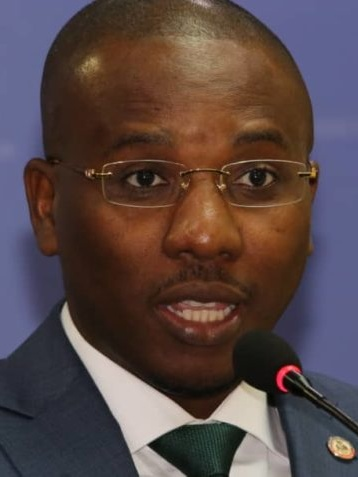
- Joseph in 2020

Prime Minister of Haiti
- Acting
- In office 14 April 2021 – 20 July 2021
- President: Jovenel Moïse; Vacant
- Preceded by: Joseph Jouthe
- Succeeded by: Ariel Henry (acting)

Minister of Foreign Affairs and Worship
- In office 4 March 2020 – 25 November 2021
- Prime Minister: Joseph Jouthe; Himself (acting); Ariel Henry (acting)
- Preceded by: Bocchit Edmond
- Succeeded by: Jean Victor Généus

Personal details
- Born: 4 April 1980 (age 46)
- Party: Les Engagés pour le Développement (2022–present)
- Education: Long Island University (MPA); New School (PhD)

Claude Joseph (French pronunciation: [klod ʒozɛf]) is a Haitian politician who served as acting prime minister of Haiti from 14 April to 20 July 2021 and as Minister of Foreign Affairs and Worship from 4 March 2020 to 24 November 2021.

Joseph was appointed acting Prime Minister following the resignation of Joseph Jouthe. Following the assassination of President Jovenel Moïse on 7 July 2021, Joseph led the Council of Ministers, which exercises executive power during a presidential vacancy. This role was disputed by acting Prime Minister-designate Ariel Henry and Senate leader Joseph Lambert. On 19 July 2021, it was announced that Joseph would yield the acting prime ministership to Henry and remain the Minister of Foreign Affairs and Worship. He stepped down as the foreign minister in November 2021.

In February 2024, he was indicted for alleged complicity in President Moïse's assassination alongside Moïse's widow Martine Moïse and a former chief of the Haitian police.

== Early life and education ==
Joseph holds a doctorate in public policy from The New School in New York City where he was awarded a full merit-based scholarship as well as the Isador Lubin Fellowship, and worked as a university professor in the United States. He has taught at the University of Connecticut and Long Island University.

On 4 March 2020, he became Minister of Foreign Affairs in the government of Prime Minister Joseph Jouthe.

== Acting Prime Minister of Haiti ==
After the resignation of Jouthe, he was appointed interim prime minister by President Jovenel Moïse on 14 April 2021. Moïse chose Ariel Henry to succeed him in this role, but did not sign Henry's appointment.

On 7 July 2021, President Moïse was assassinated and First Lady Martine Moïse was injured during an attack at their residence in Pétion-Ville. Joseph assumed political control of the government, and blamed the attack on "a group of unidentified individuals, some of whom spoke in Spanish and English." At that time, Joseph stated that he was in control of the country. The legal succession to the presidency was unclear. Meanwhile, eight out of ten sitting members of Haiti's Senate chose the Senate speaker Joseph Lambert as the interim President on 9 July.

The United Nations special envoy for Haiti, Helen La Lime, said on 8 July 2021 that Joseph would lead Haiti until an election is held later in the year, urging all parties to set aside differences. The United States meanwhile recognized Joseph as the interim Prime Minister of Haiti.

A group of prominent diplomats to Haiti called the "Core Group", which is made up of ambassadors to Haiti from Brazil, the European Union, France, Germany, Spain and the United States, in addition to representatives to Haiti from the Organization of American States and the United Nations, called on Ariel Henry to take charge as the head of the government.

On 19 July, Joseph announced in an interview with The Washington Post that he would be stepping down soon and handing over power to Henry, whom he had met with many times in the past week to resolve the dispute, but expected that he will remain the foreign minister in that government. He added that he was doing it to honor the late President Moïse's final wish. Upon being questioned by The New York Times, he rejected that he was stepping down due to international pressure. Henry was sworn in on 20 July, while Joseph retained the post of foreign minister.

== Post-premiership ==
Joseph was replaced as foreign minister by Jean Victor Généus on 25 November 2021. He has defied Acting President Ariel Henry, instigating upheaval against the Haitian administration.

On 3 September 2022, Joseph launched his own political party named Les Engagés pour le Développement ("Committed to Development"). On 7 September, Joseph was declared persona non grata by the Dominican Republic and is not allowed to enter that country.

On 19 February 2024, Joseph, along with Jovenel's widow Martine Moïse and former police chief Léon Charles, were indicted by a judge in connection to Jovenel Moïse's assassination. Joseph and Martine were charged with complicity and criminal association, while Charles was charged with murder and attempted murder. It is alleged that Joseph and Martine Moïse conspired together to replace Moïse with Joseph. Joseph denied the accusation and accused Ariel Henry of orchestrating the case for political reasons. He said that Henry was "the main beneficiary" of the assassination. The indictment was overturned on 13 October 2025 following an appeal.

== Notes ==
Political offices
| Preceded by Bocchit Edmond | Minister of Foreign Affairs and Worship; 2020–2021 | Succeeded by Jean Victor Généus |
| Preceded by Joseph Jouthe | Prime Minister of Haiti; Acting; 2021 | Succeeded by Ariel Henry; Acting |
