= COVID-19 pandemic in Haiti =

- Disease: COVID-19
- Pathogen: SARS-CoV-2
- Location: Haiti
- Index case: Port-au-Prince
- Arrival date: 19 March 2020 (6 years, 7 months, 1 week and 1 day)
- Confirmed cases: 10,077
- Active cases: 1,184
- Suspected cases: 32,304 (Note: A patient is suspected to have COVID-19 (determined by clinicians) when they have a fever of 38 degree Celsius or more, or have a recent history (in the last 14 days) of fever, whether or not they have other symptoms such as coughing, breathing difficulties or unexplained headache. They may also have sudden altered taste (dysgeusia or ageusia) or smell (hyposmia or anosmia) without associated rhinitis. For children, they may exhibit all or some of the prior signs, diarrhea or isolated fever especially in children under 3 months of age.)
- Recovered: 8,657 (Note: A confirmed COVID-19 patient is deemed to have recovered if they do not show symptoms for at least 10 days, whether or not they are tested negative (resuming the test if possible).)
- Deaths: 236

Government website
- https://mspp.gouv.ht

The COVID-19 pandemic in Haiti is part of the worldwide pandemic of coronavirus disease 2019 (COVID-19) caused by severe acute respiratory syndrome coronavirus 2 (SARS-CoV-2). The virus was confirmed to have reached Haiti in March 2020. The index case was in Port-au-Prince. As of 14 September 2021, there are 21,178 total confirmed cases, 1,184 active cases, about 32,000 suspected cases, with 591 deaths and 8,657 recoveries. Haiti has administered 50,624 doses of the COVID-19 vaccination.

== Background ==
On 12 January 2020, the World Health Organization (WHO) confirmed that a novel coronavirus was the cause of a respiratory illness in a cluster of people in Wuhan, Hubei, China, which was reported to the WHO on 31 December 2019.

The case fatality ratio for COVID-19 has been much lower than SARS of 2003, but the transmission has been significantly greater, with a significant total death toll.

A 2019 study reported that for a population of more than 11 million, Haiti only has an estimated 124 Intensive care unit (ICU) beds and 64 ventilators.

== Timeline ==
Cases

Deaths

=== 2020 ===
==== March ====
On 16 March, at midnight local time, Haiti's Prime Minister, Joseph Jouthe, announced a two-week suspension of flights from Europe, Canada, the Dominican Republic, and Latin America.

On 19 March, the first two COVID-19 cases in the country were confirmed.

==== April ====
On 5 April, the country confirmed its first death from COVID-19.

On 9 April, the World Bank's Board of Executive Directors approved a US$20 million grant for the Haiti COVID-19 Response Project.

On 12 April, The Intercept wrote that "the Haitian government has closed schools and most factories and is encouraging people to adopt social distancing measures."

On 15 April 2020 the Prime Minister of Haiti Joseph Jouthe announced that Haiti would reopen textile factories the following Monday 20 April. Textiles account for 90 percent of Haiti's exports, and the industry would resume at 30 percent capacity to ensure workplace social distancing.

The Miami Herald wrote that Jouthe's messaging "seems counter to what the regional health experts are telling countries in the region," noting that Pan American Health Organization Director Carissa Etienne had warned that social distancing "remains our best bet to reduce transmission and slow the spread of the virus" and stated that "COVID-19 has yet to hit with full force in our region, particularly in Latin America and the Caribbean, and we expect it to intensify in the next few weeks," and that "the rise in hospitalizations and deaths we see in some countries highlights how quickly the situation could change."

==== May ====
On 5 May, Dr. Etienne, Director of the Pan American Health Organization, expressed her worries about Haiti. There are already 17,000 repatriates and that number is expected to rise to 55,000. Etienne called the situation "a perfect storm approaching."

On 8 May, the United Nations' Economic and Social Council's Ad-Hoc Advisory Group on Haiti expressed concern that "Unless adequately managed, the COVID-19 health emergency and its socio-economic impact could become a humanitarian catastrophe, threatening to unravel some of the hard-won development and security gains achieved in the past decade and a half in Haiti".

About a third of Haitians practice Vodou, and in view of the shortage of medical facilities, by late May, the Vodou community had identified 1,000 Vodou temples with space available that could be used to isolate up to 15 COVID-19 patients each. Reuters quoted Vodou priestess (mambo) Lamercie Charles as stating that "We live in a country where the health system is not able to respond to the challenge of the pandemic, so we rely on natural remedies instead... I consider my temple a clinic".

==== June ====
On 4 June, Doctors Without Borders/Medecins Sans Frontieres (MSF) expressed alarm that the number of COVID-19 cases in Haiti had increased rapidly in less than one month from 100 cases to more than 2,600 cases and 50 deaths.

=== 2021 ===
==== July ====
On July 7, 2021, Haiti's former president, Jovenel Moise was assassinated, leaving Haiti with an unstable political system during the COVID-19 pandemic. The first doses of the COVID-19 vaccine were delivered on July 13, 2021, to Haiti. 500,000 vaccine doses were made available to the Haitians.

==== August ====
On 14 August 2021, Haiti experienced a 7.2 magnitude earthquake. The natural disaster has disrupted the COVID-19 response and vaccine distribution.

==== September ====
As of 17 September 2021, 0.16% of Haitians had been fully vaccinated against COVID-19 and 0.21% had received at least one dose. Non-governmental organizations assisting with the response to the earthquake were also providing vaccinations.

== Analysis & commentary ==
Richard Frechette, a 67-year-old physician and Roman Catholic priest from the United States who is working in Haiti, stated in an article published on 9 April 2020 that

My sister in the United States, sheltering in her place, is enjoying swordfish and salmon every night and playing scrabble. But for here, somebody having to shelter in a place with no chance to go on the streets and hustle to make enough money to live for today, means that tonight they are going to be sitting on their own, hungry with their children and worried about tomorrow.... hand to mouth every day. That's what makes the measures difficult to apply.

== See also ==
- COVID-19 pandemic in North America
- COVID-19 pandemic by country
- Influx of disease in the Caribbean
- HIV/AIDS in Latin America
- 2013–2014 chikungunya outbreak
- 2009 swine flu pandemic
- 2019–2020 dengue fever epidemic
- COVID-19 vaccination in Haiti

== Notes ==
- "Bulletin du 21 juin 2020 de la surveillance du nouveau Coronavirus 2019 (COVID-19)" (PDF). mspp.gouv.ht.
