= 2024 in Haiti =

- Decades: 2000s; 2010s; 2020s
- See also: Other events of 2024; Timeline of Haitian history

Events in the year 2024 in Haiti.

== Incumbents ==
- President: Ariel Henry (acting, resigned April 12); Transitional Presidential Council (April 12 onwards);
- Prime Minister:
  - until 25 February: Ariel Henry (formally resigned April 25)
  - 25 February: Michel Patrick Boisvert (acting until May 28)
  - Garry Conille; (3 June until 10 November)
  - Alix Didier Fils-Aimé; (onwards)

== Events ==
=== March ===
- 1 March –
  - Kenyan president William Ruto announces an agreement with Haiti to deploy 1,000 police officers in a mission approved by the United Nations to combat gang violence in the Caribbean nation.
  - The G9 gang launches an offensive within Port-au-Prince, with its leader Jimmy Chérizier announcing the aim of capturing the Haitian cabinet and police chief. Four police officers are killed during a shooting outside a police station.
- 3 March – Between 3,700 and 4,000 prisoners escape from the National Penitentiary in Port-au-Prince. The Haitian government declares a 72-hour state of emergency to recapture them.
- 4 March – Gangs exchange gunfire with police and soldiers in an attempt to seize control of Toussaint Louverture International Airport in Port-au-Prince.
- 6 March – Prime Minister Ariel Henry is stranded in Puerto Rico after an international trip, while unable to get back to Haiti amid gang violence.
- 7 March – Haiti's main seaport Port international de Port-au-Prince suspends operations after being attacked and looted by armed gangs. The national state of emergency is also extended for another month amid ongoing civil unrest.
- 10 March – The U.S. military airlifts non-essential personnel from the U.S. embassy in Port-au-Prince, amid escalating violence in the country.
- 12 March – Prime Minister Ariel Henry announces that he would resign once a transitional presidential council is formed.
- 14 March – Streamer Addison Pierre Maalouf, also known as YourFellowArab, is kidnapped by members of the 400 Mawozo gang while on a trip to Haiti to interview Jimmy Chérizier.
- 20 March – Gangs attack the neighborhood of Petion-Ville in Port-au-Prince, killing at least five people.
- 22 March – Prominent gang leader Ti Greg, who escaped prison earlier in March, is shot dead by police.
- 31 March – Canada deploys 70 members of its armed forces to Jamaica to train peacekeepers for a future intervention in Haiti.

=== April ===
- 25 April – Ariel Henry formally resigns as Prime Minister of Haiti and is replaced by the Transitional Presidential Council.

=== May ===
- 2 May – Thirteen people are killed in flooding and landslides in Cap-Haitien.
- 20 May – Toussaint Louverture International Airport reopens after being closed for three months due to gang violence, as the US military flies in supplies and civilian contractors to help the police in order to pave a way for an intervention.
- 22 May – A tornado strikes Bassin-Bleu, injuring 50 people and destroying 200 houses.
- 24 May – Two American Christian missionaries, one of them the daughter of a Missouri State Representative, and a Haitian pastor are killed in a gang ambush in Port-au-Prince.
- 28 May – Garry Conille is named the new Prime Minister of Haiti by the Transitional Presidential Council.

=== June ===
- 25 June – Kenyan police units arrive in Haiti for a United Nations-backed security mission to restore order.
- 29 June – The Biden administration expands its Temporary Protected Status program to 309,000 Haitian refugees in the United States until February 2026, offering the refugees deportation relief and work permits.

=== July ===
- 19 July – A migrant boat travelling from Fort Saint-Michel to the Turks and Caicos Islands catches fire off Cap-Haïtien, leaving at least 40 people dead.

=== August ===
- 16 August – Several inmates escape from a prison in Saint-Marc following a strike by prison staff. Eleven of them are subsequently killed in police operations, while a twelfth is recaptured.
- 20 August – The US imposes sanctions on former president Michel Martelly for alleged involvement in drug trafficking and sponsorship of gangs involved in the Haitian crisis.
- 28 August – Haitian National Police and Kenya Police, along with other foreign police forces as part of the Multinational Security Support Mission in Haiti, launch a joint operation to oust criminal gangs from parts of Port-au-Prince.

=== September ===
- 4 September – The government extends the state of emergency that it had declared in Ouest Department in March due to gang violence to cover the entire country.
- 12 September – Twenty-four police and military personnel arrive from Jamaica to help the UN-backed, Kenyan led operation against gang violence.
- 14 September – At least 26 people are killed and 40 others are injured after a fuel truck overturns and explodes in Miragoane as bystanders were trying to collect gasoline.
- 18 September –
  - The Transitional Presidential Council creates a provisional electoral council to prepare for elections expected by 2026.
  - Kerwin Augustin, a regional official of the National Office of Migration, is shot dead by unidentified gunmen in Cap-Haïtien.
- 21 September – Kenyan President William Ruto visits Haiti to inspect the Kenyan peacekeeping contingent.
- 27 September – The United Nations reports during the first six months of this year at least 3,661 have been killed in Haiti, including 100 children, amid the ongoing gang violence.
- 30 September – The United Nations Security Council unanimously votes to extend the Kenyan-led multinational police mission to Haiti until 2 October 2025. In addition, an Integrated Food Security Phase Classification declares the presence of famine conditions in Haiti, with nearly 6,000 in starvation and nearly half of the country facing Level 4 "crisis" levels of acute food insecurity due to ongoing gang warfare and economic instability.

=== October ===
- 2 October – The United Nations International Organization for Migration reports that over 700,000 Haitians are internally displaced in the country due to gang violence, with more than half being children.
- 3 October – At least 115 people are killed in an attack by the Grand Grif gang on Pont-Sondé.
- 10 October – An unspecified number of casualties are reported in an attack by the Taliban gang on Arcahaie.
- 12–14 October – Twenty members of the Kraze Baryè gang are killed during police operations against the group in Torcelle.
- 17 October – Gangs launch attacks on the Solino, Saint Michel and Tabarre 27 neighborhoods of Port-au-Prince.
- 18 October – The United Nations Security Council unanimously votes to expand its preexisting arms embargo on Haiti to include all kinds of weapons and ammunition.
- 22 October – A boat carrying members of the Viv Ansanm gang capsizes after hitting a reef near Arcahaie, killing at least 12 passengers.
- 23 October – A UN helicopter is shot at shortly after taking off from Port-au-Prince, forcing it to land again with no injuries recorded among the 18 people on board.

=== November ===
- 10 November – Garry Conille is removed as prime minister by the Transitional Presidential Council and is replaced by Alix Didier Fils-Aimé.
- 11 November – A Spirit Airlines passenger aircraft is fired upon by gangs while landing at Toussaint Louverture International Airport in Port-au-Prince, forcing its diversion to the Dominican Republican and the cancellation of multiple flights to Haiti.
- 19 November –
  - Twenty-eight suspected Viv Ansanm members are killed in an attack by the gang on Pétion-Ville.
  - Médecins Sans Frontières suspends operations in Haiti amid threats to its staff by police.

=== December ===
- 6–11 December – At least 207 people are killed in Cité Soleil, Port-au-Prince as part of a series of attacks targeting elderly people and voodoo practitioners conducted by the Wharf Jeremie gang, whose leader Micanor Altès accused the victims of causing his son's fatal illness.
- 10 December – Nine people are killed in an attack by gangs on Petite Rivière de l'Artibonite.
- 24 December – Three people, including two journalists, are killed in a gun attack on the general hospital of Port-au-Prince.
- 26 December – The transitional government dismisses Duckenson Lorne as health minister over the attack on Port-au-Prince general hospital.

== Holidays ==
- 1 January - New Year's Day
- 2 January - Ancestry Day
- 6 January - Epiphany
- 12 January - Remembrance Day
- 13 February – Carnival
- 14 February – Ash Wednesday
- 29 March – Good Friday
- 31 March - Easter Sunday
- 1 May - Labour and Agriculture Day
- 9 May - Ascension Day
- 18 May - Flag Day and Universities Day
- 30 May - Corpus Christi
- 15 August - Assumption of Mary
- 17 October – Dessalines Day
- 1 November – All Saints' Day
- 2 November – All Souls' Day
- 18 November – Battle of Vertières Day
- 5 December - Discovery Day
- 25 December – Christmas Day

== See also ==
- 2020s
- 2024 Atlantic hurricane season
- 2024 in the Caribbean
