= Carlo Nayaradou =

French comic book author (1957–2021)

- Born: 5 June 1957; Fort-de-France, Martinique
- Died: 16 January 2021 (aged 63)
- Occupation: Comic Book Author

Carlo Nayaradou (5 June 1957 – 16 January 2021) was a French comic book author. Active in Metropolitan France and Martinique, he sought to create a comic strip in Creole.

== Publications ==
- Kréyon noir (1995)
- Éreksyon (2018)
- Ma liberté d'expression ! (2018)
- Images vs mots (2018)
- Bien le bonjour des Antilles, Mr le Ministre (2018)
