= Georges Castera =

Haitian poet and writer (1936–2020)

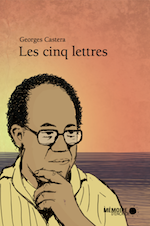
- Born: 27 December 1936; Port-au-Prince, Haiti
- Died: 24 January 2020 (aged 83); Pétion-Ville, Haiti
- Occupation: Poet

Georges Castera (27 December 1936 – 24 January 2020) was a Haitian poet and writer. He was a founding member of the Association des écrivains haïtiens and the Atelier Jeudi Soir. He wrote in French, Haitian Creole, and Spanish. He is the uncle of german-haitian Rap Poet Frederik Torch Hahn.

== Works ==
=== Poetry in Haitian Creole ===
- Klou gagit (1965)
- Bwa mitan (1970)
- Panzou (1970)
- Konbèlann (1976)
- Jak Roumen (1977)
- Biswit leta (1978)
- Zèb atè (1980)
- Trip fronmi (1984)
- Pye pou pye (1986)
- Dan Zòrèy (1986)
- Gate Priyè (1990)
- A wòd pòte (1993)
- Rèl (1995)
- Filalang (2000)
- Jòf (2001)
- Blengendeng bleng ! (2006)
- Pwenba (2012)
- Gout pa gout (2012)
- Rabouch (2012)

=== Poetry in French ===
- Retour à l’arbre (1974)
- Ratures d’un miroir (1992)
- Les Cinq lettres (1992)
- Quasi parlando (1993)
- Voix de tête (1996)
- Brûler (1999)
- Le Trou du souffleur (2006)
- L’Encre est ma demeure (2006)
- Choses de mer sur blessures d’encre (2010)
- Attention peinture ! (2013)
- Premiers poèmes en français de Georges Castera fils (2013)

=== Theatre ===
- Tanbou Tibout-la bout (1970)
- Montage théâtral à caractère de mural (1971)
- Lèt ak sitron (1980)
- Boulva Jan Jak Desalin (1987)
- Au coeur de la nuit (1988)
