= Jean-Michel Lapin =

Haitian politician

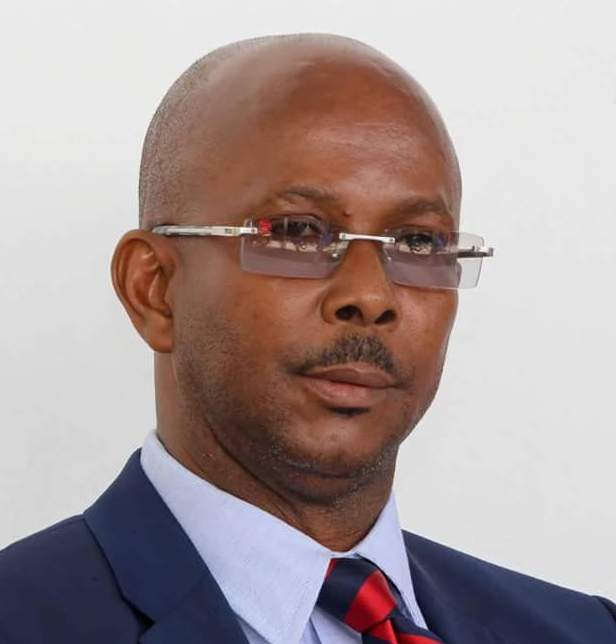

Acting Prime Minister of Haiti
- In office 21 March 2019 – 4 March 2020
- President: Jovenel Moïse
- Preceded by: Jean-Henry Céant
- Succeeded by: Joseph Jouthe

Jean-Michel Lapin (French pronunciation: [ʒɑ̃ miʃɛl lapɛ̃]) is a Haitian politician who served as acting Prime Minister of Haiti from 2019 to 2020.

Lapin was appointed by President Jovenel Moïse on March 21, 2019. He continued to serve despite his resignation on July 23, 2019, due to Parliament not confirming his appointment after four attempts at confirmation. Fritz William Michel was nominated to succeed him, but was not confirmed by parliament, and he was eventually succeeded by Joseph Jouthe.

== Career ==
He originally began working in government as a courier. He worked in the Ministry of Public Health and in the administration of the National Library of Haiti. In 2017, he was the director general of the Ministry of Culture and publicly stated that the Haitian government would pay the expense of having Manno Charlemagne's body returned to Haiti when the cultural icon died in Miami Beach. Before being appointed for the post of Prime Minister, Lapin served as Communications Minister.

=== Prime minister ===
Lapin was Moïse's third appointee for Prime Minister. Shortly after his nomination in 2019, opposition to Moïse culminated in violent protests, prompting Lapin to declare that the government would not "allow violence on the streets". A 2019 public transportation strike in Port-au-Prince resulted in Lapin stating that the city was not on lock-down.

In February 2020, while still serving as acting prime minister, Lapin condemned the actions of police officers who were protesting their pay and working conditions by firing their guns in public, wanton destruction of government property, and alleged arson of the viewing stands for the Pre-Lenten Carnival celebration. Lapin compared the actions to terrorism, saying that the police involved were "hiding behind [their] demands to sow disorder and chaos." He also stated that pay raises could not be instituted because of the regulations regarding the salaries of civil servants.

=== Post Prime Minister ===
As of 2023, Lapin stated that he supports a Haitian military, citing the need to remove the gangs and a "profound security problem".

He has also advocated for an economic and cultural alliance with Sint Maarten, spearheaded by Kevin Maingrette.

Judge Al Duniel Dimanche issued a warrant for Lapin's arrest, along with numerous other former government officials, on charges of corruption in January 2024. Lapin responded with a statement that he was never officially notified of the warrant, and that he considered the issuance illegal and unconstitutional.

== See also ==
Haitian crisis (2018–present)

Political offices
Preceded by Jean-Henry Céant	Prime Minister of Haiti; 2019–2020	Succeeded by Joseph Jouthe
