= Joseph Jouthe =

Prime Minister of Haiti from 2020 to 2021

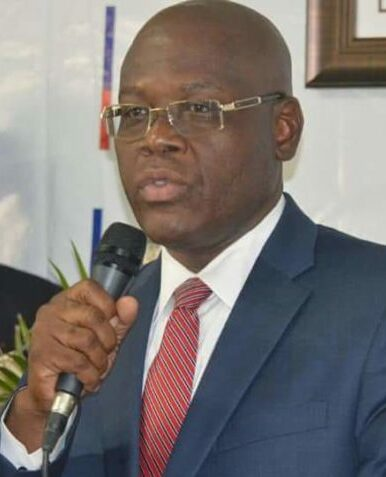
- Jouthe in 2018

22nd Prime Minister of Haiti
- In office 4 March 2020 – 14 April 2021
- President: Jovenel Moïse
- Preceded by: Jean-Henry Céant; Jean-Michel Lapin (acting)
- Succeeded by: Claude Joseph (acting)

Acting Minister of the Economy and Finance
- In office 30 September 2019 – 4 March 2020
- President: Jovenel Moïse
- Prime Minister: Jean-Michel Lapin (acting)
- Preceded by: Ronald December
- Succeeded by: Michel Patrick Boisvert

Minister of the Environment
- In office 19 September 2018 – 4 March 2020
- President: Jovenel Moïse
- Prime Minister: Jean-Henry Céant; Jean-Michel Lapin (acting)
- Preceded by: Pierre Simon George
- Succeeded by: Abner September

Personal details
- Born: 17 October 1961 (age 64) Thomonde, Haiti
- Party: Haitian Tèt Kale Party
- Occupation: Engineer

Joseph Jouthe (French pronunciation: [ʒozɛf ʒut], born 17 October 1961) is a Haitian politician who served as the 22nd prime minister of Haiti from 4 March 2020 to 14 April 2021.

== Biography ==
Jouthe was born on 17 October 1961 in Thomonde.

In September 2018, he became the Minister of the Environment under the government of Jean-Henry Céant. In September 2019, he became the acting Minister of Economy and Finance.

On 2 March 2020, Jouthe was named Prime Minister of Haiti, beginning his term two days later. He announced on 14 April 2021, that he has resigned as prime minister; Claude Joseph was then appointed by President Jovenel Moise to be his temporary replacement.

Political offices
| Preceded by Jean-Michel Lapin (acting) | Prime Minister of Haiti; 2020–2021 | Succeeded by Claude Joseph (acting) |
