= Jack Guy Lafontant =

Prime Minister of Haiti from 2017 to 2018

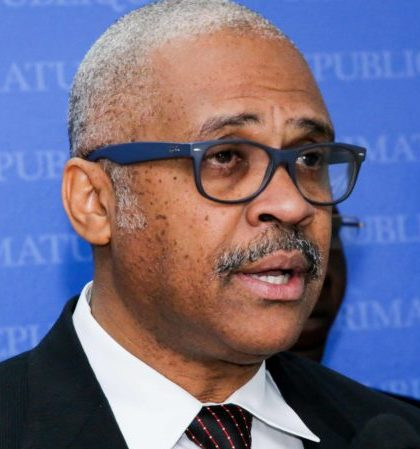
- Lafontant in 2017

20th Prime Minister of Haiti
- In office 21 March 2017 – 17 September 2018
- President: Jovenel Moïse
- Preceded by: Enex Jean-Charles
- Succeeded by: Jean-Henry Céant

Personal details
- Born: 4 April 1961 (age 65) Port-au-Prince, Haiti
- Party: Democratic Movement of Haiti – Democratic Rally of Haiti
- Education: State University of Haiti

Jack Guy Lafontant (born 4 April 1961) is a Haitian politician who served as Prime Minister of Haiti from 21 March 2017 until 16 September 2018.

== Early life and education ==
Lafontant studied medicine, specializing in gastroenterology and internal medicine and became a university instructor. He became a member of the Haitian Medical Association and the American College of Gastroenterology.

== Career ==
Lafontant is a member of the Rotary Club of Pétion-Ville, Port-au-Prince, and served as the group's president in 2016.

He was appointed as prime minister on 22 February 2017 and presented his cabinet on 13 March 2017. His government obtained a vote of confidence from the Senate on 16 March and from the Chamber of Deputies on 21 March, with 95 votes for and 6 against with 2 abstentions. He assumed his responsibilities the same day his government won the vote of confidence. His position as prime minister was his debut in politics.

Following deadly mass protests against a government plan to raise fuel prices, Lafontant announced on 14 July 2018 that he had submitted his resignation to President Moïse, who accepted it. Moise confirmed that he had accepted Lafontant's resignation and stated that he would work to find a new prime minister. He actually serves as caretaker.

Political offices
Preceded by Enex Jean-Charles	Prime Minister of Haiti; 2017–2018	Succeeded by Jean-Henry Céant
