= Jean-Henry Céant =

Prime Minister of Haiti from 2018 to 2019

Jean Henry Céant
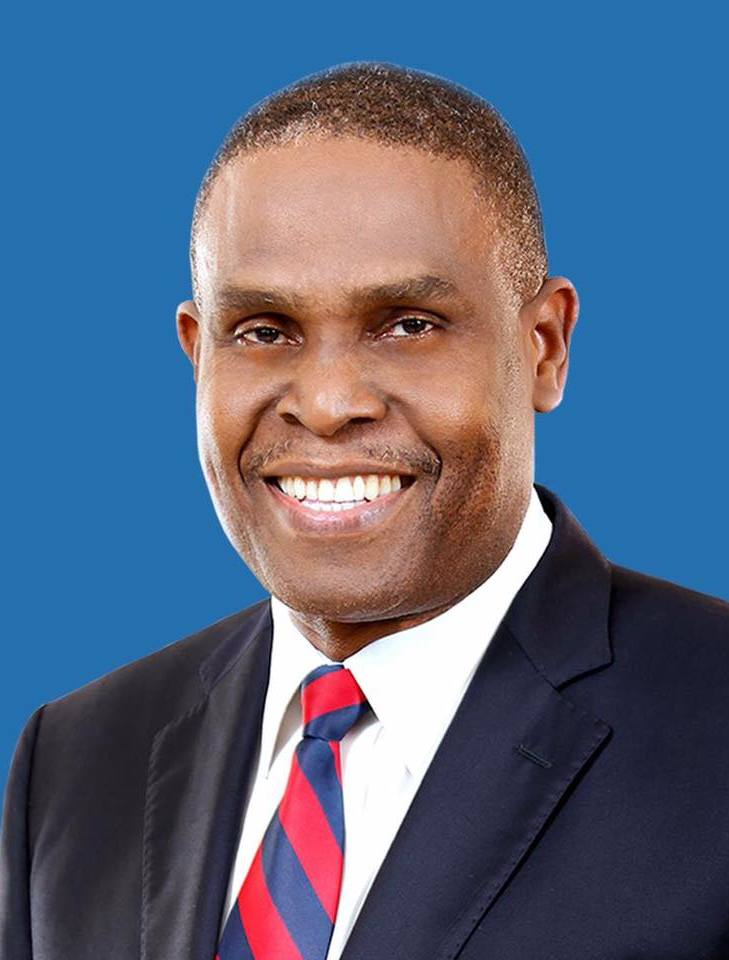
- Céant in 2018

21st Prime Minister of Haiti
- In office 17 September 2018 – 21 March 2019
- President: Jovenel Moïse
- Preceded by: Jack Guy Lafontant
- Succeeded by: Jean-Michel Lapin (acting)

President of Renmen Ayiti
- Incumbent
- Assumed office 2009
- Preceded by: Party established

Personal details
- Born: 27 September 1956 (age 70) Port-au-Prince, Haiti
- Party: Renmen Ayiti

Jean Henry Céant (born 27 September 1956) is a Haitian lawyer and politician who served as Prime Minister of Haiti from 2018 to 2019. The founder of Renmen Ayiti, he was sanctioned by the Canadian government for his involvement in human rights violations and supporting criminal gangs on 17 November 2022.

== Presidential campaigns ==
Céant ran for president of Haiti twice under the banner of his political party, Renmen Ayiti, in 2010 and 2015. In his first campaign, he came in fourth, with 8% of the vote, and in his second he finished sixth, with 2.5% of the vote.

Céant initially entered the 2026 presidential election as the candidate of Renmen Ayiti. However, on 31 August 2026, he announced that he was withdrawing his candidacy, citing political considerations and the impact of Canadian sanctions.

== Prime Minister ==
Céant was chosen by President Jovenel Moïse to become Prime Minister of Haiti in August 2018. He was chosen to succeed Jack Guy Lafontant, who had resigned due to an economic crisis. Céant is a notary by profession and was a presidential candidate in 2016. Ceant also leads a political organization called Renmen Ayiti.

On 18 March 2019, Céant's government was dissolved after a 93–6 vote of censuring the government and enacting a motion of no confidence.

== Canadian sanctions against Céant ==
On 17 November 2022, Canada imposed joint sanctions against Céant, former president Michel Martelly and former prime minister Laurent Lamothe for their alleged involvement in "gross and systematic human rights violations in Haiti." Céant is accused of supporting violent armed gangs in Haiti that terrorize the population.

The office of Canadian prime minister Justin Trudeau said that Céant is "suspected of protecting and enabling the illegal activities of armed criminal gangs.

Political offices
Preceded by Jack Guy Lafontant	Prime Minister of Haiti; 2018–2019	Succeeded by Jean-Michel Lapin
