= Jovenel Moïse =

President of Haiti from 2017 to 2021

- Moïse in 2018

48th President of Haiti
- In office 7 February 2017 – 7 July 2021
- Prime Minister: See list: Enex Jean-Charles Jack Guy Lafontant Jean-Henry Céant Jean-Michel Lapin (acting) Joseph Jouthe Claude Joseph (acting)
- Preceded by: Michel Martelly (Note: Evans Paul served as interim president between the end of Martelly's term to February 14 and Jocelerme Privert then served interim president afterwards until Moïse's inauguration.)
- Succeeded by: Edgard Leblanc Fils (as Chairman of the Transitional Presidential Council; 2024)

Personal details
- Born: 26 June 1968 Trou-du-Nord, Haiti
- Died: 7 July 2021 (aged 53) Pétion-Ville, Haiti
- Cause of death: Assassination by gunshot
- Resting place: Cap-Haïtien Cemetery
- Party: Tèt Kale
- Spouse: Martine Moïse (m. 1996)
- Children: 3
- Parent(s): Étienne Moïse (father); Lucia Bruno (mother)
- Education: Quisqueya University

Jovenel Moïse (French pronunciation: [ʒɔv(ə)nɛl mɔiz]; Haitian Creole pronunciation: [ʒovɛnɛl mɔiz]; 26 June 1968 – 7 July 2021) was a Haitian politician and businessman who served as the 48th president of Haiti from 2017 until his assassination in 2021. He assumed the presidency in February 2017 following his victory in the November 2016 Haitian presidential election.

Moïse's presidency coincided with a period of political instability in Haiti, including gang-related violence, civil unrest, fuel shortages and widespread lawlessness. On 7 July 2021, Moïse was shot and killed in a premeditated targeted attack.

== Early life and education ==
Jovenel Moïse was born on 26 June 1968 in Trou du Nord, Nord-Est. Moïse's father, Étienne Moïse, was a farmer and a mechanic, while his mother, Lucia Bruno, was a seamstress. Moïse, alongside his family, relocated to Port-au-Prince in July 1974, where he attended primary school at the École Nationale Don Durélin, secondary school at Lycée Toussaint Louverture, and the Centre Culturel du Collège Canado-Haïtien. Moïse pursued studies in political science at Quisqueya University with a particular focus on local governance and rural development.

In 1996, Moïse married Martine Marie Étienne Joseph, who was his classmate at the time. They left Port-au-Prince that year and settled in Port-de-Paix. After returning to rural Nord-Est, he advocated for rural development, proposing that Haiti address endemic poverty in part through an agrarian economy. Jovenel and Martine Moïse had three children: Jomarlie Moïse, Jovenel Moïse Jr., and Joverlein Moïse.

== Business career ==
In the mid-1990s, Moïse established JoMar Auto Parts, a company that sold automobile components. The following year, he started an organic banana plantation of more than 10 hectares (25 acres) in Haiti's Nord-Ouest department. In 2001, he worked with Culligan Water, an American water treatment company, to set up potable water filtration plants in the Nord-Ouest and Nord-Est departments. By 2004, Moïse joined the Northwest Chamber of Commerce and Industry (CCINO), later serving as its president.

In 2012, Moïse founded Agritrans SA to manage what was presented as Haiti's first agricultural free-trade zone, a 1,000-hectare (2,500-acre) banana plantation in the Nord-Est, known as the Nourribo Project. The project aimed to export bananas to Germany, which would have marked Haiti's first banana exports to the country since 1954, but only two containers were ultimately shipped.

The Haitian government granted Agritrans tax-free access to land, a 15-year exemption from income tax and customs duties on capital equipment, and a $6 million loan. Anonymous investors added at least $10 million. The company projected the creation of about 3,000 jobs, but by March 2015, only around 600 people had been employed.

== Political career ==
Moïse with Barbadian prime minister Mia Mottley, 4 July 2018

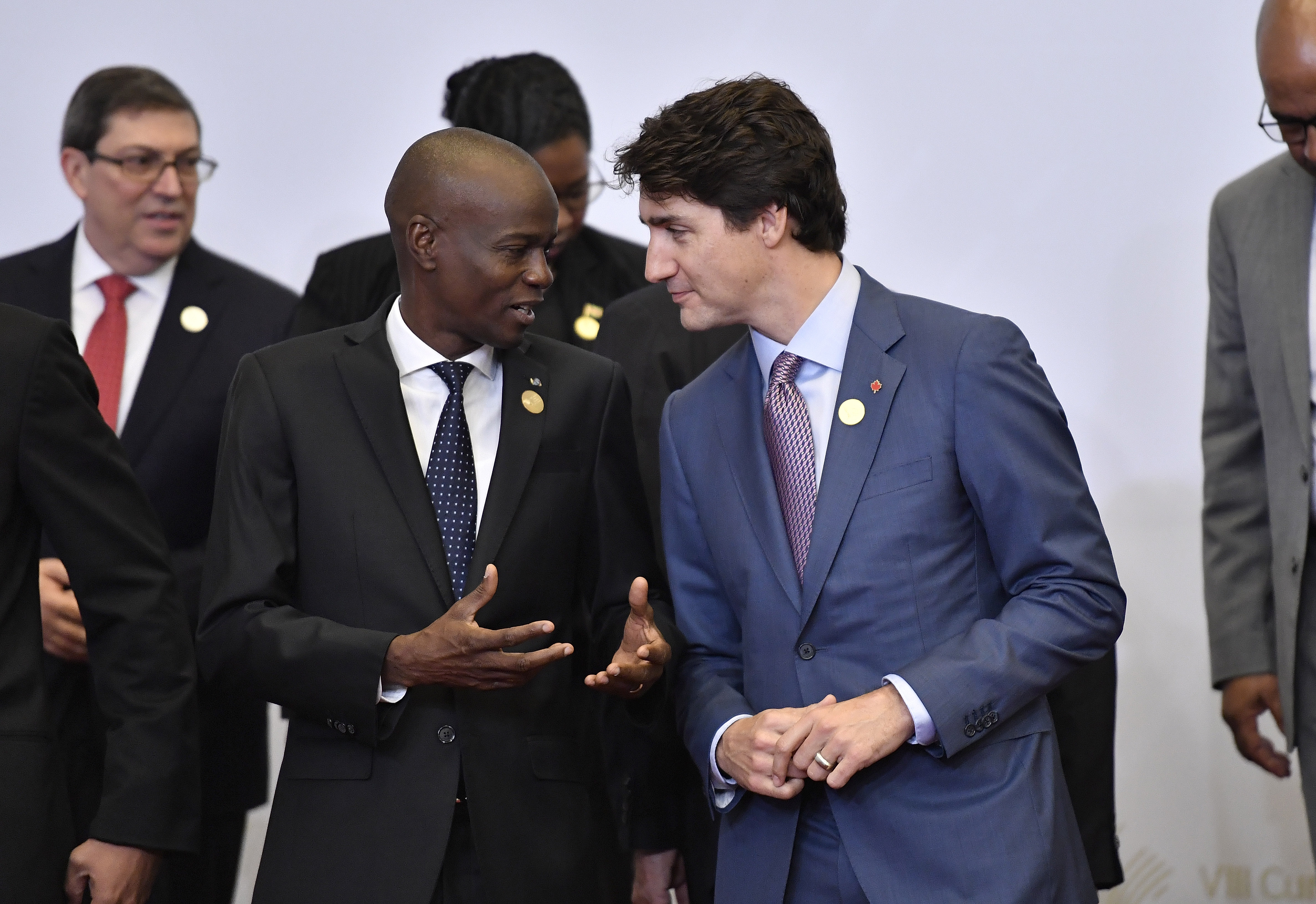
Moïse with Canadian Prime Minister Justin Trudeau in 2018

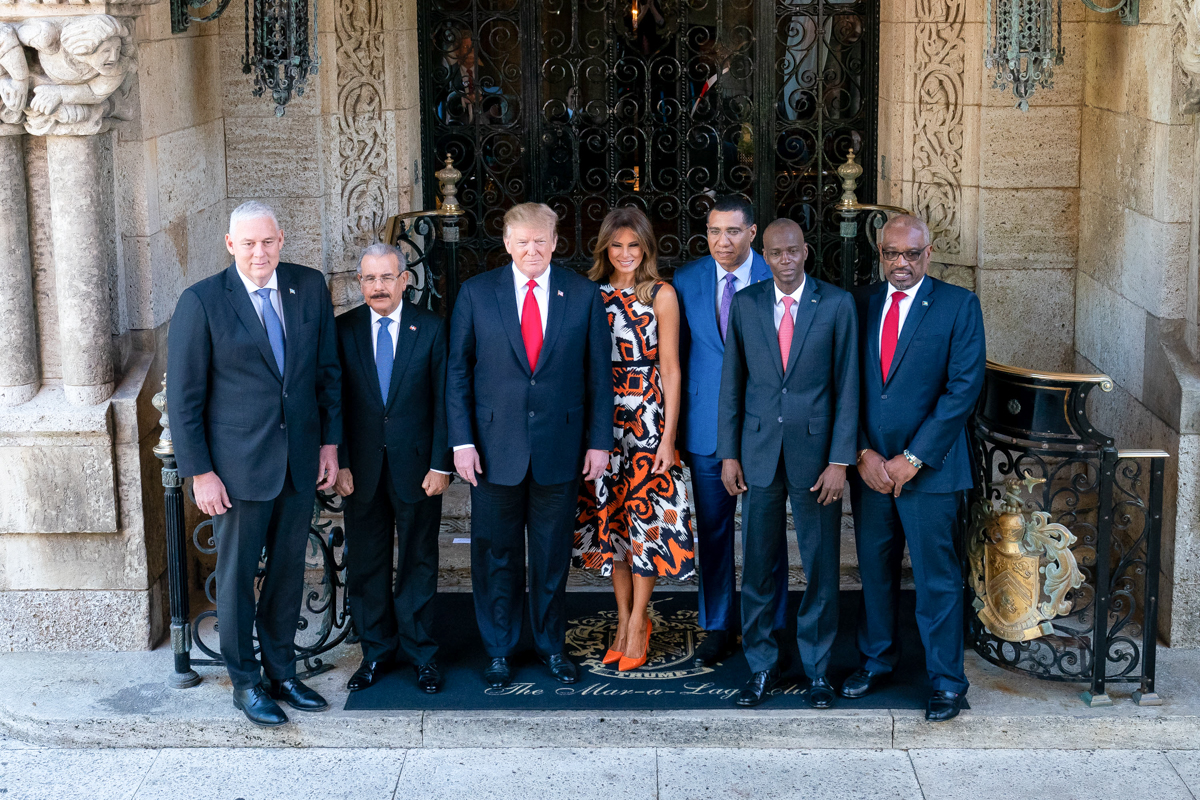
Moïse and other Caribbean leaders with U.S. President Donald Trump in Florida in 2019

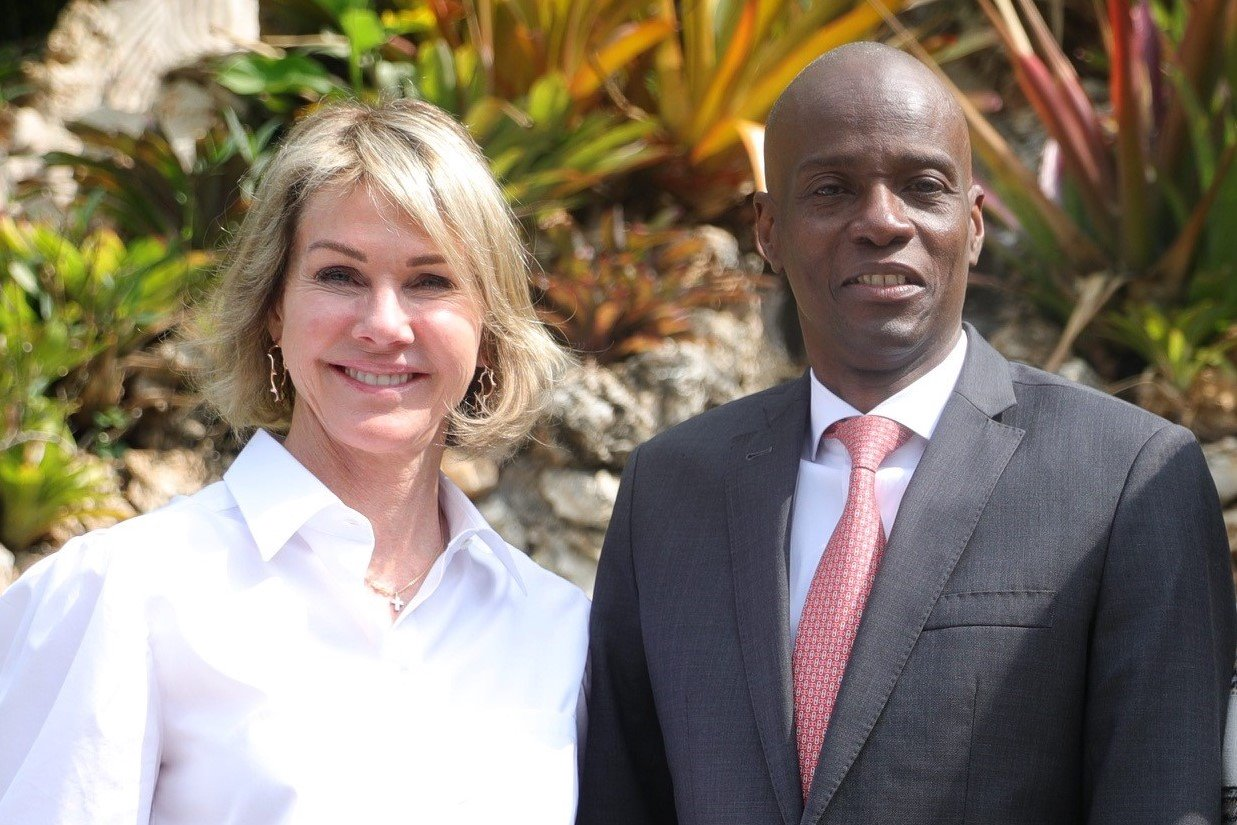
US Ambassador to the UN Kelly Craft, and President Moïse in 2019

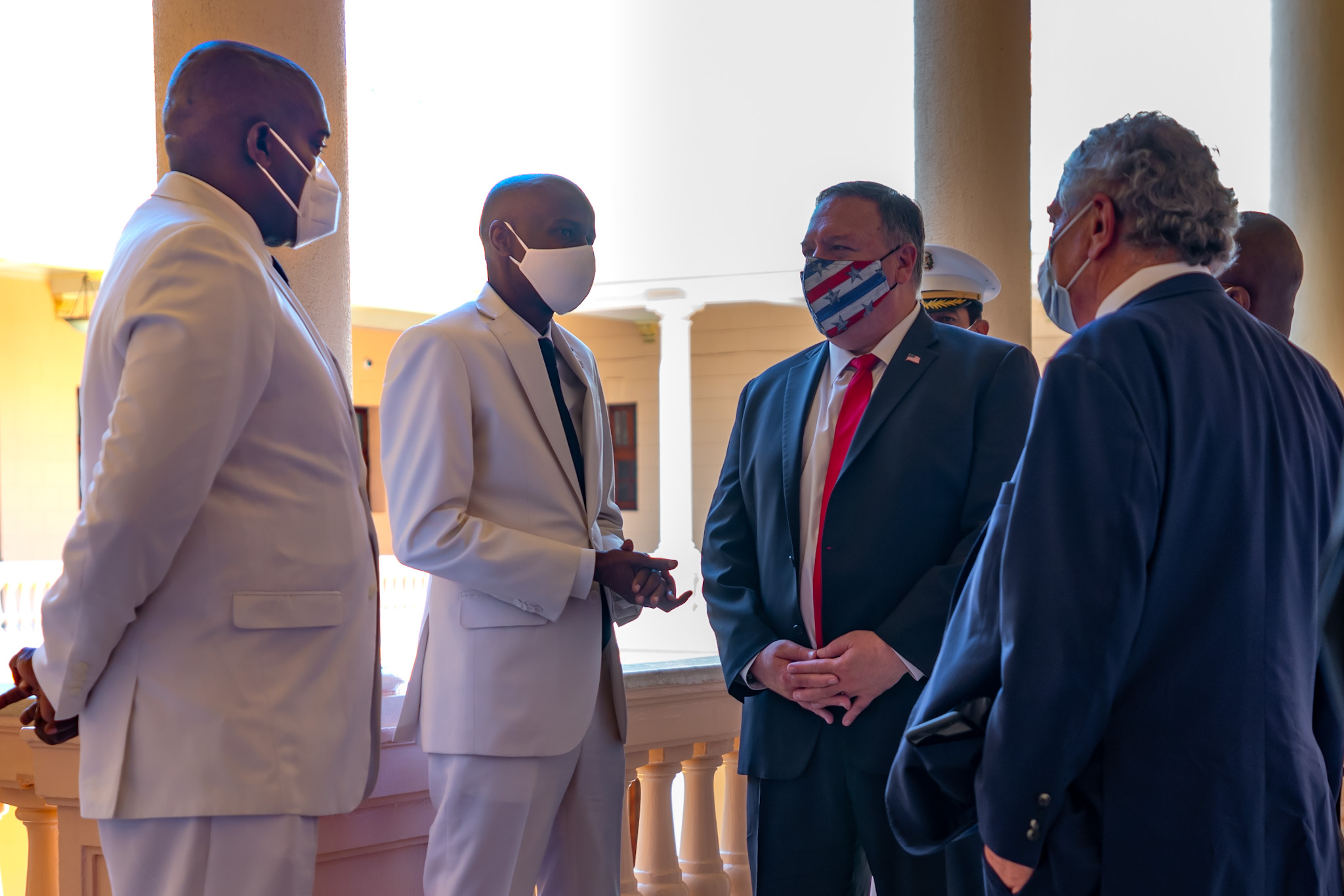
U.S. Secretary of State Mike Pompeo and President Moïse in 2020

In 2015, Haitian president Michel Martelly designated Moïse as the presidential candidate of the political party he had founded, the center-right Haitian Tèt Kale Party (PHTK). In his campaign, Moïse promoted biodynamic agriculture as a way to support Haiti, whose population was over 50% rural.

In the first round of the 2015 Haitian presidential elections, held on 25 October 2015, Moïse officially received 32.8% of the votes, resulting in a runoff election in which Moïse would be running against the runner-up of the first round, Jude Célestin. However, an exit poll conducted by the Haiti Sentinel reflected that Moïse had only received about 6% of the vote, and Célestin called the results fraudulent. As a result, thousands of people took to the streets in violent protests, forcing the postponement of the runoff election. In their wake, the 2015 ballot was ultimately annulled in June 2016. In February 2016, after President Michel Martelly's term ended, special elections were held by parliament and Jocelerme Privert was installed as interim president until new elections could be held.

On 20 November 2016, a new election was held. A week later, election officials declared, based on preliminary results, that Moïse had won the election with 55.67% of the vote and an estimated voter turnout of 21%, beating 26 other candidates—four of whom claimed victory before the official results were announced. Moïse secured the presidency without having to compete in a second-round election. In second, third and fourth place (respectively) were mechanical engineer Jude Célestin of LAPEH with 19.52%, leftist senator Jean-Charles Moïse of the Platfòm Pitit Dessalines (PPD) with 11.04% and Maryse Narcisse of Fanmi Lavalas (FL) with 8.99%. Jovenel Moïse was sworn in on 7 February 2017 for a five-year term.

Political opponents claimed that Moïse's five-year presidential term should have expired on 7 February 2021, five years after the conclusion of Michel Martelly's term following the disputed 2015 election. Moïse, however, maintained that his term commenced with his official inauguration on 7 February 2017 and would therefore end in 2022.

In November 2019, Moïse met with U.S. Ambassador to the United Nations Kelly Craft, to discuss the methods necessary to resolve Haiti's political crisis through inclusive dialogue. Craft later met with several political leaders from other parties and urged an inclusive solution with Moïse.

== Presidency ==
=== Agriculture ===
During his presidency, Moïse's policies focused on agricultural and water infrastructure development in rural Haiti. In May 2021, he inaugurated the Marion hydroelectric dam in the Nord-Est department, which became the second-largest dam in the country. The project was intended to supply electricity and irrigation for approximately 10,000 hectares of farmland. Moïse also supported the restoration of the Tannerie reservoir and promoted the use of solar-powered pumping stations in the Artibonite region to boost rice cultivation. Before his assassination, he had initiated efforts to divert water from the Dajabón River for agricultural use.

=== Other infrastructure ===
Moïse's infrastructure advancement was mainly focused in the two cities of Jeremie and Port-de-Paix, where he installed roads like the Carrefour Joffre/Anse-à-Foleur and the Carrefour Trois-Rivières. He also rebuilt the airport in Jérémie and constructed power plants to provide electricity to numerous small towns, including Jérémie and Port-de-Paix. Asphalt plants in several provinces in Haiti, including in Gros Mornes, Les Cayes, and Trou-du-Nord, were built under Moïse's rule.

=== Controversies ===
Moïse received several allegations of corruption, including allegedly taking bribes for road-building projects and improperly awarding a contract to sell goats to the Haitian government. These allegations, coupled with a declining quality of life for Haitian citizens throughout his administration, led to mass demonstrations that sought his resignation.

== Electoral history ==
=== 2015 presidential election ===
2015 Haitian presidential election
Party	Candidate	Votes	%
PHTK	Jovenel Moïse	508,761	32.81
LAPEH	Jude Célestin	392,782	25.27
Platfòm Pitit Desalin	Jean-Charles Moïse	222,109	14.27
Fanmi Lavalas	Maryse Narcisse	108,844	7.05
Mouvement Action Socialiste	Eric Jean Baptiste	56,427	3.63
Other parties	Other candidates	242,047	15.58
Against all	Against all	22,161	1.42

As no candidate received more than 50% of the vote, a second round was mandated by law. However, this was repeatedly postponed and eventually cancelled, with an interim president appointed indirectly by the legislature in the February 2016 Haitian presidential election and fresh elections scheduled for 2016.

=== November 2016 presidential election ===
November 2016 Haitian presidential election
Party	Candidate	Votes	%
PHTK	Jovenel Moïse	590,927	55.60
LAPEH	Jude Célestin	207,988	19.57
Platfòm Pitit Desalin	Jean-Charles Moïse	117,349	11.04
Fanmi Lavalas	Maryse Narcisse	95,765	9.01
Renmen Ayiti	Jean-Henry Céant	8,014	0.75
Other parties	Other candidates	35,593	3.18
Against all	Against all	7,203	0.68

With more than 50% of votes cast, Moïse was elected in the first round.

== Assassination ==
Around 1:00 AM EDT (5:00 UTC) on 7 July 2021, 11 days after his 53rd birthday, Moïse was shot dead when gunmen attacked his residence in Pèlerin 5, a district of Pétion-Ville. His wife Martine, the first lady of Haiti, was airlifted to Jackson Memorial Hospital in Miami to be treated for wounds sustained during the attack. Their three children were unharmed, as two hid successfully and one was not present. A press release issued later that day from the office of acting Prime Minister Claude Joseph blamed the attack on "a group of unidentified individuals, some of whom spoke in Spanish." On 10 July, Martine Moïse posted a statement on her Twitter account, urging Haitians not to let her late husband's contributions go to waste.

In December 2021, The New York Times reported that Moïse's assassination might have been linked to his efforts to curb narcotics trafficking and publicly expose high-ranking Haitian officials involved in the drug trade.

Ariel Henry, who had been selected as the acting prime minister by Moïse shortly before his assassination, was later accused by several officials of being connected to Joseph Felix Badio, an alleged mastermind of the assassination, and being involved in the planning. Another of the alleged masterminds, Rodolphe Jaar, also stated that Henry was close to Badio and had protected him after the assassination. Judge Garry Orélien, who was previously the top judicial official in Haiti overseeing the case, stated that Henry was friends with Badio and planned the assassination with him. Henry resigned in 2024 following mass protests demanding that he abandon his de facto governance as head of state.

On 20 February 2024, the Associated Press reported that Haiti's investigating judge had indicted several suspects in Moïse's murder, including his widow Martine, former acting prime minister Joseph, and former police chief Léon Charles. The indictment was overturned on 13 October 2025 following an appeal.

Colombian President Gustavo Petro apologized on behalf of Colombia to Haiti in 2025 for the involvement of former Colombian soldiers in the assassination. His successor, Abelardo de la Espriella, changed course and announced in 2026 that the Colombian state will provide legal assistance to the mercenaries facing prosecution in the United States and financial assistance to their families.

== Legacy ==
Although some praised his proposed reforms, Moïse faced significant criticism during his presidency and following his assassination. He was widely accused of attempting to alter the constitution to consolidate government power and extend his presidency. In 2019, he was accused of embezzlement in relation to an investigation into PetroCaribe funds. Moise was denounced by human rights organization for criminalizing common forms of protest and creating an intelligence agency to provide surveillance of the political opposition. A report by the International Human Rights Clinic at Harvard Law School found his government complicit in systematically employing violent gangs to suppress political demonstrations and opposition, including planning, executing and covering up of deadly massacres that amounted to crimes against humanity. The report stated that Moïse's failure to stop or respond to attacks initiated by his subordinates may have made him liable for crimes against humanity. Conversely, he also received commendation for his initiatives aimed at curbing corruption and his willingness to dismantle monopolies, as well as his efforts to challenge oligarchs and members of the Haitian elite.

President Moïse and former president Michel Martelly, both affiliated with the same political party, encountered substantial opposition and criticism during their respective administrations, primarily in connection with corruption and alleged associations with influential Haitian gangs.

== Honors ==
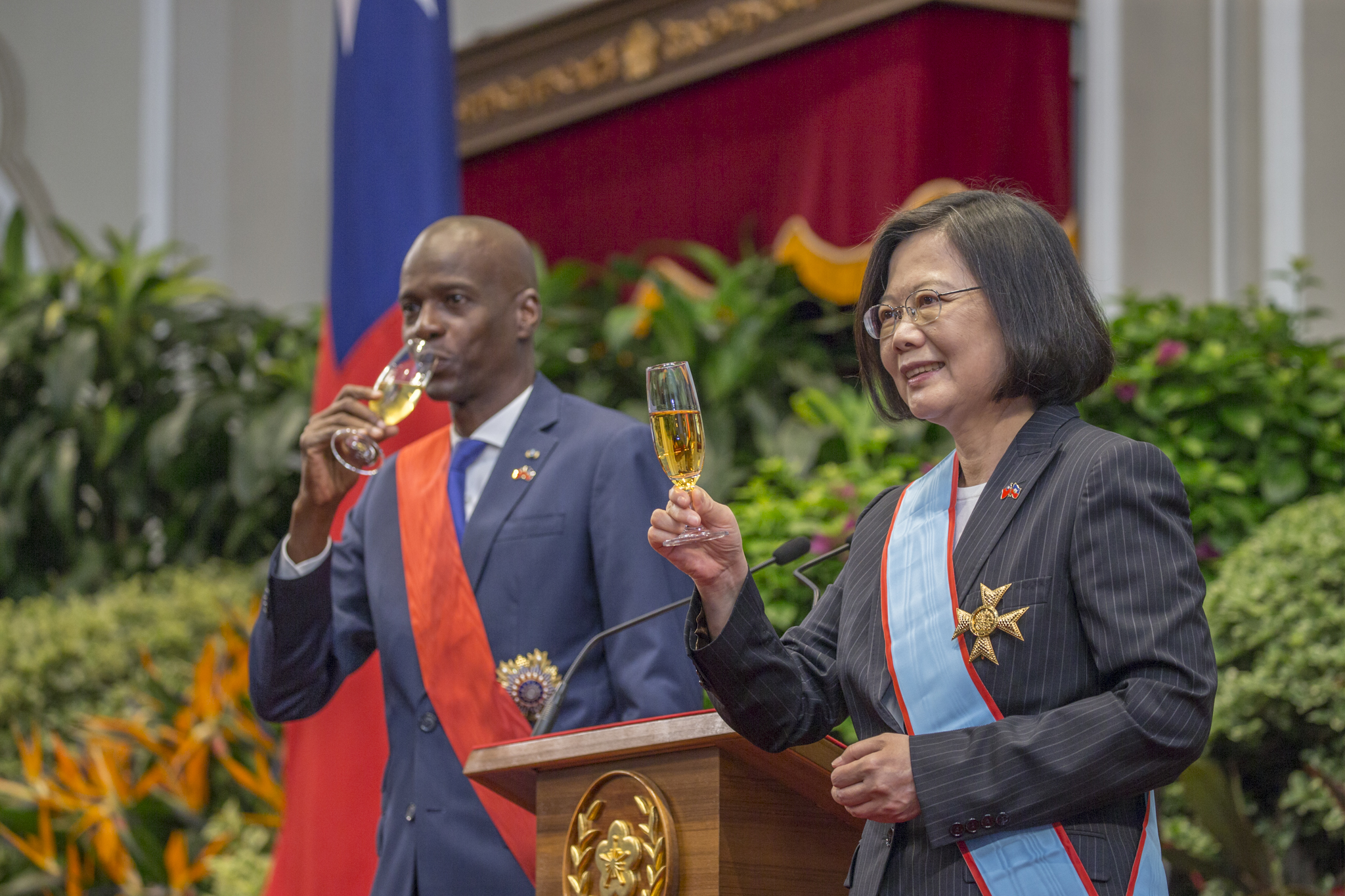
Moïse receiving the Order of Brilliant Jade at a ceremony held by Taiwanese President Tsai Ing-wen in 2018

Moïse was awarded the Order of Brilliant Jade with Grand Cordon by Taiwanese president Tsai Ing-wen in May 2018. Tsai commended the economic initiatives undertaken by Moïse's government.

== See also ==
- List of assassinated and executed heads of state and government
- List of heads of state and government who died in office
- List of heads of state of Haiti
- Vilbrun Guillaume Sam, another Haitian president who was assassinated (1915)

== Notes ==
Political offices
Preceded by Jocelerme Privert; Interim	President of Haiti; 2017–2021	Vacant Title next held by Edgard Leblanc Fils as Chairman of the Transitional Presidential Council
