= Prime Minister of Haiti =

Head of government

Prime Minister of the Republic of Haiti
- Premier Ministre d'Haïti (French); Premye Minis Ayiti (Haitian Creole)
- Flag of Haiti

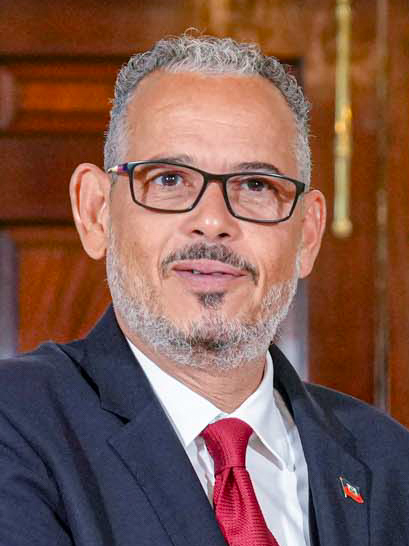
- Incumbent; Alix Didier Fils-Aimé; Acting since 10 November 2024
- Executive branch of the Government of Haiti
- Style: His/Her Excellency
- Status: Head of government Head of state (de facto) (7 July 2021 – 24 April 2024; since 7 February 2026)
- Member of: Council of Ministers
- Seat: Port-au-Prince, Haiti
- Appointer: President
- Inaugural holder: Martial Célestin
- Formation: 9 February 1988
- Website: primature.gouv.ht

The prime minister of Haiti (French: Premier ministre d'Haïti, Haitian Creole: Premye Minis Ayiti) is the head of government of Haiti. The office was created under the Constitution of 1987; previously, all executive power was held by the president or head of state, who appointed and chaired the Council of Ministers. The office is currently held by Alix Didier Fils-Aimé who has been serving as acting prime minister since 10 November 2024.

== Appointment ==
The prime minister is appointed by the president and ratified by the National Assembly.

== Duties and powers ==
The prime minister appoints the ministers and secretaries of state by consulting with the president, and goes before the National Assembly to obtain a vote of confidence for their declaration of general policy. The prime minister enforces the laws and, along with the president, is responsible for national defense. In addition, the prime minister oversees the National Commission on Government Procurement (CNMP), a decentralized body.

== Records ==
Gérard Latortue served the longest time as prime minister for a total of 1,550 days in office. Jacques-Édouard Alexis served the second-longest time in office. He held the position for 1,526 days during his two terms, and was the longest-serving prime minister appointed to the position by an elected president.

== See also ==
- List of prime ministers of Haiti
- President of Haiti
- List of heads of state of Haiti
