= Rouzier =

Rouzier is a surname. Notable people with the surname include:

- Antonin Rouzier (born 1986), French volleyball player
- Daniel Rouzier (born 1960), Haitian tycoon
- Fabrice Rouzier (born 1967), Haitian pianist, producer, and entrepreneur
- Gérard Raoul Rouzier, Haitian lawyer
- Marilise Neptune Rouzier (born 1945), Haitian biologist

== See also ==
- Rouziers, Cantal, France
- Rouziers-de-Touraine, Indre-et-Loire, France
