= Institution Saint-Louis de Gonzague =

Private school in Haiti

Coordinates: 18°33′20.83″N 72°18′8.31″W

- Delmas 31, Delmas, Haiti

Information
- Type: Private
- Motto: "Dieu Seul " (French) (To God Only)
- Religious affiliation: Roman Catholic
- Established: 1890
- Principal: Fr. Simon
- Grades: 1 to 13
- Gender: Boys
- Age: 6 to 19
- Language: French
- Color: Green Red

Institution Saint-Louis de Gonzague is a primary and secondary Roman Catholic school in Port-au-Prince, Haiti. It was founded and is run by the Brothers of Christian Instruction (FIC) (Frères de l'instruction chrétienne de Ploërmel). The school colors are red and green

== History ==
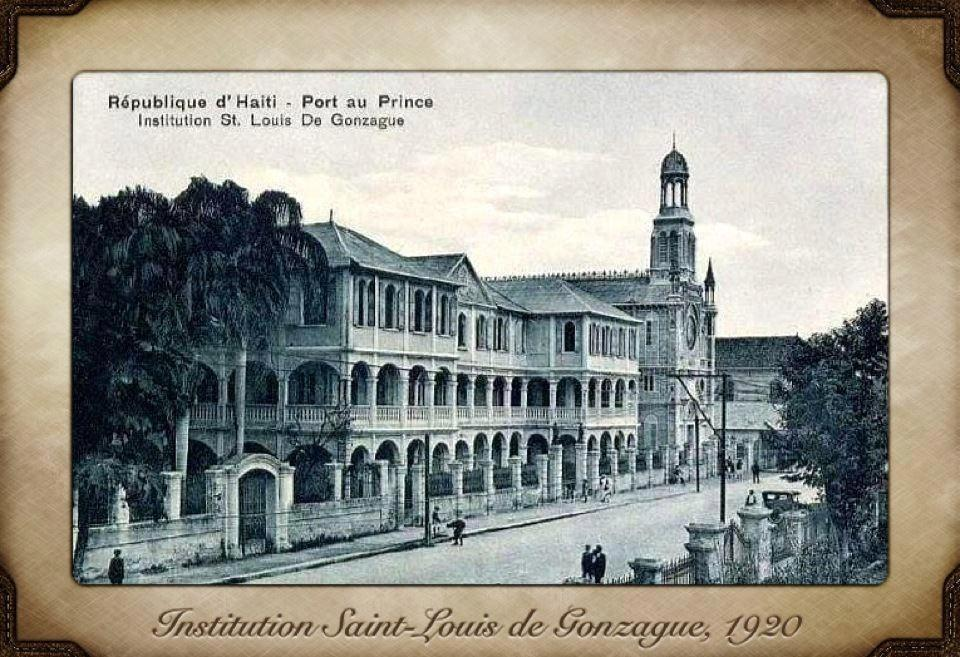
Saint Louis rue due Centre, 1920

Secondary campus, 2004

Considered among the most prestigious schools in Haiti, it was founded in 1890 and initially located at rue du Centre, in downtown Port-au-Prince for children 6 to 12. By 1930, Saint-Louis de Gonzague offered degrees for secondary school. In the early 1970s, Saint-Louis de Gonzague engaged in a major expansion. The director at that time, Brother Ephrem Le-Mat, built a new campus on previously acquired land in the suburb of Delmas. Since then, the secondary school has moved to that new campus.

The primary school has an enrollment of about 400 students. Each of the six grades has three sections. After the 2010 Haiti earthquake, the primary school moved to the Delmas campus, as the secondary school still is.

The secondary school is composed of seven grades with about 1000 students divided into two sections, Third Cycle (Troisième Cycle) and Secondary School (Secondaire). Students are arranged in different sections per grade: blue, yellow, purple, red, or green. The seventh and the eight grades currently have 5 classes of all colors. The ninth and tenth (neuvieme, troisieme) grades have 4 classes (purple is dropped). The eleventh, twelfth and thirteenth (Seconde, Rhéto, Philo) generally have three classes (yellow is dropped). Students are required to choose a section (B, C or D) when they reach the eleventh grade. These sections are used for national exams, Haitian Baccalauréat. The group is usually shrunk from 250 students in seventh grade to 100 in the final grade.

In 1998, the FIC decided to share the directing roles with non-religious members of the school. S. Roger Legagneur and Mona B. Anthony have held managerial roles in the secondary school until 2009. The institution then returned to a religious-only management. Brother Charles Coutard is the principal of the secondary school, and Brother Ewald Guerrier is the principal for the primary school. The school is known for its tough grading.

== 2010 earthquake ==
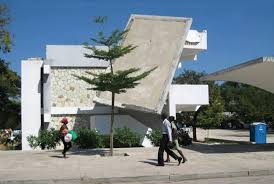
Damaged school after 2010 earthquake

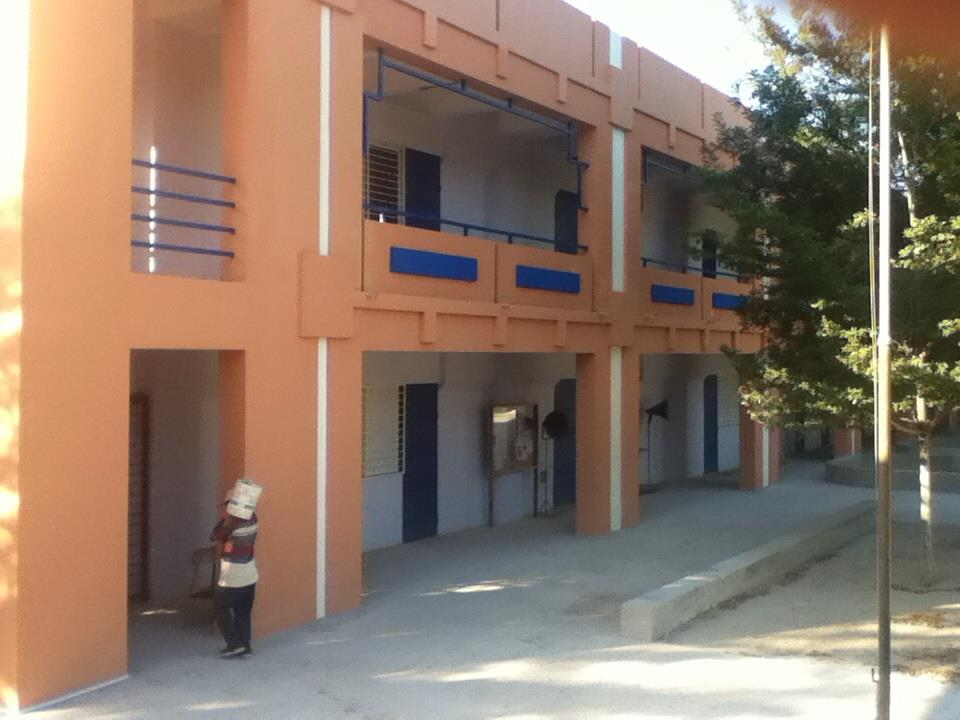
Post earthquake, 2013

On 12 January, Port-au-Prince was hit by an earthquake. Saint-Louis Gonzague buildings suffered severe damages. The location in the city center of Port-au-Prince was completely destroyed. The Third Cycle building was severely damaged, and deemed not suited for reconstruction. The Secondary school building had minor damages comparatively but was not suitable for hosting students. The school was the site of shelter of more than 10,000 persons for more than 6 months.

From 2010 to 2012, students from all classes attended school under tents at the Delmas 31 campus. In the Fall of 2012, the Secondary classes returned in their old location. In March 2014, Third cycle classes returned inside constructed buildings. Primary school classes returned inside concrete buildings located in the Delmas campus in April 2014.

== Past head principals ==
- 2024–Present: Fr. Géniaud Lauture
- 2022–2024: Fr. Simon Alphonse
- 2020–2022: Fr. Milot Frédérique
- 2017–2020: Fr. Valmyr Dabel
- 2013–2017: Fr. Charles Coutard
- 2010–2013: Fr. Dufreine Auguste
- 2004–2010: Fr. Joseph Bellanger
- 1998–2004: Fr. Charles Coutard
- 1992–1998: Fr. Joseph Bellanger
- 1986–1992: Fr. Serge Larose

== Notable alumni ==
- André Apaid, businessman, Leader of the civil society movement Group of 184
- Kervin Bristol, professional basketball player in Europe
- Eliezer Cadet, Garveyite observer at the Paris Peace Conference
- Jean-Claude Duvalier, son of François Duvalier, President of Haiti from 1971 to 1986
- Gary Klang, Haitian-Canadian poet and novelist
- Laurent Lamothe, CEO of Global Voice Group and former prime minister
- Ludovic Lamothe, Haitian composer and virtuoso pianist, considered one of Haiti's most important classical composers
- Leslie Manigat, former President of Haiti
- Michel Joseph Martelly, former President of Haiti
- Charlemagne Péralte, Haitian nationalist leader who opposed the US invasion of Haiti
- Jacques Roumain, writer, politician, and founder of the Haitian Communist Party
- Daniel Rouzier, businessman and author
- Fabrice Rouzier, musician and CEO of SUN Auto
- Maurice Sixto, Haitian humorist and raconteur
