= 2022 Haitian fuel protests =

Crisis involving fuel centered in Port-au-Prince

2022 Haitian crisis
- Part of the Haitian crisis (2018–present)
- Date: 14 September 2022 – 6 November 2022
- Location: Haiti
- Caused by: Rising taxes on gasoline, diesel, and kerosene, and the 2022 global energy crisis; Corruption and impunity in the Haitian government; Poor living conditions, widespread outbreak of cholera and acute hunger; Police brutality, human rights abuses, and violence against protesters; Armed gang violence and blockade of the Varreux fuel depot
- Goals: Resignation of Ariel Henry
- Result: Lifting of blockade of Varreux fuel terminal by G9 Family and Allies; Protests against the cost of living crisis continue

Parties
Haiti; Military support: United States; Mexico; Canada	Anti-government protesters	Armed gangs; G9 Family and Allies; numerous other gangs

Lead figures
(Haiti) Ariel Henry		(Haiti) Jimmy Chérizier

The socioeconomic and political crisis in Haiti has been marked by rising energy prices due to the 2022 global energy crisis, as well as protests, and civil unrest against the government of Haiti, armed gang violence, an outbreak of cholera, shortages of fuel and clean drinking water, as well as widespread acute hunger. It is a continuation of instability and protests that began in 2018.

Following the assassination of Haiti's then-president, Jovenel Moïse, on 7 July 2021, Ariel Henry assumed the office of acting prime minister on 20 July. In September 2022, Henry announced that the government would be ending fuel subsidies and that the price of petroleum products would be increasing; this led to protests, including a demonstration in Port-au-Prince that escalated to a riot days later. In response to the government, a federation of over a dozen gangs (known as the G9 Family and Allies) blockaded the Varreux fuel terminal, the country's largest fuel depot. The blockade and the surrounding unrest led to the temporary closure of foreign embassies in Haiti, as well as resource shortages, hospital service reductions, school closures, and workers being unable to commute to work.

On 11 October 2022, Henry and his cabinet requested the deployment of foreign troops to oppose the gangs and anti-government demonstrations in Port-au-Prince. On 15 October, the United States and Mexico sent armored vehicles and military equipment to aid the Haitian government. On 21 October, the United Nations Security Council voted unanimously to approve sanctions on Haiti, namely an asset freeze, travel bans and arms embargo, aimed at the country's armed gangs.

On 6 November 2022, following two weeks of negotiations with the Haitian government as well as an offensive launched by the Haitian National Police, the G9 gang coalition relinquished control of the Varreux fuel terminal, with G9 leader Jimmy "Barbecue" Chérizier formally announcing an end to the fuel blockade.

== Background ==
Protests began in cities throughout Haiti on 7 July 2018 in response to increased fuel prices. Over time, these protests evolved into demands for the resignation of Jovenel Moïse, the then-president of Haiti. Led by opposition politician Jean-Charles Moïse, protesters stated that their goal is to create a transitional government, provide social programs, and prosecute allegedly corrupt officials. Throughout 2019, 2020, and 2021, hundreds of thousands took part in protests calling for the government to resign. On 7 February 2021, supporters of the opposition against the then-incumbent Jovenel Moïse allegedly attempted a coup d'état, leading to 23 arrests, as well as clashes between protestors and police.

On 7 July 2021, president Jovenel Moïse was assassinated, allegedly by a group of 28 foreign mercenaries; three of the suspected assassins were killed and 20 arrested, while a manhunt for the masterminds of the attack remains ongoing. After the acting prime minister, Claude Joseph, stepped down, Ariel Henry was sworn in as his replacement on 20 July 2021. Protestors and civil rights advocates in Haiti have argued that Henry's status as prime minister is illegitimate.

== Protests, blockades and gang violence ==
=== Timeline ===
==== September–October 2022 ====
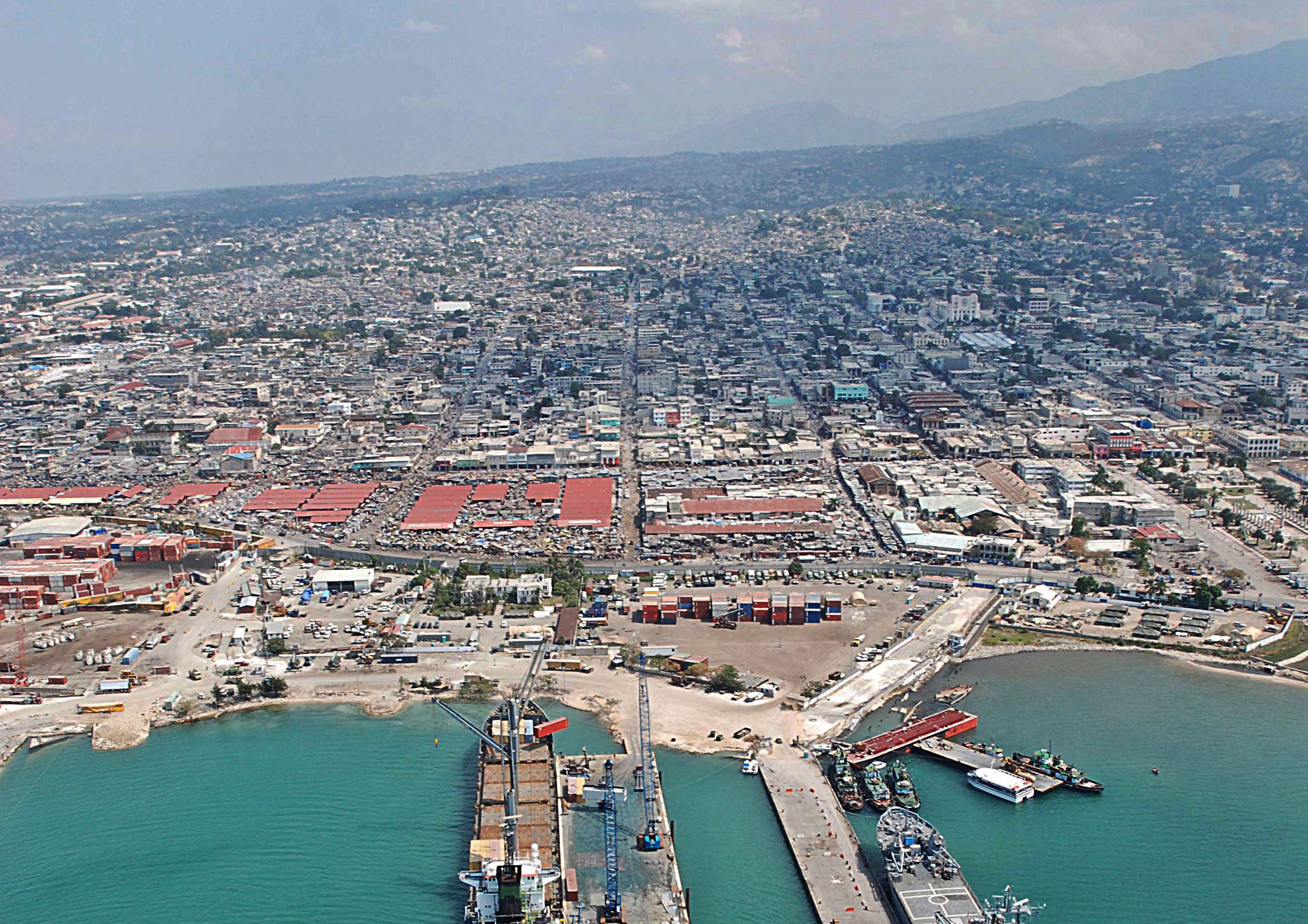
Aerial view of Port-au-Prince, 2010

Protests erupted in Haiti on 14 September 2022 in response to rising energy prices and the rising cost of living. Following an announcement by the acting prime minister of Haiti, Ariel Henry, on 11 September that the government would be ending fuel subsidies and that the price of petroleum products would be increasing, demonstrations in the capital city of Port-au-Prince escalated to a riot on 14 September. Protests caused various institutions to temporarily close, including the embassies of Spain and France, and banks. Some protesters also attacked the homes of politicians (including the home of opposition leader André Michel), businesses, and looted UNICEF warehouses containing humanitarian aid. The United Nations stated that they lost $6,000,000 worth of supplies.

On 12 September, a federation of over a dozen gangs (known as the G9 Family and Allies) responded by digging trenches and placing cargo containers as barriers on the road to the Varreux fuel terminal—Haiti's largest fuel depot, where 70% of the country's fuel is stored—in Port-au-Prince's Cité Soleil area, blockading it. They demanded that Henry resign and that the government reduce prices for fuel and basic goods. Inflation in Haiti had recently risen around 30 percent, exacerbating the situation. The blockade has caused many gas stations to close; water delivery companies and waste collection services to cease operation; hospitals to reduce services; schools to close; grocery stores and banks to struggle; workers to be unable to commute to work; blackouts; and loss of cell phone service. As a result, there is a shortage of fuel and clean drinking water. As of 4 October 2022, a gallon of gas on the black market cost around $30–40. Gangs are powerful in Haiti, with the United Nations estimating that gangs control around 40 percent of Port-au-Prince.

On 25 October, PBS NewsHour foreign affairs and defense correspondent Nick Schifrin reported from Haiti that, in a hospital operated by the humanitarian non-governmental organization (NGO) Médecins Sans Frontières (also known as Doctors Without Borders, or MSF), over one-quarter of patients are gunshot victims injured by armed gangs. That same day, Roberson Alphonse, a journalist for the Port-au-Prince-based newspaper Le Nouvelliste, was hospitalized after being shot in his car while commuting to work. On 30 October, Radio Tele Unique videographer Romelo Vilsaint was among a group who demanded the release of fellow journalist Robest Dimanche, a reporter for Radio Zenith who was detained while covering a protest; police opened fire and threw tear gas at the group, and Vilsaint was struck in the head by a tear gas canister and killed. Vilsaint's death sparked further protests.

Additionally, kidnappings occur "in broad daylight", with some gang members kidnapping Haitians from their cars and holding them for ransom.

==== November 2022 ====
In the mid-morning hours of 3 November 2022, the Haitian National Police launched an operation to confront the G9 gang coalition blockading the Varreux fuel terminal, resulting in heavy gunfire. The next day, police were reported to have taken control of the terminal, and were in the process of clearing the roads. According to Reuters, drone images of the entrance to the terminal appeared to show that access had been made clear.

On 5 November 2022, Fritz Dorilas, host of the program Le droit, la loi et la justice (The law and justice) for Radio Télé Megastar, was fatally shot near his home in Port-au-Prince. He is at least the eighth Haitian journalist murdered so far this year.

On 6 November, following two weeks of negotiation between the Haitian government and the G9 Family and Allies, Jimmy Chérizier (known locally by his alias "Babekyou", or "Barbecue"), a former police officer and the leader of G9 gang coalition, formally announced an end to the two-month blockade of the Varreux fuel terminal. In a video circulating online, Chérizier stated, "Once again, the drivers and employees of the Varreux terminal can come down without fear. We've decided among us [...] to allow for the gas to be released." He also asserted that the G9 Family and Allies have not been in negotiation with Henry, despite claims by some politicians to the contrary, and said of the gangs' actions: "This is a fight for a better life. The situation has worsened. [...] We are not responsible for what happened to the country."

The following day, the U.S. Department of State announced reward offers of up to US$1,000,000 each for information leading to the arrest or conviction of three Haitian gang leaders—Lanmò Sanjou, also known as Joseph Wilson; Jermaine Stephenson, or Gaspiyay; and Vitel'Homme Innocent—for their roles in the abduction of a group of Christian missionaries near Port-au-Prince in 2021.

On 9 November 2022, Agence France Presse reported that fuel distribution in Haiti has resumed, with at least 45 tanker trucks of fuel having left the terminal under police escort, en route to factories, hospitals and public facilities. Gas stations reopened in Port-au-Prince on 12 November to excitement in the streets, with tap tap drivers and other Haitian residents pushing their vehicles to the nearest gas station to refuel them.

On 14 November, Henry dismissed Justice Minister Berto Dorcé, as well as the Haitian government's interior minister and its government commissioner. Henry has become Haiti's interior minister in the interim while still serving as prime minister, and Emmelie Prophète Milcé was appointed justice minister. That same day, armed individuals fired shots at a U.S. Embassy convoy composed of vehicles belonging to the U.S. Embassy and Haitian National Police, as well as commercial vehicles. A Haitian driver was injured, but no police or embassy personnel were reported harmed. A local media report and an anonymous security source attributed the attack to the 400 Mawozo gang.

== Cholera outbreak and hunger ==
An outbreak of cholera in Haiti was reported in October 2022, following a period of three years without a new confirmed case of the disease in the country. The current spread of the disease has been attributed to overcrowded prisons, gang-run slums, and a lack of clean drinking water. On 2 October, Moha Zemrag, a project coordinator for MSF, stated that the majority of Haitian cholera patients currently under observation by MSF are children. By 12 October, the Pan American Health Organization (PAHO) reported at least 35 official deaths from cholera, as well as 600 suspected cases in the areas surrounding Port-au-Prince. On 30 October, Haiti's Ministry of Health reported that the numbers had risen to 55 deaths and 2,243 suspected cases. By 9 November, the ministry reported that the cholera death toll had risen to 136.

Additionally, the World Food Programme (WFP) reported on 14 October that a record 4.7 million people (almost half of the country's population) are currently facing acute hunger in Haiti; using the Integrated Food Security Phase Classification (IPC) scale, the WFP classified 19,000 of those people as belonging to the fifth and highest level on the scale, the "Catastrophe" phase (IPC 5).

== Political events ==
On 11 October, Henry and 18 members of his cabinet requested the deployment of foreign troops to oppose the gangs in Port-au-Prince, as well as demonstrators who are demanding Henry's resignation and protesting rising fuel prices. On 15 October, Canada and the United States supported the Henry administration with armored vehicles and military equipment. António Guterres, the secretary-general of the United Nations, called for "armed action" to depose the fuel blockade. Linda Thomas-Greenfield, the U.S. Ambassador to the United Nations, stated that, "If there was ever a moment to come to the aid of Haitians in dire need, it is now," adding that, "To be clear, we are keenly aware of the history of international intervention in Haiti and specifically of concerns about the council authorizing a response that could lead to an open-ended peacekeeping role." Some Haitian citizens familiar with the poor record of past interventions have expressed opposition to the prospect of a foreign military force being sent to the country, while others are more supportive of the notion on the basis of the possibility of a resolution to the shortages and widespread presence of gangs and cholera. Rosy Auguste Ducena, a lawyer and programme director at the National Network for the Defense of Human Rights (RNDDH) in Haiti, stated that, "History has shown us more than once that foreign forces bring us more problems than solutions."

On 17 October, the U.S. and Mexico called for the formation of a non-UN international force to depose the gangs in Port-au-Prince, proposing "a limited, carefully scoped, non-U.N. mission led by a partner country with the deep, necessary experience required for such an effort to be effective".

On 21 October, the UN Security Council voted unanimously to approve sanctions on Haiti, allowing for the imposition of an asset freeze, travel ban, and arms embargo, against threats to the peace or stability of the country, namely Chérizier.

A proposal by the U.S. to deploy an international military force to Haiti has received little support from other UN member countries. Despite their provision of vehicles and military equipment to Haiti, the U.S. and Canada have not volunteered their own armed forces, with Canada repeatedly expressing hesitation at the prospect of doing so. Russia and China have also openly expressed concerns regarding such a deployment, and France rejected the notion of deploying French troops to the country. The Bahamas has said that it could send soldiers or police if requested. Despite no countries offering to lead a military force, on 26 October, Brian A. Nichols, U.S. Assistant Secretary of State for Western Hemisphere Affairs, stated, "I strongly disagree with the idea that a resolution authorizing a multinational force is in peril," adding that, "I'm confident that we will have something early in November, both a resolution and leadership for the force."

On 27 October, a delegation from Canada visited Haiti to assess the ongoing crises, and to consult with stakeholders on the possible courses of action that could be taken to resolve them. The delegation returned to Canada by 31 October.

Eric Jean Baptiste, the leader of the Rally of Progressive National Democrats, was assassinated on the way to his home in the Laboule 12 area on 28 October 2022, when his car was ambushed. Baptiste's bodyguard was also killed in the attack. Former senator Yvon Buissereth was assassinated in the same area a few months earlier.

== International reactions ==
- Japan – On 14 October 2022, Japan's Ministry of Foreign Affairs advised its citizens not to travel to Haiti for any reason, and for Japanese citizens already in Haiti to leave the country immediately, citing a destabilization of security. On 24 October, Japan temporarily closed its embassy in Haiti, setting up a provisional office in the neighboring Dominican Republic.
- Taiwan – Taiwan's Ministry of Foreign Affairs closed Taiwan's embassy in Haiti on 15 and 16 September in response to the protests occurring throughout Haiti. On 25 October, Taiwan's foreign ministry stated that the Taiwanese government is helping the Haitian government buy personal equipment such as bulletproof vests from Taiwanese manufacturers. Taiwan is also cooperating with the U.S.-based organization Food for the Poor to provide rice to Haiti.
