= Ra (disambiguation) =

Ra is the Sun-god of Ancient Egypt.

Ra or RA may also refer to:

== Arts and entertainment ==
=== Film and television ===
- Ra (Stargate), a character from the film Stargate, based on the Egyptian god
- Ra (1972 film), a 1972 documentary film about Thor Heyerdahl's expeditions
- Ra (2014 film), a Tamil fantasy film

=== Music ===
==== Terminology ====
- A half-step below Re on the solfège musical scale

==== Performers ====
- Ra (band), an American rock band
- Ra (musician), the pseudonym of Raoul Sinier, a French digital painter and electronic musician
- R.A. the Rugged Man (born c. 1974), American rapper
- Sun Ra (1914–1993), American jazz musician and philosopher
- Rise Against, an American punk/hardcore band

==== Albums ====
- Ra (Utopia album), 1977
- Ra (Eloy album), 1988

==== Songs ====
- "Ra", a song by Northlane from Node, 2015
- "Ra" (Inna song), 2018

=== Other media ===
- Ra (novel), a 2013 novel by Sam Hughes under the pseudonym qntm
- Ra (board game), a board game for two to five players designed by Reiner Knizia and based on ancient Egyptian culture
- Resident Advisor, an online magazine
- Command & Conquer: Red Alert, a game

== Businesses and organizations ==
=== Academia ===
- Roosevelt Academy, a college in the Netherlands
- Royal Academy of Arts, in London, UK
  - Royal Academician, one of the 80 practicing artists elected as a member of the Royal Academy
- Resident assistant, a student leader

=== Government, military, and political organizations ===
- Rainbow Alliance (Liberia), a political alliance in Liberia
- Rear admiral, a senior naval rank
- Regular Army, the permanent force of an army that is maintained during peacetime
- Regulatory affairs, a department in charge of industry-government relations
- Provisional Irish Republican Army, Irish Nationalist paramilitary group active during The Troubles Abbreviation used by its sympathizers
- Resettlement Administration, a New Deal government program in the US
- Royal Artillery, a regiment of the British Army

=== Other businesses and organizations ===
- Ramblers' Association, a UK organisation for walkers
- Registration authority, a body which maintains lists of international standards codes
- Rowing Australia, governing body for the sport of rowing in Australia
- Road America, which uses the logo "RA"; a racetrack in Wisconsin, US
- Nepal Airlines (IATA code RA)

== Linguistics ==
- Ra (Javanese) (ꦫ), a letter in the Javanese script
- Ra (kana), the Japanese kana ら and ラ
- ረ and ራ, Amharic letters that can be read as variations of ra, also related to the Semitic resh
- Resh or rāʾ, 10th letter of Arabic alphabet
- Ռ or ṙa, the 28th letter in the Armenian alphabet
- र, ड़', ढ़, and र्ह, Devanagari letters which can be called ra, ṛa or rha
- Ԗ, the 23rd letter rha («ра») in the older (1924−1927) Moksha language Cyrillic script
- ர and ற, Tamil letters articulated as ra, tra or dra depending on the consonant complex

== Places ==
- Argentina, license plate code
- Ra (island) (or Rah), a small island of Vanuatu
- Ra Province in Fiji
  - Ra (Fijian Communal Constituency, Fiji)
  - Ra (Open Constituency, Fiji)
- Republic of Armenia
- Rawlins County, Kansas, of which the largest city is Atwood

== Religion and mythology ==
- Ra, the Sun-god of Ancient Egypt
- Rå, a creature in Scandinavian mythology
- Rā, a Māori word for the Sun that is also used in other Polynesian languages
- Roua or Ra, a Polynesian deity
- Tama-nui-te-rā, a Maori Sun-god
- Radeyallāhu ′Anhu, an Islamic honorific

== Science and technology ==
=== Biology and medicine ===
- Retinoic acid, a metabolite of vitamin A
- Retrograde amnesia, a form of amnesia
- Rheumatoid arthritis, a chronic, systemic inflammatory disorder that attacks synovial joints
- Refractory anemia, an expression of myelodysplasia

=== Computing ===
- .ra, the file extension for RealAudio files
- Registration authority, in public key cryptography
- RemoteAccess, a BBS software program
- Route Advertisement, in networking, part of the Neighbor Discovery Protocol

=== Transportation ===
- SJ Ra, a Swedish locomotive
- Radar altimeter, an instrument on aircraft
- Resolution Advisory, an aircraft instruction from a Traffic Collision Avoidance System

=== Other uses in science and technology ===
- $R_a$ or Ra, a popular parameter of roughness, defined as the average of absolute values of deviation from the mean of a surface
- Color rendering index ($R_a$), a measure of the ability of a light source to reveal the colors of objects faithfully
- Radium, symbol Ra, a chemical element
- Rain (METAR weather code RA)
- Rayleigh number, in physics
- Relation algebra, a type of mathematical structure
- Right ascension, in astronomy
- Risk analysis, in several fields
- Resource adequacy, in electrical power grids

== People with the surname ==
- Armen Ra, Iranian-born American musician
- Aron Ra, American author, podcaster, and atheist activist
- Ed Ra (born 1981), American politician

== Other uses ==
- Ra I and Ra II, reed boats used by Thor Heyerdahl's transatlantic expeditions
- Registered Architect, as a post-nominal suffix
- Relationship anarchy, the practice of building human relationships in non-hierarchical ways, based on individual agreements rather than cultural norms
- Remittance advice, a letter sent by a customer to a supplier, to inform the supplier that their invoice has been paid
- Research assistant, in academia
- Republic Act, Philippine laws from 1946 to 1972 and after 1987
- One of several ISO 217 standard paper sizes

== See also ==
- RAH (disambiguation)
- RHA (disambiguation)
- Ras (disambiguation)
- Re (disambiguation)
