= Charles-Henri Baker =

Haitian industrialist

Charles Henri Baker
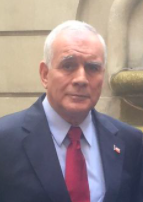
- Baker in 2021
- Born: 3 June 1955 (age 71); Port-au-Prince, Haiti
- Education: Saint Leo University (B.A.)
- Occupations: Industrialist, politician

Charles-Henri Jean-Marie Baker (born 3 June 1955) is a Haitian industrialist and presidential candidate. He is a former member of the Group of 184. Baker was a candidate for president in Haiti's 2006 and 2010 elections.

== Early and personal life ==
Baker was born in Port-au-Prince. His father Édouard Baker was a mulatto who was a prominent engineer, agronomist, well-known football player, and son of an Episcopalian missionary from England, who married an Afro-Haitian woman. His mother, Louise Barranco, was a businesswoman from a light-skinned mulatto elite family, (Note: Her family has Spanish descent since Barranco is a surname originating in Spain.) who was the founder of the first supermarket chain in Haiti and whose father was a trader. Baker has two brothers and three sisters.

After completing his elementary education in Haiti, he traveled to the United States. In 1972 he graduated from Redondo Union High School in Redondo Beach, California. He later attended Saint Leo University in Florida, graduating with a Bachelor of Arts degree in business administration in 1976. In 1975, he married Marie Florence Apaid, sister of André Apaid. He has four children and eleven grandchildren.

== Business career ==
Baker began his business career as a manager at the age of 21 in his family-owned and operated supermarket chain. When his father became ill, he took over the family-owned 90-acre farm Habitation Dujour, which grew sugarcane, banana, and tobacco. Eventually, the farm was expanded by another 120 acres which made it the largest flue-cured tobacco farm in Haiti, with more than 200 acres. Simultaneously, from 1982 to 1985 he worked with the tobacco growers of Haiti through the Comme il faut Company, where he held the position of Assistant to the Leaf Growing Manager.

Beginning in the late 1980s, Baker purchased a garment factory, Pantalon Boucanier S.A.. This factory, which is monitored by Betterworks an affiliate of OIT, adheres to strict international standards. It employs hundreds of Haitians who are paid the minimum salary required by Haitian law. It has set up an incentive program which permits workers to make 50% more than the minimum salary while getting the 25% benefits required by Haitian law. Baker sells the garments produced in these factories to major corporations such as Walmart and K-Mart.

In 2000, he joined the Association des Industries d’Haïti as a member and a year later became its vice president.

== Political activity ==
Baker was a prominent member of the Group of 184 (G 184), a coalition of Haitian organizations opposing Haitian President Jean-Bertrand Aristide.

=== 2006 presidential election ===
In August 2005, Baker announced his intention to run for the president of Haiti in the elections originally planned for November 2005 but later moved to February 2006.

Baker and his Respè coalition received 8.24 percent of the vote, losing to René Préval.

=== 2010 presidential election ===
Baker ran for President of Haiti in the 28 November 2010 Haiti elections, under the Respè Party of Haiti.

=== 2015 presidential election ===
Baker ran for President in the 2015 election, centering his campaign around five pillars: agriculture, healthcare, education, infrastructure, and government transparency.
