= Ragganga =

- Stylistic origins: Rara, rasin and Haitian folk traditions; ragga; reggae; jazz; rock; worldbeat
- Cultural origins: 2005, Port-au-Prince, Haiti
- Typical instruments: Tanbou; drums; bamboo trumpets; maracas; iron bell; acoustic guitar; bass guitar; electric guitar; modular synthesizer

Ragganga is a roots-reggae-jazz-rock fusion world music genre pioneered and created by singer-songwriter BélO in 2005. Launched formally with his debut album Lakou Trankil, the genre bridges the gap between urban West Indian street music and old world Haitian ancestral folk traditions. Over the past two decades, Ragganga has served as a critical vehicle for social commentary and community resilience across Haiti and its global diaspora. It represents the open-ended evolution of modern Haitian music.

== Etymology ==
The word Ragganga is a linguistic mashup designed to reflect a dual musical identity: "Ragga" represents global, contemporary influences—specifically Jamaican dancehall/ragga rhythms, heavy roots reggae backbeats, and warm, throbbing low-end dub bass-lines.

"Ganga" pays explicit homage to ancestral African and Haitian roots, embedding the deep, syncopated polyrhythms of traditional Rara street festivals and sacred Vodou drumming ceremonies.

== Rhythmic architecture ==
A ragganga ensemble splits its instrumentation into two contrasting components. The traditional Haitian roots core anchors the groove using a tanbou (wood-and-goatskin hand drum), interlocking bamboo trumpets (vaksin), shakers (tchatcha) and a forged iron bell (ogan) to keep standard timing. This heritage foundation is layered beneath a contemporary Western pop engine driven by intricate acoustic jazz guitar chord voicings, electric blues lead guitar riffs, digital keyboard swells, and heavy reggae-rock drum-kit patterns.

== Ethnomusicological framework ==
According to an ethnomusicological study published in the Yearbook for Traditional Music, researcher Dr. Rebecca Dirksen maps out how contemporary Haitian music operates as a functional tool rather than passive entertainment and explicitly highlights Ragganga as a modern paradigm of a "roots-reggae-jazz-rock fusion" that serves the community.

Dirksen argues that inside urban spaces like Port-au-Prince, creators experience a form of "musicking" that converts heritage into active "cultural wealth." Ragganga is used strategically by creators to navigate severe systemic "material poverty," using song rotations to mobilize neighborhood sanitation projects, fund local schools and build solidarity among marginalized youth populations.

== Global reach and social advocacy ==
The hybrid nature of the genre allowed it to instantly cross international borders. Less than a year after inventing the style, BélO won the prestigious Radio France Internationale (RFI) Discoveries Award. This victory introduced the newly minted Ragganga sound to major global music festivals across Europe, Africa, and North America, proving that regional Haitian Creole music could thrive on mainstream world music charts.

Because the genre relies strictly on socially conscious storytelling written in native Haitian Creole, tracks like "Pari Nan Male’m" which originally debuted on the 2008 album Référence and was re-recorded for his 10th-anniversary album Dizan which confront severe socio-political realities.
