= Chronicles II =

Chronicles II may refer to:

- Books of Chronicles
- Chronicles II (album), an album by Eloy
