= RAA =

RAA or Raa may refer to:

== RAA ==
- Ralph Appelbaum Associates, museum exhibition design firms
- Ramos Arizpe Assembly, a General Motors automobile factory in Ramos Arizpe, Coahuila, Mexico
- Reasoned action approach, a psychological theory to explain behavior
- Reciprocal Access Agreement, a bilateral defense and security pact between Australia and Japan
- Recreation and Amusement Association, a system of brothels set up by the Japanese government for US occupation forces
- Recreational Aviation Australia, governing body for ultralights in Australia
- Reductio ad absurdum, a style of logical argument or formal rule inference
- Reeve Aleutian Airways, an airline headquartered in Anchorage, Alaska
- Regional Airline Association
- Requiem: Avenging Angel, a 1999 first-person shooter video game
- Research on Armenian Architecture
- Resource acquisition ability, a term in social psychology.
- Right atrial appendage
- Royal Artillery Association, an association of serving or former Royal Regiment of Artillery soldiers
- Royal Australian Artillery, a corps in the Australian Army
- Royal Automobile Association, of South Australia, also known as RAA
- Ruby Application Archive
- The Rural Alberta Advantage, a Canadian indie band
- Riksantikvarieämbetet, the Swedish National Heritage Board
- Renin-angiotensin-aldosterone system, another name for the renin–angiotensin system

== Raa ==
- Raa, Rā or Tama-nui-te-rā, the personification of the sun in Māori mythology
- Raa (film), a 2001 Indian Telugu-language film
- Raa (surname)
- Raa Atoll, an administrative division of the Maldives
- Raa, the fourth consonant of the Thaana abugida used in Dhivehi

== See also ==
- Raa Raa (disambiguation)
- RAÄ
