= RAHS =

RAHS may refer to:

- Royal Australian Historical Society
- Royal Agricultural and Horticultural Society of South Australia

== Schools ==
- Raisbeck Aviation High School in Tukwila, Washington, United States
- Redwood Alternative High School in Castro Valley, California, United States
- Reedsburg Area High School in Reedsburg, Wisconsin, United States
- Rio Americano High School in Sacramento, California, United States
- Roald Amundsen High School in Chicago, Illinois, United States
- Robbinsdale Armstrong High School in Plymouth, Minnesota, United States
- Rochester Adams High School in Rochester Hills, Michigan, United States
- Rochester Area High School (Pennsylvania) in Rochester, Pennsylvania, United States
- Rosario Advent High School in Rosario, Batangas Philippines
- Roseville Area High School in Roseville, Minnesota, United States
- Roussin Academy High School in Montreal, Quebec, Canada

== See also ==
- Rah (disambiguation)
