= Torolf =

Torolf is a Norwegian given name that may refer to

- Torolf Eklund (1912–2000), Finnish aircraft designer
- Torolf Elster (1911–2006), Norwegian newspaper and radio journalist
- Torolf Juell (1897–1983), Norwegian military officer and judge
- Torolf Nordbø (born 1956), Norwegian musician and comedian
- Torolf Prytz (1858–1938), Norwegian architect, goldsmith and politician
- Torolf Raa (born 1933), Norwegian diplomat
- Torolf Rein (born 1934), Norwegian military officer
- Arne Torolf Strøm (1901–1972), Norwegian politician
