= Platfòm Pitit Desalin =

Child of Dessalines Platform Platfòm Pitit Desalin
- Leader: Jean-Charles Moïse
- Founded: December 2014
- Split from: Inite
- Headquarters: Port-au-Prince
- Ideology: Social democracy Democratic socialism Dessalinism; Left-wing nationalism Left-wing populism
- Political position: Centre-left to left-wing
- Colours: Red
- Chamber of Deputies: 0 / 118
- Senate: 0 / 30

Website
- platfompititdessalines.com

Platfòm Pitit Desalin (English: Child of Dessalines Platform), named after Haitian revolutionary leader Jean-Jacques Dessalines, is a Haitian political party led by Jean-Charles Moïse. As of 11 April 2018, the party had two seats in the Chamber of Deputies and one seat in the Senate. Since January 10, 2023, both houses of parliament in Haiti have been vacant. The party leader, Jean-Charles Moïse, resigned as Senator in protest of an alleged bribe of $2.5 million offered to him by allies of President Michel Martelly and in order to run for president in the 2015 presidential election. He received 14.3% of the popular vote and came in third place. In the aftermath of the election, the party played a major role in the opposition protests against eventual winner Jovenel Moïse.

Jean-Charles Moïse and General Secretary of the party Assad Volcy have both been central figures in the movement against de facto head of state Ariel Henry.

Platfòm Pitit Desalin have alleged mistreatment of their party members at the hands of the Haitian government. While Moïse was still a senator he was allegedly arrested and detained for half a day by Haitian police at a Pitit Desalin rally. The party also claims that there have been police raids on its offices, as well as 30 politically motivated arrests of party members in November 2015. One party activist, Maxo Gaspard, was shot and killed near the party offices, allegedly by a police officer, although the police have denied their involvement.

== Ideology ==
Platfòm Pitit Desalin lists its three central pillars as: sovereignty in the political sector, solidarity in the social sector, and prosperity in the economic sector. It is a left-wing nationalist party, with connections to the Fanmi Lavalas movement of former president Jean-Bertrand Aristide.

The party states that "it is committed to working for a just society based on national sovereignty and economic and social development for all of its sons, in accordance with Dessalinian ideals." They also support an "equitable redistribution of wealth" in Haiti.

The party advocates for "peaceful revolution" in Haiti, but Moïse has also encouraged demonstrators to "arm themselves with machetes", while stressing that he was not telling them to use firearms.
