= Core Group =

Haitian intergovernmental organization

The Core Group was established by U.N. Security Council resolution S/RES/1542 (2004). It is chaired by the U.N. Special Representative to Haiti, and also includes representatives from Brazil, Canada, France, Germany, Spain, the European Union, the United States, and the Organization of American States .

The group presents itself as providing advice on how to resolve Haiti's socioeconomic and political crises and improve democracy in the country. Its critics, including former special envoy to Haiti Daniel Foote have accused it of undemocratic meddling in Haiti's internal affairs, including supporting former president Jovenel Moïse as his administration descended into despotism. They also backed Prime Minister-designate Ariel Henry to become Prime Minister over interim Prime Minister Claude Joseph and Senate Leader Joseph Lambert.

Foote has also accused the group of prioritizing the stability of the country over the Haitian popular will.
