= RHA =

RHA is an acronym that may refer to:

- Rolled homogeneous armour
- Regional health authority (disambiguation)
- Regional health authority (United Kingdom), a former type of administrative organisation of the NHS in England and Wales
- Religious Heritage of America
- Residence hall association
- Rice husk ash, a by-product from rice culture used as cement admixture
- Rivers and Harbors Act, any number of various acts of legislation of the United States Congress
- Road Haulage Association
- Royal Hibernian Academy, and the post-nominal letters used by its members
- Royal Horse Artillery
- RNA helicase, an enzyme

Rha may refer to:

- Rha, Netherlands, a population center in Steenderen
- Rhamnose, a monosaccharide
- Volga River (the ancient name of the river in Latin, from Ancient Greek Ῥᾶ, thought to be a borrowing from reconstructed Scythian *Rā or *Rahā)
- Rha (Cyrillic), a Cyrillic letter

Letters from alphabets that can be called rha:

- र, ड़', ढ़, र्ह — Devanagari letters which can be called ra, ṛa or rha;
- Ԗ — the 23rd letter rha («ра») in the older (1924−1927) Moksha language Cyrillic alphabet

== See also ==
- Ra (disambiguation)
