= Daniel Rouzier =

Haitian tycoon

- Born: Pétion-Ville, Haiti
- Education: Economics
- Alma mater: Dartmouth College; Georgetown University
- Occupations: Economist, entrepreneur, philanthropist
- Organization: Food For The Poor (NGO)
- Notable work: Vision or Illusion; The Might of the Ideas; Faith, Love, and Hope
- Board member of: Sun Auto, E-Power, PromoCapital Bank
- Spouse: Karine Abrahams Rouzier
- Children: 3
- Parent(s): Gérard Raoul Rouzier (father); Marie-Hélène Brun (mother)
- Relatives: Fabrice Rouzier (brother); Pilou Rouzier (brother)

Daniel Gérard Rouzier (French pronunciation: [danjɛl ʒeʁaʁ ʁuzje]; born Pétion-Ville, 1960) is a Haitian tycoon. Rouzier runs several companies in different sectors in Haiti, including car dealers, and an electric power company; and is member of the executive board of PromoCapital; a Haitian bank. Rouzier is member of the Haitian-American Chamber of Commerce (AMCHAM).

== Biography ==
Born into an elite mulatto family, Rouzier was alumnus of Institution Saint-Louis de Gonzague, one of the most prestigious schools in Haiti. His father, Gérard Rouzier, was a jurist, president of the Haitian Football Federation, Vice President of CONCACAF, and Minister of Sports and Youth in the dictatorship of Jean-Claude Duvalier in the 1970s. He is brother of renowned pianist Fabrice Rouzier and sports columnist Pilou Rouzier.

Rouzier graduated from the management and accounting at Dartmouth College and Georgetown University in the United States. He is an avid football player and a bibliophile. Rouzier, who has authored three books, owns one of the most complete libraries of Haiti, and serves as a regular contributor to Haitian daily newspapers. Rouzier is a philanthropist, vice-president of the Haitian chapter of Food for the Poor and has provided food, housing, medical services, education to poor families within Haiti.

== Politics ==
Rouzier was a supporter of the 2004 coup d’etat that ousted President Jean-Bertrand Aristide for the second time, and accused him to be “one of the most violent rulers Haiti ever had,” and argued that Aristide’s “only intent seems to have only been to replace the dictators that preceded him rather than to promote real change in Haiti.” In 2010, he was appointed as Honorary Consul from Jamaica to Haiti. On 15 May 2011, he was appointed prime minister by President Michel Martelly the day after his inauguration, but the Chamber of Deputies of Haiti, dominated by the Opposition, rejected his nomination on 21 June 2011. President Martelly has expressed disappointment with the deputies, but he accepted it.

== Personal life ==
Rouzier married Karine Abrahams and had three children. In 2005, his wife was kidnapped and held for more than ten days; Abrahams was released after multiple payments of ransom and has lived abroad since.

== Publications ==
- Vision ou Illusion (2000)
- Le Pouvoir des Idees (2002)
- Foi, Amour et Espoir (2006)
