= Rah-rah =

Rah Rah or rah-rah may refer to:

- Rah Rah (band)
- Rah-rah skirt
- "Rah Rah", a 2005 song by Pitbull from Money Is Still a Major Issue
- "Ra Ra", a song by Gurukiran Shetty, Nanditha and Rajesh Krishnan from the 2004 Indian Kannada film Apthamitra
  - "Raa Raa", its remake by Vidyasagar and Binny Krishnakumar from the 2005 Indian Tamil film Chandramukhi (a remake of Apthamitra)
    - "Ra Ra Remix", its remake by Sri Charan and Nityasree from the 2010 Indian Telugu film Nagavalli (a spinoff of Chandramukhi)

== See also ==
- RAH (disambiguation)
- Rara (disambiguation)
- Raa Raa (disambiguation)
