= Raa Raa =

Raa Raa (Telugu: come come) may refer to:

- Raa Raa (2011 film), a 2011 Indian film by Sandilya
- Raa Raa (2018 film), a 2018 indian film by Shankarand
- "Ra Ra", a song by Gurukiran Shetty, Nanditha and Rajesh Krishnan from the 2004 Indian Kannada film Apthamitra
  - "Raa Raa", its remake by Vidyasagar and Binny Krishnakumar from the 2005 Indian Tamil film Chandramukhi (a remake of Apthamitra)
    - "Ra Ra Remix", its remake by Sri Charan and Nityasree from the 2010 Indian Telugu film Nagavalli (a spinoff of Chandramukhi)

== See also ==
- RAA (disambiguation)
- Rah-rah (disambiguation)
- Raa Raa the Noisy Lion, a 2011 British animated series
- Ra Ra... Krishnayya, a 2014 Indian film
- Ra Ra Sarasukku Ra Ra, a 2023 Indian film
