= Veye Yo =

Vigilance (or Veye Yo) is a political party in Haiti, led by Lavarice Guadin. In the 2010-11 general elections, the party won 1 seat.
