= Sophia Martelly =

Haitian politician

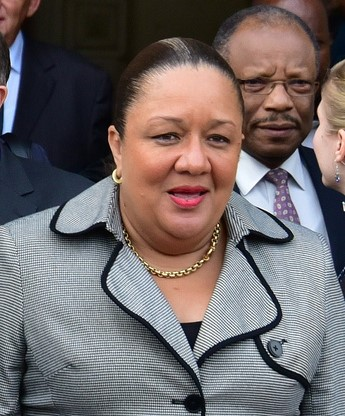
- Martelly in 2014

First Lady of Haiti
- In role May 14, 2011 – February 7, 2016
- President: Michel Martelly
- Preceded by: Elisabeth Delatour Préval
- Succeeded by: Ginette Michaud Privert

Personal details
- Born: Sophia Saint-Rémy; October 9, 1965 (age 60) New York City, New York, U.S.
- Spouse: Michel Martelly (m. 1987)
- Children: Olivier; Sandro; Yani; Malaika

Sophia Saint-Rémy Martelly (born October 9, 1965) is a Haitian health activist, politician, and former first lady of Haiti from May 14, 2011, until February 7, 2016. She is the wife of the former president of Haiti, Michel Martelly. She focused on issues related to public health, healthcare and alleviating malnutrition during her tenure as first lady.

== Biography ==
=== Early life and marriage ===
Martelly was born by Sophia Saint-Rémy on October 9, 1965, in New York City in the United States. Her father, Charles Edouard Saint-Rémy, was from Gonaïves, and her mother, Mona Lisa Florez, is from Port-au-Prince. The Saint-Rémy family is originally from Gonaïves, where Sophia Saint Rémy was raised. The Saint-Remys suffered under the dictatorship of François "Papa Doc" Duvalier; her grandmother was arrested and detained by Duvalier and two of her paternal relatives were executed during his dictatorship.

Saint-Rémy and her future husband, the singer and politician Michel Martelly, had been friends when they were children, but had lived separate lives as young adults. He migrated to the United States with his American first wife during the 1980s.

In 1986, Martelly divorced his first wife and returned to Haiti. Saint-Rémy and Martelly, who were childhood friends, reunited in 1987, shortly after he moved back to the country. When they tried to marry, both of their mothers objected based on their skin color: she has lighter skin, while he has a darker complexion. They ignored their parents' protests and, instead, moved together to Miami, Florida, later in 1987. where they married in a small 1987 wedding ceremony. He worked in construction, while she worked as a word processor. They returned to Haiti in 1988 and had four children, Olivier, Alexandre, Yani and Michel.

Their early marriage was different from Martelly's onstage "Sweet Mickey" persona. He imposed a curfew on her and forbade her to chew gum as recently as the late-1990s. She is four years younger than her husband.

The couple lived in a condominium in Miami Beach, Florida, during the mid-1990s.
