= Raas (surname) =

Raas is a surname. Notable people with the surname include:

- Jan Raas (born 1952), Dutch cyclist
- Naser al-Raas (c. 1983–2016), Canadian political activist

== See also ==
- Raa (surname)
- Raes, surname
