= Chronicles I =

Chronicles I may refer to:

- Books of Chronicles
- Chronicles I (album), an album by Eloy
