= Liliane Pierre-Paul =

Haitian journalist (1953–2023)

Liliane Pierre-Paul (16 June 1953 – 31 July 2023) was a Haitian journalist, activist, radio broadcaster, and radio station founder. She broadcast in Haitian Creole, which she described as the people's language. Pierre-Paul received a Courage in Journalism Award in 1990 from the International Women's Media Foundation. She also received le prix Roc Cadet de SOS Liberte in 2014.

Musician and former President of Haiti Michel Martelly sang a carnival méringue song entitled "Bal Bannann nan" (Give Her the Banana), mocking Paul. She appears in the film Moloch Tropical. Her husband Anthony Barbier was appointed general secretary of the National Palace by Provisional President Jocelerme Privert.

Pierre-Paul died on 31 July 2023, at the age of 70.
