= Chronicles II (album) =

Compilation album by Eloy
- Released: 2 May 1994
- Recorded: 1994
- Studio: Horus Sound, Hanover
- Genre: Progressive rock; art rock
- Length: 60:11
- Label: ACI
- Producer: Frank Bornemann

Eloy chronology
Chronicles I (1993)	Chronicles II (1994)	The Tides Return Forever (1994)

Audio sample
- "Escape to the Heights '94": file; help

Professional ratings
Review scores
Source	Rating
Allmusic	2.5/5 stars

Chronicles II is the second of a two-part compilation of re-recorded songs by the German rock band Eloy. The first part, Chronicles I, was released the preceding year.

Following Chronicles I in a chronological order, Chronicles II contains songs from the years 1984–1992 and the albums Metromania (1984), Ra (1988) and Destination (1992). The full Chronicles two-part project compiles songs from every Eloy studio album released between 1977 and 1992, except for Performance.

Whilst Chronicles I songs were all re-recorded, in Chronicles II Eloy only re-recorded the Metromania songs and remastered the ones from Ra and Destination, as the latter had already been recorded using advanced digital technology, and there was no need to record them again in order to enhance their quality.

The band's leader Frank Bornemann invited some of the former members of the band to play the Metromania songs, in order to reach the highest level of authenticity possible.

== Track listing ==
No.	Title	Writer(s)	Original Album	Length
1.	"Escape to the Heights '94"	Eloy; Frank Bornemann, Mark Sarkautzky	Metromania	5:10
2.	"All Life Is One '94"	Eloy; Martine Ryan, Andrew Ward	Metromania	6:29
3.	"Nightriders '94"	Eloy; Ryan, Ward	Metromania	4:37
4.	"Follow The Light '94"	Eloy; Ryan, Ward	Metromania	9:47
5.	"Rainbow"	Bornemann, Achim Gieseler; Bornemann	Ra	4:37
6.	"Voyager of the Future Race"	Eloy; Bornemann	Ra	6:28
7.	"Fire and Ice"	Eloy; Bornemann, Diana Baden	Destination	5:09
8.	"Call of the Wild"	Eloy; Bornemann, Baden	Destination	7:00
9.	"Prisoner in Mind"	Eloy; Bornemann, Baden	Destination	4:26
10.	"Eclipse of Mankind"	Eloy; Bornemann, Baden	Destination	6:28
Total length:				60:11

== Personnel ==
All information according to the album's liner notes, and the liner notes of Ra and Destination. Numbers in parentheses indicate specific tracks.

Eloy

- Frank Bornemann: guitar, vocals
- Michael Gerlach: keyboards (1–10), drums, synth-bass (5, 6)

Eloy former members

- Klaus-Peter Matziol: bass (1–4)
- Hannes Arkona: guitar (1–4)
- Hannes Folberth: keyboards (1–4)
- Fritz Randow: drums (1–4)

Guest musicians

- Helge Engelke: acoustic guitar, guitar solo (7), bass, rhythm guitar (9)
- Detlev Goy: bass (7, 8)
- Achim Gieseler: keyboards (5)
- Nico Baretta: drums (7–10)
- Lenny McDowell: flute (8)
- Amy, Jane, Sabine: vocals (4)
- Anette Stangenberg: vocals (5)
- Stefan Höls: backing vocals (5)
- Sue Wist: vocal intro (6)

Production

- Frank Bornemann: production
- Gerhard Wölfle: recording, mixing
- Hans-Jörg Maucksch: mastering
