= BélO =

Haitian interpreter, composer and guitarist

BélO performing to a sold-out crowd at Joe's Pub in New York City, 2026

Jean Bélony Murat (born October 29, 1979), known professionally as BélO, is a Haitian singer-songwriter and guitarist. His musical style, known as "ragganga," blends reggae, jazz, and traditional Haitian rhythms, and his lyrics focus on social issues in Haiti. His debut album, Lakou Trankil, was released in 2005 and was followed by Référence in 2008. In 2006, he won the RFI Discovery Prize (Prix Découvertes RFI), an award previously given to artists like Tiken Jah Fakoly and Rokia Traoré.

== Early life ==
BélO was born Jean Bélony Murat in October 1979, in Croix-des-Bouquets, north of Haiti's capital, Port-au-Prince, and grew up in Pétion-Ville. At age 11, he decided to pursue a career in music after performing a song by Buju Banton, one of his favorite artists, at a book fair. In 1994, he formed a group called the Méga Boys with friends. BélO started out playing bass before switching to acoustic guitar. After studying accounting at university from 2001 to 2005, he turned to music full time and released his first solo album.

== Career ==
BélO released his first album, Lakou Trankil ("Quiet streets"), in 2005. Its songs describe life in Haiti and the problems the country faces. His second album, Référence (2008), blends reggae with jazz, traditional Haitian music, and some rock. Like its predecessor, its lyrics deal with social themes such as peace, unity, love, children, and protection against sexually transmitted diseases. Both albums featured Fabrice Rouzier and guitarist Clément "Kéké" Belizaire from the band Mizik Mizik.

Following the January 2010 earthquake in Haiti, BélO launched a non-stop tour to raise funds to help relief efforts. BélO also founded Femmes à Aimer (“Women to Love”), an organization that supports women incarcerated in Haiti; he visits the women's prison frequently, bringing supplies and performing for inmates on holidays such as Valentine's Day. In 2011, he released his third album, Haiti Debout (Haiti Stand-up), distributed by Harmonia Mundi. The accompanying tour included performances in Germany, Italy, Romania, France, South Korea, the United Kingdom, Canada, and the United States. He later released Natif Natal (2014), Dizan (2016) and Motivasyon (2019). In March 2023, he released Fanm Lakou Trankil, a new version of his debut album Lakou Trankil, in which ten Haitian women artists reinterpret the songs.

== Discography ==
- Lakou Trankil (2005)
- Référence (2008)
- Haiti Debout (2011)
- Natif Natal (2014)
- Dizan (2016)
- Motivasyon (2019)
- Fanm Lakou Trankil (2023)

== Awards ==
- 2006, Prix Découvertes RFI
- 2007, Haitian Music Awards, Best Male Artist 2007
- 2010, SACEM, Caribbean Song of the Year
- 2020, Unsigned Only Music Competition, Grand Prize
