= Gérard Raoul Rouzier =

Ministry of Youth and Sports
- In office April 1979 – February 1986
- President: Jean-Claude Duvalier
- Preceded by: Office created
- Succeeded by: Office abolished (Note: After the end of the Duvalier Regime, the office was merged with the Ministry of National Education but later revived as Ministry of Youth, Sports and Civic Action)

Personal details
- Spouse: Marie-Hélène (née Brun)
- Children: Daniel Rouzier; Fabrice Rouzier; Pilou Rouzier
- Occupation: Lawyer
- Known for: Executive roles, formerly: Haitian Football Federation (President); CONCACAF Council (Member of the Executive Committee and Vice President); FIFA Executive Committee (Member); Haitian Olympic Committee (Vice President)

Gérard Raoul Rouzier was a Haitian lawyer and former member of the FIFA Executive Committee.

Rouzier is an acclaimed football administrator to represent Haiti on the international level.

== Career ==
Rouzier served as assessor for FIFA (1944–1946), FHF President (1960–1966), Member of the Executive Committee and Vice President of CONCACAF (1961–1972), Member of the FIFA Executive Committee (1972–1976), Vice President of the Haitian Olympic Committee (1962–1977?) and was on the Disciplinary Committee of the 1976 Summer Olympics.

Rouzier was the inaugural appointed minister of Ministry of Youth and Sports.
