= Mirlande Manigat =

First Lady of Haiti in 1988

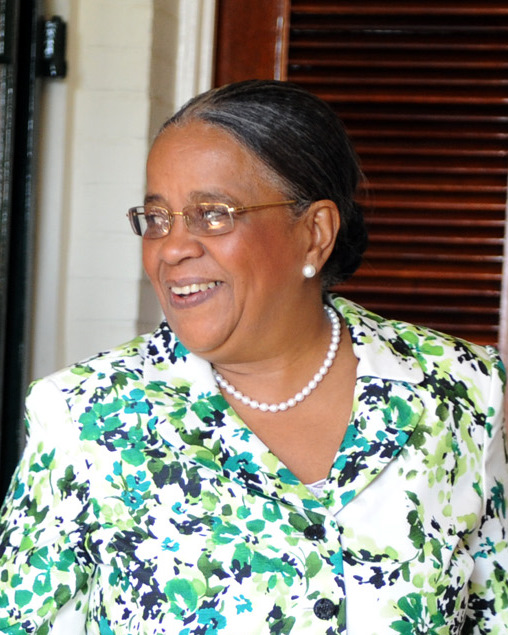
- Manigat in 2011

First Lady of Haiti
- In office February 7, 1988 – June 20, 1988
- President: Leslie Manigat
- Preceded by: Henri Namphy
- Succeeded by: Henri Namphy

Personal details
- Born: Mirlande Hyppolite; November 3, 1940 (age 85) Miragoâne, Haiti
- Party: Rally of Progressive National Democrats
- Spouse: Leslie Manigat (m. 1970; died 2014)

Mirlande Manigat (née Hyppolite, born November 3, 1940) is a Haitian constitutional law professor and candidate in 2010-11 Haitian general election. She is the widow of former president Leslie Manigat and briefly served as First Lady of Haiti in 1988.

== 2010 presidential election ==
Mirlande Manigat was the presidential candidate for the Rally of Progressive National Democrats (RDNP) centre-right party. On October 18, 2010, Dr. Manigat also received the endorsement of the Collectif pour le Renouveau Haïtien (COREH).

Her platform for the presidency included a focus on education of the youth of Haiti, and lifting the long-standing and restrictive constitutional conditions on dual nationality. She specifically promoted opening government positions for members of the Haitian diaspora. Manigat also aimed for a more independent Haitian state, one less reliant upon and subject to foreign governments and NGOs.

Like 2010 presidential candidate Michel Martelly, Manigat initially called for November 28, 2010 presidential votes to be canceled given the widespread allegations of fraud in the first round, but backtracked after reports surfaced that she had polled well.
