= Yves Cristalin =

Haitian politician

Yves Cristalin is a Haitian politician who served as president of the Chamber of Deputies.

Cristalin was born in January 1969 in Port-au-Prince. He is an economist by training. He was a member of the cabinet of the Jean-Bertrand Aristide in 1995. He was a member of the Chamber of Deputies from Fanmi Lavalas from 2000 to 2004. He was the president of the Chamber of Deputies from 2003 to January 2004.

Cristalin was counselor of President René Préval in 2009. He was minister of social affairs and labor from 2009 to 2010. He was the presidential candidate of Lavni party in the 2010 elections.
