= Eliezer Cadet =

Haitian Vodou priest (1897–1995)

- Born: Jean Didier Eliezer Cadet; 23 March 1897; Port-de-Paix, Haiti
- Died: 8 December 1995 (aged 98); Port-au-Prince, Haiti
- Education: College of Institution Saint-Louis de Gonzague
- Occupation: Vodou priest

Jean Didier Eliezer Cadet (23 May 1897 – 8 December 1995) was a Haitian Vodou priest who, in 1919 attended the Paris Peace Conference and First Pan African Congress on behalf of the Universal Negro Improvement Association (UNIA).

== Family, education, and early life ==
Eliezer was born in Port-de-Paix, Haiti, the son of Mesinor Pierre Cadet, a wealthy dyewood manufacturer, and Amazile Broux. He attended the college of Institution Saint-Louis de Gonzague and subsequently supported himself as a car mechanic in Paris. There he met Nancy Cunard.

== Paris Peace conference ==
Initially, the International League for Darker People, an umbrella organisation comprising the UNIA, had planned to send Ida B. Wells and A. Philip Randolph as delegates, with Cadet as interpreter. But as US authorities denied both Wells and Randolph passports and visas, the UNIA's Cadet, a Haitian national, became the organisations' sole delegate. Cadet left the US at the end of February 1919 for Le Havre, returning on December 1, 1919, to New York. While in Paris, his efforts to contact official delegates were mostly unsuccessful, except for a meeting with Liberian delegate Charles D. B. King, who refused to support the UNIA's demand that control of the former German colonies should be given to Africans and the African diaspora. Cadet's reports to Marcus Garvey, claiming that his efforts had been sabotaged by the NAACPs delegate W. E. B. Du Bois, led to a break between Garvey and Du Bois.

== Later life ==
Cadet went on to become a Hougan (Vodou priest) associated with the loa Damballa. He died in Port-au-Prince on 8 Dec 1995.
