= Repons Peyizan =

Peasant Response
- Haitian Creole name: Repons Peyizan
- French name: Réponse Paysanne
- Leader: Michel Martelly
- Founder: Michel Martelly
- Founded: 2010
- Ideology: Populism
- Political position: Centre-right
- Colors: Green
- Senate: 0 / 30
- Chamber of Deputies: 0 / 119

Repons Peyizan (Haitian Creole for "Peasant Response"; French: Réponse Paysanne) is a political party in Haiti. It was founded by Michel Martelly to support his ultimately successful presidential campaign in the 2010–11 general election. The party also won three seats in the lower Chamber of Deputies, but the elected deputies did not stand for reelection and the party has not contested an election since.

Despite being the founder and leader of the party, Martelly did little during his presidency to build up Repons Peyizan. He instead concentrated his efforts in courting members of the Haitian Tèt Kale Party, whose presidential candidate, Jovenel Moïse, would succeed Martelly. The party has been described as populist.

== History ==
Michel Martelly founded Repons Peyizan in the run-up to the 2010–11 general election, originally as an organization to support his presidential campaign. It registered as a political party in mid-2011 and won three seats in the Chamber of Deputies in the second round of voting.

Repons Peyizan did not nominate a candidate for the 2015 presidential election nor the subsequent November 2016 presidential election. Martelly instead threw his support behind Jovenel Moïse of the Haitian Tèt Kale Party (PHTK). Although Martelly was not officially a member of the PHTK, he had considerable influence over elements of the party and Moïse was viewed by critics as his handpicked successor for the presidency.

== Ideology ==
Repons Peyizan appealed to an agrarian base, but critics described it as lacking a formal ideology and structure. Consequently, Martelly spent most of his presidency affiliating with and receiving the support of the PHTK, instead of building up his own party. Analysts have described Repons Peyizan's platform as populist and centre-right, but also Martelly's governance as authoritarian and reminiscient of the Duvalier family's.
