= Martial Célestin =

1st Prime Minister of Haiti (1913–2011)

1st Prime Minister of Haiti
- In office February 9, 1988 – June 20, 1988
- President: Leslie Manigat
- Preceded by: Office established
- Succeeded by: René Préval (in 1991)

Minister of Justice
- In office February 12, 1988 – June 20, 1988
- President: Leslie Manigat
- Prime Minister: Himself
- Preceded by: François Saint-Fleur
- Succeeded by: Fritz Antoine

Personal details
- Born: Martial Lavaud Célestin; October 4, 1913 Ganthier, Haiti
- Died: February 4, 2011 (aged 97) Port-au-Prince, Haiti
- Spouse: Marie Theres Georges
- Children: Guirlaine Celestin
- Profession: Lawyer, teacher

Martial Lavaud Célestin (French pronunciation: [maʁsjal lavo selɛstɛ̃]; October 4, 1913 – February 4, 2011) was named Prime Minister of Haïti by President Leslie Manigat in February 1988 under the provisions of the 1987 Constitution, and was approved by the Parliament that formed as a result of the January 17, 1988 elections. He was deposed by the June 20, 1988 coup d'état. He was born in Ganthier and was a lawyer by profession. Célestin died on February 4, 2011, at the age of 97.
