= Raa (surname) =

Raa is a Nordic surname. Notable people with the surname include:

- Hedvig Raa-Winterhjelm (1838–1907), Swedish actor
- Jan Raa (born 1939), Norwegian biologist
- Torolf Raa (born 1933), Norwegian diplomat

== See also ==
- Raas (surname)
