= 2010–11 Haitian general election =

General elections held in Haiti on 28 November 2010

2010–11 Haitian presidential election
- 10 November 2010 (first round); 20 March 2011 (second round)
- Registered: 4,694,961

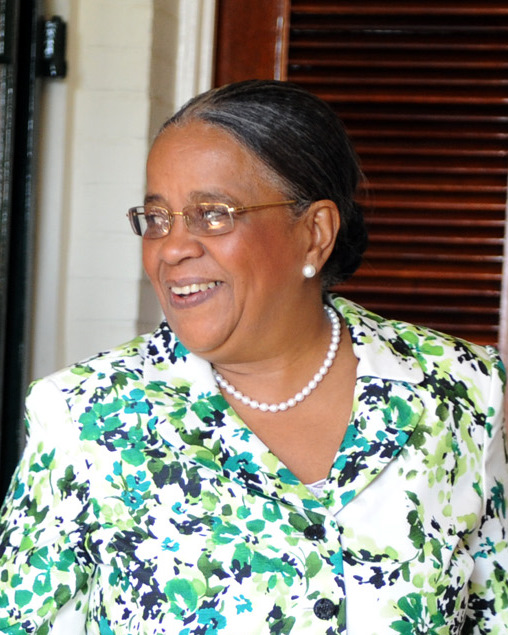
Nominee	Michel Martelly	Mirlande Manigat
Party	Repons Peyizan	RPND
Popular vote	716,986	336,747
Percentage	67.57%	32.43%
President before election
René Préval
Lespwa
Elected President
Michel Martelly
Repons Peyizan

General elections were held in Haiti on 28 November 2010, having originally been scheduled for 28 February. Ten senators and all 99 deputies were to be elected.

Presidential elections were also held. A run-off was originally scheduled for 16 January as no candidate received 50% of the votes cast. However, it was postponed until 20 March 2011 as election officials said they could not hold the runoff while awaiting results from re-polling, with results expected on 31 March.

Official results, announced on 21 April 2011, showed Michel Martelly defeating Mirlande Manigat in the second round of the presidential election.

== Background ==
Due to the January 2010 earthquake, Haitian presidential election was indefinitely postponed; although November 28 was then decided as the date to hold the presidential and legislative elections. Following the magnitude 7.0 earthquake, there were concerns of instability in the country, and the election came amid international pressure over instability in the country. This would be the third democratic election in Haitian history.

== Presidential candidates ==
The deadline to file candidacy for the elections was August 7.

The list of presidential candidates was to have become official on August 17 after the nine-member provisional electoral council was to announce the eligibility criteria. However, the election commission postponed its ruling until August 19 because of disagreement on the electoral law which stipulates that candidates must hold a Haitian passport and have five consecutive years of residence in Haiti, among other requirements. This was to affect Wyclef Jean, Jacques Edouard Alexis, and Leslie Voltaire.

The absence of the Fanmi Lavalas (FL) party was notable because of its popular support. Peter Hallward explained: "The final FL list of candidates was endorsed by the party leader (Jean Bertrand Aristide) by fax, but at the last minute the CEP invented a new requirement, knowing FL would be unable to meet it: Aristide, still exiled in South Africa and denied entry to Haiti, would have to sign the list in person."

=== Wyclef Jean ===
Musician Wyclef Jean, who left Haiti for the United States at the age of 9, said he is qualified to run for president and was in Haiti to initiate the legal process with lawyers and have his fingerprints taken by the judicial police to run for president. He did, however, declare that "There are a lot of rumors that I am running for president. I have not declared that. If we decide to move forward, I am pretty sure that we [would] have all our paperwork straight." He added that after discussions with his family he would "decide on what we're going to do because it is a big sacrifice." His aides said he would officially announce his candidacy on CNN in the United States before flying back to Haiti to enter the race. Some analysts predicted Jean's popularity with the youth of Haiti could help him "easily win the presidential election if his candidacy were approved." On 5 August, he officially registered as a candidate for Viv Ansanm ("Live Together") party with the motto "Fas a Fas." ("Face to Face") The head of the party, Daniel Jean Jacques, confirmed Jean would be the party's candidate for president. Jean spoke of his nomination as "a moment in time and in history. It's very emotional. The United States has Barack Obama and Haiti has Wyclef Jean." He told CNN's Wolf Blitzer that he was running, despite Blitzer's questions about Jean's actual citizenship and passport facts. He also resigned from the chairmanship of Yéle Haiti.

He was criticised by Pras Michel, one of his former bandmates in the Fugees, for the decision to run for president. Others criticised him for his lack of political experience and a vague platform he was to have run on. In the United States he was also criticised by Sean Penn and Arcade Fire's Win Butler who said "Technically, [Wyclef Jean] shouldn't be eligible because he hasn't been a resident of Haiti. And I think him not speaking French and not being fluent in Creole would be a really major issue in trying to run a really complex government, like the government in Haiti. It would kind of be like Arnold Schwarzenegger only speaking Austrian and being elected president of the United States after New York City and L.A. had burned to the ground...I think he is a great musician and he really passionately cares about Haiti. I really hope he throws his support behind someone who is really competent and really eligible."

On August 20, 2010, he was deemed ineligible to run for the presidency and his candidacy was rejected by Haiti's Electoral Council. While he accepted the ruling, many supporters protested the decision. He asked his supporters to stay calm in the wake of the ruling. He also responded in saying he would file an appeal and that "[The political establishment] are trying to keep us out of the race." He argued that he could not comply with the law so strictly because President René Préval had appointed him as a roving ambassador in 2007 and he was allowed to travel and live outside the country.

=== Final list of candidates ===
There were supposed to have been 34 candidates in the preliminary race but a Haitian political website came up with 38.

- Charles Henri Baker, a businessman in the apparel industry. Charles Henri Baker is running under the Respè Party.
- Jean Henry Ceant, a notaire and founder of Aimer Haiti which operated one of the few hospitals after the January 12 quake.
- Jacques-Édouard Alexis, a two-time former prime minister who was forced to resign in the aftermath of food riots in 2008.
- Jude Célestin, executive director of the government's road-building outfit, the National Center of Equipment, and member of President René Préval's Unity (Inite) party.
- Eddy Delaleu, president, founder, and chief executive officer of the NGO Operation Hope for Children of Haiti since its inception in 1994.
- Lavarice Gaudin, an Aristide ally and Miami activist and radio commentator.
- Wilson Jeudi, mayor of Delmas who organized a sister-city relationship with North Miami.
- Chavannes Jeune, development agent, civil engineer and evangelist who came in 3rd place in 2006 election.
- Raymond Joseph, former ambassador to the United States and Wyclef Jean's uncle.
- Mirlande Manigat, a longtime opposition leader, professor, and former first lady.
- Michel Martelly, a compas musician and entertainer whose lyrics have poked fun at the concept of the Haitian presidency.
- Yvon Neptune, an architect and ex-senator who served as prime minister under former President Jean-Bertrand Aristide.
- Leslie Voltaire, a US-educated urban planner, former minister, and government liaison to the United Nations.

Other candidates included Axan Abellard, Charles Voigt, Claire Lydie Parent, Déjean Bélizaire, Duroseau Vilaire Cluny, Eric Charles, Francois Turnier, Garaudy Laguerre, Gary Guiteau, Genard Joseph, Gerard Blot, Guy Theodore, Jacques Philippe Eugene, Jean Bertin, Jean Hector Anacacis, Josette Bijou, Kesnel Dalmacy, Leon Jeune, Mario Eddy Rodriguez, Menelas Vilsaint, Olicier Pieriche, Rene Saint-Fort, Wilkens C. Gilles, Yves Cristalin, and Paul Arthur Fleurival.

== Campaign ==
President René Préval told the UN, "It is important that we take this difficult process to a conclusion, with rigour, equality, and transparency, essential conditions for consolidating our young democracy. I therefore call on all the national stakeholders and our overseas friends so we can successfully cross this electoral crossroads together."

Two issues for candidates to answer were considered rebuilding from the earthquake earlier in the year and an outbreak of cholera less than two months before the election, which was blamed on the United Nations by many Haitians. Independent research confirmed the origin of the cholera outbreak as being linked to UN Nepalese troops, and a 2011 UN Report admitted as much. The UN alleged that the outbreak was used for "political reasons because of forthcoming elections," as the government in Haiti sent its own forces to "protect" the peacekeepers.

The election was termed in the media as a "seismic" one.

== Opinion polls ==
2 October 2010:

- Mirlande Manigat (Rally of Progressive National Democrats): 23.0%
- Charles-Henri Baker (Respect): 17.3%
- Jude Célestin (Unity): 7.8%

14 November 2010:

- Charles-Henri Baker (Respect): 24.38%
- Mirlande Manigat (Rally of Progressive National Democrats): 17.58%
- Jeune Léon (Rally for Economic Liberation): 14.51%
- Michel Martelly (Peasant Response): 14.10%

6–10 February 2011 (runoff):

- Michel Martelly (Peasant Response): 60.3%
- Mirlande Manigat (Rally of Progressive National Democrats): 38.9%

== Conduct ==
On the day of the first round of voting, Martelly and Manigat, as well as most other candidates, denounced the results as invalid by noon, before voting had even concluded. A notable exception to this denunciation was Jude Celestin.

Following demonstration and demands by the opposition to hold elections amid a parliamentary call that he can stay beyond his 7 February mandate, President René Préval issued decrees ordering the country's nine-member provisional electoral council to organise the election. However he still did not address calls for the council itself to be replaced before a vote is held. Despite the constitutional legitimacy and impartiality of the CEP having been challenged.

Some questioned whether Haiti was ready to hold an election following the earthquake that left more than a million people in makeshift camps and without IDs. There was also a fear that the election could throw the country into a political crisis due to a lack of transparency and voting fraud.

Canada had also pressured Haiti to hold elections as stipulated in its constitution. It wanted a firm commitment to holding elections by the end of the year as domestic opposition grew to incumbent President René Préval's response to the earthquake.

Due to the elections and allegedly accepted instability, Haitian security services were given special training by foreign forces.

The United Nations voted to extend MINUSTAH's mandate amid fears of instability. This was greeted with protesters in Port-au-Prince carrying banners reading "Down with the occupation," and burning the flag of Brazil, as they had the largest contingent in MINUSTAH. Despite months of relative calm after the earthquake, this represented a "chorus of opposition to René Préval, Haiti's president, and to UN forces."

Due to the cholera outbreak, there were fears that the election could be postponed. However, the head of MINUSTAH, Edmond Mulet, said that it should not be delayed as that could lead to a political vacuum with untold potential problems.

After a visit by then Secretary of State Hillary Clinton, Manigat and Martelly agreed to accept the results of the first round of voting.

During the first round of voting, two people were killed in a firefight between rival parties' supporters in Aquin, with several injured in violence across the country.

=== Post-1st round ===
There were calls for Martelly to be included in the run-off; however, he has stated that he would not take part if Célestin is also a candidate in the run-off. A recount was announced on 10 December. However, both Manigat and Martelly then rejected the proposed recount, with only Célestin accepting it. Manigat and Martelly also criticised the lack of clear procedures or a timetable.

Following a deal reached in late December 2010 to look into the vote counting process and have re-polling in certain constituencies, the run-off was postponed until at least February 2011. Pierre-Louis Opont, the director general of the Provisional Electoral Council said: "It will be materially impossible to hold the run-off on January 16. From the date of the publication of the final results of the first round, we will need at least one month to hold the run-off." He also said that a report by the Organisation of American States and a completion of review for the results that had been challenged would be needed first.

The OAS report proposed that Manigat and Martelly advance to the run-off, dropping Célestin from the second round. However, the Provisional Electoral Council rejected that suggestion on 19 January 2011. Additionally, some analyses showed that the OAS report was statistically flawed and made the recommendation to eliminate Célestin with no apparent justification. In a January 2011 report, the Center for Economic and Policy Research concluded that 71.5% of the eligible Haitian population did not vote during the first round of the election on November 28, 2010. Furthermore, from the remaining votes 8.1% were considered to be invalid, leaving only 20.1% of the votes being cast on one of the candidates in the election. The high rate of irregular votes led the CEPR to conclude that no statistics-based, non-arbitrary selection of a second-place candidate was possible. In a later August 2011 report, the CEPR further concluded that the data actually contradicted the OAS recommendation to overturn the initial vote counts and select Martelly as the second-place candidate, and that this move was not in line with normal international election resolution processes, suggesting a bias on the part of the OAS.

Célestin was reportedly likely to drop out of the run-off by himself, however, as stated by a member of his party on 25 January 2011, partially as a result of international pressure. The official withdrawal statement came on 26 January 2011.

Baby Doc returned to Haiti on 16 January 2011 in what was seen as possibly more uncertainty. Corruption and theft charges were then filed against him. Jean-Bertrand Aristide returned in March amidst concern for stability by both the runoff candidates. The rumour of his return led to several thousand of his supporters in Port-au-Prince demanding that without Aristide there should not be a second round election. The protest even reached as far as Miami, where approximately 60 protesters gathered in front of the offices of The Miami Herald. Questions were then asked about the effect the former presidents could have on the political process.

Campaigning for the second round of the presidential election officially commenced on Thursday, 17 February. While Mirlande Manigat discussed her future plans for Haiti in a hotel with reporters, Martelly took to the streets of Cap-Haïtien, the second largest city in Haiti, where he and his followers danced and sang in the streets. Martelly even went as far as to campaign in Miami in the United States of America, which is home to a large number of Haitian expatriates.

On 17 February, Wyclef Jean announced his support for Martelly in the second round of the presidential election. Wyclef Jean was also shot at and grazed by a bullet the day before the second round vote during campaigning for Martelly. He was wounded and taken to a hospital.

During voting for the second round some polling stations failed to open on time as they lacked the necessary equipment and documents.

President Barack Obama of the US asked the government of South Africa to delay former president Jean-Bertrand Aristide's attempt to return to Haiti, however, the request was rejected by Aristide himself.

== Results ==
=== President ===
The result for the first round presidential poll was announced on 3 February 2011, with the run-off set for 20 March between Manigat and Martelly.

Candidate	Party	First round		Second round	
Candidate	Party	Votes	%	Votes	%
Mirlande Manigat	Rally of Progressive National Democrats	336,878	31.37	336,747	31.74
Jude Célestin	Inite	241,462	22.48		
Michel Martelly	Repons Peyizan	234,617	21.84	716,986	67.57
Jean-Henry Céant	Renmen Ayiti	87,834	8.18		
Jacques-Édouard Alexis	Mobilization for Haitian Progress	32,932	3.07		
Charles Henri Baker	Respect	25,512	2.38		
Jean Chavannes Jeune	Christian Citizens' Alliance for the Reconstruction of Haiti	19,348	1.80		
Yves Cristalin	Lavni Organisation	17,133	1.60		
Leslie Voltaire	Ansanm Nou Fò	16,199	1.51		
Anne Marie Josette Bijou	Independent	10,782	1.00		
Génard Joseph	Solidarity	9,164	0.85		
Wilson Jeudy	Force 2010	6,076	0.57		
Yvon Neptune	Ayisyen Pou Ayiti	4,217	0.39		
Jean Hector Anacacis	Democratic Movement of the Haitian Youth	4,165	0.39		
Léon Jeune	Rally for Economic Liberation	3,738	0.35		
Axan Delson Abellard	National Rally for the Development of Haiti	3,110	0.29		
Garaudy Laguerre	Wozo Movement	2,802	0.26		
Gérard Marie Necker Blot	Platfom 16 Desanm	2,621	0.24		
Eric Smarki Charles	Party for Haitian National Evolution	2,597	0.24		
Against all		12,869	1.20	7,356	0.69
Total		1,074,056	100.00	1,061,089	100.00
Registered voters/turnout		4,694,961	–	4,694,961	–
Source: Haiti Libre, Haiti Libre

=== Chamber of Deputies ===
Party	First round			Second round			Total seats
Party	Votes	%	Seats	Votes	%	Seats	Total seats
Inite			13			33	46
Haiti in Action			4			4	8
Lavni Organisation			1			7	8
Alternative for Progress and Democracy			0			7	7
Ansanm Nou Fò			1			3	4
Konbit Pou refè Ayiti			0			3	3
Liberation Platform			0			3	3
Rally			2			1	3
Repons Peyizan			0			3	3
Christian Movement for a New Haiti			0			2	2
Pont			1			1	2
Platform of Haitian Patriots			0			1	1
Respect			0			1	1
Socialist Action Movement			0			1	1
Solidarity			0			1	1
Veye Yo			0			1	1
Independents			0			2	2
Vacant							3
Total			22			74	99
Source: IPU

=== Senate ===
Party	First round			Second round			Total seats
Party	Votes	%	Seats	Votes	%	Seats	Total seats
Inite			3			3	6
Alternative for Progress and Democracy			1			3	4
Lavni Organisation			0			1	1
Total			4			7	11
Source: IPU

=== Fraud allegations ===
Despite the Provisional Election Council sanctioning the election, protests continued the next day. Almost two-thirds of the candidates also called for the election to be annulled alleging fraud and many voters being refused ballots. Despite this, international election monitors declared the polls valid and said the results should not be invalidated. This opinion was not shared by the OAS and the CARICOM who, after a preliminary report, said that there many problems surrounding the election. Following further protests by several candidates, the UN called for calm and urged candidates to call on their supporters not to instigate trouble. It also said that a deteriorating security situation could undermine containment of the cholera epidemic. CBC News reporters also said that there was "massive fraud". Port-au-Prince had four consecutive days of protests.
