= Olivier Martelly =

Michel Olivier Martelly
- Birth name: Michel-Olivier Martelly
- Born: Miami, Florida, U.S.
- Genres: Kompa
- Occupation: Musician
- Years active: 2006–present
- Website: www.oliviermartelly.com

Michel-Olivier Martelly (French pronunciation: [miʃɛl-ɔlivje maʁteli]), better known as Olivier Martelly, is a Haitian American musician. He has a stage name, BigO.

== Early life ==
Olivier Martelly was born in Miami. His father, Michel Martelly was the 41st President of Haiti, and his mother, Sophia Saint-Rémy Martelly, was First Lady.

== Career ==
Martelly's discographies are hard to find, and as public data about him is extremely limited, his career is relatively unknown. In Haiti's 2015 presidential election, he published a song endorsing government-backed candidate Jovenel Moise in response to Wyclef Jean's endorsement of Jude Célestin. Martelly is the CEO of Big O Productions, which features Haitian artists.
