= Platform of Haitian Patriots =

The Platform of Haitian Patriots is a political party in Haiti, led by Dejean Balisaire and Himmler Rebu. In the 2010–11 general elections, the party won one seat.
