= Organization for the Future =

Political party in Haiti

Organization for the Future (Haitian Creole: Organizasyon Lavni) is a political party in Haiti, led by Yves Cristalin. In the 2010–11 general elections, the party won 7 seats.
