= Yvon Buissereth =

Haitian politician (died 2022)

Yvon Buissereth (10 September 1961 – 6 August 2022) was a Haitian politician. He was assassinated in 2022 amidst unrest in the country. A former senator from Fanmi Lavalas, he became a social housing official.

He became a senator in 2006. He represented Haiti's South Department.

He was found dead along with his nephew by their burned vehicle. Officials blamed gang violence. He and his nephew were killed in Laboule 12, a commune in Pétion-Ville. Politician Eric-Jean Baptiste was killed a couple of months later in the same area.
