= Rally of Progressive National Democrats =

Political party in Haiti

Rally of Progressive National Democrats Rassemblement des démocrates nationaux progressistes
- Leader: Vacant
- Founder: Leslie Manigat
- Founded: 1979
- Headquarters: Port-au-Prince, Haiti
- Ideology: Haitian nationalism Christian democracy Conservatism
- Political position: Centre-right
- International affiliation: Centrist Democrat International
- Regional affiliation: Christian Democrat Organization of America
- Colors: Green
- Chamber of Deputies: 0 / 119
- Senate: 0 / 30

Website
- rdnp-haiti.org

The Rally of Progressive National Democrats (French: Rassemblement des démocrates nationaux progressistes, RDNP) is a political party in Haiti.

== History ==
The RDNP was founded in 1979 by then exiled president Leslie Manigat. It was registered officially as political party on 25 May 1987, but only on 15 July 1987 was it recognized by the electoral authorities.

In the Haitian presidential election in 1988, Leslie Manigat wins with 50.2% of the popular vote and was elected president. In the parliamentary elections in 1990, RDNP elected only one seat in Senate. In Haitian presidential elections in February 2006, its candidate Leslie Manigat won 12.4% of the popular vote. In the 2006 Senate elections, the party picked up 10.7% of the popular vote, yet only 1 out of 30 Senators. In the 2006 Chamber of Deputies elections, the party won 4 out of 99 seats. In the Haitian presidential elections of 28 November 2010, the RDNP presented as candidate Mirlande Manigat, wife of the RDNP's founder. She won the first round by carrying 31.37%, and in the second ballot with Michel Martelly, she lost with only 31.74%. However, in the Parliamentary elections, the RDNP lost the seat that it had in the Chamber.

In 2013, the party became a member of the Patriotic Movement of the Democratic Opposition (Mouvement Patriotique de l'Opposition Démocratique, MOPOD), a coalition of parties that oppose to President Michel Martelly.

In 2018, Eric Jean Baptiste was promoted as the new general secretary of the party. Baptiste was later assassinated on the way to his home in the Laboule 12 area of Port-au-Prince on 28 October 2022, when his car was ambushed.
