= Rah =

RAH or Rah may refer to:

== Rah ==
- Rah (slang), British English slang for a young snob
- Rah, claimed by James Churchward to be the Naacal sun-god
- Ra (island), Vanuatu, often spelled Rah
- Rah Rah (band), Regina, Saskatchewan, Canada
- Rah (Mark Murphy album), 1961
- Rah (Billy Hart album), 1988

== RAH ==
- Right atrial hypertrophy
- Royal Albert Hall, England
- Royal Alexandra Hospital (Edmonton), Canada
- Royal Alexandra Hospital, Paisley, hospital in Scotland
- Royal Alexandra Hospital, Rhyl, hospital in Wales
- Royal Adelaide Hospital, Australia
- Real Academia de la Historia (Royal Academy of History), Spain
- Richard Anthony Hewson's 1970s RAH band
- Robert A. Heinlein, science fiction author
- Boeing–Sikorsky RAH-66 Comanche, a military plane

== See also ==
- Oorah (battle cry)
- RAHS (disambiguation)
- Rah-rah (disambiguation)
- Ra (disambiguation)
