= Regional health authority =

Regional health authority may refer to:

- Regional health authority (Norway)
- Regional health authority (Trinidad and Tobago)
- Regional health authority (United Kingdom)

== See also ==
- Health regions of Canada, many of which have "regional health authority" as a part of their legal title
