= Eric Jean Baptiste =

Haitian politician (1970–2022)

Personal details
- Born: 13 August 1970 Port-au-Prince, Haiti
- Died: 28 October 2022 (aged 52) Port-au-Prince, Haiti
- Party: Mouvement Action Socialiste (MAS) (Before 2018); Rally of Progressive National Democrats (RDNP) (2018–2022)
- Profession: Entrepreneur

Eric Jean Baptiste (13 August 1970 – 28 October 2022) was a Haitian politician and entrepreneur who served as the leader of the Rally of Progressive National Democrats from 16 August 2018 until his death on 28 October 2022. He was a candidate in the 2015 presidential election, representing the Mouvement Action Socialiste (MAS) party.

== Biography ==
Eric Jean Baptiste was born in Port-au-Prince, Haiti. He was the youngest child in a family of seven children. Jean Baptiste was brought up in a Christian family. On 15 March 1990, Jean Baptiste created his first company, lottery business Père Eternel Loto, when he was 19 years old. On 24 January 2018, Jean Baptiste left the Mouvement Action Socialiste party. He was the leader of the Rally of Progressive National Democrats from 16 August 2018 until his assassination.

== Death ==
Jean Baptiste was assassinated on the way to his home in the Laboule 12 area on 28 October 2022, when his car was shot up. The Ti Makak and Toto gangs had been fighting for control of the area at the time of his death. His bodyguard was also killed in the attack. Jean Baptiste had survived a shooting in 2018, suffering a bullet wound. Former senator Yvon Buissereth was assassinated and his body was set on fire in the same area a few months earlier.
