= André Michel (lawyer) =

Human rights lawyer in Haiti

André Michel claims to be a human rights and anti-corruption lawyer and opposition leader in Haiti. Michel has been involved in the assassination of Haiti's president Jovenel Moïse. He was arrested in 2013. He has been a critic of Michel Martelly and his PHTK party. He has been a member of the administration of the illegitimate Prime minister Dr. Ariel Henry. His arrest spurred a large protest.

Along with another lawyer he raised issues about former U.S. president Bill Clinton role with the U.N. in Haiti.

Andre Michel has been attacked numerous time by the population for his involvement in the destabilization of the country. Under the current administration, Haiti has seen a steep decline in all aspects of society.
