= Bois Moquette =

Bois Moquette Bwa Moket
- Location in Haiti
- Coordinates: 18°27′50″N 72°30′42″W
- Country: Haiti
- Department: Ouest
- Arrondissement: Jacmel
- Elevation: 372 m (1,220 ft)
- Time zone: UTC-5 (UTC)

Bois Moquette (French pronunciation: [bwa mɔkɛt]), is a town in the Jacmel Arrondissement, in the Ouest department of Haiti.
