= Rara =

Rara or RARA may refer to:

- Rara (album), studio album by Juana Molina
- Rara music, a form of festival music originating in Haiti
- Rara festival, a Lent carnival in Haiti
- Rara Lake, lake in Nepal
- Rara, Nepal, a village in Karnali Zone
- Rara National Park, a protected area in Nepal
- Retinoic acid receptor alpha, known as RARA or RAR-alpha, a human gene
- Rara (film), a 2016 Chilean film
- RaRa, short for Revolutionary Anti-Racist Action, a Dutch terrorist organisation
- Rara (grape), another name for the Italian wine grape Uva Rara
- Rara, Iran, a village in Isfahan Province
- rara.com, a music streaming service between 2011 and 2015
- Rara Thomas (born 2002), American football player
- Opera Rara, British record label
- 12522 Rara, asteroid named after student prize-winner
- Ra Ra Riot, an American indie rock band from Syracuse, New York
- Rara, the nickname of Malaysian politician Young Syefura Othman
- rara, a Latin word meaning "rare", used as the second component in many plant or animal binomial names, cf. List of Latin phrases (R)
- Rara Island, one of the Sloss Islands of Papua New Guinea

== See also ==
- Rara avis (disambiguation)
- Rah-rah (disambiguation)
- Ra, ra, the start of the chorus to the song "Bad Romance" by Lady Gaga
