= Ra (Javanese) =

ra
- ꦫ
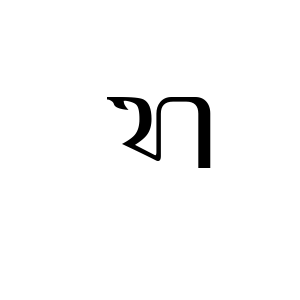
- Aksara nglegena

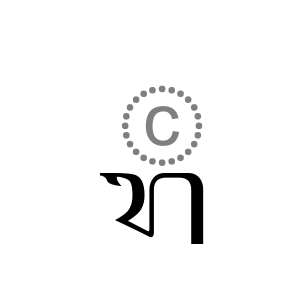
- Aksara pasangan

Usage
- Writing system: Javanese script
- Latin orthography: ra
- Sound values: [r]
- In Unicode: A9AB

ꦫ is one of the syllables in the Javanese script that represents the sounds /rɔ/, /ra/. It is transliterated to Latin as "ra", and sometimes in Indonesian orthography as "ro". It has another form (pasangan), which is ◌꧀ꦫ, but represented by a single Unicode code point, U+A9AB.

== Pasangan ==
Its pasangan form ◌꧀ꦫ, is located on the bottom side of the previous syllable. The pasangan only occurs if a word is ended with a consonant, and the next word starts with 'r', for example ꦲꦤꦏ꧀ꦫꦗ - anak raja (king's child). If it is located between a consonant and a vocal, it doesn't form a pasangan. Instead it uses a special panjingan called a cakra (ꦿ) or cakra keret (ꦽ), for example ꦒꦿꦶꦪ - griya (house).

== Murda ==
The letter ꦫ has a murda form, ꦬ.

== Final consonant ==
ꦫ cannot became final consonant (e.g. ꦫ꧀). It is replaced by layar (ꦂ). For example: ꦭꦪꦂ - layar (sail), not ꦭꦪꦫ꧀

== Honorific form ==
Some writers replaced ꦫ with ꦬ (ra agung) when addressing or discussing royal persons.

== Glyphs ==
Nglegena forms				Pasangan forms			
ꦫ ra	ꦫꦃ rah	ꦫꦁ rang	ꦫꦂ rar	◌꧀ꦫ -ra	◌꧀ꦫꦃ -rah	◌꧀ꦫꦁ -rang	◌꧀ꦫꦂ -rar
ꦫꦺ re	ꦫꦺꦃ reh	ꦫꦺꦁ reng	ꦫꦺꦂ rer	◌꧀ꦫꦺ -re	◌꧀ꦫꦺꦃ -reh	◌꧀ꦫꦺꦁ -reng	◌꧀ꦫꦺꦂ -rer
ꦫꦼ rê	ꦫꦼꦃ rêh	ꦫꦼꦁ rêng	ꦫꦼꦂ rêr	◌꧀ꦫꦼ -rê	◌꧀ꦫꦼꦃ -rêh	◌꧀ꦫꦼꦁ -rêng	◌꧀ꦫꦼꦂ -rêr
ꦫꦶ ri	ꦫꦶꦃ rih	ꦫꦶꦁ ring	ꦫꦶꦂ rir	◌꧀ꦫꦶ -ri	◌꧀ꦫꦶꦃ -rih	◌꧀ꦫꦶꦁ -ring	◌꧀ꦫꦶꦂ -rir
ꦫꦺꦴ ro	ꦫꦺꦴꦃ roh	ꦫꦺꦴꦁ rong	ꦫꦺꦴꦂ ror	◌꧀ꦫꦺꦴ -ro	◌꧀ꦫꦺꦴꦃ -roh	◌꧀ꦫꦺꦴꦁ -rong	◌꧀ꦫꦺꦴꦂ -ror
ꦫꦸ ru	ꦫꦸꦃ ruh	ꦫꦸꦁ rung	ꦫꦸꦂ rur	◌꧀ꦫꦸ -ru	◌꧀ꦫꦸꦃ -ruh	◌꧀ꦫꦸꦁ -rung	◌꧀ꦫꦸꦂ -rur
ꦫꦿ rra	ꦫꦿꦃ rrah	ꦫꦿꦁ rrang	ꦫꦿꦂ rrar	◌꧀ꦫꦿ -rra	◌꧀ꦫꦿꦃ -rrah	◌꧀ꦫꦿꦁ -rrang	◌꧀ꦫꦿꦂ -rrar
ꦫꦿꦺ rre	ꦫꦿꦺꦃ rreh	ꦫꦿꦺꦁ rreng	ꦫꦿꦺꦂ rrer	◌꧀ꦫꦿꦺ -rre	◌꧀ꦫꦿꦺꦃ -rreh	◌꧀ꦫꦿꦺꦁ -rreng	◌꧀ꦫꦿꦺꦂ -rrer
ꦫꦽ rrê	ꦫꦽꦃ rrêh	ꦫꦽꦁ rrêng	ꦫꦽꦂ rrêr	◌꧀ꦫꦽ -rrê	◌꧀ꦫꦽꦃ -rrêh	◌꧀ꦫꦽꦁ -rrêng	◌꧀ꦫꦽꦂ -rrêr
ꦫꦿꦶ rri	ꦫꦿꦶꦃ rrih	ꦫꦿꦶꦁ rring	ꦫꦿꦶꦂ rrir	◌꧀ꦫꦿꦶ -rri	◌꧀ꦫꦿꦶꦃ -rrih	◌꧀ꦫꦿꦶꦁ -rring	◌꧀ꦫꦿꦶꦂ -rrir
ꦫꦿꦺꦴ rro	ꦫꦿꦺꦴꦃ rroh	ꦫꦿꦺꦴꦁ rrong	ꦫꦿꦺꦴꦂ rror	◌꧀ꦫꦿꦺꦴ -rro	◌꧀ꦫꦿꦺꦴꦃ -rroh	◌꧀ꦫꦿꦺꦴꦁ -rrong	◌꧀ꦫꦿꦺꦴꦂ -rror
ꦫꦿꦸ rru	ꦫꦿꦸꦃ rruh	ꦫꦿꦸꦁ rrung	ꦫꦿꦸꦂ rrur	◌꧀ꦫꦿꦸ -rru	◌꧀ꦫꦿꦸꦃ -rruh	◌꧀ꦫꦿꦸꦁ -rrung	◌꧀ꦫꦿꦸꦂ -rrur
ꦫꦾ rya	ꦫꦾꦃ ryah	ꦫꦾꦁ ryang	ꦫꦾꦂ ryar	◌꧀ꦫꦾ -rya	◌꧀ꦫꦾꦃ -ryah	◌꧀ꦫꦾꦁ -ryang	◌꧀ꦫꦾꦂ -ryar
ꦫꦾꦺ rye	ꦫꦾꦺꦃ ryeh	ꦫꦾꦺꦁ ryeng	ꦫꦾꦺꦂ ryer	◌꧀ꦫꦾꦺ -rye	◌꧀ꦫꦾꦺꦃ -ryeh	◌꧀ꦫꦾꦺꦁ -ryeng	◌꧀ꦫꦾꦺꦂ -ryer
ꦫꦾꦼ ryê	ꦫꦾꦼꦃ ryêh	ꦫꦾꦼꦁ ryêng	ꦫꦾꦼꦂ ryêr	◌꧀ꦫꦾꦼ -ryê	◌꧀ꦫꦾꦼꦃ -ryêh	◌꧀ꦫꦾꦼꦁ -ryêng	◌꧀ꦫꦾꦼꦂ -ryêr
ꦫꦾꦶ ryi	ꦫꦾꦶꦃ ryih	ꦫꦾꦶꦁ rying	ꦫꦾꦶꦂ ryir	◌꧀ꦫꦾꦶ -ryi	◌꧀ꦫꦾꦶꦃ -ryih	◌꧀ꦫꦾꦶꦁ -rying	◌꧀ꦫꦾꦶꦂ -ryir
ꦫꦾꦺꦴ ryo	ꦫꦾꦺꦴꦃ ryoh	ꦫꦾꦺꦴꦁ ryong	ꦫꦾꦺꦴꦂ ryor	◌꧀ꦫꦾꦺꦴ -ryo	◌꧀ꦫꦾꦺꦴꦃ -ryoh	◌꧀ꦫꦾꦺꦴꦁ -ryong	◌꧀ꦫꦾꦺꦴꦂ -ryor
ꦫꦾꦸ ryu	ꦫꦾꦸꦃ ryuh	ꦫꦾꦸꦁ ryung	ꦫꦾꦸꦂ ryur	◌꧀ꦫꦾꦸ -ryu	◌꧀ꦫꦾꦸꦃ -ryuh	◌꧀ꦫꦾꦸꦁ -ryung	◌꧀ꦫꦾꦸꦂ -ryur

== Unicode block ==
Javanese script was added to the Unicode Standard in October, 2009 with the release of version 5.2.

Javanese^{[1]}^{[2]} Official Unicode Consortium code chart (PDF)
	0	1	2	3	4	5	6	7	8	9	A	B	C	D	E	F
U+A98x	ꦀ	ꦁ	ꦂ	ꦃ	ꦄ	ꦅ	ꦆ	ꦇ	ꦈ	ꦉ	ꦊ	ꦋ	ꦌ	ꦍ	ꦎ	ꦏ
U+A99x	ꦐ	ꦑ	ꦒ	ꦓ	ꦔ	ꦕ	ꦖ	ꦗ	ꦘ	ꦙ	ꦚ	ꦛ	ꦜ	ꦝ	ꦞ	ꦟ
U+A9Ax	ꦠ	ꦡ	ꦢ	ꦣ	ꦤ	ꦥ	ꦦ	ꦧ	ꦨ	ꦩ	ꦪ	ꦫ	ꦬ	ꦭ	ꦮ	ꦯ
U+A9Bx	ꦰ	ꦱ	ꦲ	꦳	ꦴ	ꦵ	ꦶ	ꦷ	ꦸ	ꦹ	ꦺ	ꦻ	ꦼ	ꦽ	ꦾ	ꦿ
U+A9Cx	꧀	꧁	꧂	꧃	꧄	꧅	꧆	꧇	꧈	꧉	꧊	꧋	꧌	꧍		ꧏ
U+A9Dx	꧐	꧑	꧒	꧓	꧔	꧕	꧖	꧗	꧘	꧙					꧞	꧟
Notes 1.As of Unicode version 17.0 2.Grey areas indicate non-assigned code points
