= Rosario Advent High School =

High school in Batangas, Philippines

Location
- Rosario, Batangas; Philippines
- Coordinates: 13°50′42″N 121°12′05″E

Information
- Website: Rosario Advent High School

Rosario Advent High School is a school in Rosario, Batangas, Philippines.
