= Jean-Charles Moïse =

Haitian politician

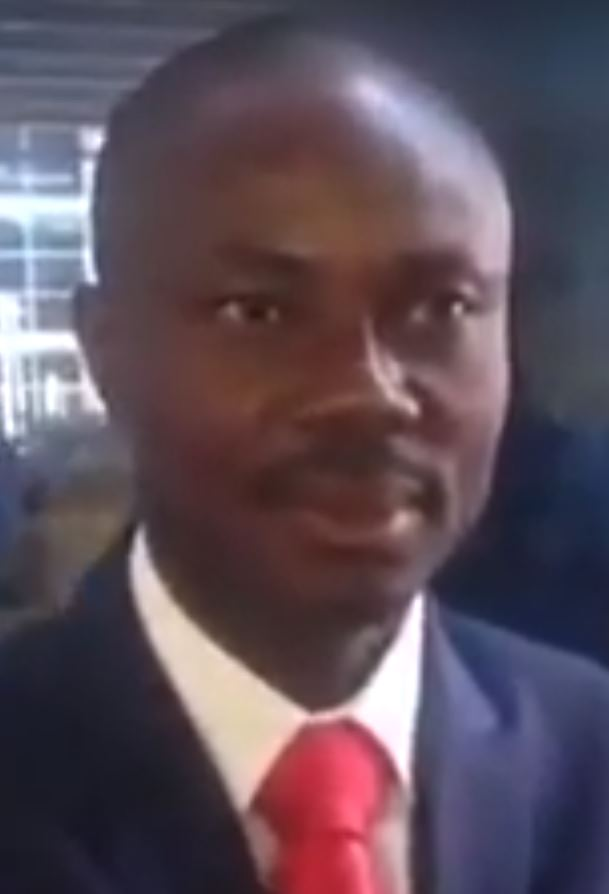
- Moïse in 2016

Senator for Nord
- In office 2009–2015
- President: René Préval; Michel Martelly

Personal details
- Born: 20 April 1967 (age 59) Milot, Haiti
- Party: Platfòm Pitit Desalin
- Children: 6

Jean-Charles Moïse (born 20 April 1967) is a Haitian politician. He is the leader of the Pitit Desalin political party, and was a candidate for President of Haiti in 2015, and again in 2016, when the presidential elections were redone. He served 3 consecutive terms as the mayor of Milot, in the north of Haiti, and one term as Senator for the Nord Department. He resigned from the Senate with 2 years left on his mandate in protest to allegedly having been offered a bribe to stop his opposition against then President Michel Martelly. Prior to the founding of the Pitit Desalin party, Moïse was a member of the INITE party.

== Biography ==
Jean-Charles completed his studies at the National School of Milot and the Lycée Philippe Guerrier in Cap-Haïtien. He studied accounting science at Adventist University Diquini. He was the mayor of Milot (year unknown) and senator later during his life. He was elected to the Senate of Haiti in 2009. In 2015, he resigned as Senator in order to run for the presidency. He received 14.22% of the popular vote, ranking 3rd, after Jovenel Moïse (PHTK) and Jude Célestin (LAPEH).

Politically, Jean-Charles describes himself as a "restorative socialist." He has cited Jean-Jacques Dessalines and Fidel Castro as his primary and secondary philosophical and ideological influences, respectively. His political program is based on the three core tenets of sovereignty, solidarity, and prosperity.

During the Autumn 2022 wave of protests calling for the resignation of Ariel Henry and against Henry's request for foreign military invasion to keep him in power, Jean-Charles called on his followers to arm themselves with "machetes to lead the revolution."

In March 2024, Moïse Jean-Charles proposed the establishment of a Presidential Council after the support of other parties, following the gang crisis in Haiti.

== Deportation from the United States ==
In January 2022, Jean-Charles was detained in the United States on his way back to Haiti from a visit to Nigeria and held overnight. He was then deported, had his American visa cancelled, and was banned from re-entering the United States for another 5 years. The deportation was allegedly due to Jean-Charles' relationship with Venezuelan leader Nicolás Maduro and a meeting he had with Diosdado Cabello, a "reputed head of a Venezuelan drug cartel", as well as other "key members of the Venezuelan regime".

== Electoral records ==
Haitian presidential election, 2015:

| Candidate | Party | First round | | Second round | |
| Candidate | Party | Votes | % | Votes | % |
|---|---|---|---|---|---|
| Jovenel Moïse | Haitian Tèt Kale Party | 508,761 | 32.81 | | |
| Jude Célestin | Ligue Alternative pour le Progrès et l'Emancipation Haïtienne | 392,782 | 25.27 | | |
| Moïse Jean-Charles | Platfòm Pitit Desalin | 222,109 | 14.27 | | |
| Maryse Narcisse | Fanmi Lavalas | 108,844 | 7.05 | | |
| Eric Jean Baptiste | Mouvement Action Socialiste | 56,427 | 3.63 | | |
Source: CEP Haiti
