= Ra (Eloy album) =

Studio album by Eloy
- Released: 15 March 1988
- Recorded: 1986–1987
- Studio: Horus Sound, Hanover; Fairland, Bochum; Hansa, Berlin; Studio 55, Mülheim; Klangwerkstatt, Düsseldorf
- Genre: Space rock, progressive rock
- Length: 41:36
- Label: ACI; FM Revolver (UK)
- Producer: Frank Bornemann

Eloy chronology
Code Name: Wild Geese (1984)	Ra (1988)	Rarities (1991)

Alternative cover
- CD special edition cover, based on a Patrick Woodroffe painting

Alternative cover
- 2023 remastered CD reissue cover

Singles from Ra
- 1. "Sensations / Hero" Released: 1988; 2. "Rainbow / Invasion Of A Megaforce" Released: 1988

Audio sample
- "Sensations": file; help

Professional ratings
Review scores
Source	Rating
ArtRock	2/10 stars
ArtRock	7/10 stars
Hellfire	8/10 stars
Kerrang!	3/5 stars
Musik Reviews	Positive
RockTimes	Mixed

Ra is the thirteenth studio album by the German rock band Eloy, released in 1988.

It is a concept album conceived by Frank Bornemann, critically examining the topic of genetic manipulation and the human desire for immortality.

Ra marked the band's reformation as a duo, since they disbanded in late 1984. Eloy's long-time leader and core member Frank Bornemann chose keyboardist Michael Gerlach as his only stable bandmate, while also co-operating with various guest musicians.

== Synopsis ==
Rendition according to the album's lyrics

Humanity has found the key to eternal life, but the protagonist refuses to celebrate it out of fear for the uncertain and possibly dystopian future it brings ("Voyager of the Future Race"). The protagonist expresses the desire to return to a more natural, untainted state of being, seeking meaning and connection in the face of isolation and despair ("Sensations"). Then, a divine voice presents dreams as a refuge and a guide to personal growth and understanding, a medium for the protagonist to feel safe and free ("Dreams").

Both the divine spirit and the protagonist urge humanity to reconsider their relationship with nature and take steps towards a more sustainable future, as crime and environmental degradation is everywhere ("Invasion of a Megaforce"). Suggesting that happiness and peace can be achieved by seeking out and embracing the beauty and possibilities in life, the protagonist encourages humanity to metaphorically "fly on the rainbow" in order to achieve a higher spiritual state ("Rainbow"). Finally, a hero comes forth, with his journey being both a source of immense accomplishment and profound personal struggle. As he fights to save humanity, his agony is intense, and the outcome of his effort is uncertain ("Hero").

== Background ==
After a turbulent 1984 which saw the release of two albums, Metromania and Code Name: Wild Geese, Frank Bornemann took the responsibility to disband Eloy near the end of the year, after failing to find a common ground with his bandmates regarding artistic positions and the band's future.

In 1985, Bornemann worked as a producer in his own Horus Sound Studio as well as other studios around Germany. After almost a year of absence from creating music, he began writing new material and looking for a keyboardist to co-operate with.

Achim Gieseler was the first person he chose to work with, composing the songs "Invasion of a Megaforce" and "Rainbow". As Giesler wanted to pursue other projects, Bornemann had to search for another musician to be his stable partner.

When Bornemann came across Michael Gerlach in Casablanca studio in Berlin, he was impressed by his skills and musical taste, and asked him to be his full-time partner. Gerlach accepted, and the two of them slowly composed the rest of the album. Throughout this process, Bornemann continued to work as a producer and Gerlach as both a session musician and a producer, thus Ra had to be recorded in various studios throughout 1986 and 1987, whenever they had the opportunity.

== Artwork ==
The album's front cover is a painting by Michael Narten, a graphic designer who would later work again for Eloy, as well as for bands like Kraan, Scorpions, Triumvirat and Hoelderlin. A CD-only special edition of Ra with alternative cover was also released, based on a painting by Patrick Woodroffe, originally used as the cover of the book The Bull and the Spear by Michael Moorcock, released in 1973. That version of the album was later re-released with the cover printed on the disc too, resembling a picture disc.

The 2023 remastered reissue uses the original cover by Michael Narten, but replaces the band logo with the classic 3D calligraphic version of it.

== Reception ==
Ra quickly sold 60,000 units, and entered the German charts on 21 March 1988, charting for one week and peaking at the 62nd position. Since Bornemann decided to not set up Eloy as a full band, there was no supporting tour; they only played one live gig in Ahlen, on 20 March 1988. That concert was recorded by a private TV station, broadcast only once, and remains one of the most popular Eloy bootlegs.

== Track listing ==
All lyrics by Frank Bornemann, music by Bornemann and Michael Gerlach except where noted.

No.	Title	Music	Length
1.	"Voyager of the Future Race"		8:51
2.	"Sensations"		4:46
3.	"Dreams"		8:05
4.	"Invasion of a Megaforce"	Frank Bornemann, Achim Gieseler	7:42
5.	"Rainbow"	Frank Bornemann, Achim Gieseler	5:21
6.	"Hero"		6:51
Total length:			41:36

== Personnel ==
All information according to the album's liner notes, numbers in parentheses indicate specific tracks.

Eloy

- Frank Bornemann: guitar, lead vocals, backing vocals
- Michael Gerlach: keyboards, drums, synth-bass

Guest musicians

- Achim Gieseler: keyboards (4, 5)
- Stefan Höls: bass (4), backing vocals (3, 5)
- Darryl van Raalte: fretless bass (3)
- Paul Harriman: bass (2)
- Anette Stangenberg: vocals (3, 4, 5)
- Diana Baden: whispers (3)
- Tommy Newton: additional guitars (2)
- Udo Dahmen: drums (4)
- Sue Wist: vocal intro (1)

Production

- Frank Bornemann: production
- Fritz Hilpert: engineering, mixing

Artwork

- Michael Narten: painting, graphic design (original cover)
- Patrick Woodroffe: painting (alternative cover)

== Charts ==
Chart (1988)	Peak position
German Albums (Offizielle Top 100)	62
