= Fabrice Rouzier =

Haitian musician

- Also known as: Ti Wouzye
- Born: March 6, 1967 (age 59); Port-au-Prince, Haiti
- Genres: Twoubadou, Compas
- Occupations: Musician, producer, marketing manager
- Instruments: Keyboardist, Pianist, Accordion
- Years active: 1984–present
- Labels: Rhythm & Harmony Records
- Formerly of: Mizik Mizik

Fabrice Rouzier is a Haitian pianist, producer, and entrepreneur who has been in the Haitian music industry for more than 20 years.

== Early years ==
Fabrice Rouzier was born in Hôpital du Canapé-Vert in Port-au-Prince. He has lived in Bois Moquette, where he has a recording studio. He currently resides in Pétion-Ville, where he has spent most of his life.

== Musical career ==
Fabrice Rouzier began playing piano with his aunt Marguerite Borno at the age of four. By 1984, he was playing and recording with musicians and producers including Hans Peters, Bobby Denis, and Patrick Dejean . He started his career in the early 80's and in 1986, he joined, Keke Belizaire, Mano Obas, Choupite Jacquette and other musicians to launch the musical band, Mizik Mizik. The band has released the classic albums, "Blakawout"(Blackout) in 2001 and "Paradi nan Lanfè"(Paradise in Hell) in 2008. Rouzier is also the master producer of the "Haiti Troubadours" CD series.

== Musical influence ==
Over the course of his career, Fabrice has recorded and collaborated on over 300 albums . He has greatly influenced the development of “Compas Nouvelle Generation” and helped launch the career of many well-known Haitian musicians, including Emeline Michel, Michel Martelly, Beethova Obas, Boukman Eksperyans, BélO, Tifane, Jude Jean, Jahnesta, and many others. Rouzier is greatly known as one of the 'Twoubadou Movement' leaders for revitalizing the genre, along with Keke Belizaire. As of 2005, he is one of the forces behind the young record label “Soleil Sound” that has recorded "Haiti Troubadours", BélO, and Nickenson Prud'Homme's upcoming album. He has also produced the first solo albums of crooner Jude Jean and of newcomer Tifane.

== Other work ==
In 2006, Fabrice was the musical director for the Organization of American States (OAS) concert for peace held in Port-au-Prince, Haiti.

Fabrice Rouzier is also the Sales and Marketing manager of Sun Auto S.A., which is the exclusive distributor in Haïti of General Motors, Honda and Hyundai automobiles..
