= Torolf Raa =

Norwegian diplomat

Torolf Raa (born 2 May 1933) is a Norwegian diplomat.

Raa was born in Bergen, and graduated BA from Copenhagen School of Economics. Raa was a postgraduate student at the College of Europe, and received his MA in Political Science, from UC Berkeley. Raa started working for the Norwegian Ministry of Foreign Affairs in 1963, and was the Norwegian ambassador to Iraq from 1983 to 1988. Raa was then the Norwegian ambassador to Indonesia from 1988 to 1994, chief negotiator to the WTO from 1994 to 1997, and ambassador to South Korea from 1997 to 2001. Raa was associate partner of Norscan Partners, Oslo, from 2001 to 2007.
