= André Apaid =

Haitian businessman

André Apaid Jr. is a businessman in Haiti known for leading the Group of 184, a coalition which forced Jean-Bertrand Aristide from power in 2004 through a coup d'état in collaboration with the United States. According to Guy Philippe, Apaid and other businessmen financed and met with Philippe and other leaders of the paramilitaries which took up arms to overthrow Aristide. Apaid is the head of Alpha Industries, one of the largest assembly factories in Haiti, as well as a member of both Initiative de la Société Civile and Fondation Nouvelle Haiti.
