= Group of 184 =

The Group of 184 was a group of Haitian individuals and organizations in a variety of sectors, ranging from business and the economy to media and education, that was united in opposition to Jean-Bertrand Aristide and his Fanmi Lavalas party. The name derives from the number of organizations in the group, and is frequently shortened to G184. It was formed specifically to oppose Aristide's government and was led by André Apaid, a Haitian businessman.

== Origins ==
The Haiti Democracy Project (HDP) is a Washington, D.C.–based non-profit think tank created by Haitian-Americans to create a "more proactive and effective U.S. policy toward Haiti." It viewed Aristide's government as corrupt and ineffective. This view led to allegations that the HDP created G184, which have been refuted by the HDP director, James R. Morrell. It has also been alleged repeatedly that G184 was formed by the U.S. International Republican Institute to engineer an anti-Aristide coup.

== Associated groups ==
All members of Haiti's Initiative de la Societe Civile (ISC) group are members of the Group of 184. The European Commission worked with the ISC from 2001 to 2003 on a Human Rights and Democracy project, and donated 773,000 Euros annually during that period. The EC donation was dispersed among ISC-designated "human rights groups" in Haiti. Of the 14 groups that received grants, 7 were members of G184.

== Actions ==
- 2002
  - December – creation of G184, allegedly by HDP.
- 2003
  - January 23 – Port-au-Prince – G184 calls a general strike; however, only upper and middle class businesses participate in the strike.
  - November 14 – Port-au-Prince – G184 led an anti-Aristide demonstration outside the national palace but were outnumbered by Aristide supporters. Tear gas was used by Haitian police to disperse the groups, and two G184 members were arrested for weapons possession. The actions of the Haitian police caused the event to be portrayed internationally as evidence of Aristide's tyrannical rule.
  - December 11 – Port-au-Prince – G184 and the Democratic Convergence opposition front led a march to the capital. Aristide supporters feared a coup attempt and gathered at the palace. The marchers did try to break through the palace barriers but were repulsed by teargas. This was also viewed in the US as repression of the right to protest in Haiti, and on December 12 the US Embassy withdrew from Haiti.
- 2004
  - January 16 – Port-au-Prince – G184 led a demonstration outside the UN headquarters, urging the UN to increase security measures in the capital.
  - February 29 – Port-au-Prince – coup d'état removed Aristide from power in Haiti, accomplishing G184's primary objective.
- 2005
  - July 6 – Port-au-Prince – due to continued G184 pressure on the UN to increase its police actions, a raid is carried out on the neighborhood of Cité Soleil in which 23 civilians were killed.
