= Michel Martelly =

President of Haiti from 2011 to 2016

- Martelly in 2011

47th President of Haiti
- In office 14 May 2011 – 7 February 2016
- Prime Minister: See list: Jean-Max Bellerive Garry Conille Laurent Lamothe Florence Duperval Guillaume (acting) Evans Paul
- Preceded by: René Préval
- Succeeded by: Evans Paul (acting); Jovenel Moïse

Personal details
- Born: Michel Joseph Martelly; 12 February 1961 (age 65) Port-au-Prince, Haiti
- Party: Repons Peyizan
- Spouses: Unnamed first wife (until 1986; divorced); Sophia Martelly (m. 1987)
- Children: 4, including Olivier
- Website: Official website
- Musical career
- Genre: Compas
- Occupations: Musician; composer
- Instruments: Vocals; keyboard
- Years active: 1988–2011; 2016–present

Michel Joseph Martelly (French pronunciation: [miʃɛl ʒozɛf maʁtɛli]; born 12 February 1961) is a Haitian musician and politician who served as the 47th president of Haiti from 2011 until the end of his term in 2016. On 20 August 2024, the United States sanctioned him for trafficking drugs, in particular, cocaine, into the United States, and for sponsoring several gangs based in Haiti.

Martelly was one of Haiti's best-known musicians for over a decade, going by the stage name Sweet Micky. For business and musical reasons, Martelly has moved a number of times between the United States and Haiti. When travelling to the United States, Martelly mostly stays in Florida. After his presidency, Martelly returned to his former band and sang a carnival méringue entitled "Bal Bannann nan" (Give Her the Banana), as a mocking response to Liliane Pierre Paul, a famous Haitian female journalist in Port-au-Prince.

As a singer and keyboardist, "Sweet Micky" is known for his Kompa music, a style of Haitian dance music sung predominantly in the Haitian Creole language, but he blended this with other styles. Martelly popularized a "new generation" of kompas with smaller bands relying on synthesizers and electronic instruments. From 1989 to 2008, Martelly recorded over a dozen studio albums and a number of live CDs. As a musician and club owner in Haiti in the late 1980s and early 1990s, Martelly became associated with the neo-Duvalierist Haitian military and police, including figures such as police chief Michel François, and he agreed with the 1991 Haitian coup d'état against Jean-Bertrand Aristide. In 1995, after Aristide had been restored to office, Martelly's name appeared on a hit list of coup supporters, and he stayed away from Haiti for almost a year. During this time, he released a song, "Prezidan" (on the album Pa Manyen), "an exuberant ditty that called for a president who played compas". However, he did not run for political office until 2010, when he became a candidate for President of Haiti.

After the catastrophic earthquake, Martelly won the 2010–11 Haitian general election for his party Repons Peyizan (Farmers' Response Party), after a run-off against candidate Mirlande Manigat. Martelly had come in third in the first round of the election, until the Organization of American States forced Jude Célestin to withdraw due to alleged fraud. Martelly assumed his position of the President of Haiti on 14 May 2011 after René Préval retired to his home in Marmelade. His election campaign included a promise to reinstate the nation's military, which had been abolished in the 1990s by Jean-Bertrand Aristide. He resigned as president in February 2016. He was sanctioned by the Canadian government, which accuses him of involvement in human rights violations and supporting criminal gangs, on 17 November 2022.

For the political scientist Frédéric Thomas, the accession to power of Michel Martelly in 2011 marked the beginning of a "form of legal banditry" and constitutes a key step in the process of decay of the Haitian state.

== Early life ==
Martelly was born in Côtes-de-Fer, the son of Gerard Martelly, a Shell Oil executive and Marie Madeleine Martelly (née De Pradines, b. 1931 – d. 21 October 2016). On his mother's side, his grandfather Auguste de Pradines was a troubadour who wrote comic protest songs against the 1915–34 United States occupation of Haiti. After graduating from high school at the Institution Saint Louis de Gonzague, Martelly enlisted in the Haitian Military Academy, but (according to Martelly) was expelled after impregnating the daughter of a general. In 1984, he moved to the United States and worked in construction and briefly attended a community college in Miami. In 1986, after one semester, he divorced his first wife, an American citizen, and returned to Haiti just as Jean-Claude Duvalier, then president-for-life, was heading into exile. In 1987, Martelly returned to Miami with his then-girlfriend, Sophia Saint-Rémy, whom he later married in a small ceremony in Miami, Florida. They returned to Haiti in 1988.

Upon his return to Haiti, Martelly had his first breakthrough in the music industry when he began playing keyboard as a fill-in musician in local venues in Pétion-Ville and Kenscoff, upscale suburbs of Port-au-Prince. Martelly "sang playful, romantic numbers over a slow méringue beat called compas, the only music allowed under the Duvaliers." After the 1991 Haitian coup d'état saw the expulsion of Jean-Bertrand Aristide, "Martelly opened a Pétion-Ville club called the Garage, where he entertained many of the coup's main architects, including the much-feared chief of national police, Michel François, later convicted in absentia for massacring Aristide supporters."

== Music ==
Martelly has been heralded as a pioneer of a unique genre of compas, a style of Haitian dance music sung predominantly in the Haitian Creole language. Originally, compas was the creation of Nemours Jean-Baptiste. Martelly, a keyboardist and the self-proclaimed "President of Compas," popularized a nouvelle génération, or "new generation" style, of smaller bands with few members that relied predominantly on synthesizers and electronic instruments to reproduce a fuller sound. Martelly's live performances and recordings are sometimes laced with physical humour and humorous sociopolitical commentaries and satires. Although he is the most recognized musician and public personality in Haiti, Martelly's performance style has sometimes ignited controversy throughout Haitian communities. According to Sabine Lamour, the protection of politicians accused of rape and abuse under Martelly's presidential administration was a mirror of the culture of toxic masculinity and misogyny in street gangs, whose members embodied the "Legal Bandit" he celebrated in his 2008 album Bandi Légal.

=== Recording career ===
By 1988, Martelly's musical talent, stage craft, and his pattering style of compas had gained tremendous popularity at El Rancho Hotel and Casino and The Florville, another local venue. That year, he recorded his first single, "Ou La La", which became an instant hit, followed by "Konpas 'Foret des Pins'" in 1989, also from his debut album Ou La La. During the period of about 1988–2008, Martelly, using his stage name Sweet Micky, recorded fourteen studio albums and a number of live CDs. His music features slow méringue, compas, troubadour, carnival méringue, rabòday, etc.

In 1997, Martelly's crossover appeal to other musical genres was evident when hip hop star, Wyclef Jean of The Fugees featured him on the title track for Jean's solo effort Wyclef Jean Presents The Carnival featuring the Refugee Allstars. As Jean proclaims on 'The Carnival,' "Surprise – it's Sweet Micky, y'all!" Also in 1997, Martelly released an album containing one of his most celebrated hits, Pa Manyen ("Don't Touch"). The song is an adaptation of "Angola", composed by the renowned artist/composer/record producer Ramiro Mendes (of the Mendes Brothers), first recorded by Cesária Évora, the legendary Cape Verdean singer. Pa Manyen went on to be featured in various compilation albums, including the popular Putumayo Presents: French Caribbean in 2003. The song was also covered by Venezuelan singer, Soledad Bravo as "Canta, Canta Corazon" and by Jose Luiz Cortes of Cuba. See also the Mendes Brothers' original version of the song, performed by Ramiro Mendes, included in the group's 1997 album—Para Angola Com Um Xi Coracao. Martelly is also notorious for his cursing on stage, cross-dressing, and using homophobic slurs. His celebrity status as a popular compas musician would become a major factor in his popularity as a politician.

== Political career ==
In 1992, Martelly played for free at a protest against the arrival of a UN representative charged with negotiating the return of Jean-Bertrand Aristide after the 1991 Haitian coup d'état. Martelly later explained, "I did not want Aristide back... You want me to be a de facto [supporter of the coup]. I'm a de facto. It's my right. It's my country. I can fight for whatever I believe in." After Jean-Bertrand Aristide had been restored to office, some former military officers, paramilitaries and secret police associated with the old regime were assassinated. In February 1995, a "hit list" of such individuals was circulated, and included Martelly's name. After an individual on the list was murdered, Martelly's wife warned him not to come back from his tour, and it was almost a year before he returned to Haiti. During this time he released a song, Prezidan, "an exuberant ditty that called for a president who played compas". At the 1996 Carnival, to which Manno Charlemagne, the mayor of Port-au-Prince, invited him, Martelly dressed in a pink wig and bra. As Martelly explained, it was intended in part as a political statement:

"If you see me as a Macoute, then I'm a Macoute. If you see me as gay, I'm gay. What you think of me is no problem, as far as I am concerned. You have the right to think what you want. I know who I am, and that's the main thing."

In 1997, Martelly participated in "Knowledge Is Power", an HIV educational music video with a message about preventing the spread of HIV. His humanitarian work as the president of the Fondation Rose et Blanc, created by his wife Sophia and himself, to help the poor and disenfranchised of the country, was the basis for his choice as the Good Will Haitian Ambassador for the Protection of the Environment by the Haitian Government.

In 2004, following the 2004 Haitian coup d'état against Aristide, Gérard Latortue, a friend of Martelly's, became prime minister. At this time, Martelly was living in Florida, but in 2007, he moved back to Haiti. In the process, during the 2008 financial crisis, he defaulted on more than $1 million in loans, losing 3 properties to foreclosure.

Following the 2010 earthquake, Martelly ran for President of Haiti in the general elections. He benefited from his celebrity status as a musician and held musical rallies called koudjay (musical political endorsement rallies), drawing crowds and media attention. He also benefited from the support of Bill Clinton (UN Special Envoy to Haiti) and the active support of US Secretary of State Hillary Clinton. He challenged the results as to whether he placed second, made the runoff, or third. On 3 February 2011, it was announced that he would participate in a run-off election scheduled for 20 March 2011. On 4 April 2011, a senior official announced that Martelly had won the presidential run-off election against candidate Mirlande Manigat with more than 60% of the vote.

=== Presidency ===
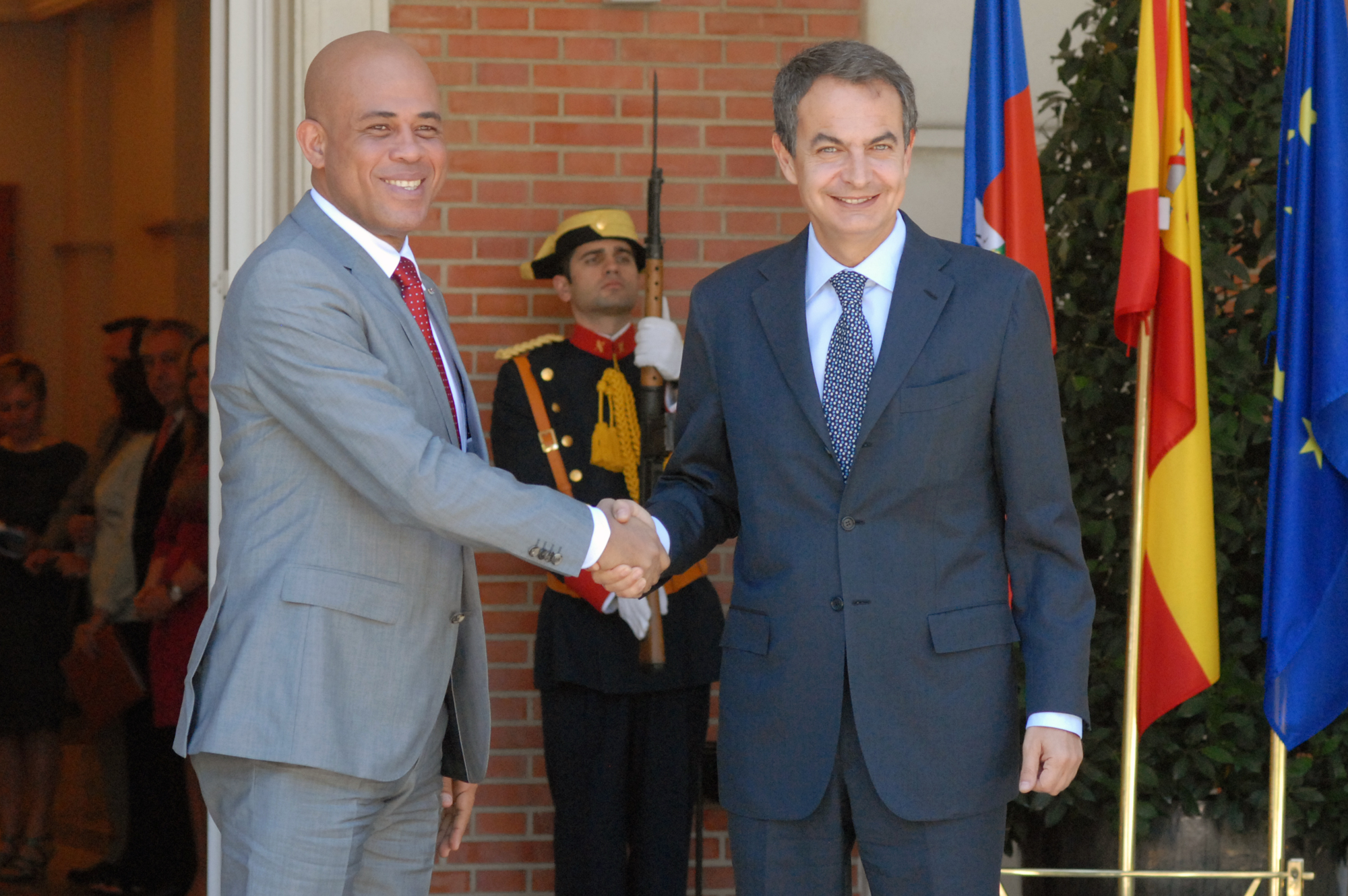
Martelly meets with Spanish Prime Minister José Luis Rodríguez Zapatero in Madrid, 7 July 2011

After the devastating earthquake, Martelly was sworn in as President of Haiti on 14 May 2011, marking the first time in Haitian history that an incumbent president peacefully transferred power to a member of the opposition. On the anniversary of the earthquake, the incumbent Haitian Prime Minister, Jean-Max Bellerive, resigned to allow Martelly to choose his own prime minister. Martelly was quick to pledge reforms for the post-earthquake reconstruction process.

In August 2011, Martelly announced a plan to reinstate the nation's military. This plan was controversial as many human rights activists were concerned about the return of a military responsible for many atrocities in the past.

In September 2011, Martelly formed an advisory board that included business executives, bankers, and politicians such as former U.S. President Bill Clinton, which he hoped would improve the economy.

In February 2012, Martelly's Prime Minister Garry Conille resigned after having been in office for five months. He was replaced in May by Laurent Lamothe, the Haitian Foreign Minister.

Between March and April 2012, Martelly was accused of corruption, with allegations that during and after the 2010 earthquake and presidential election, he had accepted $2.6 million in bribes to ensure that a Dominican Republic construction company would continue to receive contracts under his presidency. Martelly denied the allegations. Companies owned or controlled by Félix Bautista had received no-bid contracts worth $200 million, awarded by former Haitian Prime Minister Jean-Max Bellerive. In October 2013, Martelly met with a Franco-Polish arms dealer Pierre Dadak and two Canadian businessmen to discuss a $20 billion plan to develop Île-à-Vache, a plan which came to nothing, but has the source of some controversy. In November 2013, anti-government protests were held in the country over the high cost of living and corruption.

In late 2014, repeated election delays fueled months of unrest, with protesters demanding that Martelly step down. On 14 December, Laurent Lamothe resigned and was succeeded by Evans Paul, but the protests continued. The situation worsened when parliament's term ended on 13 January 2015, with large protests occurring again in Port-au-Prince. New election dates were announced in March 2015, both for parliament and for president. Martelly was ineligible to run again as Haiti's constitution does not allow for consecutive terms.

On 9 August 2015, the first election Haiti had under President Michel Martelly took place. The citizens voted in the first round to fill two-thirds of the 30-member Senate and the entire 119-member Chamber of Deputies. In the capital, groups of young men ripped up paper ballots as heavily armed police shot into the air to re-establish order. Rocks were thrown in response before authorities closed the polling station. Local media reported the closure of numerous polling places in other parts of the country and scattered arrests of people accused of voting more than once. 54 polling stations, roughly 5 per cent of the total, were closed amid violence and other disruptions. The first round of Haiti's presidential election was scheduled for 25 October 2015.

Presidential elections were held in Haiti on 25 October 2015, alongside local elections and the second round of the legislative elections. The runoff of this election were scheduled for 27 December 2015. According to preliminary results posted by the Provisional Electoral Council, Jovenel Moïse obtained 32.81% of the preferences, and Jude Célestin won 25.27%.

After the preliminary results were published on 25 October 2015, Jude Célestin said he did not recognize them. His criticism was joined by five other presidential candidates. They issued a joint statement denouncing the results as "anti-democratic" and calling for the people's vote to be respected. Martelly openly declared his support for Moïse. The supporters of Célestin protested in the streets, together with the supporters of Jean-Charles Moïse's Platfom Pitit Desalin and supporters of former President Jean-Bertrand Aristide's Fanmi Lavalas party the presidential candidate of which, Maryse Narcisse, finished fourth behind Jean-Charles Moïse and also denounced the results during a news conference. The protesters threw rocks and burned tyres. The police responded with tear gas and made some arrests. The police also stopped and searched the vehicle of a former top government prosecutor, Claudy Gassant, who is a supporter of Moïse.

Martelly resigned the presidency on 10 February 2016, leaving Haiti without a president for a week. On 17 February 2016, he was succeeded by Jocelerme Privert who served as interim president. Amid allegations of fraud in the 2015 elections, Privert created a month-long verification commission to restore legitimacy to the electoral process. In May 2016, the commission audited ~13,000 ballots and determined that the elections had been dishonest and recommended a complete redo of the election.

In 2015, Pras of the Fugees completed a documentary entitled Sweet Micky for President and directed by Ben Patterson. The film chronicles the rise of Martelly through his election to fight corruption as President of Haiti. The film had its World premiere at the 2015 Slamdance Film Festival and later appeared on Showtime.

== Canadian government sanctions against Martelly ==
On 17 November 2022, the Government of Canada imposed joint sanctions against Martelly and former Prime Ministers Laurent Lamothe and Jean Henry Ceant. The sanctions were taken against Martelly on the basis of "gross and systematic human rights violations in Haiti." Specifically, Martelly is accused of supporting violent armed gangs in Haiti that terrorize the population. A "tormented" Martelly was seen returning to Haiti from Miami 24 hours before the sanctions were publicly announced, traveling with nine pieces of luggage.

A press release by the office of Canadian Prime Minister Justin Trudeau said that Martelly is "suspected of protecting and enabling the illegal activities of armed criminal gangs.

== U.S. Sanctions ==
In August 2024, the U.S. Treasury Department imposed sanctions on Martelly for allegedly using his influence to create "an environment allowing drug trafficking activities" and turning Haiti into "a transit point for illicit drugs entering the United States". The sanctions also include a ban on his travelling to the United States.

== Personal life and later music career ==
Martelly divorced his first wife, an American citizen, in 1986.

Martelly has a brother, Girard, who served in the United States Armed Forces.

Martelly used to live in Haiti and held several homes in Palm Beach, Florida. He lived with his wife and former manager, Sophia Saint–Rémy, and their four children, Olivier, Sandro, Yani, and Malaika. In 2006, Martelly announced his unofficial retirement from recording and performing, but two years later announced a return to music with a new single, Magouyè, and the video/short film, "Bandi Legal yo ki rive". He is a cousin of Port-au-Prince hotel manager and musician Richard Morse. As of 2024, Martelly lived in Miami, Florida.

In April 2012, Martelly was flown to the United States for treatment of what was later diagnosed as a pulmonary embolism. It was attributed to the immobilisation of his arm necessitated by recent shoulder surgery.

== Honours ==
- Panama:
  - Collar of the Order of Manuel Amador Guerrero (February 18, 2014)
- Taiwan:
  - Grand Cordon of the Order of Brilliant Jade (April 22, 2014)

== Discography ==
Title	Released	Type	Label	as...
Woule Woule	1989	Studio	Geronimo	Michel Martelly
Anba Rad La	1990	Studio	AP	Michel Martelly
The Sweetest	1992	Studio	Josy	Michel Martelly
Min Koze-A	1993	Studio	Josy	Michel Martelly
I Don't Care	1994	Studio	Josy	Michel Martelly
Pa Manyen	1995	Studio	Josy	Michel Martelly
Tout Cé Mately	1996	Studio	Déclic	Michel Martelly
Aloufa	1997	Studio	Antilles	Michel Martelly
Best of Sweet Micky	1997	Compilation	Déclic	Sweet Micky
100.000 Volts	1998	Studio	Mini Records	Michel Martelly
An Bolewo	1998	Live	Anson	Sweet Micky
Dènye Okazyon	1999	Studio	Geronimo	Michel Martelly
Jojo Ban'm Nouvel Micky	1999	Live	Exit	Michel Martelly
100% KaKa	1999	Live	Mad Dog	Sweet Micky
Michel Martelly Live	2000	Live	Créon	Sweet Micky
SiSiSi	2001	Studio	Créon	Michel Martelly
Live au café des arts: Vol. 2	2001	Live	Geronimo	Sweet Micky
200% KaKa	2001	Studio/Live	Mad Dog	Sweet Micky
Rale Kow La	????	Live	Geronimo	Sweet Micky
400% KaKa	2002	Live	Mad Dog	Sweet Micky
Live at Best Western	2002	Live	Geronimo	Sweet Micky
Best of Michel Martelly	2002	Compilation	Créon	Michel Martelly
Totot	2003	Studio	AD	Sweet Micky
Micky Chez Lui (Micky Bolero 2)	2003		Exit	Sweet Micky
Sweet Micky Live	2003	Live	Geronimo	Sweet Micky
New Repertoire	2004	Live	Exit	Sweet Micky
Babaille Micky Mix	2004		Exit	Sweet Micky
GNB	2005	Studio	D-Facto	Sweet Micky
Sweet Micky with Robert Martino: Live Vol. 1	2005	Live	Touche Douce	Sweet Micky
Sweet Micky with Robert Martino: Live Vol. 1	2005	Live	Touche Douce	Sweet Micky
Micky ap Trip	2005	Live	Exit	Sweet Micky
Sweet Micky & Djakout: Live 2006	2006	Live	Feeling	Sweet Micky
Jojo Ban'm Nouvel Micky	2006	Live	Exit	Michel Martelly
Sweet Micky vs Dega	2007	Live	Arnold	Sweet Micky
Live in Miami (Ouvè Kôw)	2007	Live	Acoustique	Sweet Micky
Blazin' Live	2007	Live	Exit	Sweet Micky
Bandi Légal	2008	Studio	Antilles	Sweet Micky
Micky & Sons	2008		Antilles	Sweet Micky
Vin' Pran Konpa	2008	Studio	Patrick	Sweet Micky
Konpa Prezidantiyèl	2010	Live	Sweet Micky	Sweet Micky
Prézidan Éspwa Vote #8	2011	Studio	ArnoldZic	Sweet Micky

Political offices
Preceded by René Préval	President of Haiti; 2011–2016	Succeeded by Jocelerme Privert; Provisional
