= List of natural disasters in Haiti =

Haiti's unique position and geography in the Caribbean makes it especially vulnerable to many kinds of natural disasters. The most notable of these disasters are landfalls from tropical cyclones, major earthquakes (due to its position over an active fault line), and general flooding events (often accompanied with landslides that kill hundreds).

Confirmable records of these disasters go back to at least the 15th century, and it is all but certain that many more were unrecorded or otherwise lost affecting the indigenous tribes of Haiti even before then.

The following is a non-exhaustive list of natural disasters which have struck Haiti.

== Disasters ==
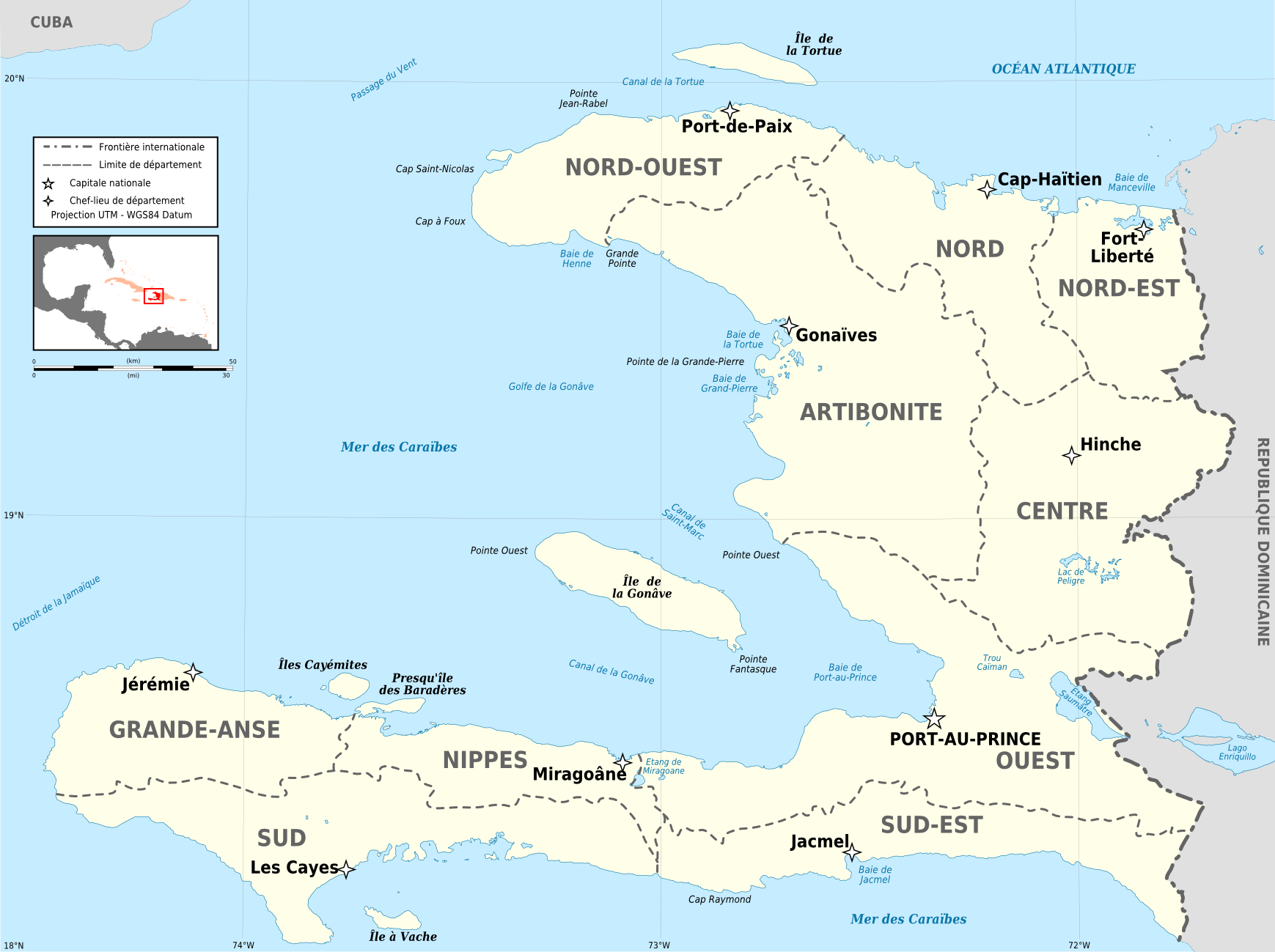
Districts of Haiti

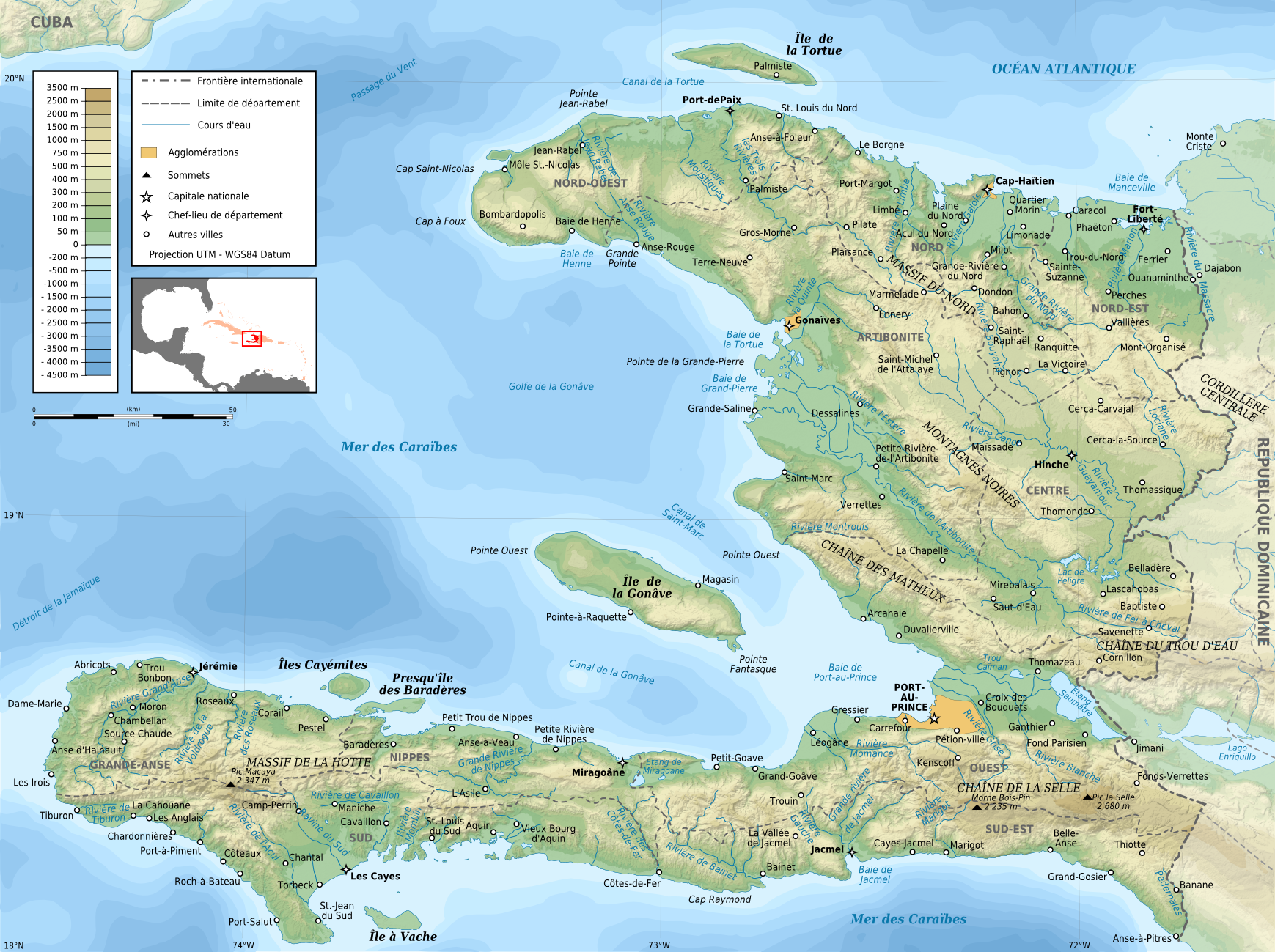
Map of Haiti

1691
- Earthquake
1751

- 3 June: Earthquake at Port-au-Prince and areas to the south. The city and towns were destroyed.

1816

- 18–19 November: a cyclone caused considerable damage in the countryside of Ouest department and in the Gulf of Gonâve.

1842

- 7 May: Earthquake at Cap-Haïtien and throughout the north. The town of Cap-Haïtien was destroyed along with the towns of Port-de-Paix, Gonaïves, and Fort-Liberté, and many towns in the Dominican Republic were affected.

1887

- 23 September: Earthquake in the western region of Haiti.

1904

- Earthquake in the north of the country. Port-de-Paix and Cap-Haïtien were severely affected.

1909

- 12 November: cyclone in Ouest département. Around 150 victims were counted in plaine du Cul de Sac alone.

1915

- 12 August: cyclone on the southern peninsula, which devastated Jacmel and Jérémie.

1935

- 21 October: hurricane in Sud and Sud-Est départements. 2,000 people perished.

1946

- Earthquake in the northeast Dominican Republic accompanied by a tsunami in the region of Nagua. Haiti was also affected.

1952

- 27 October: earthquake at Anse-à-Veau in Grand'Anse killed 6 and rendered thousands homeless.

1954

- 11–12 October: Hurricane Hazel affected every part of Haiti. At more than 249 km/h, the hurricane devastated the country, killing several thousand people.

1963

- 3 October: Hurricane Flora struck the Sud and Ouest départements, causing over 5,000 deaths.
- 14 November: flooding of the Grande Rivière du Nord killed almost 500 people.

1964

- 24 August: Hurricane Cleo hit the south coast, especially the Cayes-Jacmel region, causing 192 deaths.

1966

- 29 September: Hurricane Inez devastated, at more than 170 km/h, the Sud and Ouest départements
- Earthquake

1976

- 20 May: Floods in the Cayes-Jacmel region. 20 people lost presumed dead, considerable property damage.

1980

- 5 August: Hurricane Allen, at more than 270 km/h, struck the south coast, especially the Cayes-Jacmel region, causing approximately 200 deaths.
- Atlantic hurricane season

1984

- 10 June: floods at Port-de-Paix.

1986

- 1 June: Floods in the Cayes-Jacmel region. 20,000 hectares of land were flooded and several thousand homes damaged.
- 23 October: flooding at Ile de la Gonâve. 31 killed, 906 homeless, more than 380 houses destroyed or damaged.

1987

- 27 April: flooding at Port-de-Paix.
- 8 May: flooding at Thiotte in Sud-Est département and in the Delmas and Caradeux neighbourhoods of Port-au-Prince.

1988

- 27 January: flooding in the Nord-Ouest département.
- 20 June: flooding in L'Estère in the Artibonite département.
- 11 September: Hurricane Gilbert devastated the south coast, particularly the Anse-à-Veau, Camp-Perrin, Cavaillon, Cayes, Île à Vache, Jacmel, Jérémie, Kenscoff and Port-Salut regions.
- 8 October: flooding in the Plaine de Léogâne.

1989

- 23 February: flooding in Île de la Gonâve. 4,945 families affected, 1,527 houses destroyed and 1640 damaged.

1994

- 12 and 13 November: Hurricane Gordon crossed Sud-Est département and the southern peninsula, causing flooding and approximately 2,000 deaths and disappearances.

1998

- 23 September: Hurricane Georges devastated the Sud-Est and Nord-Ouest départements, causing 147 deaths, 34 serious injuries, 40 disappearances, and 167,500 displaced.

2002

- 24–27 May: Flooding on the southern peninsula. The town of Camp Perrin and the settlements of L'Asile and Anse-à-Veau were worst affected by the tropical storms. 31 dead, 14 disappeared and more than 7,000 displaced in the dans le Sud département.

2004

- 23–24 May: Torrential rains which pounded the south-east of Haiti during the night caused 1,232 deaths, 1,443 disappearances and 31,130 displaced persons.Mapou Belle-Anse with 432 dead, Bodary with 350 dead and Fonds-Verrettes with 237 victims, all located in Sud-Est département, were the places most badly hit.
  The gravity of this situation led the interim government of Boniface and Latortue to declare Friday 28 May a day of national mourning.
- 10 September: Hurricane Ivan struck the southern peninsula and west coast, causing serious damage in several areas due to flooding.
- 18–19 September: Hurricane Jeanne crossed the western section of Haiti and the Artibonite, causing flooding which killed 1,870. In addition: 2,620 injured, 846 disappeared and 300,000 displaced. With more than 3,000 dead, Gonaïves was the most seriously affected city.

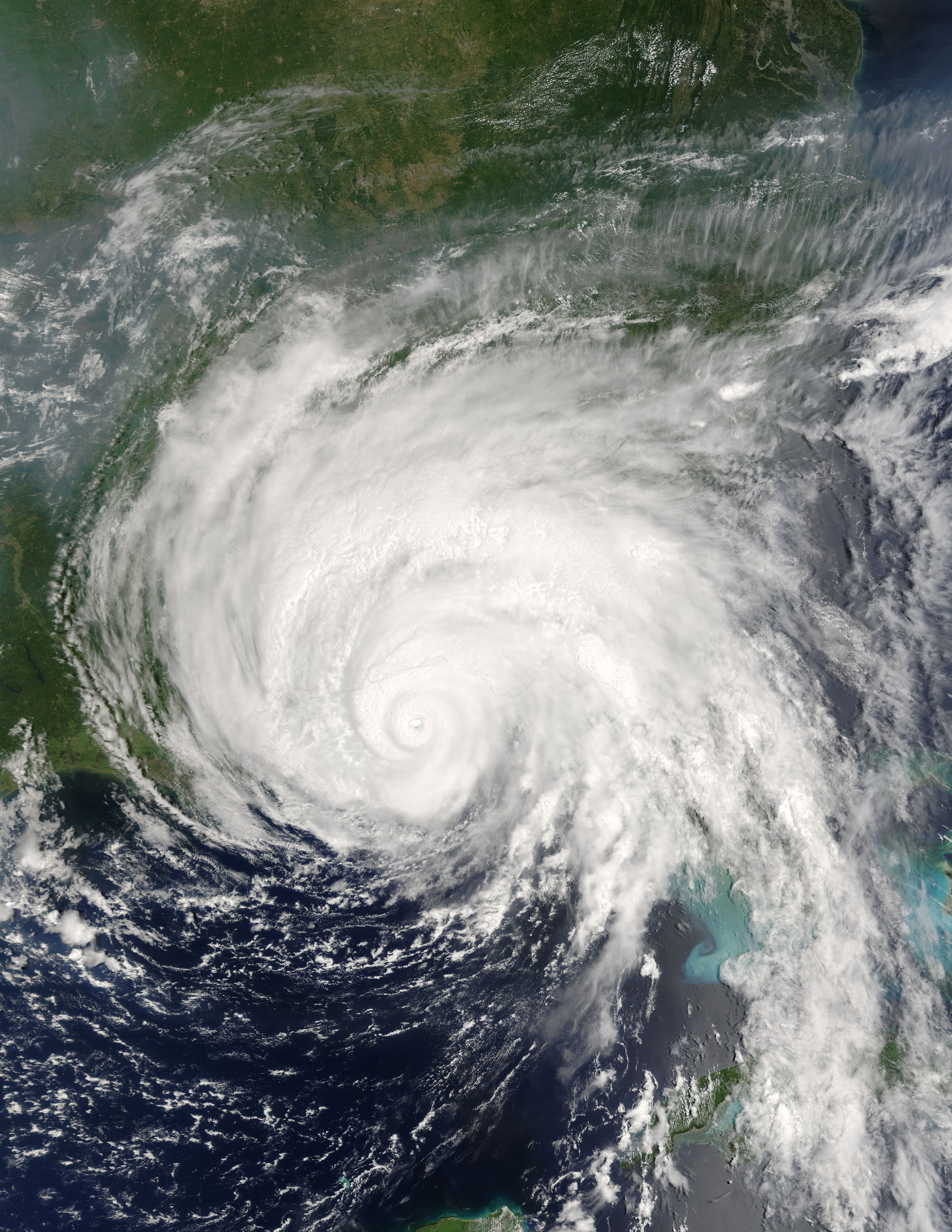
Hurricane Dennis, 10 July 2005 at 16:15 UTC.

2005

- 6 and 7 July: Hurricane Dennis touched the south-east coast of Haiti, causing flooding in several towns in Sud (Bainet, Grand-Goâve, Les Cayes...) and leaving more than 500 homeless.
- 4 October: Floods in several parts of the country, including Pétion-Ville and Grand-Goâve in Ouest département, where the high water caused considerable loss of property. The government did not make a final accounting of this catastrophe.
- 17–18 October: Hurricane Wilma struck the west and south of Haiti.
- 23 October: Tropical Storm Alpha crossed the south peninsula, affecting the départements of Grand'Anse and Nippes.
- 25 October: Flooding caused by torrential rain hit many parts of the Nord-Ouest département, particularly the settlements of Port-de-Paix, Bassin-Bleu, Anse-à-Foleur and Saint-Louis du Nord.

2006

- 22 and 23 November: heavy rain caused flooding in Grand'Anse, Nippes and Nord-Ouest départements, causing damage to roadways including the collapse of a bridge across Ravine Sable at Trou-Bonbon.

2007

- 17 March: floods caused by rain and storms hit a large part of Haiti for over a week. Six départements were particularly affected:
  - Grand'Anse: Jérémie, Abricots, Bonbon, Les Irois
  - Sud-Est : Jacmel
  - Ouest : Cité Soleil, Delmas, Port-au-Prince (Carrefour-Feuilles, Canapé Vert)
  - Nord-Ouest : Port-de-Paix, Saint-Louis du Nord, Anse-à-Foleur
  - Nord: Cap-Haïtien
  - Nord-Est : Ferrier, Ouanaminthe.
- 8–9 May: torrential rain, causing considerable damage in several regions of the country, in particular in the Nord, Nord-Est and Sud départements. The town of Ouanaminthe was particularly hard hit and the bridge between Ouanaminthe and Dajabón which links Haiti to the Dominican Republic was severely damaged.

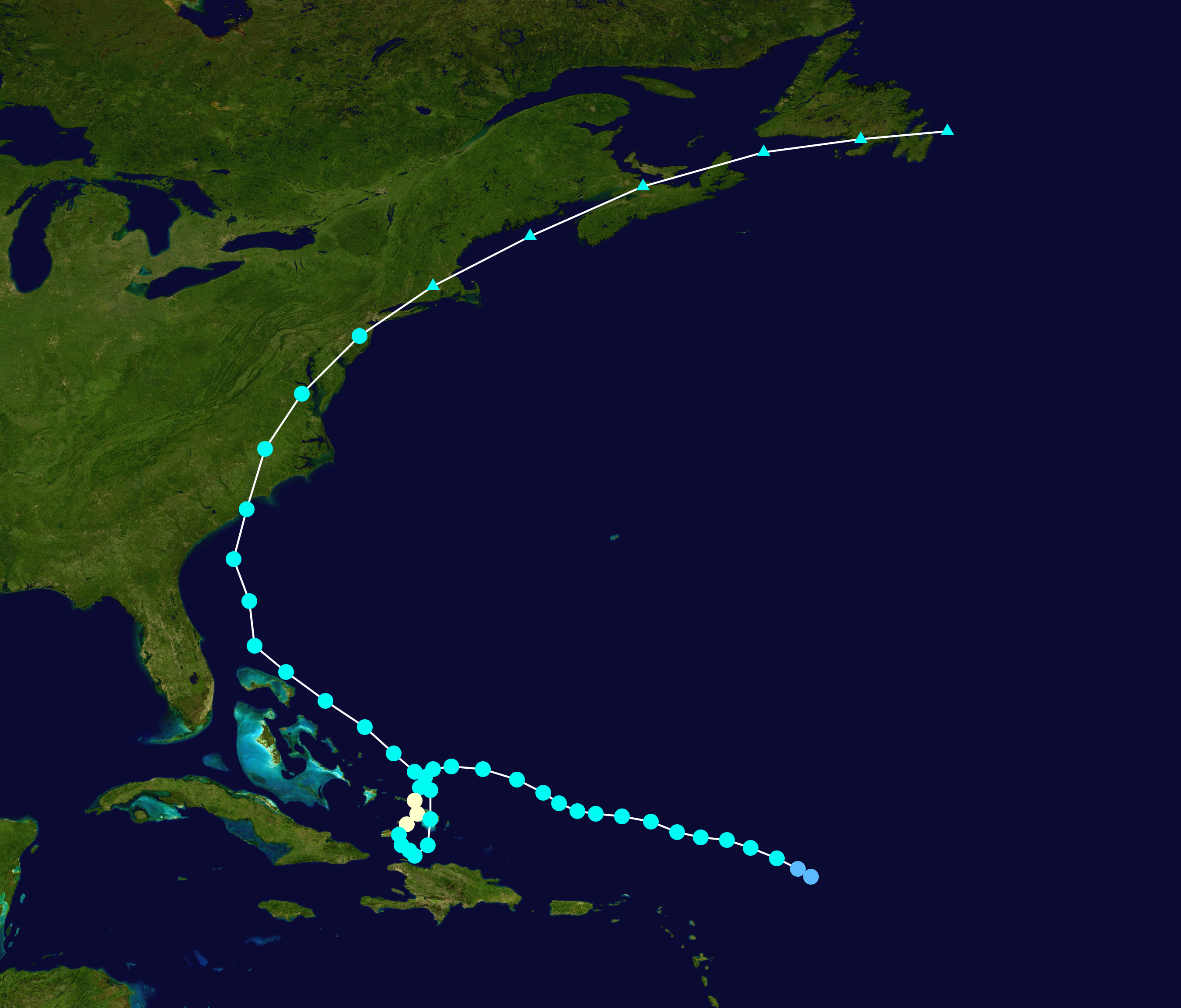
Trajectory of Hurricane Hanna in 2008, prior to its extra-tropical transition

2008

- 16 August: Tropical Storm Fay crossed the entire country.
- 26 August: Hurricane Gustav crosses the south peninsula, including the Sud and Grand'Anse départements, causing approximately 77 deaths and 8 disappearances, together with serious destruction of property. 15,000 families were affected by the storm, which destroyed 3,000 houses and damaged 11,458.
- 1 September: Hurricane Hanna ravaged the Artibonite and Nord-Est départements. Several towns were flooded, including Gonaïves. One death was officially confirmed. In addition to Gonaïves, several towns in Jacmel, Nord-Est, Sud and Sud-Est were flooded..
- 6 September: Hurricane Ike, a category 4 hurricane, grazed the western coastline of Haiti, leading to heavy rain in Nord, Ouest and Nord-Ouest départements.

2009

- 20 October: heavy rain in the Haitian capital and its suburbs. Carrefour, in the southern suburbs, was completely flooded.

2010

- 12 January: the magnitude 7.0 2010 Haiti earthquake which occurred on 12 at 16:53, local time. The earthquake killed between 100,000 and 316,000 people. Its epicentre was at approximately 25 km from Port-au-Prince, the capital. A dozen secondary shocks of magnitudes ranging from 5.0 to 5.9 were registered during the hours which followed. It was one of the deadliest earthquakes ever recorded.
- 20 January: A second earthquake of magnitude 6.1 occurred on 20 January 2010 at 06:03 local time. Its epicentre was at approximately 59 km west of Port-au-Prince, and at least 10 km beneath the surface.
- 20 October: A Cholera epidemic hit outside of Port-au-Prince, killing at least 3,597 and sickening over 340,000.
- 5 November: Hurricane Tomas hits and kills at least 10 Haitians causing damage and worsening the cholera epidemic.

2012

- 24 October: Hurricane Sandy passes just west of Haiti, delivering heavy rainfall and leaving some areas with catastrophic flooding. At least 108 people were killed and 21 were left missing. Around 200,000 people were left homeless as of October 29.

2016

- 3–4 October: Hurricane Matthew hits Haiti with catastrophic flooding of up to 40 inches and storm surge of up to 10 feet. At least 580 people were killed and more than 35,000 left homeless by the storm.

2018

- 6 October: A 5.9 magnitude earthquake with a depth of 11.7km occurred at 20:11 local time killing 12 people and injuring 188. Damage was mainly recorded in the far north of the island as stated by the Prime Minister Jean-Henry Céant.

2020

- 23 August: Hurricane Laura struck Haiti as a tropical storm and it killed 31 people in Haiti and four in the Dominican Republic.

2021

- 4 July: Hurricane Elsa passed near the Tiburon Peninsula, Haiti although damage was reported to banana and corn crops, as well as damage to the roofs of some buildings; no other forms of significant damage to infrastructure were reported.
- 14 August: A magnitude 7.2 earthquake struck Southwestern Haiti. Its epicenter was about 10 km from Petit-Trou-de-Nippes, approximately 150 km (93 miles) west of Port-au-Prince, the capital. The quake left behind significant damage. Tsunami warnings were immediately issued as several small tsunami waves struck surrounding areas. An estimated 2,207 people have been confirmed dead, while 344 remain missing, and over 12,000 left injured. It is the strongest earthquake to strike Haiti since 1842.
- 17 August: Hurricane Grace brought heavy rainfall to Haiti, reaching around 10 in (250 mm); this caused flooding in areas affected by a magnitude-7.2 earthquake in the country that previously killed thousands. Strong winds destroyed homes previously damaged by the earthquake.

2022

- 2022 Haiti floods

2023

- 2023 Haiti floods
