= Petite Rivière de Jacmel =

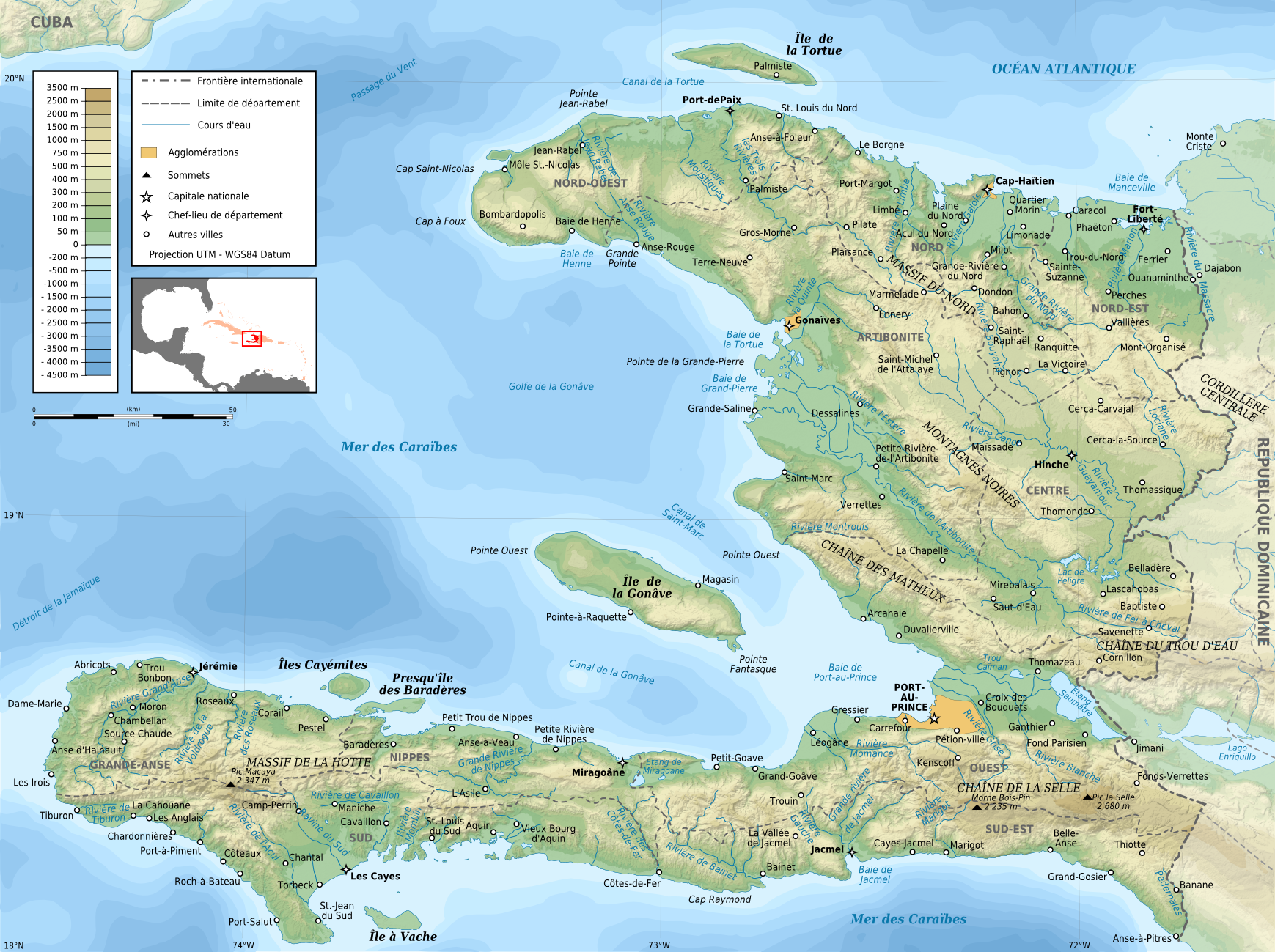
- Location in Haiti

Location
- Country: Haiti
- City: Jacmel

Physical characteristics
- Source
  - location: Chaîne de la Selle
  - coordinates: 18°14′02″N 72°37′01″W
- Mouth
  - location: Caribbean Sea Jacmel
  - coordinates: 18°13′48″N 72°33′04″W
  - elevation: 0 m (0 ft)
- Length: 10 km (6.2 mi)

Basin features
- Waterbodies: Bassin Bleu
- Sources: Google Maps

The Petite Rivière de Jacmel (French pronunciation: [pətit ʁivjɛʁ də ʒakmɛl]) is a watercourse running in Haiti through the Sud-Est department and the arrondissement of Jacmel.

== Geography ==
The Petite Rivière de Jacmel takes its source in the foothills of the mountain range called Chaîne de la Selle, and set in Hispaniola's Tiburon Peninsula. Over approximately 10 kilometers long, the river then runs Eastwards, to meet South with the Caribbean Sea at the level of its mouth in the bay of the port-city of Jacmel.

Along its path in the mountain, the river turns into small cascades opening on several small stream pools, called all together Bassin Bleu (literally "Blue Basin" in French).
Made up of three deep, crystal blue pools of cool water hidden into the woods, Bassin Bleu is a stunning site of great touristic interest for visitors to the Jacmel area.

== Toponymy ==
The Petite Rivière de Jacmel got its name opposite to the Grande Rivière de Jacmel (literally "Great River of Jacmel" in French), better known locally as Rivière de la Cosse, which runs North-East to the commune of Jacmel, but shares the same river mouth in the Caribbean Sea.

== See also ==
- List of rivers of Haiti
- Bassin Bleu
- Geography of Haiti
