= Cascade Pichon =

Series of waterfalls located in Haiti

Coordinates: 20.948°S 55.638°E

Cascade Pichon (Haitian Creole: Kaskad Pichon) is a series of waterfalls located in the Belle-Anse Arrondissement, in the Sud-Est department of Haiti. The waterfalls are fed by an underground lake. The former Haitian dictator Jean-Claude Duvalier named Cascade Pichon one of Haiti's greatest tourist destinations.

== Access ==
Cascade Pichon is remote and access is difficult. The gravel road passes through riverbeds, flood plains and steep inclines. It is located approximately one hour drive north of the village of Pichon, near Belle-Anse commune, a thirty minute hike from car parking.

== Pools ==
The waterfall consists of three pools:

- Bassin Dieula
- Bassin Marassa
- Bassin Chouket
