= Ciné Institute =

Haitian school

- Type: Public
- Established: 2008
- Director: Paula Hyppolite
- Location: Route de Meyer, Jacmel, Sud-Est, Haiti
- Website: cineinstitute.com

Ciné Institute is a film school in Jacmel, Haiti, which grew out of the Jacmel Film Festival in 2008. It is the first and only film school in Haiti founded by David Belle. The college offers a free two-year tuition made possible by private donors. The school encourages professionals, filmmakers, business people and artists from other mediums to come visit and perform workshops (called "master classes") within its weekly schedule; time slots that are pre-reserved in its curriculum. Some notable attendees include, Paul Haggis, Jonathan Demme, Ben Stiller, Susan Sarandon and Edwidge Danticat.

== Curriculum ==
There are three principle divisions:

- Ciné Lekol, a two-year training curriculum, with first year students begin to learn about all aspects of filmmaking. While in the second year, students choose a specialty skill to focus on.
- Ciné Services, a post-graduate and employment division.
- Ciné Support, provides graduates with the technical support needed to produce their own projects.

== Requirements ==
To be eligible to apply to Ciné Institute, a completion in high school is required. The typical age range is between 18 and 35, with a few students who have been over 35. It is open to all students around the country, but board is not available. Interested students would have to move to Jacmel or commute nearby.
