= Bassin Bleu (Jacmel) =

Natural water site in Haiti

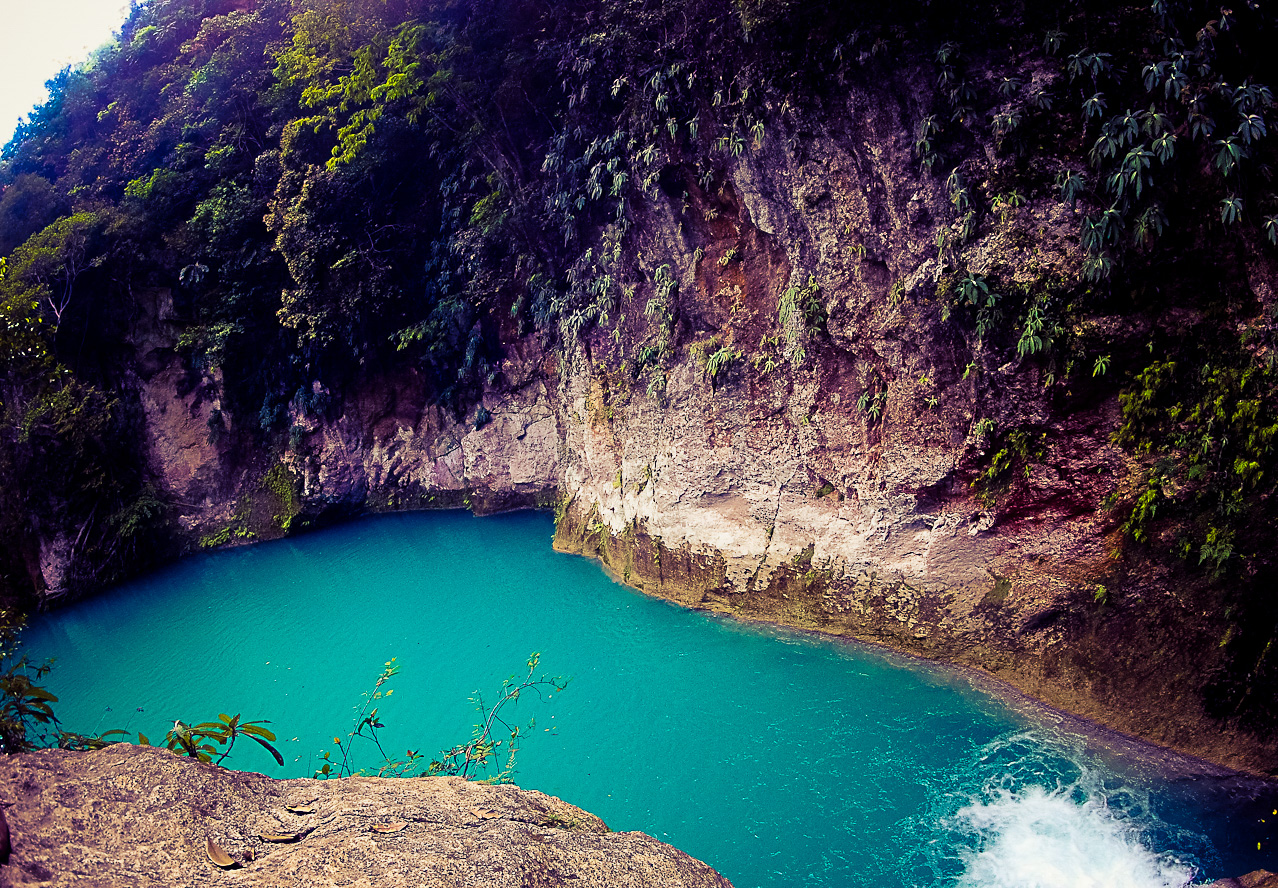
- One of the pools of Bassin Bleu, May 2013

- Location within Haiti
- Location: Haiti
- Coordinates: 18.2342°N 72.5881°W

Bassin Bleu (Haitian Creole: Basenblé; Blue Basin) is located 12 kilometres (7.5 mi) northwest of the city of Jacmel, in the Sud-Est department of Haiti. It is a series of three pools along the Petite Rivière de Jacmel.

It has historically popular site for international tourists to visit, but visitation has suffered with fear of local unrest from 2018.

== Access ==
To access the site, you need to go in the direction of La Vallée-de-Jacmel, and then Bassin-Bleu. From the village of Bassin-Bleu, the road to the site is up.

Access is not very difficult with a four-wheel drive vehicle. It is a winding road in the mountains allowing access to the site. Getting into the best open part and for diving from several levels requires about a 20-minute hike, then roping down a 12 feet (3.7 m) rock face. Locals are often present for guidance and steadying. As of 2018, each visitor pays an admission fee of 100HTG at the tourism office, then one can walk there independently or hire a local guide for a fee (about 100HTG per person). Additionally there is a 100HTG parking fee per car.

There are rock faces that visitors are able to jump from into the pools.

== Pools ==
The site consists of four pools:

- Bassin Palmiste
- Bassin Bleu
- Bassin Clair
- Bassin Cheval

The latter is by far the most well known with a cascade of 10 metres (32.8 ft) falling into a pool of turquoise water. The mineral-rich waters can turn muddy brown after heavy rainfall.

== Geology ==
The surrounding rock is a limestone formation, and the waterfall is a year-round karst spring.
