= 2023 Haiti floods =

Flooding in Haiti caused by heavy rains

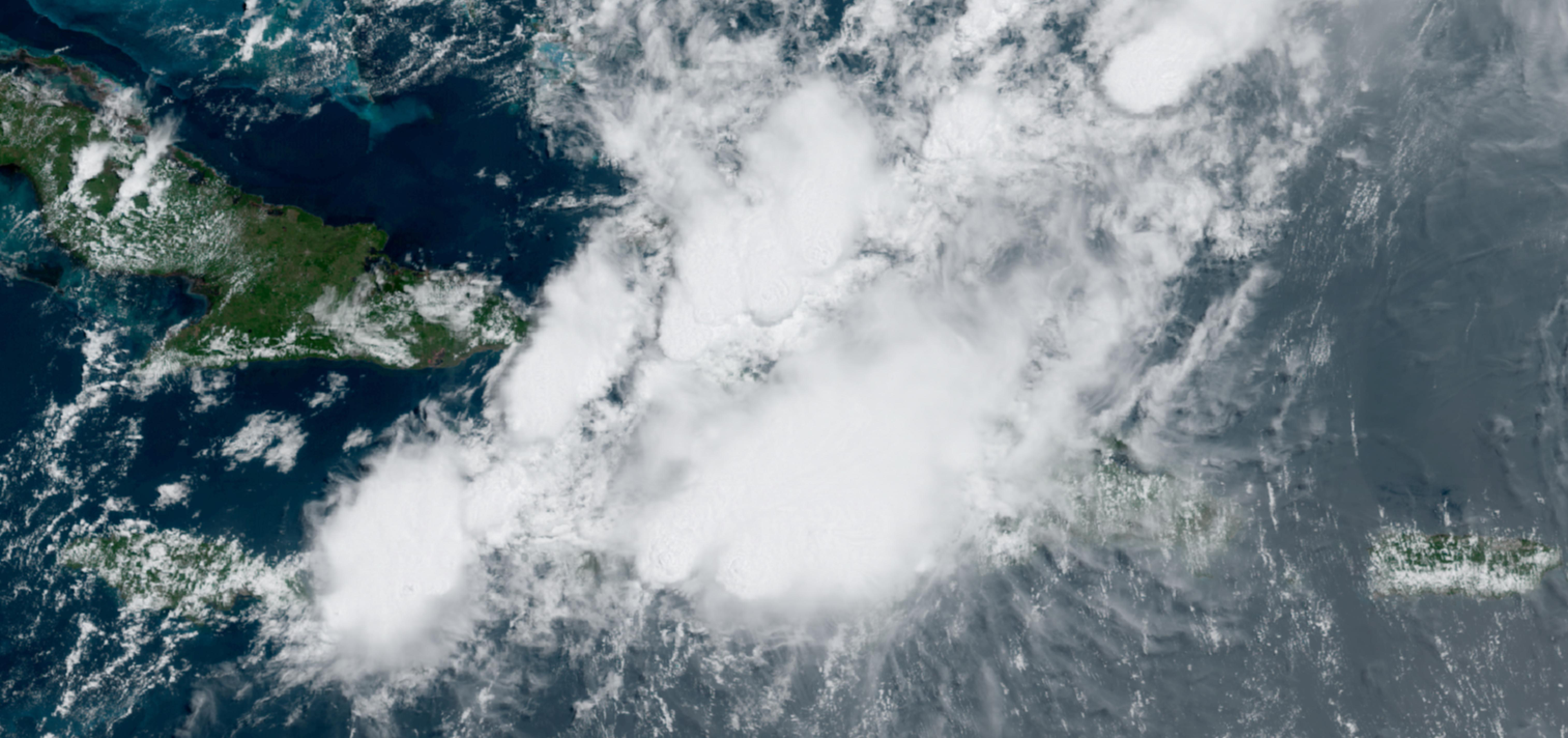
- Satellite imagery of the storm system responsible for the floods on 3 June
- Cause: Heavy rains

Meteorological history
- Duration: 2–3 June 2023

Flood

Overall effects
- Fatalities: 51
- Injuries: 140
- Missing: 18
- Areas affected: Ouest, Nippes, Sud-Est, Nord-Ouest, and Centre departments, Haiti
- Houses destroyed: ≥160

On 2–3 June 2023, heavy rains caused destructive flooding across Haiti. Western areas of the country were particularly hard-hit. At least 51 people were killed, 140 were injured, and 11 were reported missing as of 6 June.

== Background ==
From late May to early June 2023, periods of heavy rain impacted Haiti, leaving soils saturated and unable to absorb much additional rain. On 2–3 June, a stationary area of low pressure produced heavy rain and thunderstorms across the country. Rains subsided the following day as the storm system waned. With the aforementioned soils saturated, widespread flooding and landslides ensued.

== Impact and aftermath ==
Rivers overflowed their banks, inundating many communities. Landslides were also reported. Five of Haiti's ten departments were affected: Ouest, Nippes, Sud-Est, Nord-Ouest, and Centre. Damage was particularly severe around the capital city of Port-au-Prince. As of 6 June, 51 people were confirmed dead, 140 were injured, and 18 remained missing. One person drowned and 14 others were rescued when their boat capsized off the coast of Côtes-de-Fer. Crops were severely affected in central regions of the country. Three rivers burst their banks around Jérémie, leaving the city partially isolated. A bridge recently constructed in the city following a catastrophic earthquake in 2021 was partially destroyed. A total of 37,375 people were affected, 13,390 of whom were displaced. At least 13,591 homes were flooded and 820 were destroyed. Five health centers were also affected

Prime Minister Ariel Henry requested international aid following the disaster. The World Food Programme began mobilizing resources and personnel on 5 June, with rations and dry food for 15,000 planned for distribution. The Directorate-General for Civil Protection and Emergencies and United Nations Office for the Coordination of Humanitarian Affairs worked in tandem for relief efforts. Relief missions costing US$720 million already in place from the 2021 earthquake were only 20 percent funded at the time of the floods. Recurrent gang violence hampered relief efforts. Léogâne Mayor Ernson Henry described residents as "desperate...[after losing] everything".

Two earthquakes followed the floods: a M_{w}4.1 on 4 June and a M_{w} 4.9 on 6 June. The latter of these occurred near Jérémie, further complicating relief efforts. Four people were killed and 36 others were injured.

== See also ==
- List of natural disasters in Haiti
- 2022 Haiti floods
