= Félix Morisseau-Leroy =

Haitian writer (1912–1998)

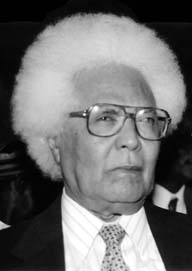
- Born: March 13, 1912; Grand-Gosier, Haiti
- Died: September 5, 1998 (aged 86)
- Occupations: Writer, poet

Félix Morisseau-Leroy (French pronunciation: [feliks mɔʁiso ləʁwa]; 13 March 1912 – 5 September 1998) was a Haitian writer who used Haitian Creole to write poetry and plays, the first significant writer to do so. By 1961 he succeeded in having Creole recognized as an official language of Haiti, after expanding its teaching in schools and use in creative literature. Morisseau also published works on French, Haitian Creole and Haitian French literature. He worked internationally, encouraging the development of national literature in post-colonial Ghana and Senegal. In 1981 he settled in Miami, Florida, where he was influential in uniting the Haitian community around Creole and encouraged its study in academia.

== Early life and education ==
Born in Grand Gosier, Haiti, in 1912 to an educated, well-to-do mulatto family, Morisseau-Leroy studied in nearby Jacmel, where he was educated in French and English. There he met his future wife Renée, who admired his skills as a horseman.

== Marriage and family ==
Morisseau-Leroy married Renée in Jacmel, and always said she inspired his poetry. They had two sons and a daughter.

== Career ==
After returning from the US to Haiti, he taught in the capital Port-au-Prince. He began to pay more attention to the Creole of the streets and to think of its power as a written language to unite the country. At that time, French was used by the educated classes, and Creole was the language of the common people.

Morisseau-Leroy taught literature and theater, and also worked as a writer and journalist. He was appointed to political offices in government, including director in the Haitian Ministry of Public Instruction and General Director of National Education.

Known informally as "Moriso", he was a father of the Creole Renaissance. He promoted the movement to stimulate use of Haitian Creole (or Kreyòl) language and establish its legitimacy for creative use in literature and culture. As this was the only language of the majority of the people, who were mostly rural, Morisseau believed strongly in using Creole as a means of uniting the country. Morisseau used the spirit of Vodou and the Haitian Creole language to adapt the classical Greek tragedy Antigone for theater. One of the main characters of Antigòn became the central character of another play, Wa Kreyon.

The rise of Papa Doc Duvalier's autocratic regime shut down many of the most promising writers, as he was threatened by free expression. According to one story, Duvalier sent armed forces to escort Morisseau to the airport and force him into exile because he was offended by his work. Only the fact that they were former classmates and friends probably saved Morisseau's life.

Morisseau-Leroy was invited to France to produce Wa Kreyon in Paris. While there he met major figures in the Négritude movement, such as Aimé Césaire and Leopold Senghor. They encouraged his work and also influenced his future teaching in nations of Africa and in the United States.

He next moved to Ghana, where he taught and headed the national theatre as colonialism was ending. He taught in Ghana for seven years, then moved to Senegal, where he taught until 1979. Other Haitian writers exiled by Duvalier to Senegal included Jean Brierre, Gérard Chenet and Roger Dorsinville.

Morisseau-Leroy last moved in 1981 to Miami, Florida, where there was a large Haitian community. He settled with his family there for the rest of his life. In teaching Haitian Creole and literature, he helped unite immigrants and their descendants around their heritage. He wrote a weekly column carried in the periodical Haïti en Marche. In later years, his mop of a white-haired Afro became a trademark, as was his sense of humor.

In 1991, his work was included in a collection of English translations (by Jeffrey Knapp, Marie Marcelle Buteau Racine, Marie Helene Laraque, and Suze Baron), Haitiad and Oddities, published in Miami. It contains "Natif Natal," originally written in French, and 12 poems, including "Boat People," "Thank You Dessalines," and "Water," originally written in Haitian Creole. In 1995 he published his last work, an epic novel of Haiti of which he was proud, entitled Les Djons d'Haiti Tom (People of Haiti with Courage).

He died in Miami in 1998.

== Influence ==
- Dyakout I (Diacoute) (1953) collection of poetry, and other works in Creole have been published in translation in six languages.
- In addition, Morisseau published critical work on Creole, Haitian French, and French national literature.
- Through his teaching and leadership, Morisseau helped create national literature and theater of Ghana and Senegal.
- His teaching in Miami, Florida, encouraged immigrants, descendants and others to study and write in Haitian Creole, as well as leading to the academic study of Creole in the US.

== Honors and legacy ==
- Authors have dedicated plays and volumes of poetry to Morisseau-Leroy.
- A street in Miami, Florida's Little Haiti neighborhood was named after him.
- In 1991 Morisseau-Leroy was invited by Jean-Bertrand Aristide to Haiti to be a guest speaker at his inauguration. There Aristide affirmed Creole as an official language.
- The Canadian journal Étincelles named Morisseau as Writer of the Year.
- The 13 March 1992 issue of Finesse magazine (published in New York) was a collective tribute to Morisseau's 80th birthday.
- In 1994 the French journal Sapriphage devoted a special edition to his work called Haiti's Presence.

== Selected works ==
- Plénitudes (1940), poetry
- Natif-natal, conte en vers (1948), short story in verse
- Dyakout (Diacoute) (1951), poetry
- Wa Kreyon (Antigone) in Kreyòl (1953), play adapted for Haiti
- Haitiad and Oddities (1991), poetry
- Les Djons d'Haiti Tom (People of Haiti with Courage) (1995)
