= Belle-Anse =

Belle-Anse Bèlans
- Commune
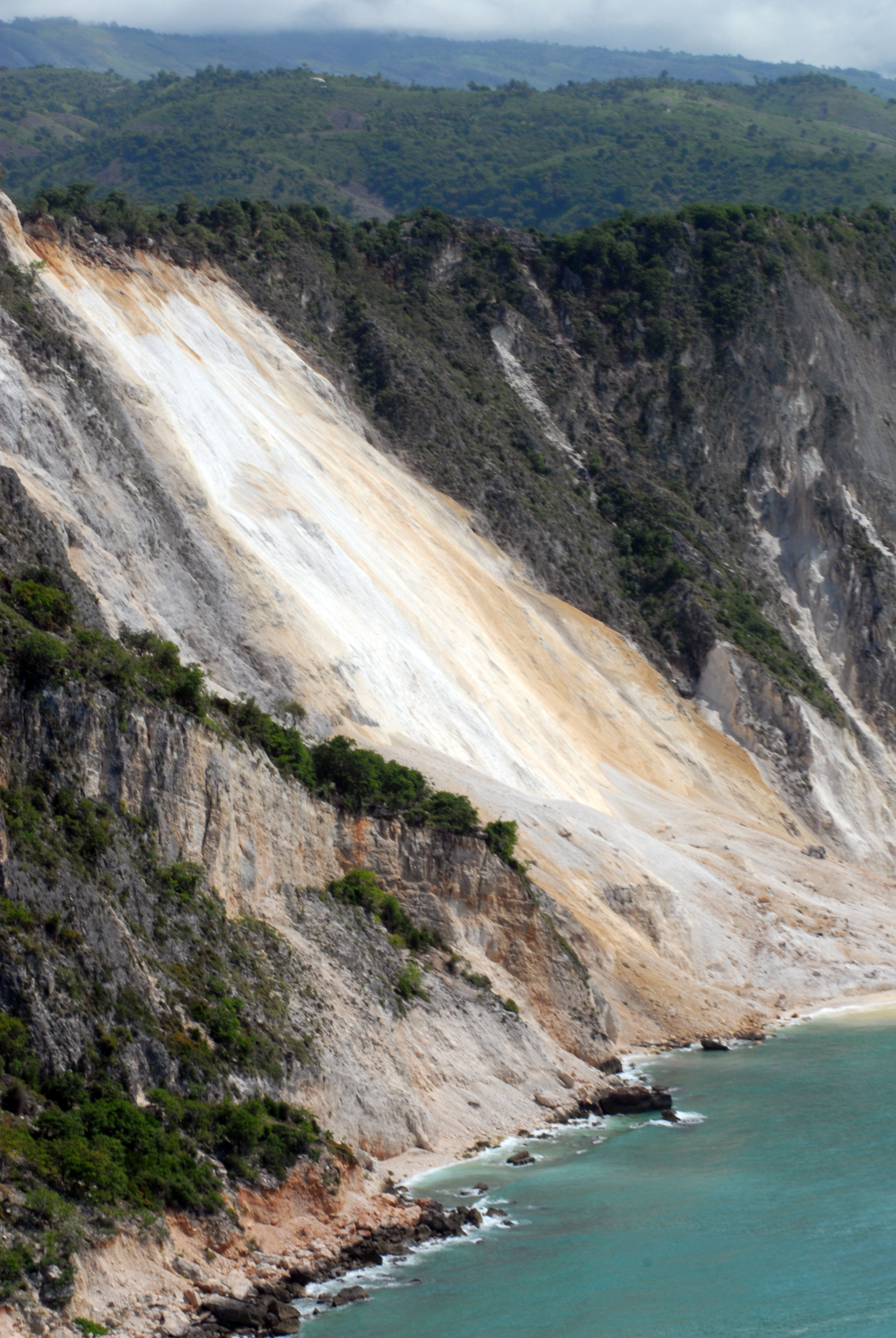
- Interactive map of Belle-Anse
- Location in Haiti
- Coordinates: 18°14′17″N 72°04′08″W
- Country: Haiti
- Department: Sud-Est
- Arrondissement: Belle-Anse

Area
  - Total: 381.27 km^{2} (147.21 sq mi)
- Elevation: 0 m (0 ft)

Population (2015)
  - Total: 75,951
  - Density: 199.21/km^{2} (515.94/sq mi)
- Demonym: Belle-Ansois
- Time zone: UTC−05:00 (EST)
  - Summer (DST): UTC−04:00 (EDT)
- Postal code: HT 9310

Belle-Anse (French pronunciation: [bɛl ɑ̃s]; Haitian Creole: Bèlans) is a commune in the Belle-Anse Arrondissement, in the Sud-Est department of Haiti. It has 51,707 inhabitants.

== History ==
The town's previous name was Saltrou, a name that is still commonly used by some oldtimers. The name Saltrou was changed during the 1960's through the efforts of a well-known Deputy named Hugo Paul. He served during the early years of the presidency of Dr. François Duvalier. He died in office, and the circumstances of his death are still questionable. According to most, he died of a stroke. One cannot speak of the new name Belle-Anse without referring to Hugo Paul. The inspiration came to Mr. Paul when coming down the hill of Tapion. The panoramic view thrilled him and he called it, Belle-Anse. (Mr. Paul was a graduate of l'Université de Paris-Sorbonne.) Though many claim that Belle-Anse is a new town, this is far from the truth. There is at least one house that goes back to colonial time, if not destroyed by hurricanes or the recent earthquake of January 2010.

== Geography and Climate ==
Belle-Anse is located at the bottom of several hills, a position that makes it vulnerable to flash floods. Flash floods are more common during the hurricane and the rainy seasons, which are between the months of March–June and the months of August–October.

== Transportation ==
Motor boats (chaloupes) remain the most important travel methods between Belle-Anse and other nearby cities and towns. Though there is a road that links Belle-Anse to Thiotte and Port-au-Prince, there is no regular scheduled bus travel. One possibility to get from Port-au-Prince to Belle-Anse is to travel from Port-au-Prince to Jacmel by bus or plane. Sometimes the bus will go all the way to Marigot. From Marigot or Jacmel, a chaloupe should be available for the port of Belle-Anse.

Travel on these boats can sometimes be risky. They operate in the dark of the night without any light.

In 1995 a small French airliner crashed fatally near Belle-Anse.

== Education ==
There are several elementary schools. One is run by the government, and a few other ones have been established through partnerships with foreign organisations. Education, beyond elementary level, still remains a challenge. For years, L'Ecole Vocationelle de Belle-Anse was the only means to obtain a partial secondary education. At that school, the focus was, and still is on trade skills, instead of academic subjects. Those who wish to obtain an academic secondary school education have to travel to Port-au-Prince or Jacmel. A complete and solid secondary education still remains a need and a challenge for many Belle-Ansois.

== Economy of Belle-Anse ==
Belle-Anse is one of the poorest cities in Haiti, and many people survive by fishing. The town sells fish to other nearby towns and Port-au-Prince. During the 60s and 70s, there was a group of middlemen who did very well by buying coffee from the local peasants and selling it to exporters in Jacmel and Port-au-Prince.

== Health Care ==
There is not a hospital in Belle-Anse. A clinic provides basic medical care. It is staffed by only one nurse most of the time. People rely on the St. Michel Hospital in Jacmel for acute medical care. In some circumstances, it is the local houngan who provides medical care by using his knowledge of natural medicine.
