= Pauleus Vital =

Pauleus Vital was a Haitian artist. He was born in Jacmel, in October 1917. He grew up learning to build boats, and cabinets. At age 21 he moved to Port-au-Prince to further his building career. At age 38, Vital started to paint, after his half-brother Prefete Duffaut, introduced him to Centre d’Art. He spent 3 years at Centre d’Art, then moved back to Jacmel in 1959. Much of the motivation for his work comes from his home by the river in Jacmel. His work consists of detailed paintings, of everything from Haitian courtyards, countryside’s, and subterranean Vodou ceremonies. His paintings are relatively small and vary in size from around 24”x20” and up to 24” x 48”. He died on June 18, 1984, at age 66, while undergoing heart surgery.

== Principal exhibitions and works ==
- Ceremony for Ogoun, 1996. oil on board: 48” x 24”. from the Rodman Collection at Ramapo College of New Jersey in Mahwah New Jersey
- Landscape at Sables Cabaret, 1981, oil on canvas: 29”x23” from the Rodman Collection at Ramapo College of New Jersey in Mahwah New Jersey
- Jacob’s Ladder, 1974, oil on board: 30”x40” from the collection of Waterloo Center for the Arts in Waterloo, Iowa.

== Public collections ==
Vital has art work in collections throughout the United States, including, but not limited to, the permanent collection of Milwaukee Museum of Art, The Waterloo Center for the Arts in Iowa, and the Ramapo College in Mahwah, New Jersey. He is represented by Treadway Toomey Gallery of Chicago and his work is also in the Chicago Gallery of Haitian art. Several pieces have been sold at auctions into private collections, and continue to do so.
