= Singing Rooster =

Wisconsin-based non-profit corporation

Singing Rooster logo

Singing Rooster Inc. is a certified 501(c)3 non-profit corporation which works to alleviate rural poverty in Haiti with economic development through coffee agriculture.

== History ==
Singing Rooster was founded in 2009 in Madison, Wisconsin.

In August 2012, Hurricane Isaac destroyed the roof of a processing center in Thiotte; Singing Rooster aided in reconstruction in time for the 2012-13 harvest.

In 2016, Singing Rooster began to import chocolate from Haiti.

== Activities ==
Singing Rooster partners with small scale, farmer-owned coffee co-operatives to provide farmers direct access to markets in a farmer-to-table model.

Singing Rooster provides farmers with low interest pre-harvest financing through a partnership with Root Capital and assistance with crop improvement, and the farmers are paid higher than average prices for their harvest. Singing Rooster then sells goods directly to end-consumers and retailers, with the result that farmers earn living wages and contribute to the economy of their villages.

Singing Rooster provides training to co-operatives in small business management and income diversification. Coffee tree seedlings are provided for crop re-invigoration and reforestation. A coffee seedling nursery above Marigot is a joint project funded by Singing Rooster, Solidarité-Haïti, and three local farmer co-operatives (using proceeds from coffee sales).

Singing Rooster partners with the Bank Inter-American of Development and the Haitian Ministry of Agriculture's DEFI's program to repair equipment, improve coffee quality and provide business training in Dondon, Haiti. The organization collaborates with the Catholic Relief Services in the Beaumont commune, the French organization, InterAide, in Artibonite, and Oxfam in Les Cayes to facilitate coffee production and develop export opportunities.

Singing Rooster also exports, imports, transports and warehouses green coffee, and facilitates its transformation into roasted coffee and other value-added products. Proceeds from coffee sales are returned to Haiti to support work in rural communities for business growth and development.
