= Alexandre Grégoire =

Haitian painter

- Born: August 29, 1922; Jacmel, Haiti
- Died: July 28, 2001 (aged 78); Jacmel, Haiti
- Known for: Painting
- Movement: Naïve art

Alexandre Grégoire (August 29, 1922 – July 28, 2001) was a Haitian painter who typically depicted scenes of Vodou, daily life, and historical events in the naïve style.

Born in Jacmel, Grégoire was educated from 1930 to 1937 by the Christian Teaching Brothers, and then studied cabinet making at the Jacmel vocational school for two years. In 1939 he joined the army and played the tuba and saxophone in the army band. He stayed in the army until the 1950s; during the presidency of Paul Magloire he left the military and joined the band at the National Palace.

In 1968, with the encouragement of his friends Préfete Duffaut and Pierre-Joseph Valcin and the help of the Centre d'Art in Port-au-Prince, Grégoire began painting.

Paintings by Alexandre Grégoire have been sold by the Friends of HAS Haiti to raise funds for the Hôpital Albert Schweitzer Haiti, located in Deschapelles.
