= Bainet Arrondissement =

Coordinates: 18.1831°N 72.75°W

Bainet Arrondissement Arrondissement de Bainet Awondisman Benè
- Arrondissement
- Interactive map of Bainet Arrondissement
- Country: Haiti
- Department: Sud-Est

Area
  - Arrondissement: 462.63 km^{2} (178.62 sq mi)
  - Urban: 1.09 km^{2} (0.42 sq mi)
  - Rural: 461.54 km^{2} (178.20 sq mi)

Population (2015)
  - Arrondissement: 135,792
  - Density: 293.52/km^{2} (760.22/sq mi)
  - Urban: 6,473
  - Rural: 129,319
- Time zone: UTC-5 (Eastern)
- Postal code: HT92—
- Communes: 2
- Communal Sections: 15
- IHSI Code: 022

Bainet (Haitian Creole: Benè) is an arrondissement in the Sud-Est department of Haiti. As of 2015, the population was 135,792 inhabitants. Postal codes in the Bainet Arrondissement start with the number 92.

== Communes ==
The arrondissement consists of the following communes:

- Bainet
- Côtes-de-Fer
