= Prinair Flight 277 =

1969 aircraft accident in Puerto Rico

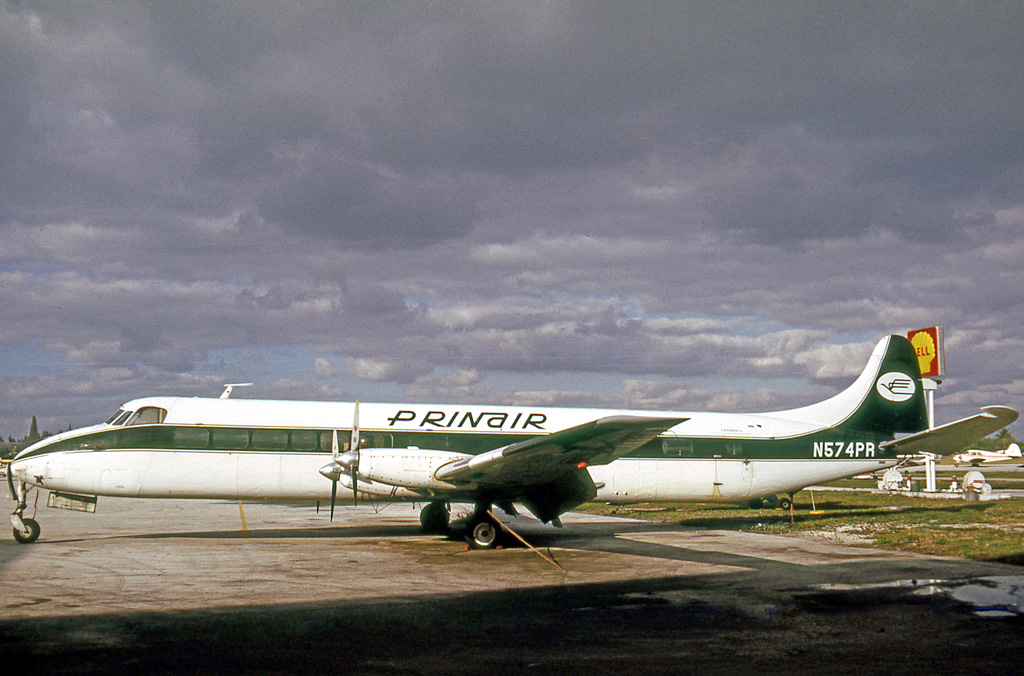
- A Prinair Heron, similar to the accident aircraft

Accident
- Date: March 5, 1969
- Summary: Controlled flight into terrain caused by ATC error
- Site: Fajardo, Puerto Rico; 18°17′15″N 65°49′30″W

Aircraft
- Aircraft type: de Havilland DH.114 Heron 2B
- Operator: Prinair
- Registration: N563PR
- Flight origin: Harry S. Truman Airport, Charlotte Amalie
- Destination: Isla Verde International Airport, San Juan
- Passengers: 17
- Crew: 2
- Fatalities: 19
- Survivors: 0

Prinair Flight 277 was a regular passenger flight by Puerto Rican airline Prinair, between Harry S. Truman Airport in Charlotte Amalie, U.S. Virgin Islands, and Isla Verde International Airport in Carolina, Puerto Rico, a suburb of San Juan. On March 5, 1969, the flight, operated by a de Havilland Heron 2D N563PR, crashed into a mountain near Fajardo, killing all 19 occupants on board.

== Flight ==
Prinair Flight 277 left Charlotte Amalie at 5:15 p.m. on Wednesday, March 5, 1969, for a short flight to the San Juan area's main airport in Carolina. It was an uneventful flight until the airplane entered mainland Puerto Rico. This was the point in which the airplane's pilot contacted San Juan's approach control, letting them know that they were flying at 4,000 feet (1,200 m) and maintaining that flight level.

Then, the airport's approach controller responded with, "Prinair two seven seven San Juan Approach Control radar contact three miles east of Isla Verde fly a heading of two five zero for a vector to ILS final maintain four thousand." The approach controller, who was a trainee on the fateful afternoon, mistakenly thought that Prinair Flight 277 was near San Juan, but it was instead near Luquillo at what is described as the "Fajardo intersection". One minute after this communication, Prinair Flight 277 was asked to go to flight level 3, or 3,000 feet (900 m) and prepare for landing. The airplane was vectored for a landing into runway 7. The plane's pilots, trusting that the information given to them was correct, followed the instructions and prepared for landing, soon finding themselves in front of an unavoidable mountain instead. At 5:38 pm, 23 minutes after the flight took off from St. Thomas, it crashed into some trees on the Sierra Luquillo mountains, killing everyone on board.

== Investigation ==
An NTSB investigation that followed discovered that this accident would not have been survivable in any way. The controller's home and belongings were investigated as part of the investigation and it was found he had a typical family life, along with some of the furnishings and electrical objects found at a typical family house.

On March 17, 1969, the controller revealed to investigators, that 3 years before, a flight surgeon had sent him to see both a psychiatrist and a psychologist, and that on March 5, the day of the accident, he was feeling very tense and anxious.

It was noted also that the accident area had several peaks that were over 3,000 feet (900 m) and that the weather conditions during that day would have prevented the pilots from seeing the peaks ahead of them.

The controller's erroneous indications meant he thought the aircraft was 10 miles (16 km) further west than it actually was. About 5:33 p.m., or five minutes before the crash, the flight coordinator's supervisor ordered him to go perform other duties, and then proceeded to give the controller's instructor instructions to go and do collateral duties. By then, the controller was directing 5 flights, including Prinair Flight 277. Some pilots on these five flights were heard complaining because the instructor's own transmissions were interrupting the controller's.

Several other key elements were discovered by the investigation.

== See also ==
- Controlled flight into terrain
- List of accidents and incidents involving commercial aircraft
- Similar accidents and incidents:
  - 1995 Air St. Martin Beech 1900 crash
  - Air New Zealand Flight 901
  - Alaska Airlines Flight 1866
  - Avianca Flight 011
  - Aviateca Flight 901
  - Independent Air Flight 1851
  - PIA Flight 268
