= Anse-à-Pitres =

Anse-à-Pitres: Ansapit
- Commune
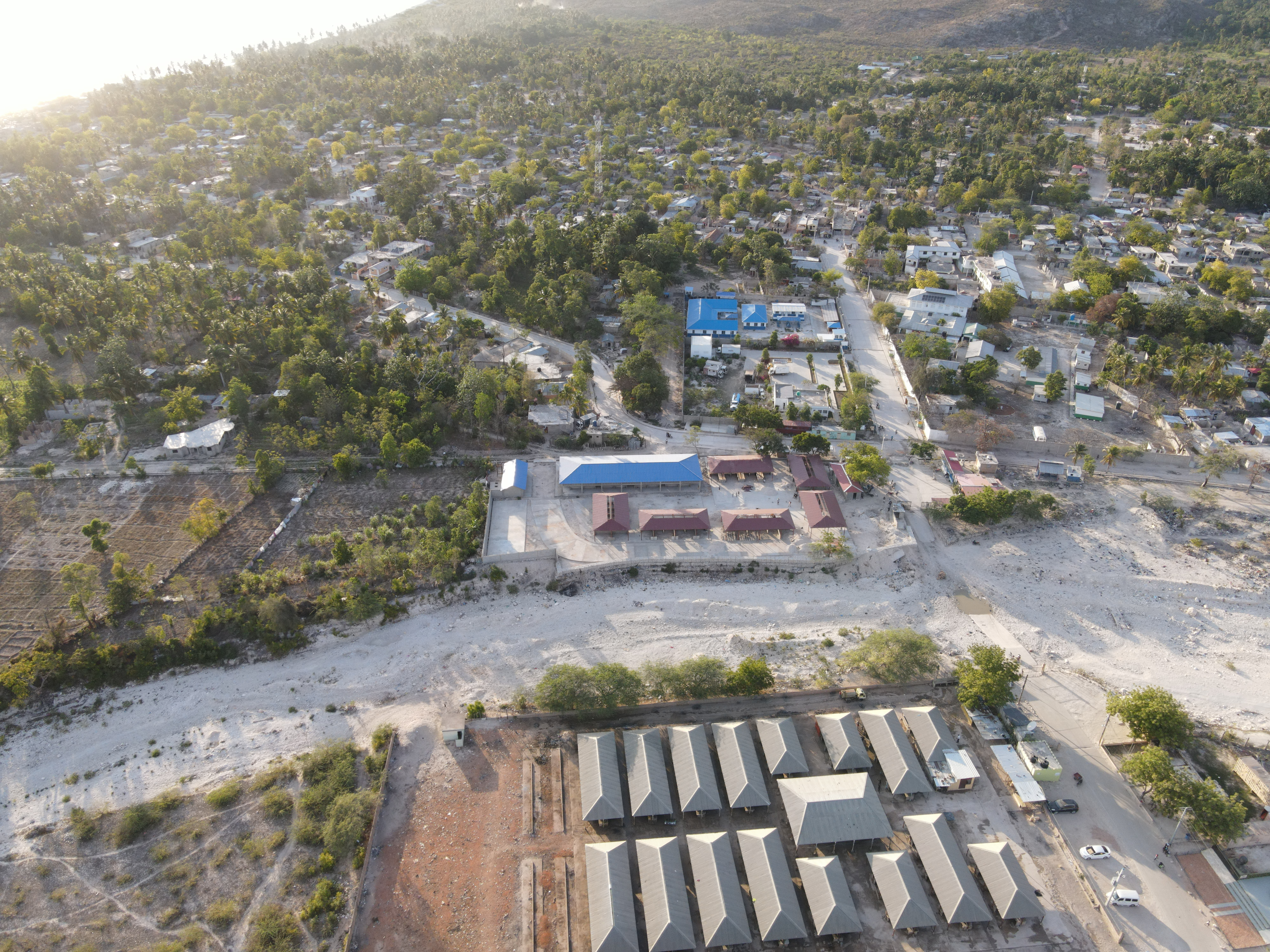
- Interactive map of Anse-à-Pitres
- Location in Haiti
- Coordinates: 18°3′0″N 71°45′0″W
- Country: Haiti
- Department: Sud-Est
- Arrondissement: Belle-Anse

Area
  - Total: 185.19 km^{2} (71.50 sq mi)
- Elevation: 20 m (66 ft)

Population (2015)
  - Total: 30,146
  - Density: 162.78/km^{2} (421.61/sq mi)
- Time zone: UTC−05:00 (EST)
  - Summer (DST): UTC−04:00 (EDT)
- Postal code: HT 9340

Anse-à-Pitres (French pronunciation: [ɑ̃s a pitʁ]; Haitian Creole: Ansapit), or Anse-à-Pitre is a commune in the Belle-Anse Arrondissement, in the Sud-Est department of Haiti. Its border crossing to Pedernales is one of the four chief land crossings to the Dominican Republic.
