= Grand-Gosier =

Grand-Gosier Gran Gozye
- Commune
- Interactive map of Grand-Gosier
- Location in Haiti
- Coordinates: 18°11′0″N 71°55′0″W
- Country: Haiti
- Department: Sud-Est
- Arrondissement: Belle-Anse

Area
  - Total: 83.91 km^{2} (32.40 sq mi)
- Elevation: 145 m (476 ft)

Population (2015)
  - Total: 17,059
  - Density: 203.3/km^{2} (526.5/sq mi)
- Time zone: UTC−05:00 (EST)
  - Summer (DST): UTC−04:00 (EDT)
- Postal code: HT 9320

Grand-Gosier (French pronunciation: [ɡʁɑ̃ ɡozje]; Haitian Creole: Gran Gozye) is a commune in the Belle-Anse Arrondissement, in the Sud-Est department of Haiti. It has 17,059 inhabitants.

It is the birthplace of celebrated Haitian poet and Haitian Creole language advocate Félix Morisseau-Leroy.
