= Préfète Duffaut =

Haitian painter

- Born: 1 January 1923; Cyvadier, Haiti
- Died: 6 October 2012 (aged 89); Port-au-Prince, Haiti
- Known for: Painting
- Style: Naïve
- Movement: Vernacular art

Préfète Duffaut (1 January 1923 – 6 October 2012) was a Haitian painter.

== Biography ==
Born in Cyvadier, Sud-Est, near the seaport of Jacmel, where he lived and worked. The painter Pauleus Vital (1918–1984) was Duffaut's half-brother, the painter Jean Charles Duffaut (*1970) is his son. Duffaut's mother died when he was two years old, and he was mostly raised by his father, a sailboat builder in Jacmel.

In 1944, he introduced himself to Rigaud Benoit who was then visiting Jacmel as a talent scout for the recently created Centre d'Art of Port-au-Prince. In 1948, encouraged by Bill Kraus - an American journalist and artist living in Haiti, Duffaut joined the Centre d'Art in the Haitian capital. There began working alongside important Haitian artists such as Gesner Abelard and Hector Hyppolite. Later, he joined the Galerie Issa, where he worked for many years.

In 1951, Duffaut was one of several artists invited to paint murals in the interior of the Cathedral of Sainte Trinité (largely destroyed in the January 2010 earthquake) in Port-au-Prince; his works there were titled "The Temptation of Christ" and "The Processional Road" (also referred to as the "Procession of the Crossing Guard").

Sometimes referred to as the foremost "dreamer" of the Haitian artists in modern times, Duffaut is above all a naïve painter. His earlier works portray highly precise depictions of his hometown. Later, he began shifting towards his own style, described as both sophisticated, fantastic and highly imaginative. He is known for painting in the vernacular style and his work typically consists of fantastical "imaginary cities" (villes imaginaires), that often contain coastal elements with boats. The cityscapes are strongly influenced by the coastal city of Jacmel. Another recurrent theme, especially in earlier works, is imagery associated with Vodou.

Duffaut's work has been exhibited and collected widely outside of Haiti. His body of paintings continues to be a strong influence on contemporary Haitian artists such as Prince Luc (Luckner Candio).
