= 1995 Air Saint-Martin Beechcraft 1900 crash =

1995 aviation accident in Haiti

- A Beechcraft 1900D, similar to the aircraft involved

Accident
- Date: 7 December 1995
- Summary: Controlled flight into terrain
- Site: Chaîne de la Selle, near Belle-Anse, Haiti

Aircraft
- Aircraft type: Beechcraft 1900D
- Operator: Air Saint Martin
- Registration: F-OHRK
- Flight origin: Cayenne – Félix Eboué Airport, Cayenne, French Guiana
- Stopover: Pointe-à-Pitre International Airport, Pointe-à-Pitre, Guadeloupe
- Destination: Toussaint Louverture International Airport, Port-au-Prince, Haiti
- Occupants: 20
- Passengers: 18
- Crew: 2
- Fatalities: 20
- Survivors: 0

On 7 December 1995, an Air Saint Martin Beechcraft 1900D on approach to Port-au-Prince, Haiti, after flying from Cayenne, French Guiana, via a stopover in Pointe-à-Pitre, Guadeloupe, crashed into a mountain in the Chaîne de la Selle, killing all 20 occupants on board. The flight was chartered by the Government of France to deport illegal immigrants and was carrying 18 passengers and 2 crew members: 16 Haitian immigrants, 2 French police officers, and 2 French pilots.

Whilst flying from Guadeloupe to Haiti, the aircraft deviated from its scheduled route by more than 10 nautical miles (19 km). The crew failed to realize their actual position, and one minute after being cleared to descend on approach to Port-au-Prince, the flight crashed into a mountain.

== Background ==
In 1986, Bernard Pons, who was then the Minister of the Overseas, adopted a law that introduced tax breaks for investment in France's overseas territories. The resulting real-estate boom attracted workers from across the Caribbean to the French overseas territories in the Americas. However, a subsequent economic recession made these immigrants "unwelcome". After Hurricane Luis passed over Saint Martin in September 1995, the extent of illegal immigration on the island was brought to the attention of Minister of the Overseas Jean-Jacques de Peretti.

In response, de Peretti introduced a voluntary "return assistance" program, where immigrants were offered a seat on a flight and free transportation by ship for 2 m^{3} (71 ft^{3}) of luggage per person. The plan did not achieve the expected results, and a more forceful policy of deportation was subsequently adopted. The Ministry of the Interior then chartered numerous small aircraft from local airlines, providing assistance to these airlines that were experiencing financial difficulties. At the time of the crash, Guadeloupe deported 1,100 people annually, whilst French Guiana deported 4,000 undocumented foreigners annually.

== Aircraft and crew ==
The aircraft involved, manufactured in 1994, was a Beechcraft 1900D registered as F-OHRK. A twin-engine turboprop aircraft, it was powered by two Pratt & Whitney Canada PT6A-67D engines. Owned and operated by Air Saint Martin, the aircraft was conducting a charter flight from Cayenne – Félix Eboué Airport, Cayenne, French Guiana, to Toussaint Louverture International Airport, Port-au-Prince, Haiti, via a stopover at Pointe-à-Pitre International Airport, Pointe-à-Pitre, Guadeloupe.

The aircraft was carrying 20 occupants, including 18 passengers consisting of 16 Haitian immigrants and 2 French police officers stationed in French Guiana, and 2 French pilots. Three of the Haitian passengers were children. The prefect of French Guiana had issued a deportation order for fifteen of the immigrants, while the 16th immigrant had been issued a deportation order by the prefect of Guadeloupe and boarded the flight at the stopover in Pointe-à-Pitre.

== Accident ==
On 7 December 1995, the aircraft took off from Cayenne at 12:00 EST, and proceeded to its stopover at Pointe-à-Pitre. After refuelling, the aircraft took off from the airport at around 15:00 for Port-au-Prince where it was scheduled to land at Toussaint Louverture International Airport at around 18:00 EST. Whilst en route to the airport, unbeknownst to the crew, the aircraft had drifted more than 10 nautical miles (19 km) off course. The pilot then reported passing a reporting point, despite having not passed over it. The pilot then reported passing over the airport's VOR station, and in preparation for an approach to the airport, air traffic control cleared the crew to descend to 4,000 feet (1,200 m). One minute later, at around 17:54, the aircraft crashed into a mountain in the Chaîne de la Selle at an altitude of 5,030 feet (1,530 m). All 20 occupants on board were killed.

At around 18:30, air traffic control lost contact with the aircraft. At 20:30, the crash site was pinpointed using a distress signal from the aircraft's emergency locator transmitter that was picked up by a satellite. The terrain surrounding the crash site made the wreckage difficult to access. In addition, rescue helicopters could only access the site the following morning due to heavy rain, when a United Nations helicopter for the United Nations Mission in Haiti located the wreckage.

== Aftermath ==
On 9 January 1996, the Government of Haiti held national funerals in Port-au-Prince for the Haitian passengers.

== Investigation ==
The investigation fell under the authority of the Haiti Civil Aviation Authorities (HCAA). At the time of the accident, the weather in Port-au-Prince was clear. Visual meteorological conditions were present and the flight was under instrument flight rules. On 11 January 1996, a French source authorized to speak about the investigation revealed that the aircraft had starting flying off course from the Dominican Republic, but that the reason had yet to be determined.

== See also ==
- Prinair Flight 277
