= Creole Renaissance =

The Creole Renaissance is a movement which established Creole as legitimate literary language, started in large part by authors like Felix Morisseau-Leroy, who struggled successfully to make Haitian Creole the literary, educational, and official language of Haiti. This grew, in part, out of the Negritude and Haitian Indigenism movements and the Harlem Renaissance.
