= Côtes-de-Fer =

Côtes-de-Fer Kòtfè
- Commune
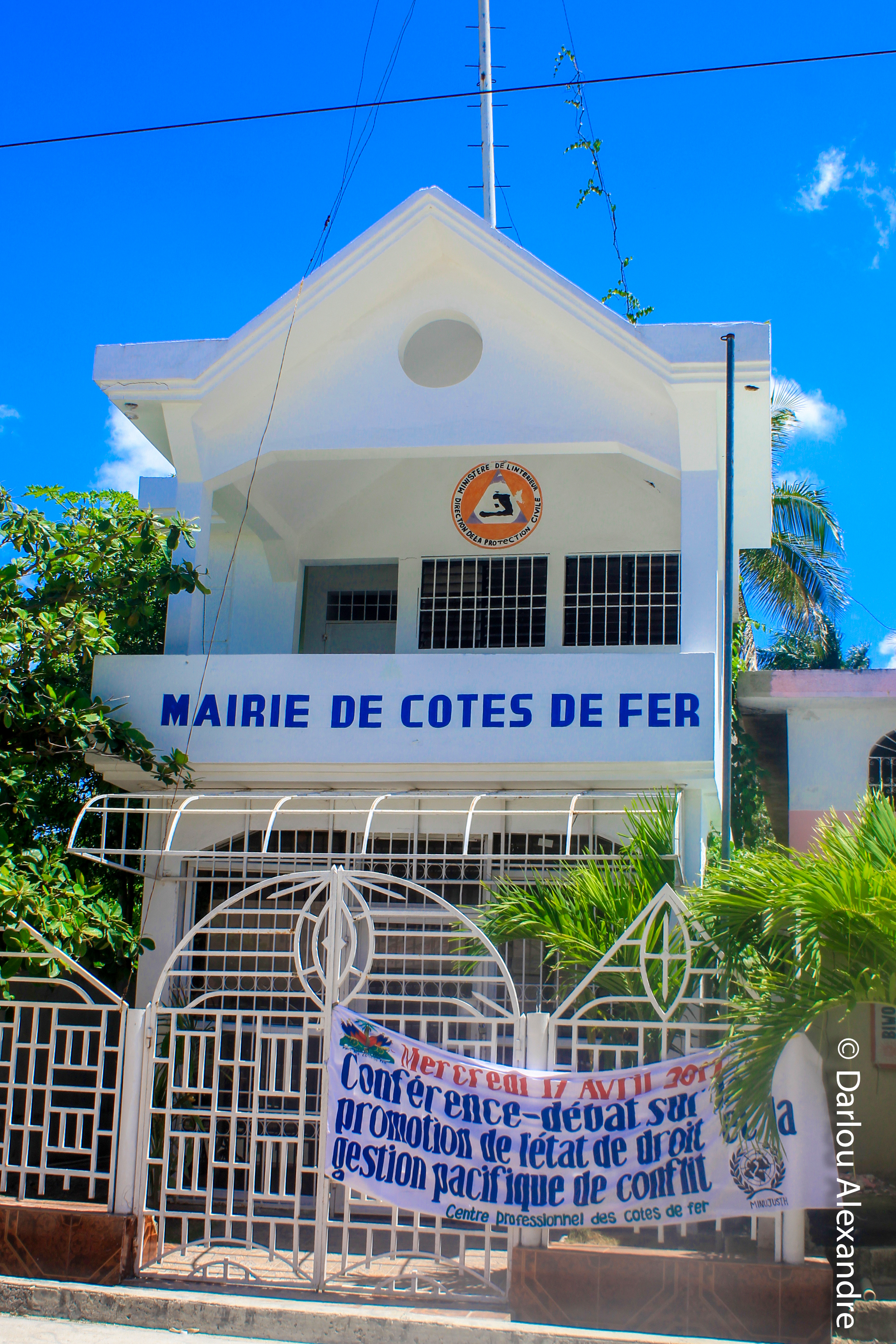
- Town hall
- Interactive map of Côtes-de-Fer
- Location in Haiti
- Coordinates: 18°11′0″N 73°0′0″W
- Country: Haiti
- Department: Sud-Est
- Arrondissement: Bainet

Area
  - Total: 162.03 km^{2} (62.56 sq mi)
- Elevation: 20 m (66 ft)

Population (2015)
  - Total: 49,037
  - Density: 302.64/km^{2} (783.84/sq mi)
- Time zone: UTC−05:00 (EST)
  - Summer (DST): UTC−04:00 (EDT)
- Postal code: HT 9220

Côtes-de-Fer (French pronunciation: [kot də fɛʁ]; Haitian Creole: Kòt Defè) is a commune in the Bainet Arrondissement, in the Sud-Est department of Haiti. It has 49,037 inhabitants.

In 2014, the government of Michel Martelly produced a plan to develop up to 8,000 acres of the coastline as part of a plan to generate tourism on the island. The plans included both an international airport and a seaport, hotels, villas, restaurants and sports complexes. Both former Prime Minister Laurent Lamothe and for Minister of Tourism and Creative Industries Stéphanie Villedrouin promoted the plan heavily during their tenures.
