= Jacmel Arrondissement =

Coordinates: 18.2333°N 72.5333°W

Jacmel Arrondissement Arrondissement de Jacmel Awondisman Jakmèl
- Arrondissement
- Interactive map of Jacmel Arrondissement
- Country: Haiti
- Department: Sud-Est

Area
  - Arrondissement: 794.77 km^{2} (306.86 sq mi)
  - Urban: 10.17 km^{2} (3.93 sq mi)
  - Rural: 784.6 km^{2} (302.9 sq mi)

Population (2015)
  - Arrondissement: 338,728
  - Density: 426.20/km^{2} (1,103.8/sq mi)
  - Urban: 62,211
  - Rural: 276,517
- Time zone: UTC-5 (Eastern)
- Postal codes: HT91—
- Communes: 4
- Communal Sections: 23
- IHSI Code: 021

Jacmel (Haitian Creole: Jakmèl) is an arrondissement in the Sud-Est department of Haiti. As of 2015, the population was 338,728 inhabitants.

Postal codes in the Jacmel Arrondissement start with the number 91.

The arrondissement consists of the following communes:

- Jacmel
- Cayes-Jacmel
- La Vallée
- Marigot

== History ==
=== 2010 magnitude 7.0 earthquake ===
Jacmel, a city with many French colonial heritage buildings, was devastated by a 7.0 magnitude tremblor on 12 January 2010, collapsing much of its heritage architecture.

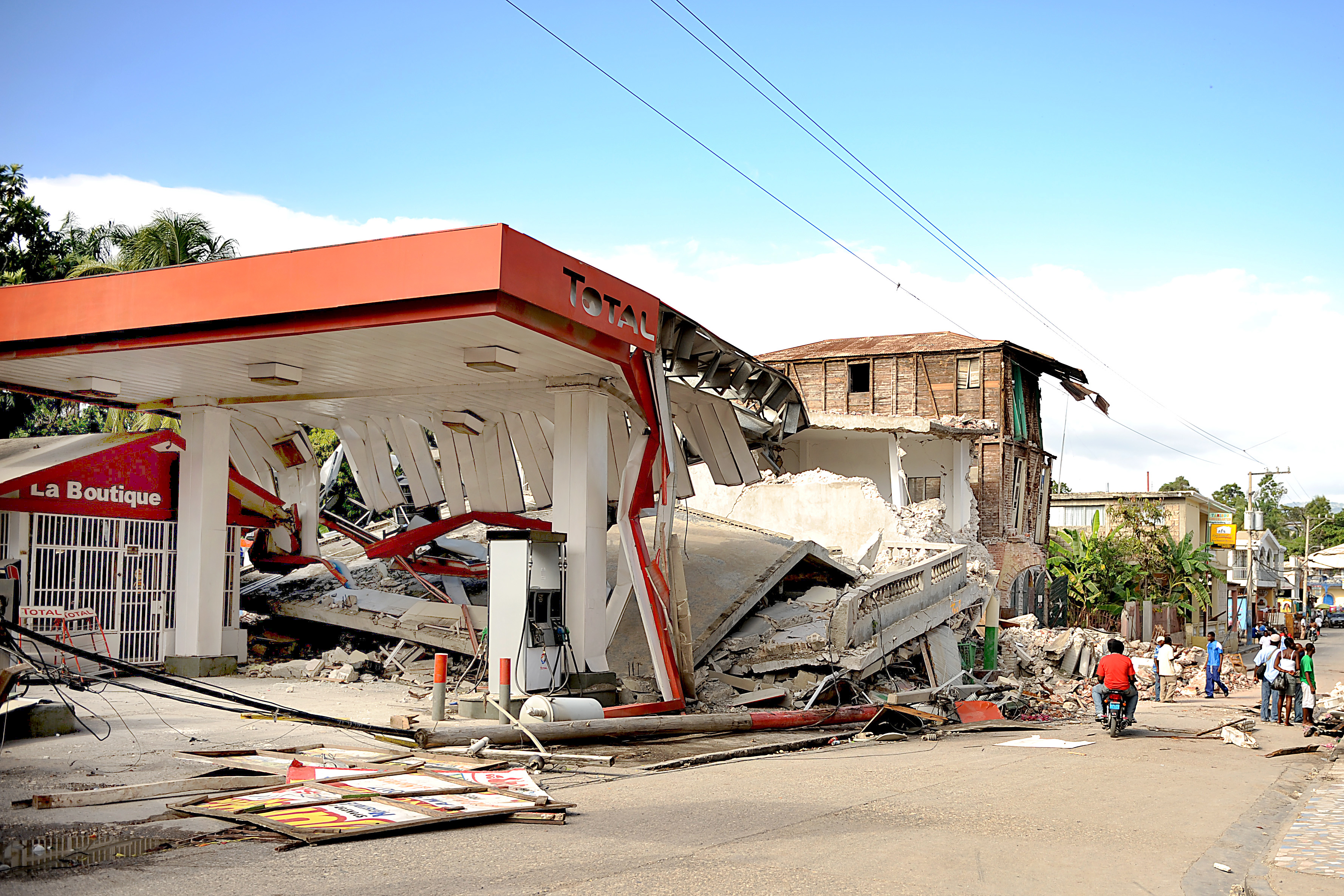
Buildings in Jacmel, Haiti that were destroyed by the 2010 earthquake.

==== Recovery ====
In December 2010, the Capponi Construction Group, a Miami-based construction company decided to help with the revitalization of a Jacmel. This initiative was created to help stimulate a self-sustained tourism economy for Haiti. Michael Capponi, founder of the Capponi Group, formed the Jacmel Advisory Council to help revitalize Jacmel, while preserving its arts, culture and traditions. The board promotes best practices to provide a socio-economic system for thousands of Haitians living in the south east region. Capponi Group Haiti is also restoring a 200-year-old coffee sorting house on the port of Jacmel.

== Facilities ==
The largest health centre/hospital in the region is Saint-Michel in Jacmel. It was severely damaged in the 12 January 2010 earthquake.
