= La Vallée-de-Jacmel =

La Vallée-de-Jacmel Lavale
- Commune
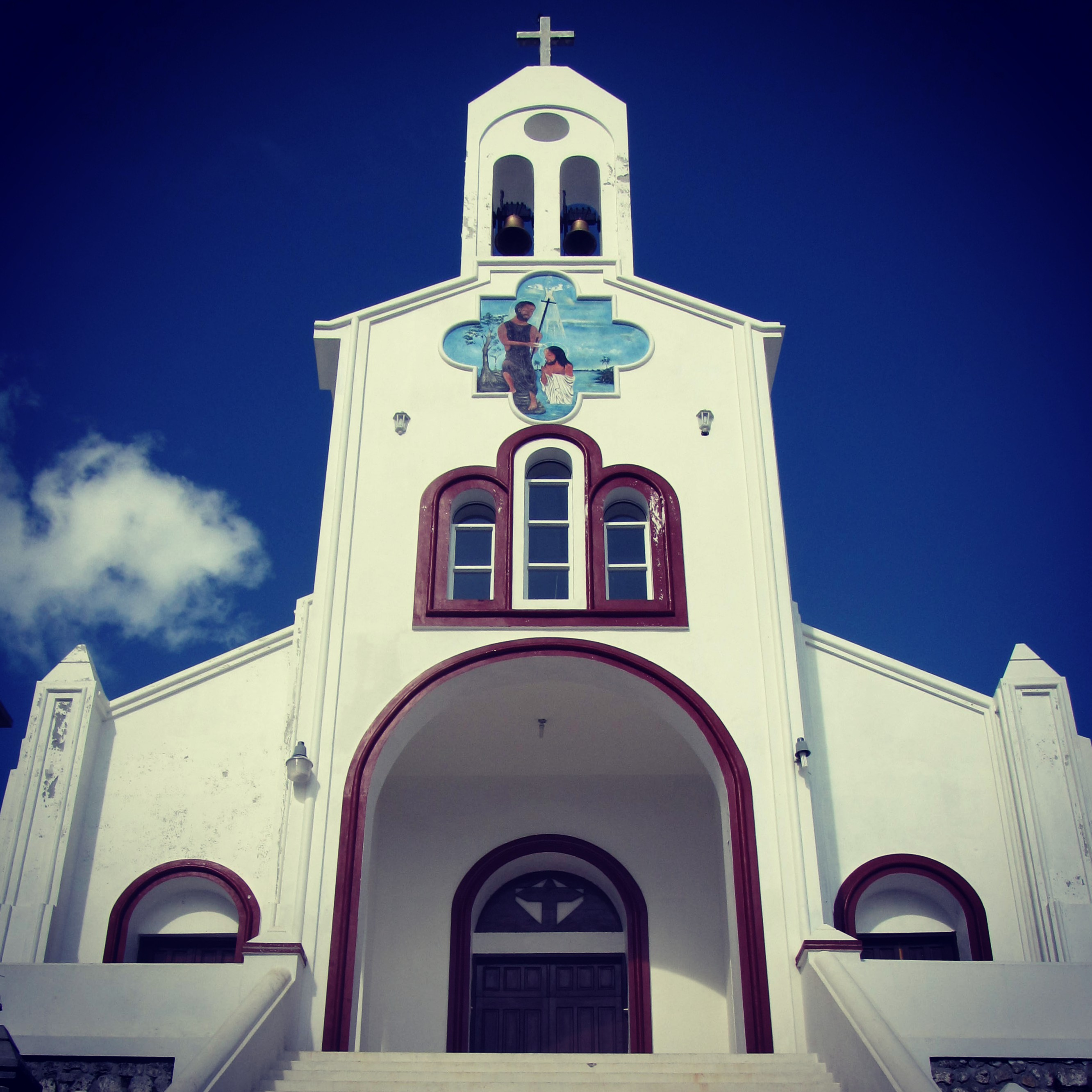
- Eglise de Saint Jean-Baptiste
- Interactive map of La Vallée-de-Jacmel
- Location in Haiti
- Coordinates: 18°16′0″N 72°40′0″W
- Country: Haiti
- Department: Sud-Est
- Arrondissement: Jacmel

Area
  - Total: 84.79 km^{2} (32.74 sq mi)
- Elevation: 800 m (2,600 ft)

Population (2015)
  - Total: 36,427
  - Density: 429.6/km^{2} (1,113/sq mi)
- Time zone: UTC−05:00 (EST)
  - Summer (DST): UTC−04:00 (EDT)
- Postal code: HT 9140

La Vallée-de-Jacmel (French pronunciation: [la vale də ʒakmɛl]; Haitian Creole: Lavale) is a commune in the Jacmel Arrondissement, in the Sud-Est department of Haiti. It has 36,427 inhabitants.

== Geography ==
Situated between the communes of Jacmel et Bainet. The name La Vallée de Jacmel could translate as "The Valley of Jacmel" but it is located 800 meters above sea level.

== Demography ==
As of March 2009 La Vallée had 36,188 inhabitants. The small urbanized area of Ridoré had 1039 people with 239 households, roughly about 3.13% of the total population. The area's population has a slightly higher than average mixed-race population. It is believed descended from French colonists and Polish Haitians, descendants of Polish soldiers who ended up siding with former slaves in the Haitians Revolution.

La Vallée has an extensive diaspora in the United States and Canada due to a substantial emigration beginning in the 1950s.

== Administration ==
Ridoré is La Vallée's administrative district. The other sublocalities are:

- Morne-à-Bruler
- Muzac
- Ternier.

== History ==
La Vallée really started to gain importance by 1910 when it was raised as a parish. The first resident priest was Léon Bonnaud, from Brittany, France. Father Bonnaud played a major part in the development of the area; he supervised construction of its first masonry buildings. These included the Presbytery in 1912, St John the Baptist parish church, completed in 1922; the boys' school, école Léonce Mégie in 1926; and the girls' school, école St Paul, inaugurated in 1931. Bonnaud had been called to return to France shortly before the girls' school was completed. He also built the first dispensary, and restructured and enlarged the local open air market, one of the most important in the area.

La Vallée was a pioneer in the Haitian "cooperative movement" with the founding of the historic "Caisse Populaire" in 1946. An association of locals created CODEVA in 1975, an organization that initiated many development projects, such as building the St Joseph hospital and the Lycée Philippe Jules.

== Places of interest ==
- St John the Baptist church, completed in 1922.
- Bust of Fr. Bonnaud, founder of the parish.
- L'Etang river and waterfalls
- The Séjourné pit, one of the deepest in the Caribbean, 167 meters.

== Notable residents ==
- Leon Bonnaud, a Roman Catholic priest from Brittany, was influential here for more than a decade.
- Marie Carmelle Jean-Marie, Haitian minister of Economy and Finances
- Marc L. Laroche, author, Anacaona.
- Msgr. Pétion Laroche, former Roman Catholic bishop of Hinche.
- Ing. François Laroche, highly talented architect engineer, and nephew of Msgr. Léonard Pétion Laroche. The magnificent Cathedral Immaculée Conception of Hinche is among his architectural works. He is the first Haitian to design and build such a construction.
- Cardinal Chibly Langlois, bishop of Les Cayes, was born in La Vallée.

== Facilities ==
The commune is home to the Saint Joseph hospital.

== Sister City ==
- Covina, California, United States announced plans to become sister cities with La Vallée.
