= 2022 Haiti floods =

Floods in Haiti

- Date: 2022
- Location: Haiti
- Type: Flooding
- Deaths: 10
- Injuries: 0
- Missing: 1

Between January 31, 2022 - February 1, 2022, heavy rains in Haiti caused floods. On February 1, five people were killed by the floods, with one more person missing. Thousands of homes were flooded and as many as 2,500 families were displaced by the floods, Areas affected included the areas north of Caribbean county, Cap-Haïtien. Heavy winds also knocked down several trees.

On March 7, a storm hit the Puerto Plata province of the Dominican Republic and the Nord Department of Haiti, leaving 2 Haitians dead.

On September 1, a flood destroyed upwards of 350 homes and killed 3 in the Ouest Department.

== See also ==
- Weather of 2023
- 2023 Haiti floods
