= Cayes-Jacmel =

Cayes-Jacmel Kay Jakmèl
- Commune
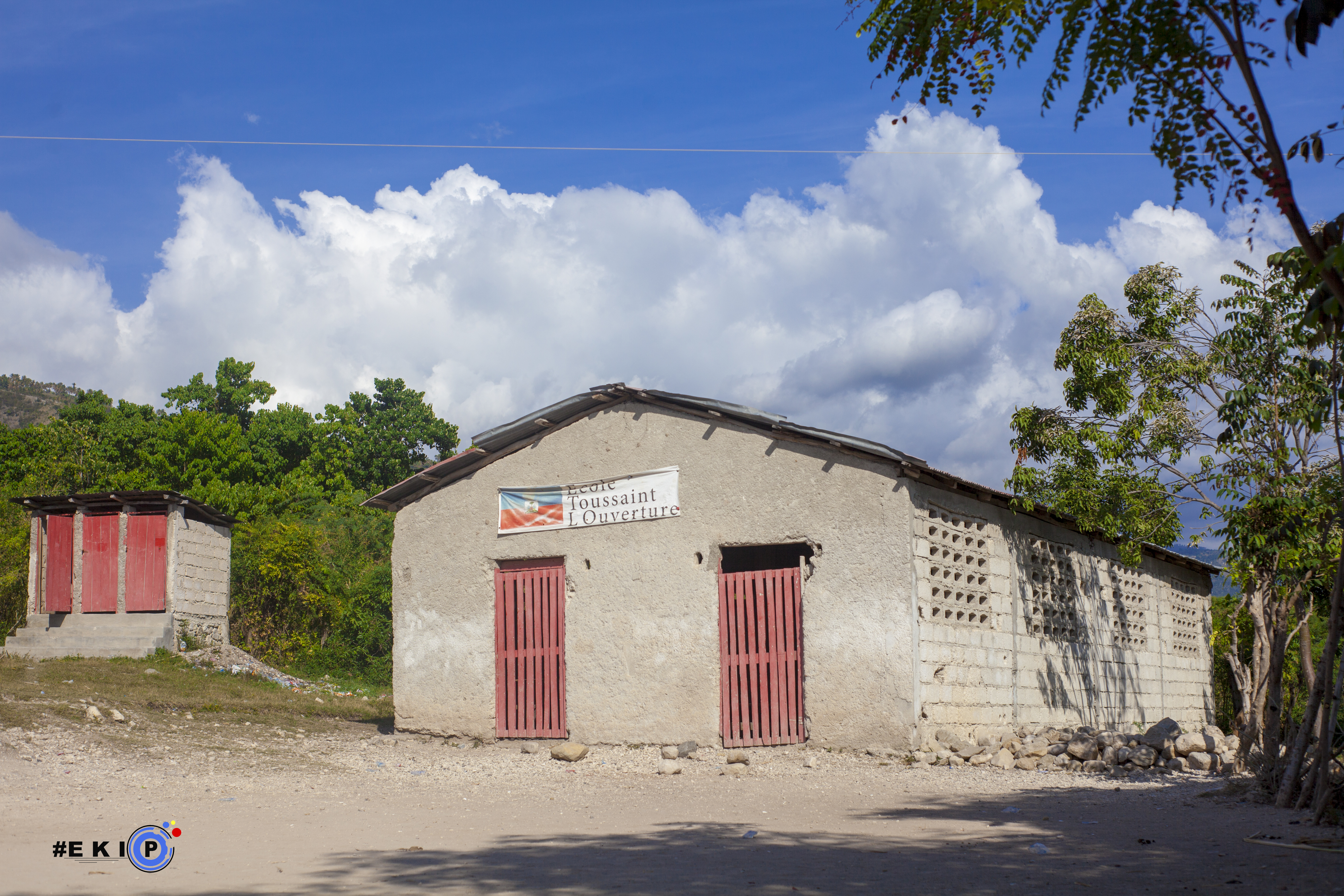
- Interactive map of Cayes-Jacmel
- Location in Haiti
- Coordinates: 18°13′55″N 72°23′45″W
- Country: Haiti
- Department: Sud-Est
- Arrondissement: Jacmel

Area
  - Total: 78.99 km^{2} (30.50 sq mi)
- Elevation: 586 m (1,923 ft)

Population (2015)
  - Total: 40,348
  - Density: 510.8/km^{2} (1,323/sq mi)
- Time zone: UTC−05:00 (EST)
  - Summer (DST): UTC−04:00 (EDT)
- Postal code: HT 9130

Cayes-Jacmel (French pronunciation: [kaj ʒakmɛl]; Haitian Creole: Kay Jakmèl) is a commune in the Jacmel Arrondissement, in the Sud-Est department of Haiti. It has 40,348 inhabitants. Cayes-Jacmel is down the road from Cyvadier and home to a public beach and has a farmers market (Wednesdays and Saturdays). The town is also home to artists and artisans, including work in miniature ships. The region's hydroelectric plant (running on a stream only a few inches deep) is nearby.

== Demographic ==
The commune is inhabited by 40,230 people. (2009 estimate).

== History ==
The town of Cayes-Jacmel was founded in 1714.

== Administration ==
The commune is made up of 4 sections:

- Ravine-Normande
- Gaillard
- Haut-Cap-Rouge
- La Selle de Fond-Melon

== Monument and site ==
Fort Ogé is part of around 20 military installments, built on the Haitian territory after the 1804 independence: a defensive system aimed to stop a possible return of the French, former owners of the Saint-Domingue colony. The Fort Ogé was built under the direction of general Magloire Ambroise. The ruins of the fort are located inside the commune section of Cap-Rouge. Its name reminds of Vincent Ogé, one of the main protagonists of the Haitian Revolution.

== See also ==
- Jean Bellande Joseph Foundation
