= Jacmel Film Festival =

Haitian film festival

Coordinates: 18.235°N 72.536°W

- Location: Jacmel, Haiti
- Founded: 2004
- Language: International
- Website: http://www.festivalfilmjakmel.com/

The Jacmel Film Festival (French: Festival du film de Jacmel) is a Haitian festival celebrated in the seaside city of Jacmel, Haiti. It is an annual ceremony celebrating contemporary world cinema and at the same time, entertaining the masses and providing cultural insight through film. Local Haitian cinema is awarded alongside other films as well. The festival is attended by approximately 50,000 people each year.

The festival was founded by David Belle, an American filmmaker living in Haiti and Patrick Boucard a Haitian artist and founder of a cultural organization in Jacmel. The festival is very recent being staged for the first time in 2004. It has been held annually since. Many internationally renowned directors attend annually from over 30 countries such as Spain, Cuba, the United States, France, and Canada. Many aspiring Haitian student filmmakers attend as a source of knowledge as well as inspiration.
