= Belle-Anse Arrondissement =

Coordinates: 18.2331°N 72.0669°W

Belle-Anse Arrondissement Arrondissement de Belle-Anse Awondisman Bèlans
- Arrondissement
- Interactive map of Belle-Anse Arrondissement
- Country: Haiti
- Department: Sud-Est

Area
  - Arrondissement: 776.70 km^{2} (299.89 sq mi)
  - Urban: 9.26 km^{2} (3.58 sq mi)
  - Rural: 767.44 km^{2} (296.31 sq mi)

Population (2015)
  - Arrondissement: 158,081
  - Density: 203.53/km^{2} (527.14/sq mi)
  - Urban: 27,770
  - Rural: 130,311
- Time zone: UTC-5 (Eastern)
- Postal codes: HT93—
- Communes: 4
- Communal Sections: 12
- IHSI Code: 023

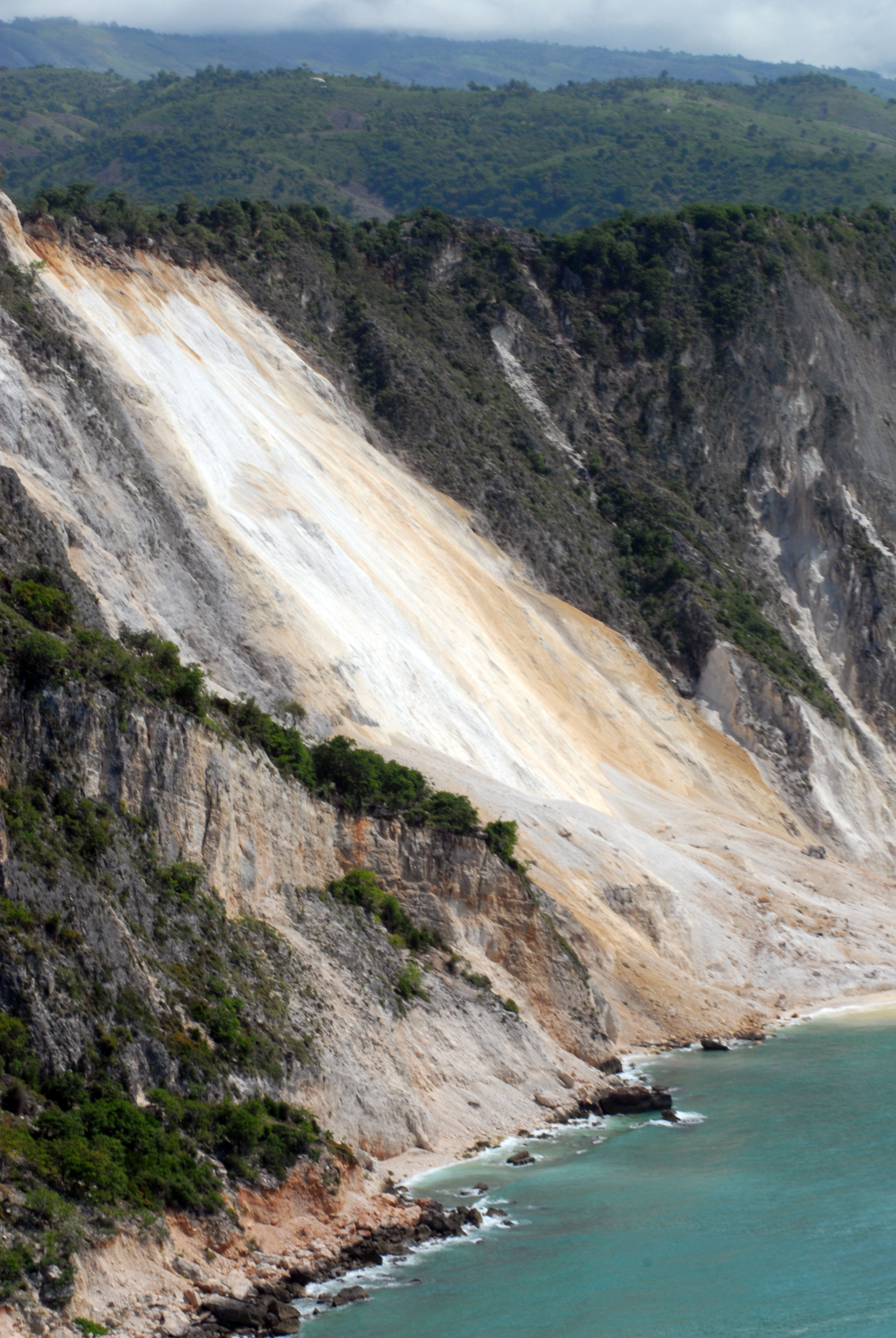
A landslide caused by Hurricane Ike in Belle-Anse, Haiti

Belle-Anse (Haitian Creole: Bèlans) is an arrondissement in the Sud-Est department of Haiti. As of 2015, the population was 158,081 inhabitants. Postal codes in the Belle-Anse Arrondissement start with the number 93.

The arrondissement consists of the following communes:

- Belle-Anse
- Anse-à-Pitres
- Grand-Gosier
- Thiotte
