= Marigot, Haiti =

Marigot Marigo
- Commune
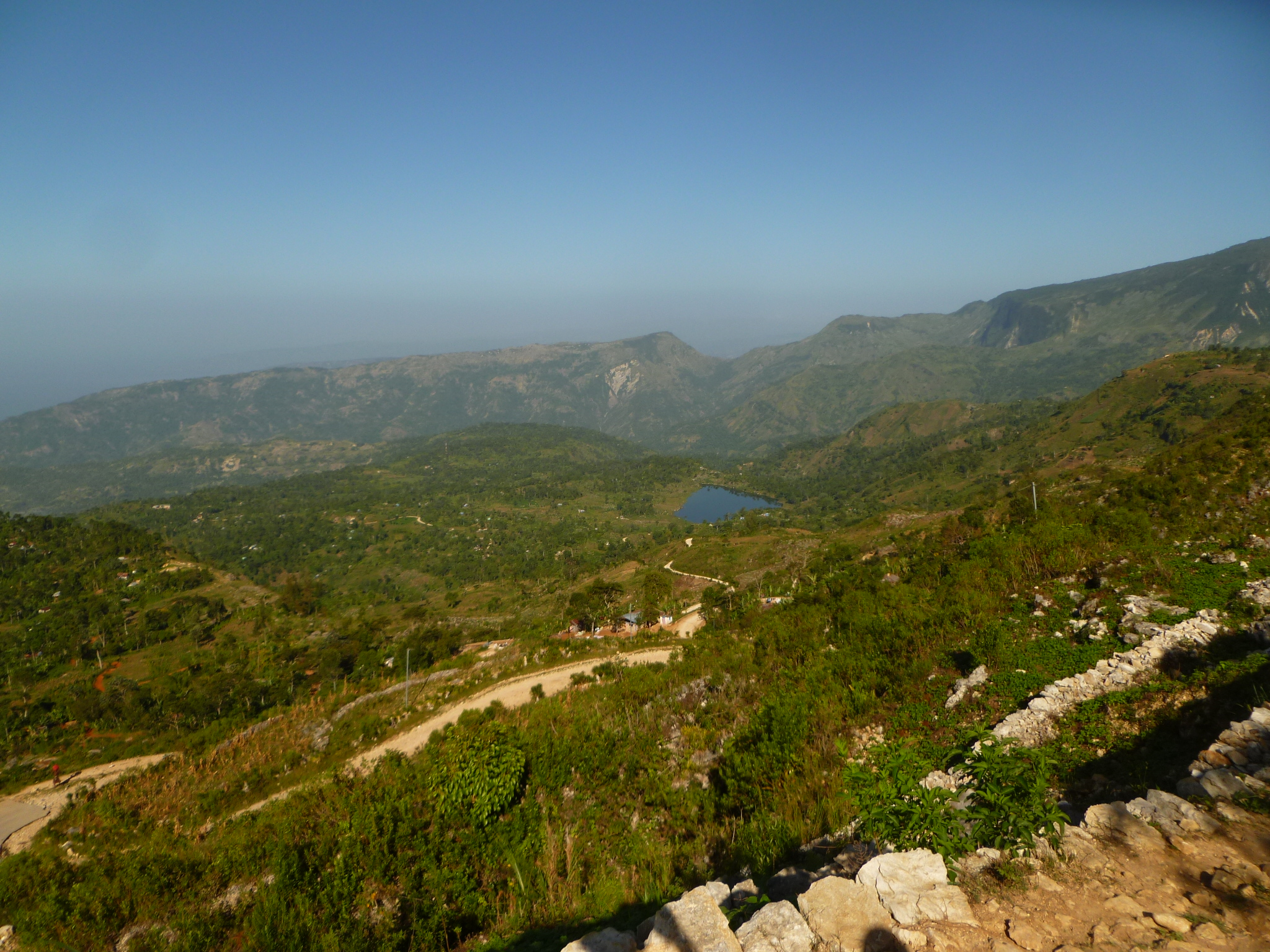
- Interactive map of Marigot
- Location in Haiti
- Coordinates: 18°14′0″N 72°19′0″W
- Country: Haiti
- Department: Sud-Est
- Arrondissement: Jacmel

Area
  - Total: 187.11 km^{2} (72.24 sq mi)
- Elevation: 41 m (135 ft)

Population (2015)
  - Total: 74,700
  - Density: 399/km^{2} (1,030/sq mi)
- Time zone: UTC−05:00 (EST)
  - Summer (DST): UTC−04:00 (EDT)
- Postal code: HT 9120

Marigot (French pronunciation: [maʁiɡo]; Haitian Creole: Marigo) is a commune in the Jacmel Arrondissement, in the Sud-Est department of Haiti. It has 50,739 inhabitants.

In early 1793, during the Haitian Revolution, Marigot's black inhabitants rebelled and built a fort in the city. Abbé Aubert, a white priest and leader of the rebellion in the area, also commandeered Marigot's cannons and contributed them to Romaine-la-Prophétesse's slave uprising around and siege of Jacmel.

The Haitian writer Émile Célestin-Mégie was born in Marigot.
