= Roger Dorsinville =

Haitian poet, journalist and diplomat

Roger Dorsinville (March 11, 1911 - January 12, 1992) was a Haitian poet, journalist, novelist, politician, and diplomat.

Born in Port-au-Prince, Dorsinville attended military school before serving as the Minister of Public Health and ambassador to Brazil, Costa Rica, Venezuela and Senegal.

Some of his most notable works are Barrières (1946), Pour Célébrer la Terre (1954), Le Grand Devoir (1962), and Toussaint Louverture (1965).

== Selected works ==
=== Novels ===
- Kimby, ou, La loi de Niang, 1973
- L'Afrique des rois, 1975
- Un Homme en trois morceaux, 1975
- Mourir pour Haïti, ou, Les croisés d'Esther, 1980
- Renaître à Dendé, 1980.
- De Fatras Bâton à Toussaint Louverture, 1983
- Marche arrière (Mémoires), 1986
- Accords perdus, 1987
- Ils ont tué le vieux blanc, 1988
- Une Haïtienne à New York, 1991
- Les Vèvès du Créateur, 1989
- Rites de passage (complete works, 11 volumes), 1990
- Marche arrière II (Mémoires), 1991
