= Thiotte =

Thiotte Tyòt
- Commune
- Interactive map of Thiotte
- Location in Haiti
- Coordinates: 18°15′0″N 71°51′0″W
- Country: Haiti
- Department: Sud-Est
- Arrondissement: Belle-Anse

Area
  - Total: 126.33 km^{2} (48.78 sq mi)
- Elevation: 956 m (3,136 ft)

Population (2015)
  - Total: 34,925
  - Density: 276.46/km^{2} (716.02/sq mi)
- Time zone: UTC−05:00 (EST)
  - Summer (DST): UTC−04:00 (EDT)
- Postal code: HT 9330

Thiotte (French pronunciation: [tjɔt]; Haitian Creole: Tyòt) is a commune in the Belle-Anse Arrondissement, in the Sud-Est department of Haiti. It has 23,041 inhabitants.
