= Jacmel =

Jacmel Jakmèl (Haitian Creole) Yaquimel (Arawakan Name)
- Commune
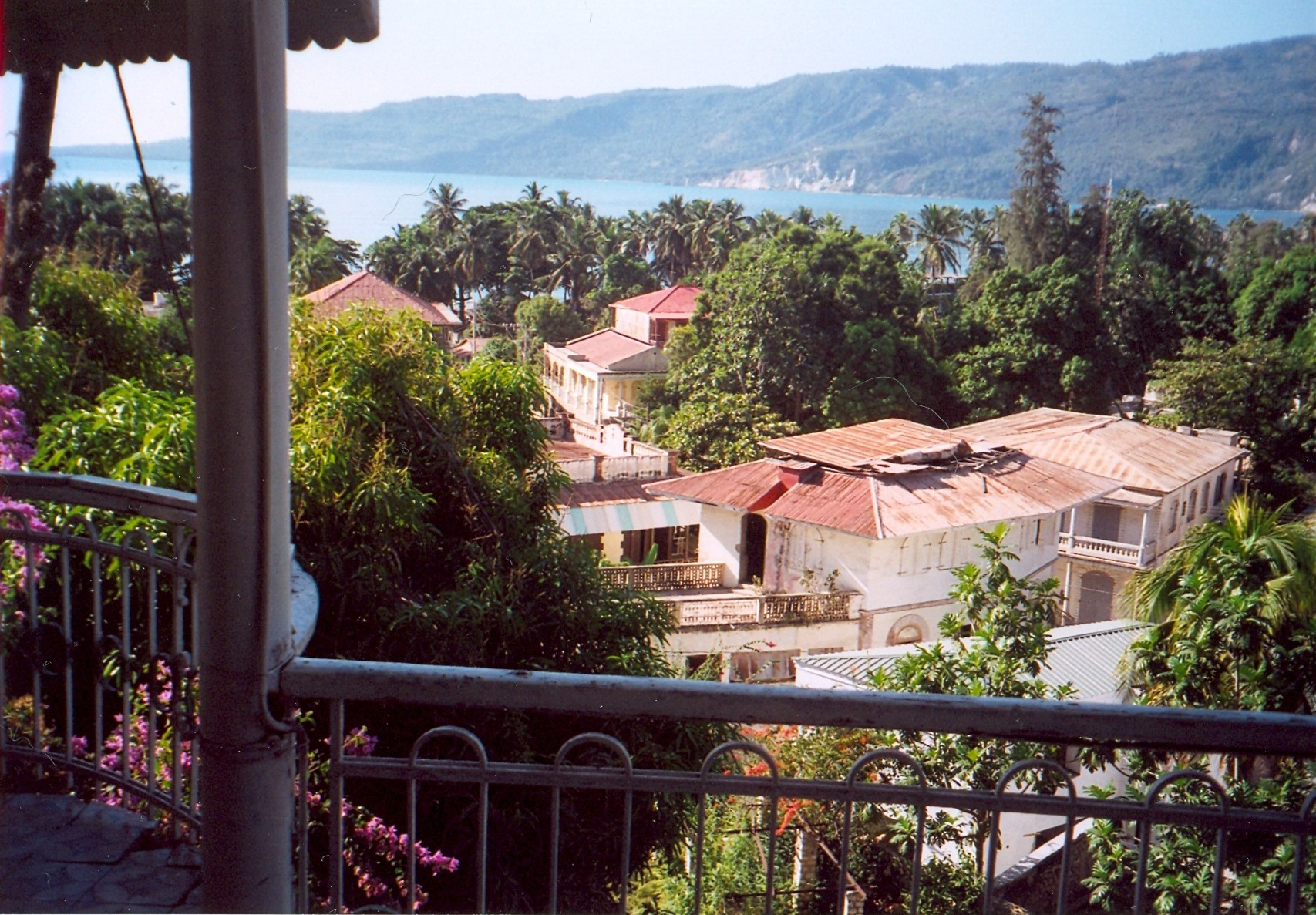
- Nicknames: Culture Capital, City of Artists
- Motto: Sursum Corda
- Interactive map of Jacmel
- Location in Haiti
- Coordinates: 18°14′7″N 72°32′12″W
- Country: Haiti
- Department: Sud-Est
- Commune: Jacmel
- Demonym: Jacmelien(ne)
- Founded by Spain: 1504
- French settlement: 1698
- Founder: Nicolás de Ovando

Government
  - Mayor: Marky Kessa

Area
  - Total: 443.88 km^{2} (171.38 sq mi)
- Elevation: 43 m (141 ft)

Population (2024)
  - Total: 221,965
  - Density: 500.06/km^{2} (1,295.1/sq mi)
- Time zone: UTC-5 (Eastern)
  - Summer (DST): UTC-4 (Eastern)
- Postal code: HT 9110

Jacmel (French pronunciation: [ʒakmɛl]; Haitian Creole: Jakmèl) is a commune in southern Haiti previously founded by the Spanish in 1504 before the relocation of the Dominicans to the eastern side of the island after the Devastations of Osorio and repopulated by the French in 1698. It is the capital of the department of Sud-Est, 24 miles (39 km) southwest of Port-au-Prince across the Tiburon Peninsula, and had a population of 221,965 at the 2024 Census. The town's name is derived from its indigenous Taíno name of Yaquimel. In 1925, Jacmel was dubbed as the "City of Light," becoming the first in the Caribbean to have electricity.

The city is known for its well-preserved Gingerbread houses built in the early 19th century. The town has been tentatively accepted as a World Heritage Site. It sustained damage in the 2010 Haiti earthquake.

Jacmel is home to the country's leading film school, the Ciné Institute.

== History ==
The town was founded by the Compagnie de Saint-Domingue in 1698 as the capital of the southeastern part of the French colony Saint-Domingue. The area now called Jacmel was Taíno territory, part of the Xaragua chiefdom ruled by cacique Bohechio and founded by Spain prior to the arrival of France and their slaves. With the arrival of the French, and the later establishment of the town, the French renamed Yaquimel as Jacmel.

The city was developed to boost sugar production and trade, but soon it evolved into a coffee trading centre. In 1896 it suffered a major fire that destroyed most of the buildings in the city. The city was rebuilt, often using prefabricated cast-iron pillars and balconies shipped from France. Many ornate mansions of wealthy coffee merchants from this time have been preserved up to this day without much change and the whole central part of the city has changed little over the last 100 years.

The mansions of Jacmel, with their cast-iron pillars and balconies, would later influence the homes in much of New Orleans. Today, many of these homes are now artisan shops that sell vibrant handicrafts, papier-mâché masks, and carved-wood animal figures. In recent years, efforts have been made to revitalize the once flourishing cigar and coffee industries. The town is a popular tourist destination in Haiti due to its relative tranquility and distance from the political turmoil that plagues Port-au-Prince.

Over the years, this rather small town experienced a number of noted historical events. Some of these occurrences are:

=== Haitian Revolution and War of the South ===
In 1791 and 1792, Romaine-la-Prophétesse led thirteen thousand rebels in besieging, occupying, and later burning Jacmel, and taking weapons and supplies from (and then burning) surrounding plantations from Marigot, about 25 kilometers east of Jacmel, to Bainet, about 45 kilometers west of it, freeing their slaves.

Toussaint Louverture fought over Jacmel in the War of the South between him and his fellow countryman André Rigaud, who wished to maintain authority over the city. This war began in June 1799. By November the rebels were pushed back to this strategic southern port, the defence of which was commanded by Alexandre Pétion. Jacmel fell to Toussaint's troops in February 1800. Pétion and other mulatto leaders subsequently went into exile in France.

=== Creation of the Gran Colombia flag ===
A Venezuelan predecessor of Simón Bolívar in the liberation struggle against colonialism in Venezuelan and much of Spanish-ruled South America, Francisco de Miranda created the first flag of Gran Colombia near Jacmel, which served as the national flag of the First Republic of Venezuela. Anchored in the Bay of Jacmel (Baie de Jacmel), he first raised the flag on March 12, 1806, on the corvette Leander. This day is still celebrated as Venezuelan Flag Day. The general design of the Gran Colombian flag served as the model for the current flags of Venezuela, Colombia and Ecuador, which emerged as independent nations at the breakup of Gran Colombia in 1830. This flag is often referred to as the "bandera madre" (mother flag) due to its role as inspiration and resemblance to the flags of Colombia and Ecuador.

=== Ramón Emeterio Betances ===
Puerto Rican pro-independence leader Ramón Emeterio Betances spent a short interval in Jacmel in 1870, from where he gathered support for an uprising in the Dominican Republic, seeking to install a liberal government there. Then-president of Haiti, Nissage Saget supported Betances's ideals of a pan-Antillean union and gave the uprising his support.

=== Modern Jacmel prior to the 12 January 2010 earthquake ===
The port town is internationally known for its very vibrant art scene and elegant townhouses dating from the 19th century. Among the wealth of art and crafts available in Jacmel are the papier-mâché, done by nearly 200 artisans and the renowned Atelier created by Moro Baruk. In recent years Jacmel has been host to a large film festival, called the Jacmel Film Festival, that started in 2004, and in 2007 the international Jacmel Music Festival was successfully launched as well. Its carnival, the nearby Bassin Bleu (Haiti's most famous natural deep pools), and the scenic white sand (Timouillage, Cabic, Raymond-les-bains, located primarily in Cayes-Jacmel) beaches attract many visitors. The town is regarded as one of the safest in the country, and foreign visitors that come to Haiti seeking tranquility often go for Jacmel. Its urbanization has been increasing in large part due to the income generated by tourism. Royal Caribbean, the leading tourism company whose cruise ships regularly dock at Labadee, plans to add stopovers at Jacmel. In February 2007, Edwin Zenny became the town's newly elected mayor. The current mayor is Marky Kessa. In addition, the Jacmel Film Festival is held there annually. On January 11, 2010, Choice Hotels announced they would open a 120-room Comfort Inn in Jacmel, the first chain hotel to be opened there in a decade.

=== 2010 Haiti earthquake ===
On 12 January 2010, Haiti experienced a magnitude 7.0 earthquake that caused heavy damage and casualties in Jacmel. The first tremor rocked the city at 4:40 pm, but the later tremor at 5:37 pm stopped the cathedral's clock. A Jacmel radio station estimated that at least 5000 were dead from the quake itself, although mayor Edwin 'Edo' Zenny in later reported that the figure was closer to 300–500 deaths and 4,000 injured. About 70 per cent of the homes were damaged, with most of the heavier damage being in the poorer neighbourhoods. The town hall was so severely damaged that it had to be demolished. A small tsunami hit Jacmel Bay, with the ocean receding, leaving fish high and dry on the seabed, and rushing back in, four times.

==== Recovery ====
In December 2010, the Capponi Construction Group, a Miami-based construction company, decided to help with the revitalization of Jacmel. This initiative was created to help stimulate a self-sustaining tourism economy for Haiti. Michael Capponi, founder of the Capponi Group, formed the Jacmel Advisory Council to help revitalize Jacmel, while preserving its arts, culture and traditions. The board promotes best practices to provide a socio-economic system for thousands of Haitians living in the southeast region. Capponi Group Haiti is also restoring a 200-year-old coffee-sorting house at the port of Jacmel. The project hopes to again make Jacmel a commercial and tourist center.

== Jacmel carnival ==
The city of Jacmel is famous for its carnival which is a month long celebration culminating the week before the national Haitian carnival. The carnival of Jacmel is notable for particular costumes and masks which blends everything from Haitian folklore legends and historical figures from the country's past to sports celebrities and political caricatures.

== Notable residents ==
- René Depestre, a famous Haitian poet and essayist who fled from the Duvalier dictatorship. He was born in Jacmel. The city is the setting for much of his fictional work.
- Préfète Duffaut, painter
- Michaëlle Jean, Secretary-General of La Francophonie and former Governor General of Canada, was born in Port-au-Prince to a Jacmel family.
- Magloire Ambroise, hero of the struggle for independence
- Jørgen Leth, Danish filmmaker, writer and former Danish honorary consul in Haiti.
- Alexandre Grégoire, painter who typically depicted scenes of Vodou, daily life, and historical events in the naïve style.
- Roussan Camille, poet, journalist, and diplomat
- Charles Moravia, poet, dramatist, teacher, and diplomat
- Laënnec Hurbon, sociologist, Catholic theologian, and ex-priest
- Lucien Lemoine, Haitian-Senegalese stage director, actor, poet, and radio host

== Facilities ==
The Port of Jacmel (HTJAK) is a small, relatively shallow port and is unable to harbour large ships. There is also a pleasurecraft dock as part of the port, which survived the quake. It is run by the Autorité Portuaire Nationale.

Also located in Jacmel is a small airstrip (MTJA) capable of handling small to medium-sized planes. The airstrip is unable to handle large aircraft.

Jacmel has two hospitals, Hôpital Saint-Michel and the "Complexe Médico Chirurgical Rose Marie Paul" recently founded by the philanthropist Dr. Leon Paul, and becomes the highest equipped surgery center in the city, with highly qualified international and national professionals. The "Hôpital Saint-Michel" which locals had nicknamed "the morgue" prior to the earthquake. The hospital is the largest hospital or health centre in the region. It has a staff of six doctors and ten nurses. The quake half-collapsed the hospital, including the maternity ward; however, the hospital continues to operate. The radiology department was the only undamaged portion of the hospital.

Jacmel had a civil court building, which was destroyed in the 2010 earthquake.

The town's main square is Place Toussaint Louverture, named after the Haitian revolutionary leader.

== Sister cities ==
- Gainesville, Florida, United States

Jacmel has cooperative agreements with:

- Strasbourg, France since 1996 (Coopération décentralisée)
