= Sud-Est (department) =

Department of Haiti

Coordinates: 18.2333°N 72.5333°W

Sud-Est Sidès
- Department
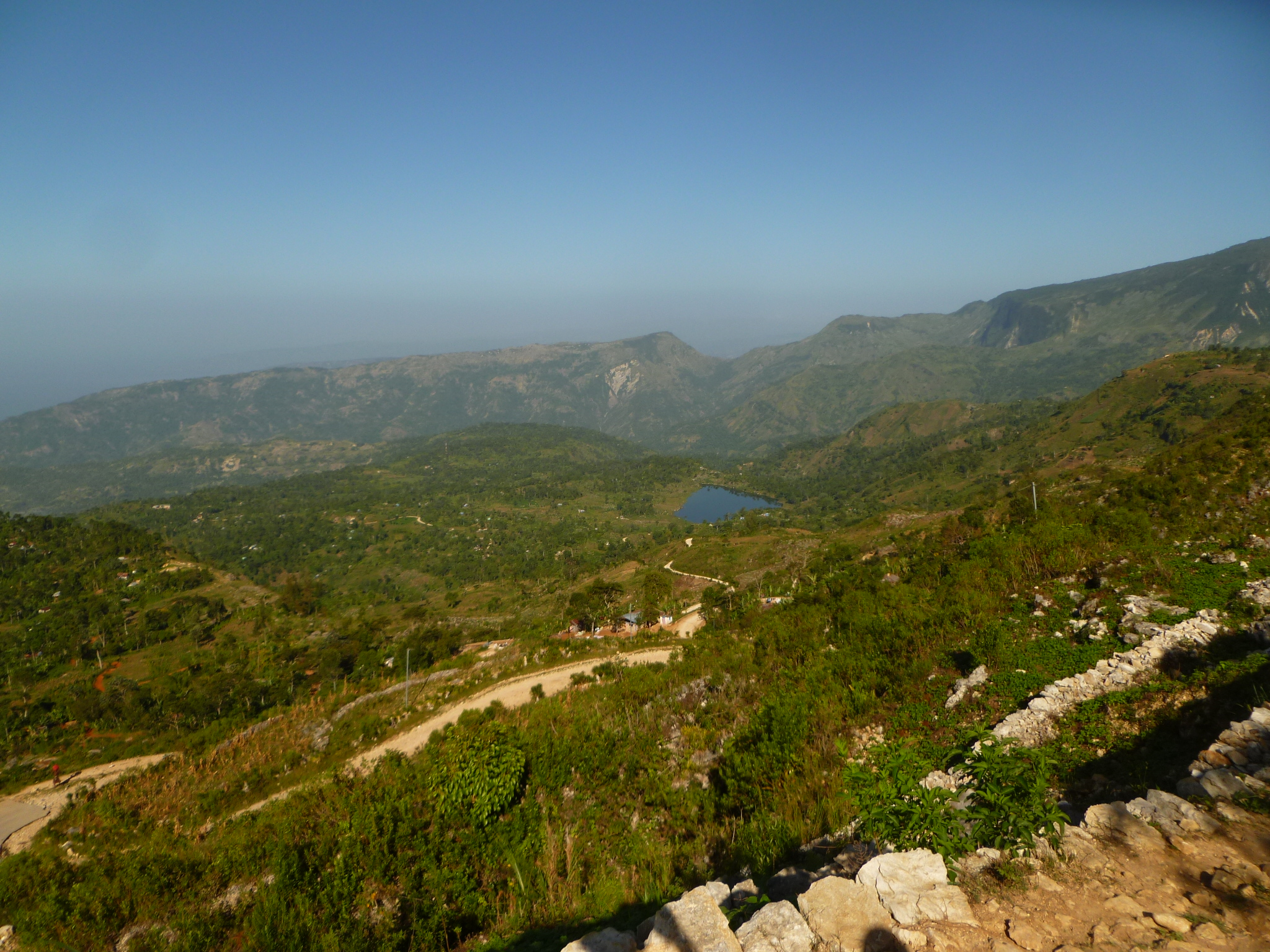
- Marigot

- Sud-Est in Haiti
- Country: Haiti
- Capital: Jacmel
- Région: Tiburon Peninsula
- Symbole: Peacock enclosed in a tower-wall

Government
  - Type: Departmental Council

Area
  - Department: 2,034.10 km^{2} (785.37 sq mi)

Population (2015)
  - Department: 632,601
  - Density: 310.998/km^{2} (805.481/sq mi)
  - Urban: 96,454
  - Rural: 536,147
- Time zone: UTC-05:00 (EST)
  - Summer (DST): UTC-04:00 (EDT)
- ISO 3166 code: HT-SE
- HDI (2017): 0.467 low · 8th

Sud-Est (French, pronounced [sydɛst]) or Sidès (Haitian Creole; both meaning "South East") is one of the ten departments of Haiti located in southern Haiti. It has an area of 2,034.10 km^{2} and a population of 632,601 (2015). Its capital is Jacmel.

== History ==
=== Taino Period ===
The department is part of the Xaragua kasika under the leadership of Bohecio and Anacaona. The settlement of Yakimèl was in the area of actual Jacmel City.

=== Spanish Period ===
Jacmel is one of the earliest Spanish towns in the Caribbean when it was settled by Nicolas Ovando in 1504.

=== French Period ===
One year after the Treaty of Ryswick, the French formally settle the city through La Compagnie de St-Domingue.

=== Haitian Period ===
==== Haitian Revolution ====
Like many of the actual departments in Haiti, by 1791, the different social classes of St-Domingue started rebelling against the status quo. The enslaved under the leadership of Romaine-La-Prophétesse, a mulatto coffee plantation owner, asked for the abolition of slavery and liberty for all. The mixed race under the leadership of André Rigaud asked for equal rights with the whites. These revendications reach their heights in the Pre-Independence Civil War opposing Toussaint's northern troops with lieutenants like Dessalines and Rigaud's southern troops with lieutenants like Pétion.

==== Independence ====
On September, 17th 1803, Magloire Ambroise, helped by Cangé and Yayou's troops freed Jacmel from the French troops under the leadership of Pageot.

Magloire Ambroise, commander of Jacmel is a signatory of the Act of Independence on 1 January. During the Haitian-Civil war opposing King Henry 1st and President Pétion, the South-East was part of the republic. During that period the Jacmel received the South American Liberator Simon Bolivar, providing him shelter, merchandise, guns, and soldiers. The Grand-Colombia flag was designed in Jacmel based on the Haitian republican flag.

=== Modern Period ===
The department knew a great financial time at the beginning of the 20th century with the exportation of coffee, resulting in Jacmel's unique architecture and culture. The capital city was the first to have electricity and a telephone line in the Caribbean.

== Geography ==
The South-East is bordered in the north by the West Department, on the west, by the South Department, the south by the Caribbean Sea and on the east by the province of Pedernales province. The Bay of Jacmel is the biggest bay of the department, followed by the Bay of Bainet (meaning clear bay). The most important rivers are the Jacmel river and the Bainet river. The coastal plain of the department allows a possible expansion of the capital. The department has one of the longest coastal lines in the country.

=== 2010 earthquake ===
Like the whole Xaragua Peninsula the department is on the fault line of Plantain-Garden-Enriquillo resulting in many earthquakes in the department's history. Jacmel in Jacmel Arrondissement, a city with many Haitian colonial heritage buildings, was devastated by a 7.0 magnitude tremblor on 12 January 2010, collapsing much of that heritage architecture. Since then many of the buildings have been rebuilt.

== Environment ==
The S-E shares the La Visite National Park with the West. Around Belle-Anse the S-E harbors the Three Lagoons National Park.

== Economy ==
With a sizable port like Jacmel and direct access to the Dominican Republic, the S-E has great potential for economic development, especially in tourism and arts.

=== Tourism and Arts ===
Jacmel, Marigot, and Belle-Anse have the capacity to receive tourists. Raymond-des-Bains is a famous beach in the department.

Jacmel has a notable carnival activity in the Caribbean region, and one of its characters (the robalagallina, imitation or caricature of the planter's wife) has been adopted by the carnival of the Dominican Republic. The festive behavior of the Jacmelians earned them international fame.

During the Easter celebrations, a great parade of rara bands under the rhythms of petro and congo, is organized there. The civil authorities organize it in order to promote Haitian culture which is closely linked to that of West/Central Africa.

Jacmel is also known for its manifestations of the patronal feast on the first of May each year. It is the feast of the patron saint of the city, Saint Jacques and Saint Philippe. During this festival, the musical groups of Haiti meet in Jacmel and its surroundings for concerts which are called in Haitian Creole "ball". On 18 May, the Jacmeliens celebrate their flag with large parades of brass bands throughout the city. In November Jacmel perpetuates the traditional "Feast of the Dead" (1 and 2 November).

Jacmel also hosts a Francophone film festival in 201912,13, and a festival dedicated to jazz.

=== Mining ===
The S-E has great potential for mining notably for iridium in the area of Belot.

== Transport ==
The RN4 connects the department to the West and Léogane. RD402 connects to Anse-à-Pitres RD401 connects to Cote-de-Fer.

== Administrative divisions ==
The Department of Sud-Est is subdivided into three arrondissements, which are further subdivided into ten communes.

- Bainet Arrondissement
  - Bainet
  - Côtes-de-Fer
- Belle-Anse Arrondissement
  - Belle-Anse
  - Anse-à-Pitres
  - Grand-Gosier
  - Thiotte
- Jacmel Arrondissement
  - Jacmel
  - Cayes-Jacmel
  - La Vallée
  - Marigot

There are fifteen other smaller towns or villages, including: Banane, Bourcan-Bélier, Cavalier, Coutelas, Forêt-des-Pins, La Fond, La Vallée, Mare Rouge, Mayette, Mombin, Platon-Besace, Saint Antoine, Savane-Zombi, and Seguin.
