= Haitian conflict =

Civil conflict over control of Port-au-Prince

- Part of the Haitian crisis (2018–present)
- Clashes as of July 2026 Areas of anti-government and gang activity
Date	23 May 2020 – present (6 years, 5 months, 4 weeks and 2 days)
Location	Haiti (spillover to Turks and Caicos Islands)
Status	Ongoing; Assassination of president Jovenel Moïse in 2021 by foreign mercenary commandos; 2022 blockade of Varreux fuel terminal; UN-backed Gang Suppression Force (GSF) (previously known as MSS) deployed since 2024; Ariel Henry resigns as acting prime minister on 24 April 2024; Garry Conille installed as acting prime minister of Haiti on 3 June 2024; Garry Conille removed and replaced by Alix Didier Fils-Aimé on 10 November 2024; Crisis in the Gulf of Gonâve; Viv Ansanm builds quasi-state and government structures; Full withdrawal of Kenyan police contingents, to be replaced by police and military forces from Bangladesh, Chad and Sri Lanka; 2026 Salvadoran intervention due to kidnapping in Croix-des-Bouquets
Territorial changes	Territory of Viv Ansanm: 90% of the capital Port-au-Prince and other communes in Ouest; 50% of the Artibonite region; Mirebalais, Saut-d'Eau and other parts of Centre

Belligerents
Anti-government forces (gangs): Viv Ansanm; G9; Delmas 6; Baz Pilate; Baz Krache Dife; Baz Nan Chabon (Waf Jérémie); Nan Boston; Simon Pelé; Pierre VI; Belekou; Ti Bwa; G-Pèp; 400 Mawozo; Nan Brooklyn; Gran Grif; Chen Mechan; Kraze Baryè; 5 Segond; Gran Ravine; Taliban (Canaan); Mariani; Nan Ti Bwa; Terre Noire; Kokorat Sans Ras; Other groups	Local self-defense forces: Protesters, self-defense groups, and other armed factions; Bwa kale vigilantes; Brigade for the Security of Protected Areas (until 2026); La Coalition; Force Résistance Chandelle	Government of Haiti and Allies; Haitian security forces; Haitian National Police; Armed Forces of Haiti; El Salvador; Salvadoran Army (2026-present); Salvadoran Air Force (2026-present); GSF (current version) / MSS (previous version); Bangladesh (2026-present); Bangladesh Army; Chad (2026-present); Chadian National Army; Sri Lanka (2026-present); Sri Lankan Army; Sri Lanka Police: Special Task Force; El Salvador (2025-present); Salvadoran Air Force; Guatemala (2025-present); Guatemalan Army; Jamaica (2024-present); JDF; JCF; Kenya (2024-2026); Kenya Police; Bahamas (2024-2026); RBDF; Belize (2024-2025); BDF; United States; Marine Corps (for the security of the US Embassy); Private security company: Vectus Global; Task Force

Commanders and leaders
Jimmy Chérizier; Gilbert Bigio #; Ti Greg †; Gabriel Jean-Pierre; Vitel'Homme Innocent; Wilson Joseph "Lanmò San Jou"; Johnson “Izo” André; Prophane Victor; Luckson Élan; Monel "Mikano" Felix; Joly Germine (POW); Jermaine Stephenson; Mathias Saintil †	Guy Philippe; Jeantel Joseph	Jovenel Moïse X Ariel Henry; Michel Boisvert; Garry Conille; Alix Fils-Aimé; National Police: Léon Charles; Frantz Elbé; Rameau Normil; Vladimir Paraison (WIA); Armed Forces: Jodel Lesage; Derby Guerrier; El Salvador: Nayib Bukele; José Roberto Figueroa; MSS/GSF: Godfrey Otunge; Kevron Henry; Eldon Morgan; Elon Clarke; Erdenebat Batsuuri; Private security contractors: Erik Prince

Strength
~ 12,000 to 20,000 members (2026)	Bwa Kale: unknown ~6,000 BSAP members	Government of Haiti: ~13,500 police officers ~1,500 soldiers Government of El Salvador (currently active): 2,500 troops GSF / MSS (currently active): (Bangladesh) 50 troops (to be increased) (Chad) 400 troops (to be increased) (Sri Lanka) 1,089 troops (to be increased) (El Salvador) 78 air force members (including pilots and technicians), two Bell UH-1N helicopters (Guatemala) 150 security personnel (Jamaica) 24 (20 army troops and 4 police officers) Private military company (currently active): Vectus Global: almost 200 troops including drone operators GSF / MSS (mission end): (Kenya) 740 police members (Belize) 2 military officers
- See Gang Suppression Force § Personnel for further details

Casualties and losses
Unknown but heavy The house of Lanmò San Jou and the headquarters of the 400 Mawozo gang have been destroyed.	Unknown	(Haiti) 153+ Haitian policemen killed, 20 Haitian soldiers killed (Kenya) 4 Kenyan policemen killed (1 non-combat) (El Salvador) 3 soldiers killed (non-combat), 4 aviation technicians missing in action
- 26,300+ killed (Note: By mid-2022, about 1,100 people had been killed in the gang war. In late 2023, the United Nations estimated that an additional 2,439 people had been killed from January to August 2023. Between 2020 and 2023 10,000 people were killed, in 2024 5,600 people were killed due to the war, between January and December 2025 6,000+ people were killed by gang violence, at least 85 civilians killed due to collateral damage from drone strikes linked to Vectus Global. At least 4,700 people killed in the war between january and october 2026.) (click a for details); 5,500+ reported kidnappings 1.5 million people displaced (DW estimate); 5,636 in starvation and other 5.7 million people at Category 4 "crisis" levels of food insecurity (UN estimate); 1,200+ deaths due to cholera outbreak (WHO estimate)

Since 2020, Haiti's capital Port-au-Prince has been the site of an ongoing armed conflict between rival gangs and the state. The government of Haiti and national security forces have struggled to maintain their control of Port-au-Prince amid this conflict, with gangs speculated to control up to 90% of the city by 2023. In response to the escalating fighting, an armed vigilante movement, known as bwa kale, also emerged, with the purpose of fighting the gangs. On 2 October 2023, United Nations Security Council Resolution 2699 was approved, authorizing a Kenya-led "multinational security support mission" to Haiti. Until 2024, the war was between two major groups and their allies: the Revolutionary Forces of the G9 Family and Allies (FRG9 or G9) and the G-Pèp. However, in February 2024 the two rival groups united in a coalition known as Viv Ansanm, formed to oppose the government and the UN mission.

In March 2024, violence spread throughout Port-au-Prince with the goal of obtaining the resignation of acting prime minister Ariel Henry, leading to the storming of two prisons and the release of thousands of prisoners. These attacks and subsequent attacks on various government institutions led the Haitian government to declare a state of emergency and impose a curfew. Henry ultimately resigned and was replaced by Garry Conille on 3 June 2024, who in turn was replaced with Alix Didier Fils-Aimé in November 2024.

== Background ==
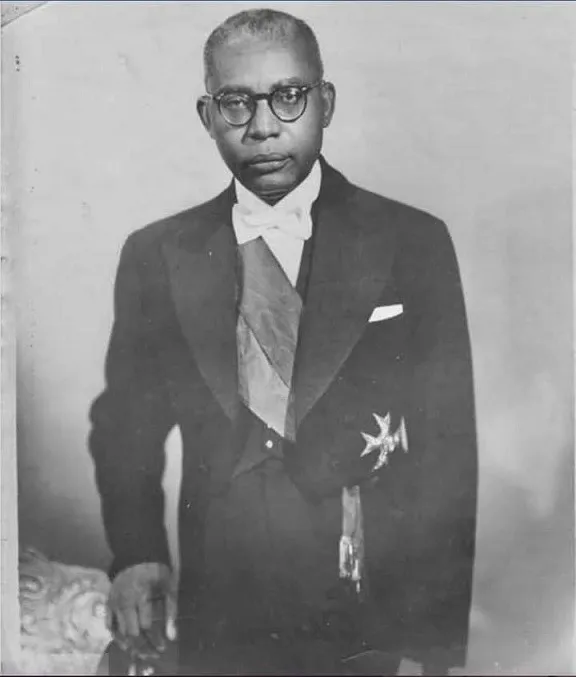
The widespread activity of armed groups in Haiti dates back to the Duvalier dynasty (François Duvalier pictured in 1957)

Since the 1950s, armed groups have been firmly established in Haiti. This process began with the establishment of the Tonton Macoute paramilitaries by the dictatorship led by president François Duvalier, used to violently suppress dissidents. After the dictatorship ended with the removal of President Jean-Claude Duvalier (François' son) from power in 1986, violence continued. The Tonton Macoute were disbanded but never disarmed and thus reorganized as far-right vigilantes. Haitian political actors continued to employ armed groups to defend their interests, manipulate elections and suppress public unrest. In 1994, President Jean-Bertrand Aristide outlawed pro-Duvalier armed groups and disbanded the Haitian Army, but that did not solve the issue, as again there was no disarmament. Thus, ex-soldiers and ex-militiamen further swelled the ranks of unofficial militant factions. From 1994 to 2004, a de facto anti-Arisitide insurgency took place in Port-au-Prince, as ex-soldiers attacked the government. In response to the chaos, youth set up self-defense groups, called chimères, which were supported by the police and the government to shore up its position. Receiving de facto state support from Aristide's Fanmi Lavalas party, the youth gangs took control of entire communes and became increasingly independent-minded. U.S. diplomat Daniel Lewis Foote argued, "Aristide started [the gangs] on purpose in the early 1980s, as a voice, as a way to get some power [for ordinary Haitians], [...] and they morphed over the years."

After the 2010 Haiti earthquake, younger and more ruthless gangs overcame the dominance of older more politically aligned gangs. The armed youth groups grew increasingly powerful. The earthquake also resulted in the mass breakout of criminals from damaged prisons in Haiti. According to Sabine Lamour, the protection of politicians accused of rape and abuse during Michel Martelly's administration (2011–2016) was a mirror of the culture of toxic masculinity and misogyny in the street gangs, whose members embodied the "Legal Bandit" he celebrated in his 2008 album Bandi Légal. The MINUSTAH, a United Nations peacekeeping operation in Haiti started after the end of the 2004 coup d'état, failed to contain the unrest and committed abuses of its own. Since the end of the MINUSTAH in October 2017, there has been an increase in the amount of gang-related violence, as well as an increase in the amount of gang-related violence against civilians, notably the 2018 Port-au-Prince massacre, in which 25 civilians were killed. From 2017 to 2021, Haiti's political leadership became embroiled in a crisis, and the Haitian Parliament entered a deadlock, public administration gradually ceased to operate by a lack of funding, and the judicial system effectively fell apart. Scheduled elections were repeatedly postponed. The economy of Haiti suffered under the repeated natural disasters and the growing unrest, which further contributed to the crisis. Vox journalist Ellen Loanes summarized it as "Haiti has faced serious and compounding crises, including a devastating 2010 earthquake, floods, cholera outbreaks, hurricanes, and corrupt, dictatorial, and incompetent leaders". Gangs stepped into the power vacuum, seizing political power through co-operative politicians and economic control through protection rackets, kidnappings and murders.

== Known gangs and groups ==
From 15 November 2023 to 1 July 2025, Vitel'Homme Innocent, the leader of the Kraze Baryè gang, was among the FBI Ten Most Wanted Fugitives.

By 2022, researchers estimated that about 200 gangs operated across Haiti. Of these, half were located in Port-au-Prince. The more influential gangs control large swathes of territory, including entire municipalities and communes.

- G9 alliance, officially Fòs Revolisyonè G9 an Fanmi e Alye (Revolutionary Forces of the G9 Family and allies): It was founded and is led by Jimmy Chérizier, nicknamed Barbecue, an ex-police officer. G9 is based in the capital's communes of Delmas, Pétion-Ville and parts of Carrefour. The G9 alliance includes many former soldiers and policemen in its ranks and was long connected to the Haitian Tèt Kale Party (PHTK) until distancing itself after Ariel Henry became prime minister. The G9 describes itself as a revolutionary organization and has begun to create a nation-wide alliance network dubbed "G20".
  - Delmas 6 Gang: Personal gang of Chérizier, overall head of G9. The gang was already operating while Chérizier was still an active police officer, signifying the gang's strong links to the Haitian security forces.
  - Baz Pilate: One of the capital's most important gangs, mainly consisting of ex-SWAT elite police.
  - Baz Krache Dife.
  - Nan Ti Bwa.
  - Simon Pelé.
  - Baz Nan Chabon.
  - Waf Jérémie: Responsible for the Wharf Jérémie massacre in 2024, in which 207 people were killed.
  - Nan Boston, also called "Boston gang".
  - Belekou gang.
- G-Pèp: This gang alliance was formed in direct response to G9. It was organized by the Nan Brooklyn gang and its head Jean Pierre Gabriel (alias "Ti Gabriel"). It is centered on Port-au-Prince's Cité Soleil.
  - Nan Brooklyn gang, also called "Brooklyn gang".
  - "400 Mawozo": Formerly the largest gang in Haiti, mainly based in Croix-des-Bouquets, Ganthier and in Port-au-Prince's Tabarre and Pétion-Ville. It has branches in Gros-Morne and the Dominican Republic and has a waiting list for aspiring members. It largely consists of deportees, former leaders of opposition groups, former smugglers and police officers. In 2022, it aligned itself with "G-Pep" after its leader was extradited to the United States from a Haitian prison on gun smuggling charges. It came to international attention with the kidnapping of 17 U.S. missionaries and has also been involved in extortion rackets, road hijackings, smuggling contraband, and the traffic of arms, drugs, and people along the border with the Dominican Republic. It has been weakened in recent times due to clashes with G9 and Les Argentins over their territory.
  - "Bel Air gang": Operates in the neighborhood of Bel Air, a slum of Port-au-Prince. Also known as "Les Argentins".
- "Grand Ravine" and "5 Segond": Two youth gangs based in Port-au-Prince's Martissant; mainly consists of vigilantes and "popular organizations" previously connected to Fanmi Lavalas.
- "Baz Galil": Based outside the capital, it mainly consists of deportees from the United States and is closely connected to the PHTK, various government agencies and other gangs.
- "Titanyen gang": Operates in Cabaret.
- "Baz 5 Segond": Operates in Village de Dieu.
- "Canaan gang": Operates in Cabaret. Also known as Taliban gang.

=== Connection with Jamaican gangs ===
A guns-for-drugs trade was exposed by the Jamaica Gleaner in 2020, where smugglers from Jamaica delivered marijuana to Haiti in exchange for handguns and assault weapons.

== Course of the war ==
=== May 2020 attacks ===
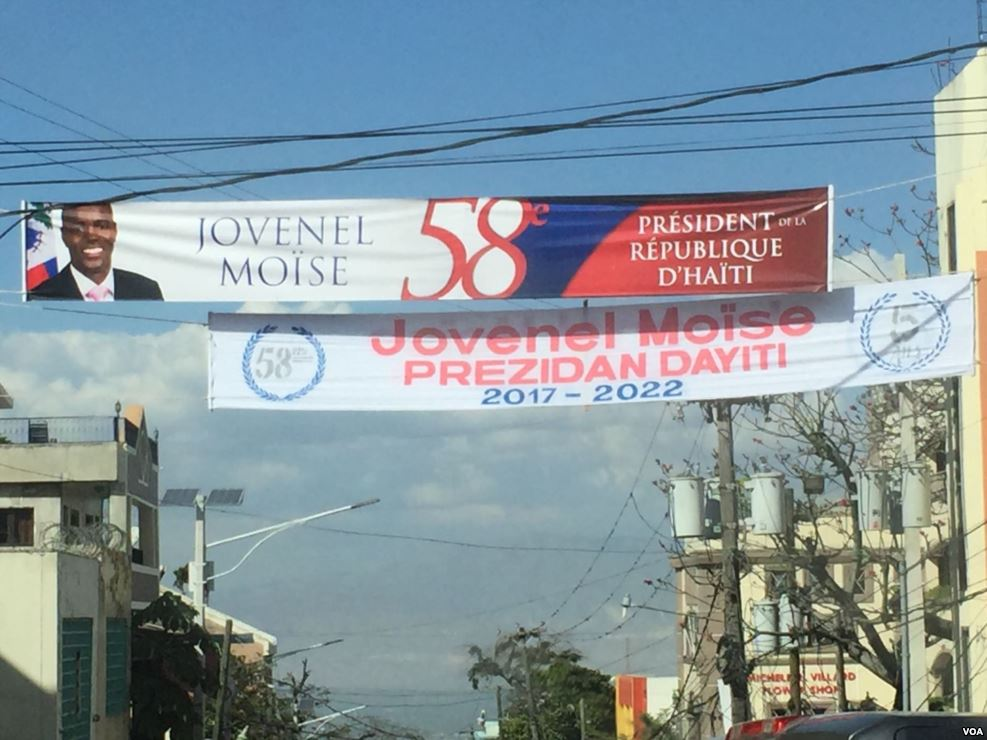
Observers generally believed that the G9 alliance was supported by Jovenel Moïse and the PHTK party (banner celebrating Moise's inauguration pictured)

In May 2020 a coalition of 11 gangs (Delmas 19, Delmas 6, Delmas 95, Nan Barozi, Nan Belekou, Nan Boston, Nan Chabón, Nan Ti Bwa, Baz Pilate, Simon Pelé and Wharf Jérémie) attacked several neighborhoods in Port-au-Prince as a way to secure and expand territorial control. The same month, they attacked civilians in the neighborhoods of Port-au-Prince, killing 34 people. Altès, the leader of an anti-government gang, switched alliances to the government and gangs allied with Chérizier to assassinate another anti-government leader, Ernso Nicholas. Following the assassination, many pro-government gangs seized control of anti-government gang territory. After the assassination, Chérizier, with assistance from other gangs, organized a meeting in Delmas 6 (a neighborhood that is the primary base of Chérizier's group) to plan an assault in the area of Cité Soleil, Port-au-Prince, perceived as anti-government, including Pont Rouge, Chancerelles and Nan Tokyo.

Chérizier's coalition went through with the attack beginning on 23 May. Chérizier's group is alleged to have attacked civilians in Nan Tokyo including the killing of two American missionaries, while Altès and another leader, Alectis, besieged Pont Rouge. The violence, not far from the General Inspectorate of the National Police of Haiti, lasted from the afternoon to the following day. Many fled the areas due to the violence. On 25 May, a displaced persons camp housing anti-government gangs was attacked by members of the coalition, primarily the Krache Dife de Delmas 6 gang, killing two people, including a minor; 24 houses were also burnt in the raid. On 26 May, Haitian armored police vehicles were positioned at the entrance to Nan Brooklyn. Tear gas was subsequently fired in the area, followed by gunfire targeting civilians. Nan Brooklyn was attacked again by gangs that day and the day after, killing four people, injuring 20 and setting fire to many homes. Chérizier was allegedly transported to the area in a Haitian police armored vehicle, according to witnesses in the area. In the aftermath of the attack, many new gang leaders were installed in the territories seized, which included Chancerelles, Nan Tokyo, Nan Barozi and Delmas 2 and 4. Nan Brooklyn would remain besieged until July, as the siege culminated in a massacre that resulted in the death of 145. By the end of the month, the coalition had been dissolved.

=== Formation of G9 Alliance ===
After those attacks, in a video on YouTube another coalition of nine gangs was announced to be founded in Port-au-Prince in June 2020, which became the G9 Alliance led by Chérizier. All the member gangs had previous links to the ruling PHTK party of President Jovenel Moïse. Since the coalition was founded, it has been responsible for multiple massacres against civilians and clashes with other rival gangs. From 2020 to 2021, the G9 was responsible for a dozen massacres in which at least 200 people were killed. The G9 was believed to have had close ties to the government of Moïse, which was accused of large-scale corruption. The coalition members frequently evaded prosecution after the massacres and the clashes. Chérizier stood out in this regard because despite the arrest warrants against him, he continued to move freely and to maintain an active presence on social media with no effective attempts by the Haitian government to arrest him. The G9 also began attacking neighborhoods in which civilians protested against the president and started clashes against rival gangs with the support of the police.

In response to the growing dominance of G9, a rival gang alliance, called "G-Pep", was founded in July 2020. It consisted of mainly those gangs in Port-au-Prince's Cité Soleil who were strongly opposed to joining G9. In the following months, both gang alliances began to expand beyond their initial areas of operation.

On 25 February 2021, hundreds of inmates started a jailbreak from the prison in which they were detained resulting in 26 deaths in Croix-des-Bouquets, Ouest, Haiti. Arnel Joseph, a powerful gang leader linked to 400 Mawozo, organized the riot and escaped from the jail. He fled with an accomplice in a car, but was then found by police, and a gunfight followed. Joseph was shot dead and declared dead at the scene, while his accomplice, who was driving the vehicle, was wounded but fled the scene.

On April 2, fighting in Bel Air led to the burning of houses and at least three killed. Jimmy "Barbecue" Chérizier accepted responsibility for the attacks. On 12 May 2021, during a clash with G-Pep, Chérizier was reported to be wounded.

=== Escalation ===
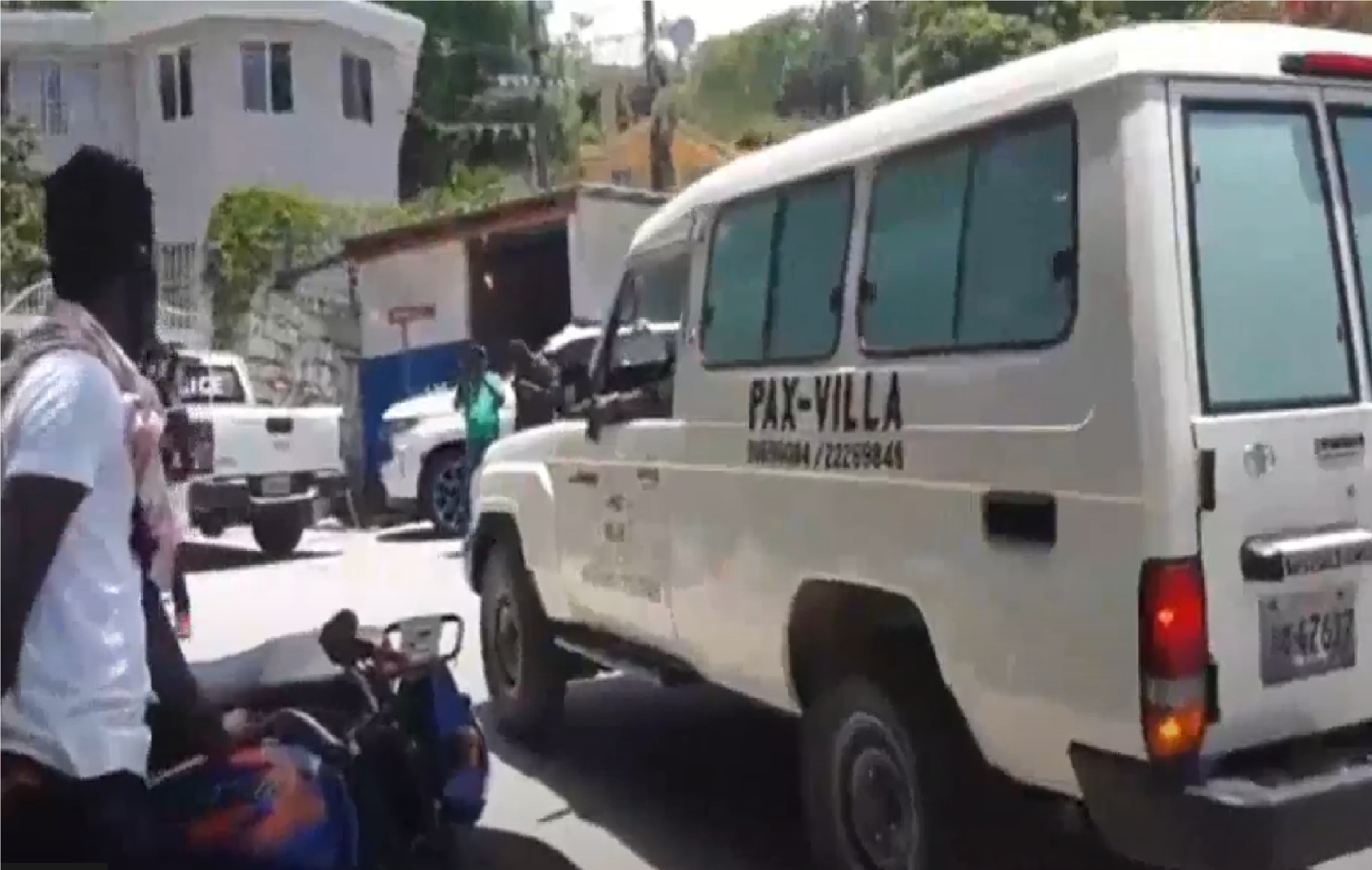
President Jovenel Moïse‘s body in a van

After the assassination of President Moïse on 7 July 2021, the G9 helped the government in the manhunt against the 28 foreign perpetrators. After the assassination, Ariel Henry, who some believe to be linked to the killing, became acting prime minister of Haiti. This brought on a new wave of violence, as the gangs exploited the government's weakness. After the death of his suspected ally Moïse, Chérizier increasingly voiced political ambitions and began to openly oppose the Haitian government of Henry. On 14 August 2021, a magnitude 7.2 earthquake struck the Tiburon Peninsula of southern Haiti, killing at least 2,248 people and injuring more than 12,200. At least 137,500 buildings were damaged or destroyed. Following the earthquake, gangs had overtaken neighborhoods and villages in Haiti. "According to the National Human Rights Defense Network, there are more than 90 gangs in the country, likely with thousands of members and far more powerful than the police," Bloomberg reported. In mid-August, the gangs announced a ceasefire to allow trucks to use the road to provide aid to southern communities. Several trucks were looted at gunpoint, despite the truce. On 19 August, two of Haiti's doctors, including one of the few orthopedic surgeons, were kidnapped. It is unclear whether gangs were responsible for these abductions; however kidnapping is a common gang practice. The kidnappers contacted the doctor's families, however the ransom demands are unknown. On 17 October, G9 forced Henry to flee an official commemoration event, then began a month-long blockade of the country's largest oil terminal. Though G9 initially declared that it would lift the blockade only if the government resigned, Henry refused to step down; instead, both sides eventually agreed to a secret deal, and G9 retreated from the oil terminal. In general, Henry held only limited power, and U.S. diplomat Daniel Lewis Foote described Henry as "kind of a clown. [The gangs] in several instances have made him pay them a bunch of money in order for him to attend an event or hold a ceremony—and then they won't let him do it". On 1 January 2022, an armed group targeted Prime Minister Ariel Henry's visit to Gonaïves, resulting in one death and two injuries. On 6 January, two journalists were killed and their bodies burned during a gang attack in Port-au-Prince.

By 2022, most gangs in the capital had aligned themselves with either G9 or G-Pep. From April to May, the Battle of Plaine du Cul-de-Sac was fought between 400 Mawozo, Chen Mechan, G-9 An Fanmi e Alye, and two other gangs. Over 200 deaths, many of whom were civilians, resulted from the fighting. In May 2022, 400 Mawozo aligned with G-Pep, greatly improving G-Pep's position against G9 in the gang war and causing a further escalation of violence. On 10 June, the 5 Seconds Village de Dieu gang captured the Court of First Instance of Port-au-Prince. On 8 and 9 July, the violence between the two gangs increased after the start of street battles in Port-au Prince that killed 89 people (47 gang members and 42 civilians) and injured 74. The battle caused the nearby Varreux field terminal, the country's largest fuel depot, to pause operations and led to a drastic shortage in fuel as two fuel tankers were unable to be unloaded. Doctors Without Borders has stated that the organization has been unable to access the slum because of the violence. In September, amid the increase of the price of the fuel for the socioeconomic crisis, the G9 began a blockade of the Varreux fuel terminal. The gang demanded that Henry resign and that the government reduce prices for fuel and basic goods. Inflation in Haiti had recently risen around 30 percent, exacerbating the situation. On 6 November, after two weeks of negotiations with the Haitian government and an armed offensive launched by the Haitian National Police, the G9 gang coalition relinquished control of the Varreux fuel terminal. On 14 November, armed individuals, linked to the 400 Mawozo gang, fired shots at a U.S. Embassy convoy composed of vehicles belonging to the U.S. Embassy and Haitian National Police, as well as commercial vehicles. A Haitian driver was injured, but no police or embassy personnel were reported harmed.

From late 2022, an anti-gang bwa kale vigilante movement emerged to attack and kill any gang members. The vigilantes often burned captured gang members alive. The vigilantes also turned against regular security forces and murdered at least one police officer who had no known gang connections. The gangs responded to the growth of the vigilante groups with counter-attacks that killed community leaders who expressed support for self-defense actions.

In December 2022, Canada imposed economic sanctions on Gilbert Bigio, Haiti's richest businessman, for his role in "protect[ing] and enabl[ing] the illegal activities of the armed criminal gangs".

In January 2023, 18 police officers were murdered in Port-au-Prince by the Gran Grif gang. This prompted riots organized by the police as well as Fantom 509, a police-allied gang. By March 2023, Haitian officials speculated that up to 90% of the capital was controlled by gangs. A series of battles between gangs in early March led to the deaths of 208 people, and kidnappings jumped 72% from the first quarter of the previous year. Doctors, lawyers, and other wealthy members of society were kidnapped and held for ransom. Jean-Dickens and Abigail Toussaint, a Haitian American couple, were kidnapped on 18 March and later released. Robert Denis, the director of the TV station Canal Bleu, was kidnapped on 11 April; also Harold Marzouka, the Vice-Consul of Saint Kitts and Nevis and CEO of Haiti Plastics, was kidnapped on 15 April. In April 2023, three gangs (Titanyen, Base 5 Secondes, and Canaan) conducted an offensive in the Cabaret commune, outside Port-au-Prince, in an attempt to break a blockade imposed by local self-defense groups. At least 100 people were killed in the fighting. On 9 April, three police officers were killed in an ambush by the Ti Makak gang in the Thomassin neighborhood. On 14 April, another battle erupted in Port-au-Prince's Cité Soleil between G-Pep's Nan Brooklyn gang and G9's Belekou and Boston gangs. The clash lasted six days and resulted in at least 70 deaths.

According to leaked American documents in late February, the Wagner Group began exploring pathways and expressed interest in intervening in Haiti.

Lynchings of gang members by vigilantes grew in frequency: 30 lynchings were reported in May, double the number in April, which killed 150 people. In Pétion-Ville, checkpoints were established by residents to conduct identity checks in order to identify gang members. Machetes were distributed in the capital in an effort to curb the gang violence. In response to the growth of the bwa kale movement, President Ariel Henry asked that the initiators of the movement "calm down" and hand over suspected bandits and gang members to the police.

By mid-2023, the gang war between G9 and G-Pep continued unabated, and the resistance by anti-gang vigilantes also grew in scope. Thousands of people were displaced by the clashes. The severity of the ongoing gang war led the United Nations Security Council to authorize a one-year deployment of an international force led by Kenya to help the Haitian government deal with the crisis. Chérizier declared that G9 would resist if an international intervention force committed "human rights abuses" and claimed that it would "be a fight of the Haitian people to save the dignity of our country."

On 22 September, the Taliban gang of Canaan run by Jeff Larose attacked the touristic town of Saut-d'Eau at the request of 5 Seconds gang leader Johnson "Izo" Alexandre, resulting in many injuries and at least 12 deaths. The motive for the attack, which lasted several days and spread to Mirebalais, was thought to be related to arms smuggling.

On 1 November, the Grand Ravine gang, led by Ti Lapli, launched attacks against the Mariani area, killing one police officer and sparking over 2,400 civilians to leave their homes. The gangs gained control over the National Directorate for Water and Sanitation's offices in the area, which are used to supply water to other areas in Port-au-Prince. It was believed that the occupation endangered the safety of the water supply. On 8 December, the United States Treasury Department announced sanctions placed on four Haitian gang leaders, Johnson André ("Izo"), Renel Destina ("Ti Lapli"), Vitel'Homme Innocent, and Wilson Joseph ("Lanmò San Jou"), for human rights violations.

On 12 December, the Haitian National Police launched an operation from Carrefour into Mariani, with an assault involving excavators resulting in the razing of many houses around the market alleged to have been used by gang members. Several civilians in the area were injured in the clashes. In a 20 December press conference, the Haitian national police announced its intention to conduct greater police operations in Port-au-Prince to protect civilians, regulate traffic and stem gang violence during the end-of-year period. Intensified police presences would be instated throughout the city. On 26 December, the U.S. Embassy in Port-au-Prince went on lockdown after gunfire was heard in the area.

In a 2023 UN report by Robert Muggah estimates there could be as many as half a million weapons in the country. When interviewed in 2024, he said that over 80 percent of those traced by the ATF from 2020 and 2022 arrived from the U.S. A UN report issued on 15 January 2024 indicates that in the preceding year there had been 2,490 kidnappings and 4,789 reported homicides. On 1 February, Joly Germine, the leader of 400 Mawozo, pleaded guilty in a U.S. federal court to smuggling arms such as "AK-47s, AR-15s, an M4 carbine rifle, an M1A rifle, and a .50-caliber rifle" into Haiti, piloting the operation from a Haitian prison.

=== Ousting of Ariel Henry ===
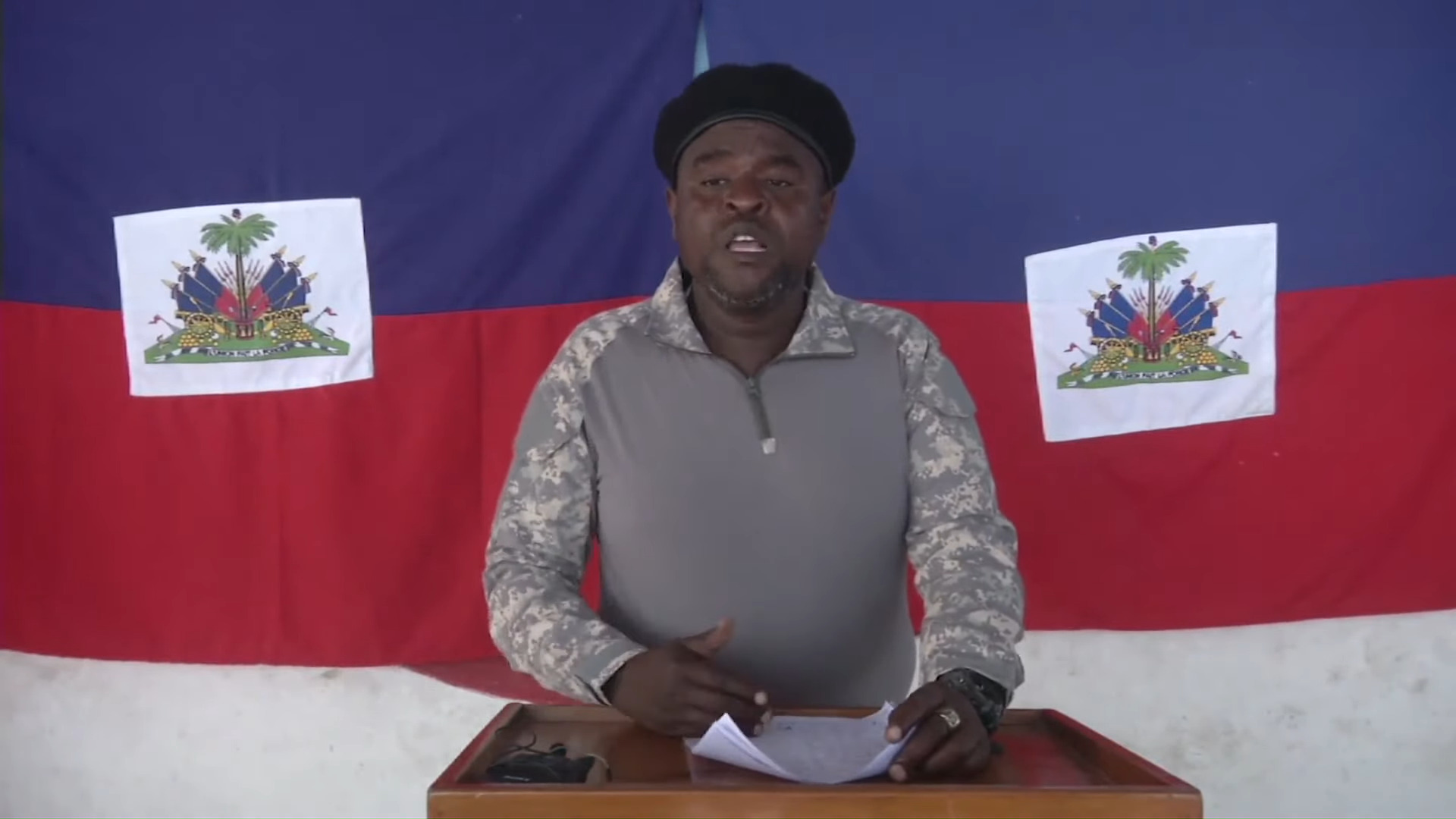
Chérizier giving a speech in 2024.

On 29 February 2024, a wave of violence broke out while the acting prime minister, Ariel Henry, traveled to Kenya to sign an agreement that circumvent the Kenyan High Court's earlier ruling declaring the UN-backed operation to assist the Haitian government as unconstitutional under Kenyan law. Gunfire was directed at Toussaint Louverture International Airport and many businesses in the area, with two police stations seized, forcing businesses to close and Sunrise Airways to cease operations. On 29 February, the Bahamas, Bangladesh, Barbados, Benin and Chad pledged troops to the Multinational Security Support Mission in Haiti, with the largest being Benin's commitment of 1,500 soldiers, in addition to the agreement with Kenya providing 1,000 police officers. Belize and Antigua and Barbuda have also pledged people to assist with the mission. U.S. officials said that American troops will not be sent.

Chérizier released a video stating that he intended to prevent Henry from returning to Haiti with the operation. On 1 March, when asked if it was safe for him to return to Haiti, Henry shrugged. Chérizier was said to have the support of other gangs as part of a coalition named "Viv Ansanm" (Haitian Creole for "living together"); though that coalition was quick to dissolve, other gangs still launched attacks together with Chérizier's G9 gang. The G9 gang launched an offensive within Port-au-Prince, Chérizier announced the aim of capturing the Haitian cabinet and police chief. Four police officers were killed during a shooting outside a police station. Gunfire at the airport on 1 March caused damage to some aircraft.

On 2 and 3 March, armed gangs stormed the two largest prisons, one in Croix des Bouquets, the other in Port-au-Prince, resulting in more than 4,700 inmates escaping. With a force of only 9,000 at work, police were undermanned and outgunned by the gangs. The gang leaders, including Chérizier, demanded Henry's resignation. In particular, Chérizier said his goal was to capture Haiti's police chief and government ministers and prevent Henry's return. At least 12 people were killed in the conflict, while the UN estimates that 15,000 people have fled the violence in Port-au-Prince. On 3 March the Haitian government under Finance Minister Michel Patrick Boisvert declared a 72-hour state of emergency and a nighttime curfew in an attempt to curb the violence and chaos; the government noted "increasingly violent criminal acts" throughout Port-au-Prince, including vandalism, kidnapping and murder. According to the United Nations, gangs controlled around 80% of Port-au-Prince. On 4 March gangs attacked the heavily fortified Toussaint Louverture International Airport, exchanging gunfire with police and the Haitian Armed Forces in an attempt to take control of the facility after rumors that Henry would return to the country, fueling speculation that an alliance between rival gangs was forming to overthrow the Haitian government. In particular, Johnson André, the leader of the 5 Seconds gang, appeared to be linked to the attacks. Other riot leaders, including Guy Philippe who led the 2004 Haitian coup d'état, reportedly aimed for the presidency of Haiti. Flights were grounded as the airport was shut down, and the Stade Sylvio Cator and national bank were also attacked. Other public institutions including schools and banks were closed.

On 5 March, United Nations Secretary-General António Guterres stated his desire for "urgent action, particularly in providing financial support for the multinational security support mission". Later that day, Henry landed at Luis Muñoz Marín International Airport in Puerto Rico in an attempt to return to Haiti to control the violence. On 6 March, a police station in Bas-Peu-de-Chose was attacked and burned down. The privately owned Caribbean Port Services terminal at the Port international de Port-au-Prince, notable for its key role in providing food and supplies, was also attacked and looted, resulting in port operations being suspended indefinitely. On 8 March, gangs attacked the National Palace and two police stations and burned down the interior ministry. The security perimeter around Toussaint Louverture International Airport was breached by gangs, while gunfire was heard throughout Port-au-Prince.

On 9 March gangs attacked and occupied the headquarters of the Institute of Social Welfare in Port-au-Prince, while the government of the Dominican Republic announced plans to evacuate its officials and citizens from Port-au-Prince. A large counteroffensive against the gangs was launched by the Haitian police force in the later hours of the night after three more police stations were attacked and burned down, with reports coming in that multiple Haitian police cars were stolen and are now patrolling the area. On 10 March the United States evacuated its nonessential staff from its embassy in Port-au-Prince via helicopter, while adding additional Marine Corps troops to the embassy to defend it. The European Union also evacuated all diplomatic staff, and the German embassy was evacuated by elements of the Dominican Republic Air Force. The Prime Minister of Jamaica announced on 11 March that representatives from eight countries, including France, Canada, and the United States, would meet in Kingston, Jamaica, to discuss the ongoing violence.

On 11 March, CARICOM launched an emergency meeting to discuss the situation in Haiti. Kithure Kindiki of Kenya announced that its police officers were ready to deploy; however, with no deployment date, there was a lot of international pressure from the United States and multiple meetings between the United States and Kenya over the deployment, with one being held on 11 March between Kenyan President William Ruto and U.S. Secretary of State Antony Blinken. Toussaint Louverture International Airport was closed. Secretary Blinken later announced that the United States would offer another $100 million to the Kenyan mission in Haiti.

On 12 March, Ariel Henry declared that he would resign amid massive pressure from the international community. Sheila Cherfilus-McCormick, a U.S. congresswoman of Haitian descent, released a press statement saying that the gang takeover of Haiti posed a security threat to the United States and warned of violence spilling over to the United States. She also told reporters that she would be holding a meeting with Haitian leaders from South Florida to discuss the country's ongoing conflict. U.S. Department of Defense officials stated later that they are "alerted" about a potential maritime "mass migration" from Haiti. Use of the United States Navy was considered to stop the flow of migration.

On 13 March, Ruto announced that the mission to Haiti, while paused, would still move forward. The United States announced a plan to contribute $40 million for the Multinational Mission in Haiti. Florida Governor Ron DeSantis announced plans to deploy 250 additional soldiers to help deal with a possible crisis in Florida, including the Florida National Guard. The same day a U.S. Fleet Antiterrorism Security Team was sent to protect the U.S. embassy. A YouTube personality YourFellowArab (Addison Pierre Maalouf) specialized in touring dangerous places was allegedly kidnapped on his way to interview Chérizier. Members of 400 Mawozo demanded a ransom of $600,000 for his release. The U.S. State Department confirmed that a U.S. citizen had been kidnapped.

On 19 March, CARICOM and United Nations officials appointed seven seats out of eight of the presidential council. The formation of the full council was delayed because of 21 December Agreement group backing the acting prime minister. On 21 March one of the gang leaders, known as Makandal, was killed by the bwa kale in Pétion-Ville. A day later, Ernst Julme, the leader of Delmas 95, was killed by police in the same area. Julme's death was described as a significant setback for Chérizier in his attempts to take over Port-au-Prince. In the same day, gangs attacked the neighborhood of Petion-Ville in Port-au-Prince, killing at least five people. On 25 April, Henry resigned and was replaced by the Transitional Presidential Council. Later, on 28 May, the transitional council chose Garry Conille as the acting prime minister.

In May, in the clashes between gangs and security forces three armored vehicles of the police were destroyed and set on fire. On 24 May, two American Christian missionaries, one of them the daughter of a Missouri State Representative, and a Haitian pastor were killed in a gang ambush in Port-au-Prince. On 18 June the International Organization for Migration reported that more than 580,000 people have been displaced by the increased violence in Haiti since March 2024. The report also warned that since most of the people displaced have been from communities already struggling with poor social conditions, there may be more tension and violence in the coming days. On 16 August, several inmates escaped from a prison in Saint-Marc following a strike by prison staff. Eleven of them were subsequently killed in police operations, while a twelfth was recaptured. On 20 August, the US imposed sanctions on former president Michel Martelly for alleged involvement in drug trafficking and sponsorship of gangs involved in the Haitian crisis.

=== Multinational intervention ===
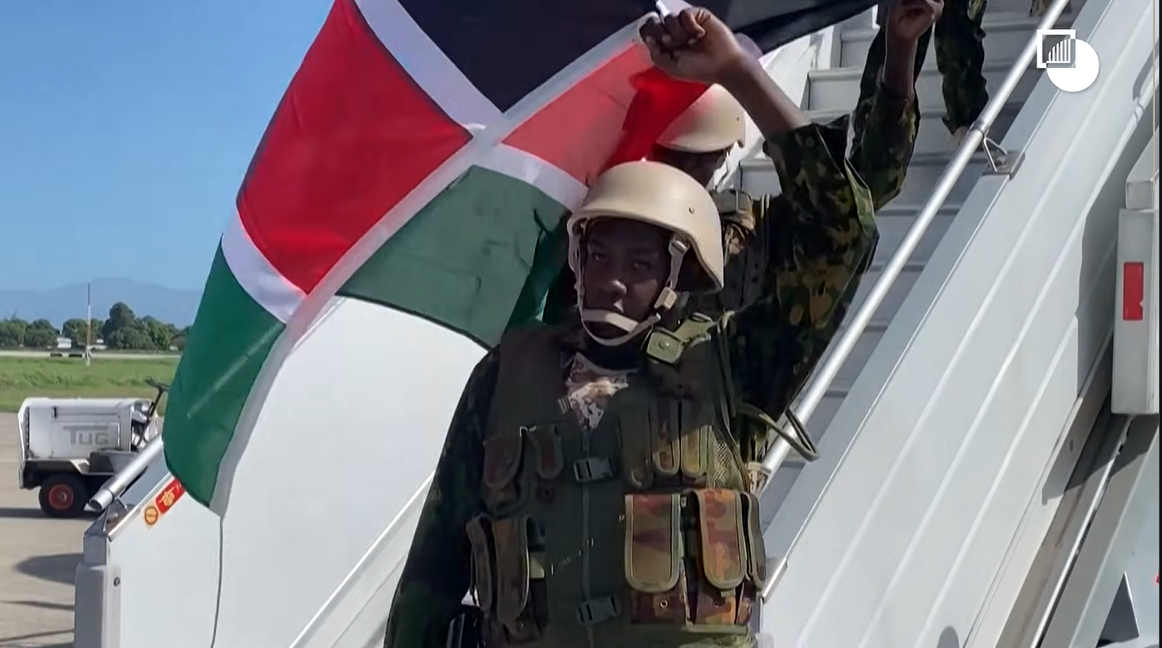
MSS police unit arriving in Port-au-Prince

On 26 June 2024, Kenya's first contingent of 400 police officers landed in Port-au-Prince after months of delay. A second Kenyan contingent consisting of 200 officers arrived on 16 July. This is the first time that an African Union country led a major peacekeeping operation outside of Africa. On 28 August 2024, Haitian National Police and Kenya Police, along with other foreign police forces as part of the Multinational Security Support Mission in Haiti, launched a joint operation to oust criminal gangs from parts of Port-au-Prince. A contingent consisting of twenty Jamaican soldiers, four Jamaican policemen and two Belizean soldiers arrived in Haiti on 12 September. Seventy-five Guatemalan Army military policeman, and eight airmen from the Salvadoran Air Force landed in Port-au-Prince on 3 January 2025. The Multinational Security Support mission was transformed into the UN-supported Gang Suppression Force on 2 October 2025. On 5 February 2026, the Haitian National Police received 3 K200A1s for use against the gangs. Côte d’Ivoire will deploy 812 soldiers to Haiti to fight alongside Haitian Police against Haitian gangs, with a first battalion of 100 soldiers to arrive on 23 November 2026.

=== Formation of Viv Ansanm ===
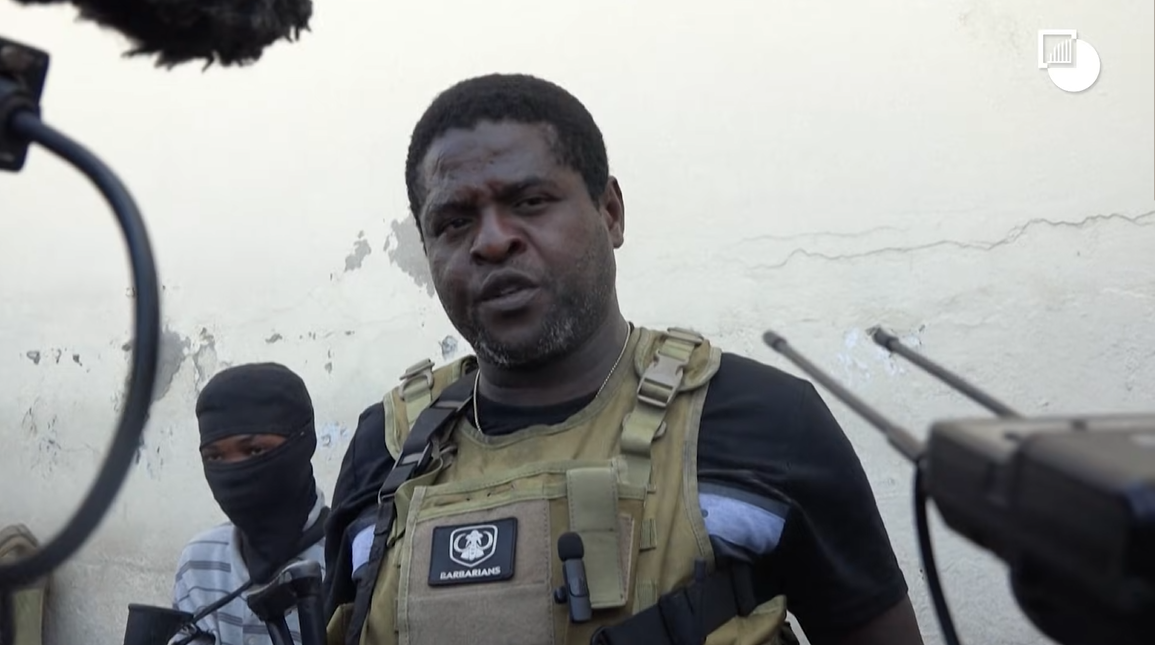
Jimmy Chérizier, leader of the coalition, during an interview.

On 29 February 2024, the Revolutionary Forces of the G9 Family and Allies united with G-Pèp to form the Viv Ansanm alliance, meaning "Live Together" in Haitian Creole. The alliance initially collapsed in a matter of weeks, but it was revived in early 2024 before the incoming deployment of the Multinational Security Support mission. The coalition was created by Jimmy Chérizier, although notably it is a loose coalition and is not formally led by him. Viv Ansanm controls around 80% of metropolitan Port-au-Prince, as well as many surrounding towns. Chérizier initially described the Viv Ansanm movement as demanding dialogue with the Conille government, and that Viv Ansanm is in opposition to the Haitian and American oligarchs holding power over Haiti. In a June 2024 interview, Chérizier spoke regarding the Kenyan police operation in Haiti, saying that the "politicians and oligarchs ... [called in] assassins and mercenaries from Kenya on the pretext that they will crush the gangs and battle Viv Ansanm. They will fight. Viv Ansanm will fight. The Kenyans are protecting the interests of the American oligarchs ... That's why they brought them here."

On 18 September, Kerwin Augustin, a regional official of the National Office of Migration, was shot dead by unidentified gunmen in Cap-Haïtien. On 10 October, at least three people were killed in an attack by the Taliban gang on Arcahaie. Between 12 and 14 October, twenty members of the Kraze Baryè gang were killed during police operations against the group in Torcelle. On 17 October, gangs launched attacks on the Solino, Saint Michel and Tabarre 27 neighborhoods of Port-au-Prince. On 22 October, a boat carrying members of the Viv Ansanm gang capsized after hitting a reef near Arcahaie, killing at least 12 passengers. On the same day, SOS Journalists and the Association of Haitian Journalists (AJH) released statements calling upon authorities to take measures to protect journalists threatened by the Viv Ansanm gang coalition led by Chérizier. On 11 November, a Spirit Airlines A320neo (N966NK), originating from Ft Lauderdale, Florida, was grazed by gang-related gunfire. After aborting its approach, Flight 951 diverted safely to Cibao International Airport (STI), Santiago, Dominican Republic. Crew onboard the aircraft were grazed by light arm fire but sustained no serious injuries. The aircraft was inspected, and damage was found to be consistent with arms fire. Spirit, American Airlines and JetBlue suspended service to the airport before the Federal Aviation Administration ordered all US carriers to avoid Haitian airspace for the next 30 days. On 19 November, twenty-eight suspected Viv Ansanm members were killed by the police in Pétion-Ville.

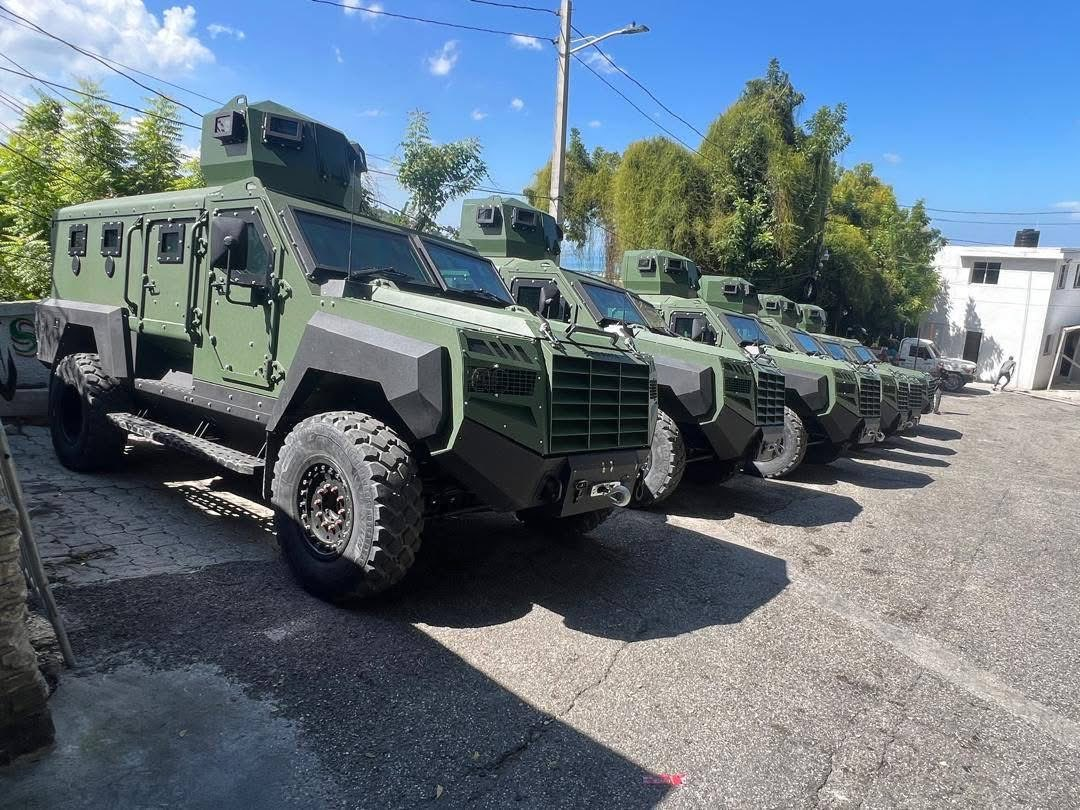
RAM MRAP model of the Roshel Senator delivered from Canada to Haiti for the Haitian Army to fight against the gangs.

Between 6 and 7 December, at least 207 people were killed in Cité Soleil, Port-au-Prince as part of a series of attacks targeting elderly people and voodoo practitioners conducted by the Wharf Jérémie gang, whose leader Micanor Altès accused the victims of causing his son's fatal illness. Between 9 and 10 December, amid an escalating conflict between the Gran Grif gang and self-defense groups, the Chandelle self-defense group (Force Résistance Chandelle) carried out an assault using guns and machetes against residents of Bois Laville and Passe Barque in the Petite Rivière de l'Artibonite, killing 39 civilians which the group said were linked to Gran Grif. On 11 December, as retaliation for the attack, again in Petite Rivière de l'Artibonite, Gran Grif killed 70 people. On 24 December, three people, including two journalists, were killed in a gun attack on the general hospital of Port-au-Prince. On 26 December, the transitional government dismissed Duckenson Lorthe as health minister over the attack on Port-au-Prince general hospital.

==== Expansion into Artibonite ====
Allied with the G-Pèp and G9 forces of Viv Ansanm, the Gran Grif gang based in the Artibonite department of Haiti also increased the scope of their attacks, despite already being known as one of Haiti's cruelest gangs. On 3 October 2024 they attacked the town of Pont-Sondé, conducting a massacre that left at least 115 people dead and 50 injured, and thousands more fleeing the town. On 29 April 2025, Gran Grif launched an attack on Petite-Rivière-de-l'Artibonite. On 23 July, five people, including three police officers, were killed in an attack perpetred by Gran Grif in Artibonite Department. Between 29 March 2026 and 1 April 2026, at least 70 people were killed and 30 injured during attacks by the Gran Grif gang against a vigilante group in the areas of Petite-Rivière, Jean-Denis, Pont-Sondé and Marchand-Dessalines. Dozens of houses were burned down and nearly 6,000 people were forced to flee.

The department has seen a massive spike in violence in 2025 due to the Viv Ansanm gangs. Previously, it was relatively shielded from the violence, along with most other areas outside of Port-au-Prince. Because of this, the police forces and locals of the region are not well-prepared to defend themselves, leading to the formation of armed self-defense brigades in the region such as La Coalition, who have been accused of their own human rights violations. On 20 May 2025, they were accused of killing at least 55 civilians linked to Gran Grif in the town of Préval.

=== Gang offensives since 2025 ===
On 27 January 2025, armed gangs assaulted Belot and Godet communities of Kenscoff, killing at least 50 people, injuring 11, and displacing 3,000 people. At least 20 gang members were reportedly killed by security forces. On 24 February, the Mission suffered its first casualty when a Kenyan Police officer, Samuel Tompei Kaetuai, was killed in a gunfight with gangs while assisting Haitian Police. The next day, two haitian soldiers and a dozen civilians were killed in an attack by gangs on the Delmas 30 neighborhood of Port-au-Prince. As retaliation, on 2 March, the police launched a massive security operation on the Lower Delmas neighborhood of Port-au-Prince, killing multiple gang members. On 25 March gang members launched an attack on Haitian police and the Multinational Security Support (MSS) mission in the Artibonite region in northern Port-au-Prince, killing two Kenyan police officers and destroying three MRAPs armored vehicles, two of the MSS and one of the Haitian police. In April, Viv Ansanm stormed the police station and prison in Mirebalais, setting the buildings on fire and freeing around 500 prisoners. On 20 April, three soldiers were killed in an ambush by gangs in Kenscoff. On 23 April, two soldiers and four civilians were killed in attacks by gangs in Kenscoff. Two other soldiers and at least 35 members of the Viv Ansanm gang were killed during another attack in Pacot, Port-au-Prince.

On 12 May, a helicopter was targeted by gang members in the Carrefour Vincent area, where gang members opened fire on the aircraft as it flew overhead. Several bullets hit the helicopter, forcing it to crash a short distance away in the Bourdon neighborhood. There were no casualties. On 2 July, UN Assistant Secretary-General Miroslav Jenča told the Security Council that Port-au-Prince has been "paralyzed by gangs" and warned that the "total collapse of state presence in the capital could become a very real scenario". Ghada Waly, the head of the UN Office on Drugs and Crime, said "As gang control expands, the state's capacity to govern is rapidly shrinking". On 6 July, the historic Hotel Oloffson in Port-au-Prince was destroyed in an arson attack by armed gangs. On 17 July, businessman and former presidential candidate Reginald Boulos was arrested in the United States on charges of involvement with the Viv Ansanm gang. Between 17 and 18 July, nine civilians were killed by gang members in L'Estère, Artibonite, in retaliation for the killing of the gang's leader by a self-defense group. On 22 July, an ambush by the Gran Grif gang in Liancourt left at least three police officers dead and one missing. On 2 August, former senator Nenel Cassy was arrested in Pétion-Ville on charges of conspiring against the state and financing criminal organizations who launched an attack in Kenscoff in February that killed dozens. On 4 August, nine people were kidnapped from Sainte-Hélène orphanage in the commune of Kenscoff, Ouest. The attackers raided the facilities at around 3:30 am, kidnapping the nun, the minor and seven employees, in an act that has been described as premeditated. On 25 August, police retook the Téléco hub in Kenscoff from gangs. On 12 September, at least 42 people were killed following an attack by the Viv Ansanm gang on the village of Labodrie. On 15 September, a gang attack on an armored vehicle killed the driver and injures two police officers in Kenscoff. 16 September, gang leader and former Artibonite Resistance Front’s leader Wilfort Ferdinand, who participated in the overthrow of president Jean-Bertrand Aristide in 2004, was shot dead in a shootout at a police checkpoint in Gonaïves. On 18 September, one person was killed in one of the first attacks by gangs in Northern Haiti, in the town of Bassin-Bleu. On 23 September, a drone attack in Cité Soleil killed 13 people (including eight children) and wounded six civilians, after the gang leader Albert Steevenson, known as Djouma or “King Jouma” was celebrating his birthday and distributing gifts there. Human rights organizations denounced that local police forces were behind the attack, using this method more regularly. On 9 October, a meeting of the Transitional Presidential Council at the National Palace in Port-au-Prince was halted by gunfire blamed on gangs, resulting in the evacuation of government officials. On 13 November, seven gang members were killed during a Haitian police operation in Croix-des-Bouquets, Ouest, where officers destroyed a helicopter that made an emergency landing, to prevent its capture. On the same day there was an attack on the U.S. embassy in Haiti by gangs.

On 17 November, a police officer was killed in an attack by gangs on Arcahaie. On 18 November, Haiti qualified for the 2026 World Cup beating Nicaragua in Willemstad; due to the ongoing war and the invasion and vandalization of the Stade Sylvio Cator by the gangs, the national team was unable to host any matches in Haiti, instead playing all of its qualifying fixtures at neutral sites. On 23 November, a Sunrise Airways aircraft was reportedly hit by bullets while taxiing on the tarmac at Port-au-Prince's Toussaint Louverture International Airport after arriving from Les Cayes, forcing the airline to cancel all of its domestic routes in Haiti. In December 2025 the Haitian National Police launched a sustained operation against gangs in Carrefour Aéroport, a major intersection in Port-au-Prince. The police station there, destroyed by gangs in March 2024, was reopened on 7 February 2026. On 8 December, at least 49 people were killed in clashes between gangs in Port-au-Prince.

Shark armored personnel carrier of the Haitian Army in Port-au-Prince.

On 14 January 2026, Haitian security forces and Vectus Global’s mercenaries targeted and destroyed three homes belonging to Jimmy Chérizier during a major military operation attempting to kill the gang leader using FPV drones; Chérizier survived. On 3 February, amid the War on cartels launched in 2025 by the administration of United States’ president Donald Trump, the US deployed a guided-missile destroyer and two U.S. coast guard boats to patrol the bay of Port-au-Prince. The deployment was ordered by United States Secretary of Defense Pete Hegseth to allegedly support security, counter the illegal drug trade in Haiti and demonstrate support for Haitian stability, intimating via social media its intent on quashing attempts by members of the Transitional Presidential Council (TPC) to oust Prime Minister Alix Didier Fils-Aimé before the council’s mandate expires on 7 February. On 13 April, seven people were killed in an attack by gangs on Marigot. On 11 June, gunmen abducted James Boyard, cabinet director of the Defense Ministry and concurrent inspector general of the Haitian National Police, in the Bourdon neighborhood of Port-au-Prince.

IAG Guardians of the Haitian Army patrolling Port-au-Prince, September 2026.

On 7 August, an armored vehicle belonging to the Haitian National Police fell into an ambush set by Viv Ansanm’s gang members in Kenscoff, located on the heights of Port-au-Prince, injuring three policemen and burning their vehicle, also an unknown number of bandits was either injured or killed. Also in Kenscoff, on 23 August, at least 47 people were killed, including five children, and over 50 kidnapped in an attack by gangs. During the attack, victims were reportedly executed inside a church compound they had fled to for shelter. The mayor reported that at least 25 homes were set fire and two government employees were killed during the attack. The gang leader, who identifies himself as Izo 2 or "Didi", threatened Vladimir Paraison, director of Haiti's National Police. Attacks on Kenscoff have escalated since the first major attack occurred in January 2025. On 29 October, the Haitian Police, supported by the Task Force, killed several gang members, including “Galaxie”, a gang leader, during an operation in Bercy, between Arcahaie and Cabaret. Between 31 October and 2 November, gangs attacked Arcahaie killing 16 people, including members of self-defense brigades, with some of the bodies buried in a mass grave. On 14 November, at least 10 farmers were killed by Gran Grif in Morne-Robert village, in the Artibonite department. On 19 November, at least 34 bandits were killed by PNH during a major operation in the Martissant neighborhood of Port-au-Prince, controlled by the Grand Ravine gang who’s leader may be between the casualties. On 20 November, PNH killed other 20 bandits in the second day of clashes in the offensive in Martissant.

=== Salvadoran military intervention ===
Salvadoran soldiers arriving in Haiti, 29 October 2026.

On 18 October, four Salvadoran Air Force aviation technicians of the UN-backed GSF were taken hostage after an ambush by gangs on their armoured vehicle in Croix-des-Bouquets, destroying their vehicle with explosives. Helicopters were dispatched to the area but they also came under fire as they dispersed armed men in the area. Mike Waltz, the US ambassador to the UN, condemned the attack during the UN Security Council meeting on Haiti. On 19 October, the GSF and the Haitian National Police later conducted a helicopter offensive against gangs in Plaine du Cul-de-Sac near where the technicians disappeared. The offensive killed several gang members, with unofficial sources claiming that at least 18 were killed and 13 more were injured. A further four GSF personnel were injured. On 21 October, El Salvador launched a military intervention in Haiti. On 24 October, The New York Times reported that the GSF had recovered burned bodies. Nayib Bukele later stated that the bodies were not those of the technicians. On 2 November, Salvadoran troops in armored vehicles advanced into Plaine du Cul-de-Sac, reportedly killing at least a dozen 400 Mawozo and Chèn Méchan gang members. The PNH and GSF supported the Salvadorans in the operation. On 5 November, gang leader Mathias Saintil was killed in Cité Soleil by a loitering munition in an operation conducted by the PNH, the GSF, and El Salvador. Saintil was the first Haitian gang leader to be killed in a military operation since 2024. On 8 November, a Salvadoran helicopters and a Task Force loitering munition destroyed a house belonging to Joseph and killed up to 20 gang members. On 12 November, Haitian security forces, alongside their Task Force and Salvadoran troops, regained “full control” of the Stade Sylvio Cator, with Salvadoran forces taking charge of security there for the time being. During the operation armed robot dogs were deployed to clear out gang members. On 20 November, three Salvadoran soldiers were killed and one injured in an explosion while handling explosive material at one of the camps. In the same day, Haiti signed an agreement for El Salvador to provide assistance in building three prisons in the country, following Haitian justice minister Patrick Pélissier's visit to CECOT.

== Spillover of the war ==
=== Turks and Caicos Islands ===
Since the beginning of the conflict, the Turks and Caicos Islands have been a major immigration point for thousands of displaced Haitians. To prevent an expansion of the conflict, security operations such as "Operation Shepherd", focused on joint policing and armed patrols, including suspending flights to Haiti, increasing sea surveillance, and deploying multi-agency response groups. On 19 July 2024, a migrant boat travelling from Fort Saint-Michel to the Turks and Caicos Islands caught fire off Cap-Haïtien, leaving at least 40 people dead. On 28 July 2025 three people were killed and 10 others injured in the first mass shooting in the islands' history at a popular nightspot in Providenciales; police said it was perpetrated by a Haitian gang.

=== Maritime piracy ===
On 4 April 2024, the Panama-flagged MSC Magalie was attacked in the Caribbean by two Haitian gangs: 5 Seconds and Taliban (no relation to the Afghan Taliban). The Magalie was captured by the armed gangs in the Varreux fuel terminal in Port-au-Prince. All aboard were taken hostage, and a sixth of the cargo, consisting entirely of rice (the primary staple food of Haiti), was stolen. On 7 April the Haitian National Police stormed the seized freighter and engaged in a five-hour gun battle with the gangs, in which two police officers were injured and several of the two gangs' members turned pirate were killed. The ship, owned by U.S. shipping company Claude and Magalie, was recovered by the Haitian police force. The fate of the crew and any other seafarers aboard the Magalie, who were all taken hostage, remained unknown. On 10 September of the same year, the MV Progreso ship was assaulted by gangs in the bay of Port-au-Prince, injuring two people with snipers and kidnapping two Filipino sailors, released a month later.

=== Haiti-Dominican Republic border ===
According to human rights activists, a spike in the deportations of Haitians occurred in 2021, with more than 31,000 sent back to Haiti. Numerous anti-Haitian actions by the Dominican government were cited, including separation of children from their parents, deportations of pregnant women, racial profiling (Haitians are on average darker-skinned than Dominicans), suspension of Haitian student visas, requiring Haitian migrants to register their location, and prohibiting companies from hiring migrants for more than 20% of their workforce. In February 2023, the construction of a wall began along 164 kilometres (102 mi) of the 392-kilometre (244 mi) border with Haiti. The 3.9-metre-high (13 ft) concrete wall is 20-centimeter-thick, topped by a metal mesh, and contains fiber optics for communications, movement sensors, cameras, radar and drones, with 70 watchtowers and 41 access gates for patrolling. The $32 million project would, upon completion, be the second longest border wall in the Americas, after the US-Mexico wall. The wall aims to curb irregular migration, prevent the smuggling of weapons and contraband, and reduce the influx of gang violence from Haiti, especially in light of the ongoing war.

On 2 February 2026, the decapitated bodies of four Haitian women were found near the southern section of the Dominican Republic–Haiti border; one body was found in Dominican territory. On 24 October, amid the Salvadoran intervention in Haiti, the Dominican Republic strengthened the border with Haiti, especially in the border town of Jimaní, deploying more than 10,000 soldiers on the border, as reported by the Secretary to the President José Ignacio Paliza.

== Humanitarian impacts ==
=== Food, water and sanitation ===
Social services such as food, water and medical services have suffered a complete collapse, as medical staff are too scared to leave their homes, and humanitarian organizations are unable to reach people in need. Several hospitals have also been raided by gangs, resulting in a shortage of medical needs in the capital. On 13 February 2025, the general hospital of Port-au-Prince was set on fire by gangs. On 15 October 2025, Médecins Sans Frontières permanently closed its emergency care center in Port-au-Prince due to gang violence. Between 2010 and 2019, Haiti had a cholera epidemic outbreak that killed at least 9,794 people. Starting in September 2022, gangs blocked the country's main fuel port in protest over an announced fuel price hike. Many hospitals shut down or scaled back operations for lack of fuel to power generators. In October 2022 Haitian authorities announced an unexpected resurgence of cholera in the country due to the crisis caused by the conflict and report that at least seven people had died from the disease. By 12 October the Pan American Health Organization reported at least 35 official deaths from cholera, as well as 600 suspected cases in the areas surrounding Port-au-Prince. On 30 October Haiti's Ministry of Health reported that the numbers had risen to 55 deaths and 2,243 suspected cases. By 9 November the ministry reported that the cholera death toll had risen to 136. According to the WHO, from October 2022 to April 2025, around 11,200 cases of cholera and approximately 1,200 deaths were confirmed in Haiti.

The World Food Programme (WFP) reported on 14 October 2022 that a record 4.7 million people (almost half of the country's population) were facing acute hunger in Haiti; using the Integrated Food Security Phase Classification (IPC) scale, the WFP classified 19,000 of those people as belonging to the fifth and highest level on the scale, the "Catastrophe" phase (IPC 5). In 2024, famine conditions increased, resulting in a reported 5,636 people suffering from starvation and 5.7 million civilians—almost half of Haiti's population—suffering from "crisis levels of hunger or worse". Armed gang violence resulted in the displacement of Haitians in addition to preventing supply chains from reaching areas controlled by gangs. While the ongoing gang violence significantly disrupted supply chains and public security, two million Haitians suffering from hunger lived outside of gang violence-impacted areas. Causes for catastrophic food insecurity in these regions included significant inflation that reached a 30% increase for food by July 2024 as a consequence of political and economic instability, causing food to take up 70% of typical expenses for a household. For survival due to the food crisis, mud cookies became one of very few options the poorest people have to stave off hunger. Many women and girls, some only fifteen years old, were forced to engage in prostitution for food. United Nations spokesperson Stéphane Dujarric stated that the Haitian famine represented: “one of the highest proportions of acutely food insecure people in any crisis around the world”. World Food Programme director for Haiti Jean-Martin Bauer referred to the famine as "the worst humanitarian crisis in Haiti since the 2010 earthquake". On 24 October 2024, a UN helicopter, which belonged to the UN's World Food Program, was hit by the gunfires of the gangs; the helicopter landed safely in the capital with no-one injured in the attack.

=== Crimes against civilians ===
In December 2023, the U.S. sanctioned four gang leaders, one of whom, Johnson André, leads the 5 Second gang, which the U.S. Treasury Department identified as being responsible for over 1,000 cases of sexual violence in 2022. Rape, which only became a criminal offense in Haiti in 2005, is being used by gangs as a means of humiliating those living in rival neighborhoods. Abortion is illegal in Haiti, so rape victims are legally required to carry any resulting pregnancy to term. In 2024, Haiti experienced a tenfold increase in sexual violence against children, as reported by the United Nations. UNICEF spokesman James Elder said that armed groups have inflicted severe harm on children, turning their bodies into battlegrounds. Concurrently, escalating armed violence has led to the internal displacement of over half a million children, representing nearly one in eight children nationwide—a 48% rise since September. An unknown number of children participate in various loosely organised armed groups that are engaged in gang wars. According to UN estimates, children comprise up to half of all armed group members, with recruitment driven by widespread poverty, lack of education and collapse of essential services.

Since the start of the conflict, kidnappings increased, with 400 Mawozo responsible for most of the kidnappings. Operating mainly in areas northeast of Port-au-Prince, they specialize in mass abductions, often targeting buses or entire groups, and are known for demanding large ransoms. Their kidnapping operations have made them the most notorious and prolific gang in this regard. In October 2021 seventeen people associated with an American aid group, including five children, were kidnapped by a gang while visiting an orphanage in Port-au-Prince. The kidnappers demanded $17 million for their release. On 7 November 2022 the U.S. Department of Justice unsealed criminal charges against several prominent Haitian gang leaders involved in kidnapping U.S. citizens. The indictments included charges accusing three gang leaders of involvement in the armed kidnapping of 16 U.S. citizens in Haiti in the fall of 2021. Simultaneous with the unsealing the U.S. State Department announced rewards of $3 million for information leading to the capture of the three gang leaders. On 16 May 2025, the gang's leader, Germine Joly, was convicted by a jury in the United States over the mass kidnapping in 2021.

According to UNESCO, at least 13 journalists were reported killed from 2020 to 2024 in Haiti, with nine killed in 2022, the deadliest year for Haitian journalism in recent history. The New York-based Committee to Protect Journalists reported one journalist killed in 2023 and two more in 2024. On 22 October 2024, SOS Journalists and the Association of Haitian Journalists (AJH) released statements calling upon authorities to take measures to protect journalists threatened by the Viv Ansanm gang coalition. On 13 March 2026, journalists Junior Célestin of Radio Television Megastar and Osnel Espérance of Radio Uni FM were abducted by suspected gangs while reporting in Port-au-Prince.

On 17 March 2024, a UNICEF aid container carrying critical items for infants and mothers was looted in that port, in the context of a healthcare crisis where 60% of the hospitals are unable to operate nationally due to medical supply and fuel shortages. Looting and vandalism at St. Francis de Sales hospital in Port-au-Prince caused damage estimated at US$3 million. Up to 20% of medical staff had left Haiti by the beginning of the year. Even before violence escalated shutting down all but one of the capital's hospitals, Haiti had the worst conditions for childbirth in Latin America and the Caribbean, with only "war-torn countries like Sudan and Yemen" having higher mortality rates. Gangs also raided a power station and four substations, stealing equipment and leaving parts of the capital Port-au-Prince without power. On 18 March 2024, 14 bodies were found after a gang attack in Pétion-Ville, a wealthy neighborhood. Police came to rescue an administrative judge when his home was attacked. UNICEF executive director Catherine Russell compared the anarchy to the film Mad Max.

=== Ruins left by the war ===
More than 1,600 schools closed between 2024 and 2025 because of gang violence. At least 331 schools were destroyed by gangs in Port-au-Prince, 47 destroyed in January 2025 alone. Clashes between gangs and security forces transformed whole neighborhoods into ghost towns. CNN reporting in 2026 showed the landscape of Port-au-Prince: years of violence have transformed the downtown area, leaving once-bustling streets overgrown, almost reclaimed by nature.

== Drug trafficking ==
After the start of the war, large cocaine shipments were seen in 2025 in Haiti. On 15 July 2025 a record amount of cocaine was apprehended after a shootout between gangsters and police that killed three suspects near Île de la Tortue, 1,045 kilograms in total, that was likely destined for the US or Canada. A few weeks later, two Haitians were arrested in Jamaica with 1,350 kg of cannabis. In August, Belgian law enforcement caught a 1,150 kg cocaine shipment in Antwerp that was traced to Haiti, via a transshipment in Kingston. In response, the UNODC delivered several armored vehicles and over 350 sets of ballistic gear to the border police (Police Frontalière d'Haïti) throughout 2025.

The United Nations Office on Drugs and Crime issued a "stern warning" in December 2025 about the rise of Haiti as a drug trafficking hub. The foundation of Viv Ansanm, along with diminished state capacity, is causing the surge in smuggling.

== Persecution of Vodouists ==
Amid gang violence, numerous Haitians are visiting Vodou priests known as oungans for urgent requests, ranging from locating loved ones who were kidnapped, finding critical medication needed to keep someone alive or protecting their neighborhoods from gang attacks. During the war, there have been gang attacks that deliberately target civilian Vodou practitioners; the attacks have shifted from competition over territory to a tool for enforcing social control and suppressing cultural identity. In March 2024, the gangs attacked Saut-d'Eau, where the 100-foot waterfall had attracted thousands of Vodou and Christian followers for decades, taking over the town, preventing thousands from participating in the traditional annual pilgrimage meant to honour the Virgin Mary of Mount Carmel, who is closely associated with Vodou goddess Erzulie Dantor. Between 6 and 7 December 2024, the Wharf Jérémie gang in Port-au-Prince executed over 207 people, primarily targeting elderly residents accused of using Vodou to cause a gang leader’s child to fall ill. The massacre, led by Monell McCano Felix in Cité Soleil, involved brutal killings via machetes, knives, and shootings.

== See also ==
- Crime in Haiti
