= Territory of Viv Ansanm =

Quasi-state of the gang federation Viv Ansanm

- Flag
- Motto: ”Manyen youn, manyen tout” “Touch one, touch all” "An attack on one is an attack on all"
- Areas under control of Viv Ansanm
- Status: Quasi-state and rival government
- Demonym: Haitians
- Leader (Note: Leader/Spokesperson of Viv Ansanm)
  - Since 2024: Jimmy Chérizier
- Establishment: Haitian crisis (Haitian conflict)
- History
  - Second establishment of Viv Ansanm: 29 February 2024

Population
  - Estimate: Over 2.7 million (1.6 million of whom women and children, UN report said)

The territory of Viv Ansanm refers to areas controlled by the Viv Ansanm gang coalition since its second establishment in February 2024. In these areas, Viv Ansanm has built quasi-state and parallel government structures.

== Background ==
The Revolutionary Forces of the G9 Family and Allies took control of key infrastructure, including the nation’s largest oil terminal; they held it from September 2022 to November 2022. In September 2023, the Revolutionary Forces of the G9 Family and Allies and G-Pèp formed the alliance Viv Ansanm; however, the alliance collapsed after a few weeks. When the Multinational Security Support Mission was formed on 1 January 2024, as response the two groups formed Viv Ansanm again on 29 February 2024, from then on the Viv Ansanm transformed itself from a criminal enterprise to a governance actor, which started offensives against state institutions, the Viv Ansanm also announced that it plans to transform into a political party.

== Governance ==
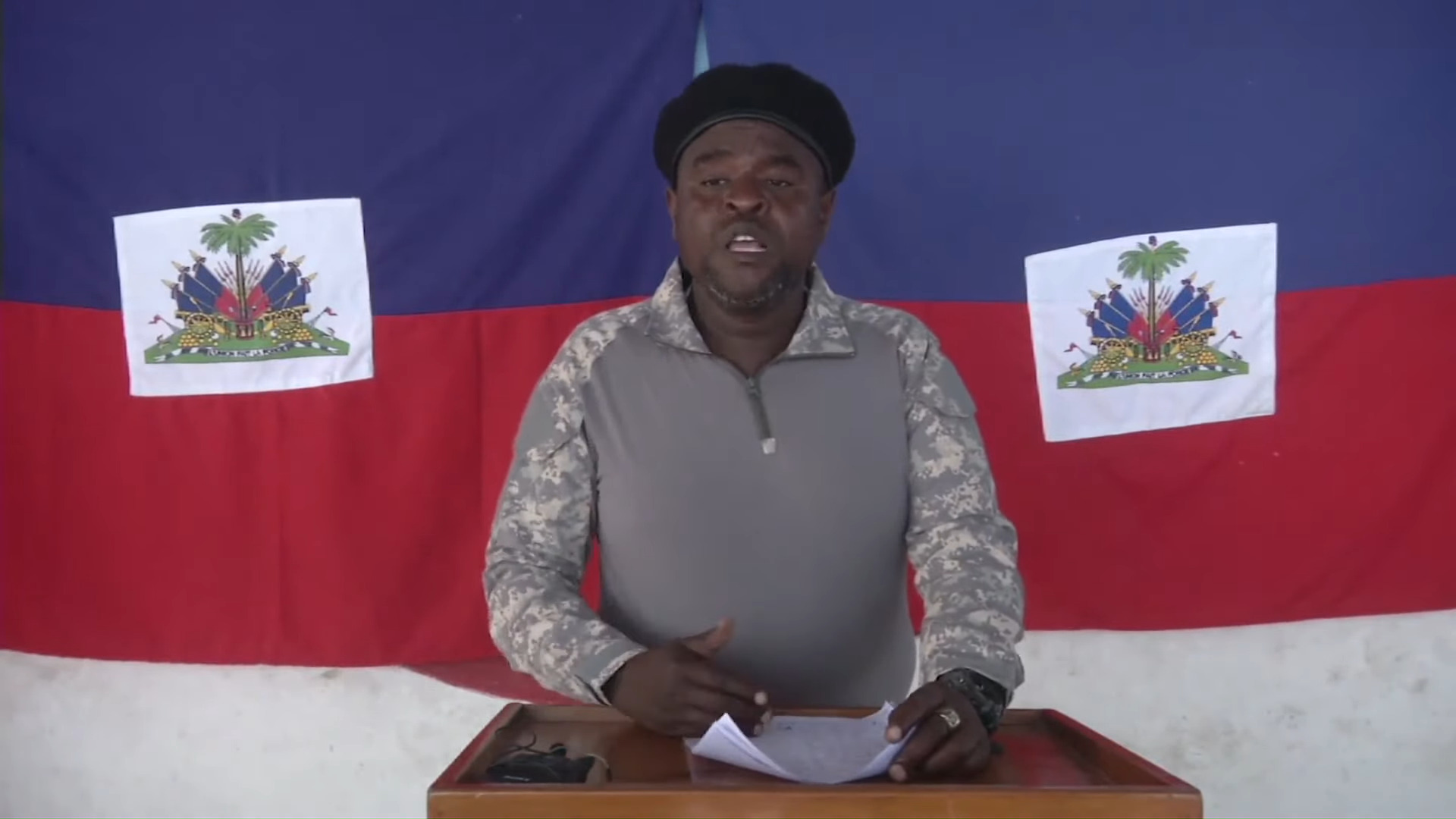
Chérizier making a speech in 2024.

Viv Ansanm uses populism to gain political power by presenting itself as a "Justice movement" that embraces social justice and nationalism; its leader, Jimmy Chérizier, tries to present himself as the protector of the poor and compares himself with Fidel Castro; however, in reality Viv Ansanm uses violence to remain in control or starts massacres, which makes him more similar to former Haitian dictator François Duvalier, whom Chérizier has cited as an inspiration.

=== Healthcare ===
Several hospitals have also been raided by gangs, resulting in a shortage of medical needs in the capital.

==== Famine ====
The World Food Programme (WFP) reported on 14 October 2022 that a record 4.7 million people (almost half of the country's population) were facing acute hunger in Haiti; using the Integrated Food Security Phase Classification (IPC) scale, the WFP classified 19,000 of those people as belonging to the fifth and highest level on the scale, the "Catastrophe" phase (IPC 5). In 2024, famine conditions increased, resulting in a reported 5,636 people suffering from starvation and 5.7 million civilians—almost half of Haiti's population—suffering from "crisis levels of hunger or worse". Armed gang violence resulted in the displacement of Haitians in addition to preventing supply chains from reaching areas controlled by gangs. Many women and girls, some only fifteen years old, were forced to engage in prostitution for food. For survival due to the food crisis, mud cookies became one of very few options the poorest people have to stave off hunger.

==== Cholera epidemic ====
Since October 2022, a new cholera epidemic broke out because of gang violence.

=== Sexual violence ===
Rape is being used by gangs as a means of humiliating those living in rival neighborhoods. In 2024, Haiti experienced a tenfold increase in sexual violence against children, as reported by the United Nations. On 8 December, the United States Treasury Department announced sanctions placed on four Haitian gang leaders, Johnson André ("Izo"), Renel Destina ("Ti Lapli"), Vitel'Homme Innocent, and Wilson Joseph ("Lanmò San Jou"), for human rights violations, which the U.S. Treasury Department identified as being responsible for over 1,000 cases of sexual violence in 2022.

=== Censorship ===
Viv Ansanm have attacked, kidnapped, or killed reporters who cover gang activities, public protests, or institutional failures. Gang members frequently use social media and direct threats to silence reporters and media houses. In coordinated attacks across Port-au-Prince, Viv Ansanm members have raided, looted, and burned down major broadcasting headquarters, including Radio Télévision Caraïbes, Radio Mélodie FM, and Télé Pluriel. Because wearing a press vest often makes reporters a primary target, many Haitian journalists have been forced into hiding or exile.

=== Persecution of the LGBTQ+ ===
Gangs enforce social norms including anti-LGBT hostility. LGBT persons have been targeted in gang-controlled territories.

=== Persecution on Haitian Vodou ===
Between 6 and 7 December 2024, the Wharf Jeremie gang killed 207 people in Cité Soleil in a massacre targeting elderly practitioners of Haitian Vodou accused by the gang’s leader, Monel “Mikano” Felix, of causing his son’s terminal illness.

=== Economy ===
Viv Ansanm impose illicit "taxes" on businesses, markets, and residents across controlled territories, effectively replacing state revenue. Gangs control major highways, ports, and critical infrastructure, stealing shipping containers and charging fees on the movement of goods. Abductions remain a primary source of liquid capital for coalition factions. Another major source of liquid capital for the gangs is the drug trade. Economic analysts note that the coalition functions like a cartel using cooperative game-theory dynamics to divide territorial spoils and coordinate offensives against state institutions.

==== Impact on Haiti’s economy ====
Attacks on ports, airports, and arterial roads have choked imports and domestic trade, driving up prices for basic necessities. Disruptions to agriculture in the Artibonite Valley and commercial transport have pushed roughly 5.7 million Haitians into acute food insecurity.

==== Sanctions ====
The United States designated Viv Ansanm as a terrorist organization in October 2025. The Office of Foreign Assets Control has also sanctioned two members of Viv Ansanm, Dimitri Hérard and Kempes Sanon. All property and financial interests belonging to Viv Ansanm or its sanctioned leaders within the U.S., UK, EU, and UN member jurisdictions are blocked.

=== Ruins in the controlled areas ===
A CNN reportage in 2026 showed Viv Ansanm’s controlled Port-au-Prince: years of gang control have transformed the central downtown, leaving once-bustling streets overgrown, almost reclaimed by nature.

=== Suppression of the education ===
Between February and May 2024, members of Viv Ansanm vandalized and set fire to multiple academic facilities of the State University of Haiti, as well as the National School of Arts, among numerous other educational institutions. On 3 April 2024, the National Library of Haiti, in rue du Centre, Port-au-Prince, was looted by the gangs. Its director, Dangelo Neard, confirmed that the facility's furniture was stolen and its generator ransacked. More than 1,600 schools were closed between 2024 and 2025 because of gang violence. At least 331 schools were destroyed by gangs in Port-au-Prince, 47 destroyed in January 2025 alone.

== Military ==
Viv Ansanm is formed by the alliance between G9 and G-Pèp, the major gangs in Port-au-Prince once rivals, and other hundreds of armed gangs linked to the two majors. The coalition has between 12,000 and 20,000 bandits. Viv Ansanm also recruits children as new members. More than half of the total members of the gang coalition are child soldiers. The coalition is well-armed and capable of using unmanned aerial vehicles. They have access to a variety of illegal weapons, mostly from the United States, giving them more firepower than the police. Members routinely deploy Molotov cocktails and explosive devices during coordinated assaults on police stations, prisons, and government infrastructure. Despite a UN arms embargo, the coalition maintains steady pipelines of thousands of rounds of rifle and pistol ammunition to sustain prolonged gun battles, with an estimated arsenal of around 500,000 illegal weapons. During an attack, the Kraze Baryé gang demolished a police station, that have been abandoned as a protest after the killing of 6 police officers on another police station, using heavy machinery.

== Territorial control ==
=== Port-au-Prince ===
Since the second establishment of Viv Ansanm, Port-au-Prince has faced the consolidation of territorial control. In March 2024, Viv Ansanm, led by Jimmy Chérizier, tried to capture Toussaint Louverture International Airport in Port-au-Prince, which is the main International airport in Haiti. Besides the failling attempt to capture the airport, Viv Ansanm controlled 80% of Port-au-Prince in the same year and attack the suburb Pétion-Ville in November of that year. In September 2025 Viv Ansanm controlled 90% of Port-au-Prince. Viv Ansanm also tried to capture territory in the neighboring areas of Port-au-Prince. As of July and August 2026, Viv Ansanm still controls the majority of Port-au-Prince.

=== Artibonite ===
In late 2024, Viv Ansanm expanded into the Artibonite Department.

=== Centre department ===
In April 2025, Viv Ansanm took over the cities of Mirebalais and Saut-d'Eau.

=== Nord-Ouest department ===
On 18 September 2025, Bassin-Bleu was briefly captured by Viv Ansanm after an invasion, killing one civilian and injuring others. The city was later recaptured by the PNH.

=== Sud-Est department ===
On 13 April 2026, Viv Ansanm started an offensive in Macary and Seguin, mountainous localities in the Marigot commune, with coordinated attacks that killed 7 local youths, burned down a local police station and destroyed police vehicles.

== Infightings ==
On 8 December 2025, at least 49 people, of whom one by-stander, 10 child soldiers and 19 women, were killed in clashes between gangs in the Bel Air slum in Port-au-Prince. The clashes erupted for a dispute over kidnappings between Les Argentins and Krache Dife gangs. Dèdè, leader of the Krache Dife gang, was killed, and Kempès Sanon, leader of Les Argentins, was injured.

Between 9 an 11 May 2026, at least 78 people were killed in clashes between gangs in Cité Soleil and Croix-des-Bouquets. The gangs 400 Mawozo, Chèn Méchan and Taliban fought against the Pierre VI and Terre Noire gangs, both sides part of Viv Ansanm, over control of the strategic Plaine du Cul-de-Sac. Between 6 March and 31 July, at least 613 people were killed and 375 injured during internal gang wars in Viv Ansanm for Plaine du Cul-de-Sac.

== Relations ==
=== Gran Grif ===
Viv Ansanm is allied with Gran Grif, a gang which controls an important section of the Route Nationale 1 highway and has committed massacres in the near town of Pont-Sondé.

=== Relations with Haitian élite ===
On 2 December 2022 the Government of Canada imposed sanctions against Gilbert Bigio. The Canadian sanctions against Bigio were intended to stop the flow of illicit funds and weapons to armed criminal gangs in Haiti. Bigio was accused of supporting "illegal activities of armed criminal gangs, including through money laundering and other acts of corruption", according to a statement from the Canadian Minister of Foreign Affairs. On 17 November 2022, the Government of Canada imposed joint sanctions against Michel Martelly and former Prime Ministers Laurent Lamothe and Jean Henry Ceant. The sanctions were taken against Martelly on the basis of "gross and systematic human rights violations in Haiti." Specifically, Martelly is accused of supporting violent armed gangs in Haiti that terrorize the population. On 17 July 2025, businessman and former presidential candidate Reginald Boulos was arrested in the United States on charges of involvement with the Viv Ansanm gang.

== See also ==
- Greater Liberia
- Liberated Zone (Sierra Leone)
