= Viv Ansanm =

Hatian criminal organization (est. 2023)

- Founded: September 2023 (first time); 29 February 2024 (second time)
- Founder: Jimmy Chérizier
- Territory: Republic of Haiti (see territory of Viv Ansanm)
- Membership (est.): 12,000 to 20,000 (2026)
- Activities: Murder, kidnapping, robbery, extortion
- Allies: G9, G-Pèp and others
- Rivals: Haitian government Gang Suppression Force; Salvadoran Armed Forces

Viv Ansanm (Haitian Creole for 'live together') is a gang coalition based in the Port-au-Prince area that comprises the G9 and G-Pèp alliances. It was initially formed in September 2023 by the ex-police officer and warlord Jimmy "Barbecue" Chérizier. Viv Ansanm was formed in solidarity and as a response to the increasing pressure of the Haitian government and the UN Security Council's Gang Suppression Force.

Although their territorial stronghold is in the Port-au-Prince metropolitan area, Viv Ansanm has started expanding their influence further, to other communes in Ouest, Centre, and the Artibonite Valley.

== Formation ==
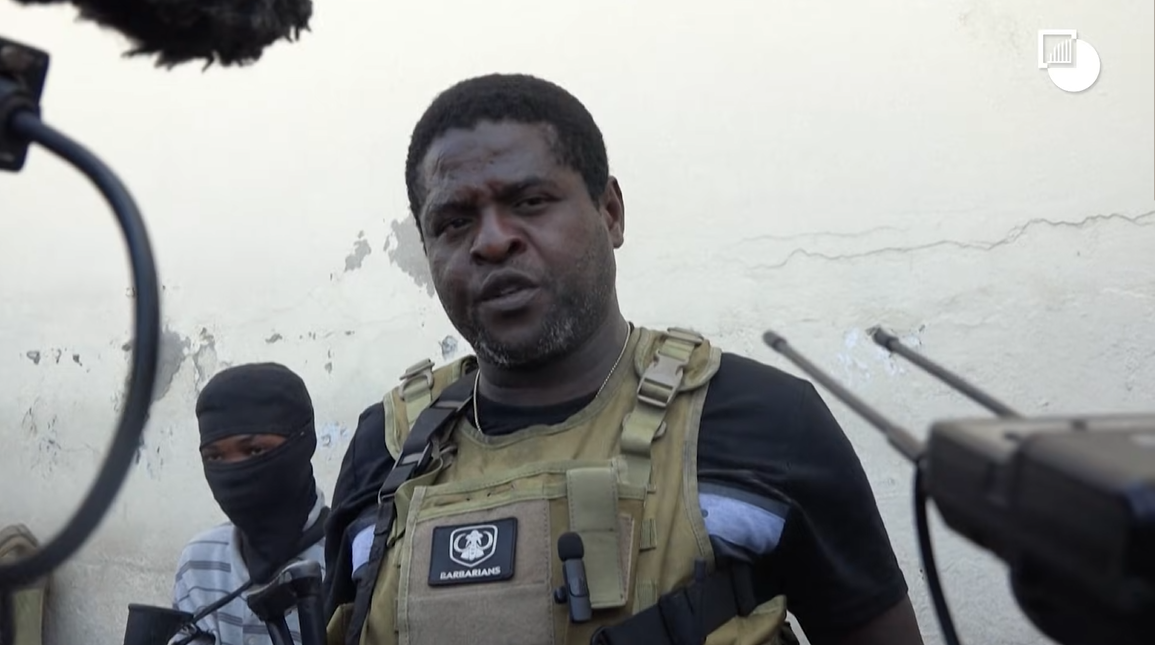
Jimmy Chérizier

Viv Ansanm was created in September 2023 by Jimmy Chérizier. The initial alliance fell through in a matter of weeks, but was revived in early 2024 by Chérizier again due to the Multinational Security Support (MSS) mission by the UN which was being rapidly deployed.

On 29 February 2024, after a short-lived attempt in September 2023, the Revolutionary Forces of the G9 Family and Allies united with the G-Pèp gangs to form Viv Ansanm. The move to create this alliance was pioneered by Jimmy Chérizier, who has been the spokesperson since its creation. Viv Ansanm controls around 80% of metropolitan Port-au-Prince, as well as many surrounding towns. Chérizier describes the Viv Ansanm movement as demanding dialogue with the Conille government, and that Viv Ansanm is in opposition to the Haitian and American oligarchs holding power over Haiti. In a June 2024 interview, Chérizier spoke regarding the Kenyan police operation in Haiti, saying that the "politicians and oligarchs ... [called in] assassins and mercenaries from Kenya on the pretext that they will crush the gangs and battle Viv Ansanm. They will fight. Viv Ansanm will fight. The Kenyans are protecting the interests of the American oligarchs ... That's why they brought them here." On 22 October, SOS Journalists and the Association of Haitian Journalists released statements calling upon authorities to take measures to protect journalists threatened by Viv Ansanm.

=== Resignation of Ariel Henry ===
In March 2024, Viv Ansanm carried out a prison break in Croix-des-Bouquets (after a previous one in 2021) and another at the National Penitentiary. They continued Viv Ansanm coalition took over Toussaint Louverture International Airport to prevent the prime minister at the time, Ariel Henry, from returning to Haiti. They were successful, as he resigned from the post later that month. Another motivation for their takeover of the airport was to prevent the arrival of the Multinational Security Support mission organized by the UN, now known as the Gang Suppression Force.

== Attacks ==
Between February and May 2024, members of Viv Ansanm vandalized and set fire to multiple academic facilities of the State University of Haiti, as well as the National School of Arts and the National Library of Port-au-Prince, among numerous other educational institutions.

On 15 March 2024, Viv Ansanm, together with civilians, looted a UNICEF humanitarian aid container containing supplies essential for children's survival. The closure of Port-au-Prince's main commercial port severely disrupted the supply chain for essential goods, resulting in shortages. Later, they destroyed Jude-Anne Hospital and looted Saint Martin Hospital and Health Center in the Delmas 18 neighborhood.

On 24 March 2024, Viv Ansanm launched a large-scale indiscriminate attack on several city blocks surrounding the National Palace. The objective of the attack was to clear the area and inflict as much damage as possible. Johnson André, leader of the 5 Segond gang, has been identified as one of the perpetrators of the attack.

On 25 March, gang members launched an attack on Haitian police and the Multinational Security Support (MSS) mission in the Artibonite region, killing a Kenyan police officer and destroying three MRAPs armored vehicles, two of the MSS and one of the Haitian police.

On 6 August 2024, two gangs belonging to Viv Ansanm, 5 Segonnd and Taliban gang, killed at least 10 people and burned several homes in the communes of Arcahaie and Cabaret north of Port-au-Prince. The attacks were most likely an attempt to expand their control along the Gulf of Gonâve coast.

On 15 September, a gang attack on an armored vehicle killed the driver and injures two police officers in Kenscoff.

Between 11 and 19 November 2024, Viv Ansanm gangs attacked several locations in the Port-au-Prince metropolitan area, including Pernier, Nazon, and Vivy Mitchel, in an attempt to invade Delmas and Pétion-Ville. The resulting violence left at least 220 people dead, 92 injured, and nearly 41,000 displaced.

Viv Ansanm reportedly massacred over 180 people in December 2024. In April 2025, Viv Ansanm stormed the police station and prison in Mirebalais, setting the buildings on fire and freeing around 500 prisoners.

Between 26 and 29 January 2025, Viv Ansanm launched multiple attacks in Kenscoff, south of Port-au-Prince in the department of Ouest, with the objective of taking control of the area and securing access to the country's southeast. An estimated 90 to 150 people were killed in the massacre. The violence also resulted in the destruction of more than 100 homes and the displacement of 3,139 people.

On 12 May 2025, a helicopter was targeted by gang members in the Carrefour Vincent area, where bandits opened fire on the aircraft as it flew overhead. Several bullets hit the helicopter, forcing it to crash a short distance away in the Bourdon neighborhood. There were no casualties. On 2 July UN assistant secretary-general Miroslav Jenča told the Security Council that Port-au-Prince has been "paralyzed by gangs" and warned that the "total collapse of state presence in the capital could become a very real scenario". Ghada Waly, the head of the UN Office on Drugs and Crime, said "As gang control expands, the state's capacity to govern is rapidly shrinking".

During 17 and 18 July 2025, nine civilians were killed by gang members in L'Estère, Artibonite, in retaliation for the killing of the gang's leader by a vigilante self-defense group. On 22 July, an ambush by the Gran Grif gang in Liancourt left at least three police officers dead and one missing. On 4 August, nine people were kidnapped from Sainte-Hélène orphanage in the commune of Kenscoff, Ouest. The attackers raided the facilities at around 3:30 am, kidnapping the nun, the minor and seven employees, in an act that has been described as premeditated. On 12 September, at least 42 people were killed following an attack by the Viv Ansanm gang on the village of Labodrie, Arcahaie.

On 23 September 2025, a drone attack in Cité Soleil killed 13 people, including eight children, and wounded six others, after the gang leader Albert (known as Djouma or “King Jouma”) was celebrating his birthday and distributing gifts there. Human rights organizations denounced that local police forces were behind the attack, using this method more regularly. On 13 November, seven gang members were killed during a Haitian police operation in Croix-des-Bouquets, Ouest, where officers destroyed a helicopter that made an emergency landing, to prevent its capture. On the same day there was an attack on the U.S. embassy in Haiti by gangs. On 18 November, Haiti would qualify for the 2026 World Cup, beating Nicaragua in Willemstad; due to the ongoing war and the invasion and vandalization of the Stade Sylvio Cator by the gangs, the national team was unable to host any matches in Haiti, instead playing all of its qualifying fixtures at neutral sites.

In December 2025, the Haitian National Police launched a sustained operation against gangs in Carrefour Aéroport, a major intersection in Port-au-Prince. The police station there, destroyed by gangs in March 2024, was reopened on 7 February 2026. On 8 December, at least 49 people were killed in clashes between gangs in Port-au-Prince.

On 14 January 2026, Haitian security forces targeted and destroyed three homes belonging to Jimmy Chérizier during a major military operation attempting to kill the gang leader using FPV drones; Chérizier survived.

== Expansion ==
As part of Viv Ansanm, the Gran Grif gang based in the Artibonite department of Haiti has also increased the scope of their attacks, despite already being known as one of Haiti's cruelest gangs. The level of violence in the department has risen sharply because of this, with local security forces in the region unprepared to respond. It has also seen an increase in the number of kidnappings and internally displaced persons, as kidnapping is one of Gran Grif's main activities. Many of the IDPs flee to Port-au-Prince.

On 3 October 2024, they attacked the town of Pont-Sondé, conducting a massacre, leaving at least 115 people dead, and at least 50 injured. and thousands more fleeing the town. On 29 April 2025, Gran Grif launched an attack on Petite-Rivière-de-l'Artibonite.

Between 29 March 2026 and 1 April 2026, at least 70 people have been killed and 30 injured during attacks by the Gran Grif gang against a vigilante group in the areas of Petite-Rivière, Jean-Denis, Pont-Sondé and Marchand-Dessalines in Artibonite region. Dozens of houses have been burned down and nearly 6,000 people were forced to flee. On 13 April, seven people were killed in an attack by gangs on Marigot.

On 11 June, gunmen abducted James Boyard, cabinet director of the Defense Ministry and concurrent inspector general of the Haitian National Police, in the Bourdon neighborhood of Port-au-Prince. On 7 August, an armored vehicle belonging to the Haitian National Police fell into an ambush set by Viv Ansanm’s gang members in Kenscoff, located on the heights of Port-au-Prince, injuring three policemen and burning their vehicle, also an unknown number of bandits was either injured or killed.

== Sanctions ==
The United States designated Viv Ansanm as a terrorist organization in October 2025. The Office of Foreign Assets Control has also sanctioned two members of Viv Ansanm, Dimitri Hérard and Kempes Sanon. Dimitri Hérard was the head of the National Palace Guard tasked with defending Haiti's head of state, who was implicating in the killing of Jovenel Moïse in 2021. He escaped from prison in 2024 and is suspected to have collaborated with Viv Ansanm. Sanon is the leader of the Bel Air gang.

== See also ==
- Haitian crisis (2018–present)
- Gang war in Haiti
- Timeline of gang-related events in Haiti
