= 2024 famine in Haiti =

Catastrophic food insecurity caused by gang war

- Country: Haiti
- Location: Port-au-Prince, Artibonite Valley, La Gonâve, La Grand’Anse, Croix des Bouquets, Cité Soleil, western Haiti
- Period: Food insecurity reported by IPC in March 2024; Famine officially declared on 30 September 2024 by the IPC
- Causes: Haitian crisis (2018–present) and resulting inflation; Gang wars in Haiti
- Effect on demographics: 5,636 in starvation; 5.4 million at Category 4 "crisis" levels of food insecurity

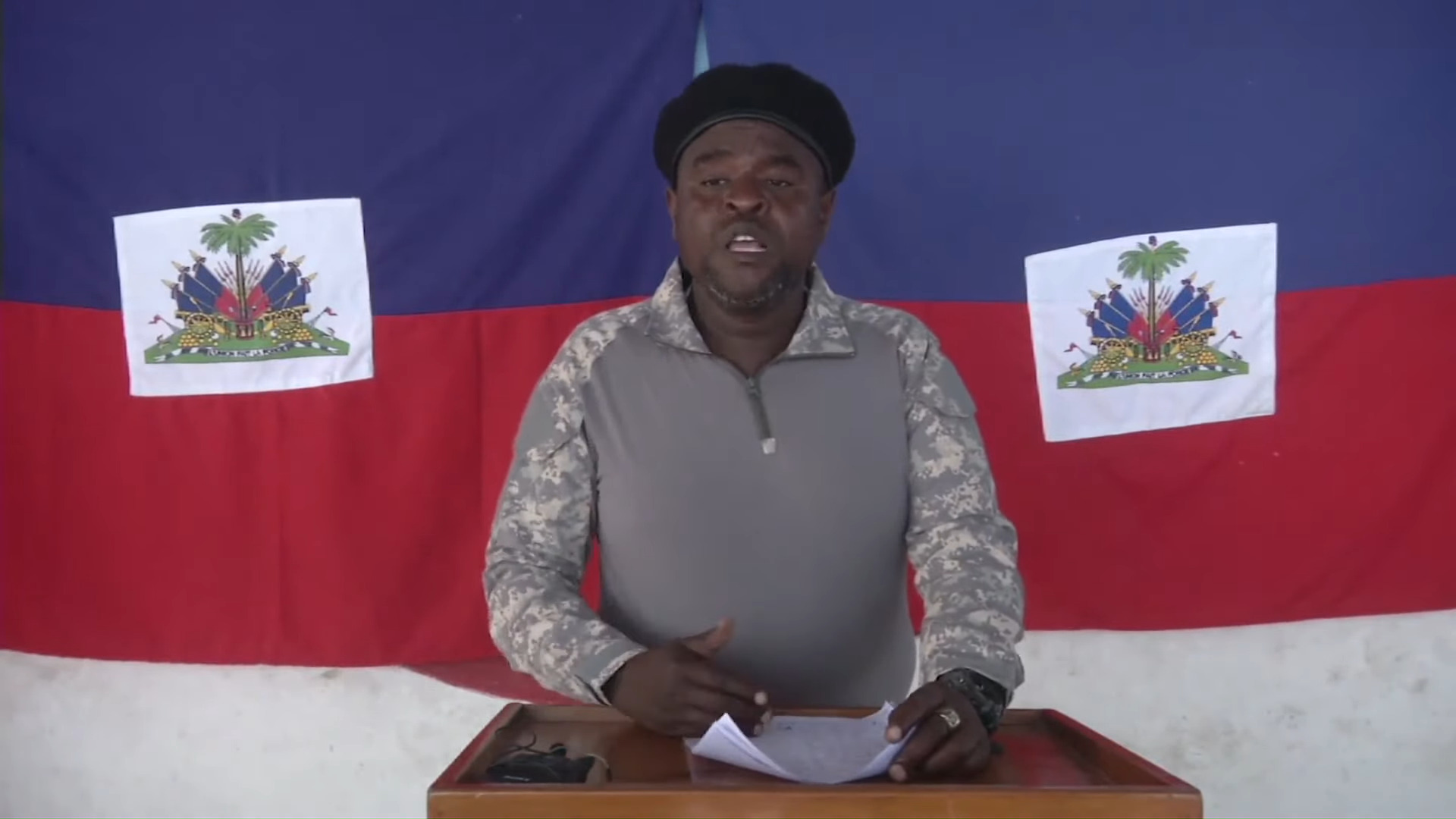
Jimmy Chérizier, leader of the G9 and Viv Ansanm gang coalitions

In 2024, famine conditions struck Haiti as a result of the ongoing Haitian crisis, resulting in a reported 5,636 people suffering from starvation and 5.4 million civilians— almost half of Haiti's population— suffering from "crisis levels of hunger or worse". While food insecurity was first noted in March 2024, a 30 September report released for the Integrated Food Security Phase Classification (IFSPC) officially declared the presence of famine in Haiti as a consequence of gang conflict preventing transport of food while also preventing civilians from being able to find food outside of their homes.

== Background ==
As of September 2023, reports indicated that approximately 80% of the Haitan capital of Port-au-Prince was under the control of gangs. The growing crisis has led to discussions of a potential 1,000 strong United Nations backed Kenyan-led police intervention into Haiti, which Kenya had previously offered but which Haiti was at first reluctant to accept. On 2 October 2023, United Nations Security Council resolution 2699 was approved, authorizing the "multinational security support mission" to Haiti. If such an intervention were to occur, it would be the first time an African Union country would lead a major peacekeeping operation outside of Africa. On 5 October 2023, Kenyan foreign minister Alfred Mutua was replaced by Musalia Mudavadi amid domestic controversy over the plans.

On 29 February 2024, a wave of violence broke out in the country—gunfire was directed at the country's main airport and many businesses in the area and two police stations were seized—fueling speculation that an alliance between rival gangs was forming to overthrow the government. Gang leader Jimmy Chérizier released a video saying that the goal of the operation was to prevent Henry from returning to Haiti. Chérizier was said to have the support of other gangs as part of a newly-formed "Viv Ansanm" ("live together") coalition; though that coalition was quick to dissolve, other gangs still launched attacks together with Chérizier's G9 gang. Gangs stormed jails after diversionary attacks on police stations, resulting in thousands of people being freed during the jailbreaks. As the security situation in Port-au-Prince deteriorated, on 3 March, interim prime minister Boisvert issued a state of emergency. More than 160,000 people were displaced within the metropolitan area of the capital, effectively under siege by armed groups. Looting at the main port put at risk 300 containers filled with lifesaving aid. With the Port-au-Prince airport shut down due to gang violence, Henry's chartered plane was prevented from landing in Santo Domingo and landed instead in San Juan, Puerto Rico, on 5 March. Under pressure from the gangs, protesters, and the international community, on 11 March, Ariel Henry announced his resignation.

== Causes ==
Armed gang violence resulted in the displacement of Haitians in addition to preventing supply chains from reaching areas controlled by gangs due to them blocking roads from humanitarian assistance. While the ongoing gang violence significantly disrupted supply chains and public security, two million Haitians suffering from hunger lived outside of gang violence-impacted areas. Causes for catastrophic food insecurity in these regions included significant inflation that reached a 30% increase for food by July 2024 as a consequence of political and economic instability, causing food to take up 70% of typical expenses for a household.

In addition, several regions were still suffering from the aftermath of numerous natural disasters, including a 7.2 magnitude earthquake in August 2021, Hurricane Matthew striking the nation as a Category 4 storm, and several periods of drought resulting in lower agricultural yields. More recently, Hurricane Beryl became the most severe storm to make landfall in Haiti as a Category 2 storm on 2 July 2024.

=== Gang activity ===
On 17 March, a UNICEF aid container carrying critical items for infants and mothers was looted in that port, in the context of a healthcare crisis where 60% of the hospitals are unable to operate nationally due to medical supply and fuel shortages.

By 19 March, rising prices became an issue, with agricultural products going to waste in warehouses. Problems of liquidity were affecting the banking sector in several areas while the health sector and public transportation were also disrupted. According to public transportation union leaders who painted a grim picture of kidnappings and merchandise seizures on the roads, armed gangs continued their nearly 3-year-long control of the national highway system, letting traffic pass only when they wanted to raise money. With the closure of the Port-au-Prince airport, the safest way of traveling to other Haitian cities disappeared, with traffic on the highways increasing as a result.

On 22 March, a police union representative said that officers in the capital were unable to cash their paychecks at the state bank. No ships had entered the container port since 5 March. According to Le Nouvelliste, gangs targeted the Artibonite Valley, causing it to become "one of the worst-hit areas" describing it as, "the country's bread basket—where gangs took possession of land and stole harvests".

== Impact ==
An Integrated Food Security Phase Classification (IFSPC) report released in March 2024 stated that roughly 4.97 million people were suffering from acute food insecurity or were at risk for food insecurity by June 2024. Of these, 1.64 million people were classified as suffering from "Emergency" IPC Phase 4 conditions, primarily situated in Haitian capital Port-au-Prince, the Artibonite Valley, La Gonâve, La Grand’Anse, Croix-des-Bouquets, Cité Soleil, and western Haiti.

A subsequent Integrated Food Security Phase Classification report released on 30 September 2024 stated that citizens in capital Port-au-Prince as well as in northern, southern, and central Haiti faced "urgent" levels of hunger. 5,636 people were reported to be in famine conditions (IPC Phase 5, its highest), described in the report as having no food or minimal food regardless of any efforts, leaving those affected to starve and die. 5.4 million civilians, representing almost half of Haiti's population, were reported to suffer from "crisis levels of hunger or worse", significantly increased from 2% of Haiti's population in 2014 suffering from food insecurity. Of these, 70% of civilians who were living in makeshift shelters were reported to suffered from crisis-level hunger or worse.

A Haitian mother interviewed by the Associated Press stated that large fights would break out when food arrived from humanitarian groups. Many women and girls, some only fifteen years old, were forced to engage in prostitution for food.

United Nations spokesperson Stéphane Dujarric stated that the Haitian famine represented: “one of the highest proportions of acutely food insecure people in any crisis around the world”. World Food Programme director for Haiti Jean-Martin Bauer referred to the famine as "the worst humanitarian crisis in Haiti since the 2010 earthquake".

== Response ==
Non-profit organization Mercy Corps worked to lower food insecurity in Haiti and rallied for further monetary support, stating that an additional US$230 million was needed to initiate programs to control the famine up to the end of the year. The World Food Programme provided humanitarian aid to about 1.35 million civilians.

On the same day of the IFSPC report on 30 September 2024, the United Nations issued an extension of its authorization of a Kenya-led multinational police mission of 2,500 personnel to take control of areas away from armed gangs.

== See also ==
- Mud cookie
- World food crises (2022–present)
- 2021–2023 global supply chain crisis
- 2021–2023 inflation surge
