= January 2023 Port-au-Prince police killings =

Gang killings in Haiti

- Part of the gang war in Haiti
- Location: Carrefour-Feuilles and Liancourt, Port-au-Prince, Haiti
- Date: January 10-26, 2023
- Target: Haitian National Police
- Deaths: 18
- Perpetrator: Gran Grif (per PNH)

Between January 10 and 26, 2023, eighteen police officers were killed by Gran Grif, a gang operating in Port-au-Prince. The killings sparked riots in Port-au-Prince by Haitian police officers and police-affiliated gang Fantom 509, along with international condemnation.

== Background ==
Since the government's de facto collapse in 2018, Haiti's capital of Port-au-Prince has become a hotbed of anarchic gang activity with brutal murders and spates of killing. This was exacerbated in 2021 by the assassination of Jovenel Moïse, leading most of the gangs in Port-au-Prince to ally with G9 or G-Pep. During Ariel Henry's administration, following the death of Moise, seventy-eight police officers had been killed.

== Killings ==
The first killing occurred on January 10, in the Carrefour-Feuilles neighborhood. Officers Denis Dempsey and Previlus Jean-Daddy were murdered by unknown perpetrators, and several other police officers were wounded in the attack. On January 17, a convoy of the National Police (PNH) came under attack by gang members, killing one and injuring one more. That same day, officer Joseph Jean Gardy was kidnapped. Five police officers were ambushed on January 20, with three of them dying in the attack. One more was kidnapped in the attack.

The largest ambush occurred at the Liancourt police station in Artibonite on January 26, when six police officers were ambushed by the Savien and Mowodwe factions of Gran Grif. The attack began at 7am, with a second attack occurring at 10am. A seventh police officer died shortly afterward. One police officer was killed in Delmas 52 the following day. The PNH stated that Gran Grif still has the bodies of those killed. Videos from AP showed gang members with the dismembered bodies of the officers.

== Protests ==
Protests and riots broke out on January 26 by Haitian police officers and members of Fantom 509, affiliated with the police. The protesters called for the resignation of Henry, some calling for a revolution, and for a crackdown on the gangs. American ambassador to Haiti Brian A. Nichols condemned the killings. Around the time of the protests, unelected Prime Minister Ariel Henry was arriving back in Haiti from a meeting in Miami, Florida. Protesters broke into Toussaint Louverture International Airport searching for him, but he was in another section of the airport. Meanwhile, protesters also broke into Henry's residence in reprisal for the attacks.

The director of the union of the PNH stated that the January attacks were the largest instance of attacks against Haitian police, stating "police officers are being hunted by the gangs."
