= Cité Soleil massacre =

The Cité Soleil massacre may refer to:

- July 2005 United Nations assault on Cité Soleil, which targeted armed rebels and killed between five and 80 people.
- 2024 Cité Soleil massacre, where a gang targeting Vodou practitioners killed at least 184 people.
