= Ti Greg =

Haitian gang leader (died 2024)

- An undated photograph of Ti Greg
- Born: Ernst Julme
- Died: 22 March 2024; Pétion-Ville, Haiti
- Cause of death: Gunshot wound
- Known for: Leader of the Delmas 95 gang

Ernst Julmé, known by his alias Ti Greg ("Little Greg" in Haitian Creole), was a Haitian gang leader. He was the head of the Delmas 95 gang active in the Delmas and Pétion-Ville suburbs of Port-au-Prince. Before his life of crime, he was an officer of the Haitian National Police (PNH).

The PNH arrested Ti Greg in Pétion-Ville in 2021, but he escaped custody amid a prison break in 2024. A few weeks after his escape, Ti Greg was shot and killed by police in an operation targeting his gang.

== Biography ==
Ti Greg was an officer of the Haitian National Police (PNH) before becoming a gang member.

Specialized units of the PNH, including the Departmental Operation and Intervention Brigade, arrested Ti Greg and two other gang members on 7 October 2021, during an evening operation in Pétion-Ville and northern Delmas. Ti Greg was travelling in an unlicensed car, while his two accomplices were on motorcycles. He reportedly attempted to pass himself off as a police officer. The authorities accused Ti Greg of being the leader of the local Delmas 95 gang and committing "several acts of banditry" in the area. Delmas 95 is a member of the Viv Ansanm alliance of gangs, and as such Ti Greg was affiliated its leader, Jimmy "Barbecue" Chérizier.

Ti Greg escaped custody during a storming of his prison by gangs on 3 March 2024. Later that month, on 22 March, he was shot and killed by police in a special operation against Delmas 95 in Pétion-Ville. Ti Greg had attacked police over several days as they attempted to apprehend him. The previous day, Makandal, another prominent gang leader, was killed by vigilantes.
