= 2025 Haiti orphanage kidnapping =

Kidnapping in Haiti

The 2025 Haiti orphanage kidnapping took place on August 3, 2025, around 15:30 local time, as attackers broke into the privately run Sainte-Hélène orphanage, located next to Haiti's capital, Port-au-Prince. The orphanage is run by Irish missionary Gena Heraty, who was kidnapped along with a 3-year-old child with disabilities and 7 other employees including a nurse. They were released almost a month later.

== Background ==
The orphanage in Haiti is managed by "Our little brothers and sisters" organization and is home to about 270 children, many of them with disabilities. Gena Heraty who in 2010 won the Rehab People of the Year Awards, was born in County Mayo, Ireland, and served as head of the children with reduced mobility wing since 1993. In 2013 during a robbery attempt of the orphanage, she was brutally assaulted as one member was killed.

== Kidnapping ==
According to reports the attackers broke through the wall, kidnapped 9 employees and ran away. The act was described by acting Mayor of Kenscoff: "The kidnappers entered without firing a single shot, after breaching the orphanage's perimeter wall, and kidnapped the staff there, then left with their hostages [...]".

The kidnapping was another event in an escalating gang violence crisis in Haiti. UN reports confirmed that over 3,100 people were killed between January and June 2025. During that time period around 350 kidnapping cases were recorded, with the highest numbers between April and June 2025, accounting for 175-185 cases. The attacks were carried out by gangs in Grand Ravine and Village de Dieu who are part of the Viv Ansanm group that was declared as a terrorist organization by the U.S. in May of 2025.

Irish Deputy Prime Minister Simon Harris condemned the kidnapping, saying it is "deeply worrying" and confirmed high-level diplomatic engagement. UNICEF along with Haiti's Institute of Social Welfare and Research worked to relocate survivors and safeguard dozens of children and staff from the orphanage.

== Release ==
After almost a month in captivity, Gena Heraty, 7 other employees and the 3-year-old child with disabilities were released on August 29, 2025. They were taken to receive medical treatment and later reunited with their families. Harris said he is delighted and welcomes the good news about their release and relieved. The Irish government stated that it did not pay ransom for the hostages.

== See also ==
- Crime in Haiti
