= 2021 Croix-des-Bouquets jailbreak =

Prison escape in Haiti

- Part of the Haitian conflict
- Location: Croix-des-Bouquets, Ouest, Haiti
- Date: 25 February 2021
- Attack type: Mass shooting, jailbreak
- Deaths: 26
- Injuries: Several

On 25 February 2021, hundreds of inmates escaped from the prison in which they were detained in Croix-des-Bouquets, Ouest, Haiti.

== Events ==
A riot began at the prison in Croix-des-Bouquets, a commune in the Ouest department of Haiti. More than 400 prisoners escaped during the jailbreak. During the fight, eight people died at the scene, including Paul Hector Joseph, the prison's director. After escaping, a number of fugitives opened fire in the streets, killing several civilians in the prison's nearby streets and around the entire city. Gunfights between local authorities and inmates then erupted, resulting in the death of some officers. Notable and powerful gang leader Arnel Joseph also escaped from the jail. He fled with an accomplice in a car, but was then found by police, and a gunfight followed. Joseph was shot dead and declared dead at the scene, while his accomplice, who was driving the vehicle, was wounded but fled the scene.
