= Secretary to the President =

Secretary to the President or Secretary-General to the President may refer to:

- Secretary to the President of Sri Lanka
- Secretary to the President of the United States
- Secretary-General to the President (Ireland)
- Secretary-General to the President (Republic of China)
- Secretary-General to the Presidency (Syria)

== See also ==
- Chief of Staff to the Prime Minister (disambiguation)
- Principal Secretary (disambiguation)
