= Miroslav Jenča =

Slovak diplomat

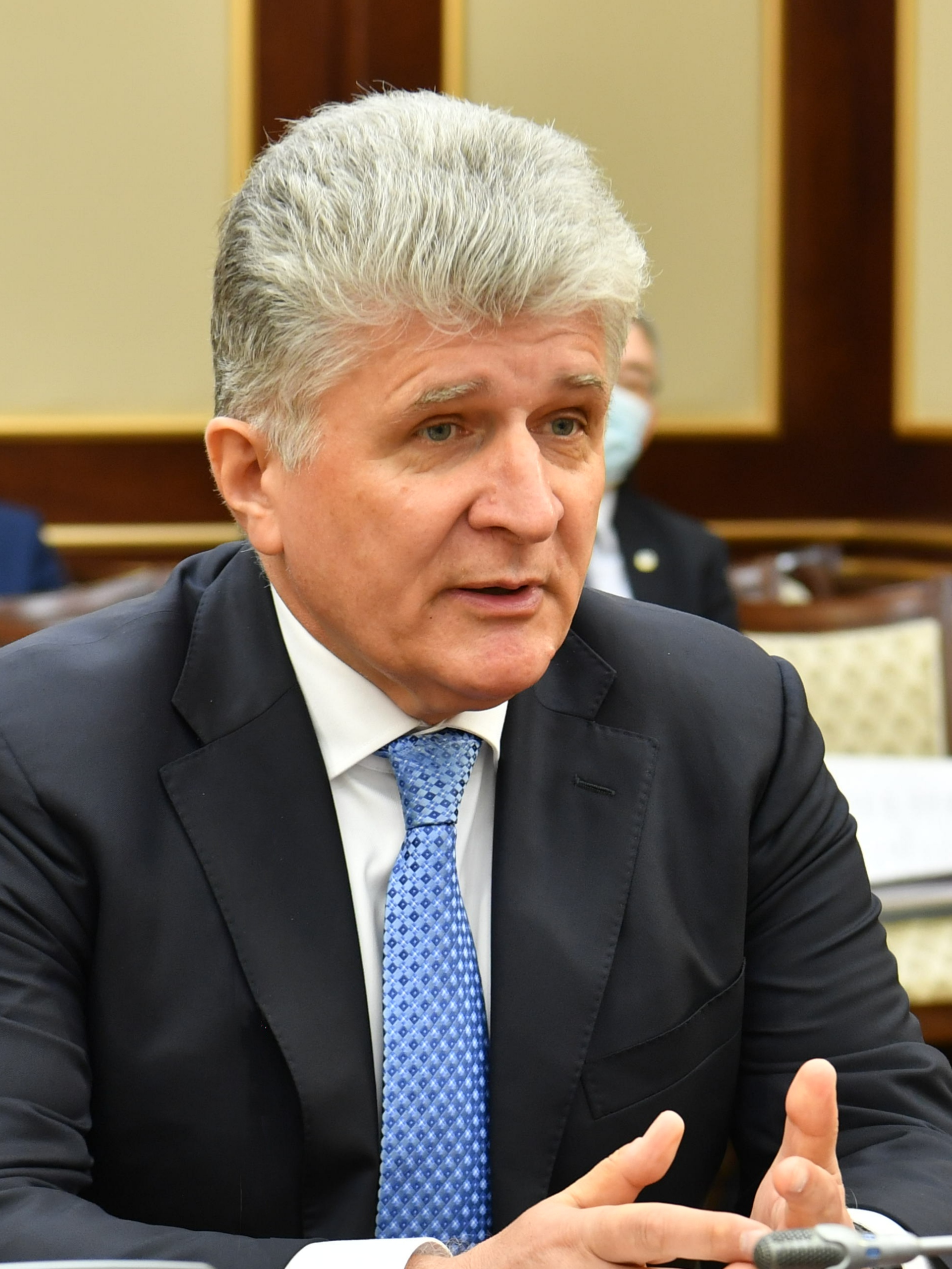
- Jenča in 2023

Miroslav Jenča is a Slovak diplomat who has been serving as United Nations Secretary-General António Guterres' Special Representative for Colombia and Head of the United Nations Verification Mission in Colombia since 2025.

== Education ==
Jenča studied at the University of Economics in Bratislava, Moscow State Institute of International Relations in Russia, and the Hoover Institution in the United States. He also holds a Doctor of Laws degree from Comenius University.

== Career ==
Jenča served as an ambassador of Slovakia to Mexico in 2000. Between 2004 and 2007 he led the Organization for Security and Co-operation in Europe Center in Tashkent (Uzbekistan). He held the position also during the Andijan massacre in 2005.

Based on his previous experience in Central Asia gained during his stay in Tashkent, in 2008 UN Secretary-General Ban Ki-moon appointed Jenča Special Representative of the Secretary-General and Head of the newly established United Nations Regional Center for Preventive Diplomacy for Central Asia, UNRCCA.

From 2019 to 2025 Jenča served as Assistant Secretary-General for Europe, Central Asia and the Americas in the United Nations Department of Political Affairs. On 8 September 2025 he was appointed Special Representative for Colombia and Head of the United Nations Verification Mission in Colombia.

== Sources ==
- "OSCE Project Co-ordinator in Uzbekistan | OSCE". osce.org.
- "SME.sk – Šéf OSN Pan Ki-mun si vybral Slováka". sme.sk.
- "Ministerstvo zahraničných vecí a európskych záležitostí Slovenskej republiky". mzv.sk.
- "The United Nations Regional Centre for Preventive Diplomacy for Central Asia". unrcca.unmissions.org.
