= Labodrie massacre =

2025 attack on a Haitian village by armed gangs

- Part of Haitian crisis (2018-present)
- Location: Labodrie, Haiti
- Date: 11-12 September 2025
- Deaths: at least 50
- Perpetrator: Viv Ansanm gang

The Labodrie massacre was a mass killing that occurred on the night of 11 September 2025 when armed gangs attacked the village of Labodrie in the Arcahaie commune north of Port-au-Prince, Haiti, reportedly in retaliation for the death of a member affiliated with the gang alliance of Viv Ansanm.

On the night of 11 September 2025, armed members of the Viv Ansanm gang entered Labodrie and began shooting indiscriminately, they then set the entire village on fire. According to reports from Haitian and international media, at least 50 people were killed. Victims reportedly included women, children and the elderly.

== Aftermath ==
The United Nations Secretary-General and Amnesty International have condemned the killings, calling for the perpetrators to be brought to justice.

Reports indicated that many victims remained unaccounted for days after the attack, while the Haitian national police have declined to comment publicly on the killings.
