= 2024 Cité Soleil massacre =

Killings by a gang in Port-au-Prince, Haiti

Coordinates: 18.578°N 72.335°W

- Part of gang war in Haiti
- Location: Cité Soleil, Port-au-Prince, Haiti
- Date: December 6–7, 2024
- Target: Elderly practitioners of Haitian Vodou
- Attack type: Stabbing
- Weapons: Machetes, knives, firearms
- Deaths: 207
- Perpetrator: Wharf Jeremie gang

The 2024 Cité Soleil massacre took place on 6 and 7 December 2024, in the commune of Cité Soleil in Port-au-Prince, Haiti. This massacre was perpetrated by the Wharf Jeremie gang, leaving at least 207 people dead according to the United Nations. Elderly Haitian Vodou practitioners were the primary targets.

The death toll of 207 made this massacre the most deadly gang incident in Haiti in 2024.

== Attack ==
According to the National Human Rights Defense Network (RNDDH), Monel "Mikano" Felix, leader of the Wharf Jeremie gang, ordered the attack on elderly practitioners of Haitian Vodou after a Vodou priest blamed the terminal illness of Felix's son on witchcraft conducted in the slum of Cité Soleil. On Friday, 6 December 2024, gang members affiliated with Felix killed at least 60 people, and more than 50 more were killed the following day when Felix's child died. The killings were carried out with machetes, other knives, and firearms. At least 127 of the victims were elderly (over 60 years of age), and local witnesses attested that some younger people who attempted to intervene were also killed.

International news of the massacre did not emerge until 8 December 2024, which RNDDH blamed on heavily restricted internet access in gang-controlled areas of Port-au-Prince.

== Responses ==
The Haitian government called the massacre an act of "unbearable cruelty". The prime minister's office promised to "mobilize all forces to track down and annihilate" the responsible parties. UN Secretary-General Antonio Guterres called on the government to "conduct a thorough investigation and ensure that perpetrators of these and all other human rights abuses and violations are brought to justice".

== See also ==
- 2024 Pont-Sondé attack
