= Gran Grif =

Haitian gang

- Founded: 2016
- Years active: 2016–present
- Territory: Artibonite, Haiti
- Ethnicity: Haitian
- Leader: Prophane Victor
- Activities: Massacres, violence, kidnapping, extortion, sexual violence, arms trafficking, forced recruitment
- Allies: Viv Ansanm (G-Pèp and G9)
- Rivals: Ti Mepri

Gran Grif (French: Grande Griffe; 'big claw') is the largest and most powerful criminal organization in the Artibonite department of Haiti. Based in Savien, in the commune of Petite-Rivière-de-l'Artibonite, they are notorious for their violent abuses against the civilian population.

In 2022, Gran Grif was found responsible for 80% of reported civilian deaths in Artibonite. The group systematically practices murder, rape, mass abduction and the forced recruitment of children, making them one of Haiti's cruelest gangs.

== History ==
Gran Grif was founded around 2016 by former congressman Prophane Victor to consolidate his electoral influence in the region. The name Gran Grif means 'Big Claw' in Haitian Creole. It was initially created as a local force to secure its founder's political power in the Petite-Rivière-de-l'Artibonite area. Under the leadership of Luckson Élan, the gang became the most powerful criminal organization in the department, engaging in massacres, kidnappings, and sexual violence. Both Victor and Élan have also been sanctioned by the United States in September 2024 and by the United Nations Security Council.

Between October 2023 and January 2024, nine mass kidnappings were attributed to Gran Grif. On 3 October 2024, the gang perpetrated the 2024 Pont-Sondé attack, which left at least 115 people dead and at least 50 injured. On 29 April 2025, Gran Grif launched an attack on Petite-Rivière-de-l'Artibonite.

=== Designation as a terrorist organization ===
On 27 February 2025, the Dominican Republic designated Gran Grif as a terrorist organization, followed by the United States on 2 May.

== See also ==
- Viv Ansanm
