= Gang Suppression Force =

International security force in Haiti since 2024

- Force de Répression des Gangs
- Logo of the GSF
- Active: 1 January 2024—2 October 2025 (MSS); 2 October 2025—present (GSF)
- Allegiance: United Nations Security Council
- Type: Multinational force
- Role: International police and military force
- Size: 1,398
- Garrison/HQ: LSA 2, Port-au-Prince, Haiti
- Engagements: Gang war in Haiti
- Website: gangsuppressionforce.org

Commanders
- Force Commander: (Mongolia) Major General Erdenebat Batsuuri (Mongolian Army)
- Deputy Force Commander: (Jamaica) Brigadier E. C. Clarke (JDF)

The Gang Suppression Force (GSF), previously the Multinational Security Support Mission (MSS), is an international police and military force approved by the United Nations Security Council on 2 October 2023 to assist the government of Haiti in restoring law and order amid worsening civil strife and gang violence since 2018.

The MSS mission was led by Kenya and coordinated with the Haitian National Police; although it is endorsed by the UNSC, it is not a United Nations operation. Personnel have been pledged by Caribbean Community members Jamaica, Bahamas, Guyana, Barbados, and Antigua and Barbuda, as well as Bangladesh, Benin, and Chad. Then-Kenyan Foreign Minister Alfred Mutua stated that Spain, Senegal, and Chile would likely deploy security personnel. The first contingent of the security force arrived in Haiti on 25 June 2024.

In October 2025, the United Nations Security Council adopted Resolution 2793, which transformed the MSS into the Gang Suppression Force (GSF), intended to contain 5,500 personnel. The GSF, unlike the MSS, will be working in coordination with both the Haitian National Police and the Armed Forces of Haiti (AFH). In June 2026, the Gang Suppression Force submitted a proposal to the UN Security Council requesting to extend their mandate through September 2028.

== Background ==
Haiti's government collapsed after the July 2021 assassination of President Jovenel Moïse, after which the prime minister, Ariel Henry, assumed power without an election. Though Henry's official term ended in early 2022, he postponed elections and governed without a constitutional mandate. The political impasse has created conditions for escalating gang warfare and a wave of violent crime. The following year he repeatedly called for an international intervention to counter growing armed gang violence in Haiti.

Since 2021, the Haitian National Police (HNP) has suffered 100 fatalities and declined by over 7,000 personnel; by the end of 2023, only around 9,000 officers remained on duty for country of over 11 million—for comparison, 36,000 officers serve the 8 million residents of New York City alone. These challenges have been exacerbated by a cholera outbreak, deadly earthquakes, and economic strife, contributing to a broader humanitarian crisis. According to a UN report, there were almost 2,800 murders recorded between October 2022 and June 2023. During 2023 self-defense militias had killed more criminals than the police. In March 2024, Ariel Henry resigned.

Haiti has previously been subject to international policing missions. U.S. troops and U.N. civilian police conducted patrols in the mid-1990s when the Haitian police was just being established. From 2004 to 2017, the U.N. Stabilization Mission in Haiti (MINUSTAH) undertook broad security duties that included an armed anti-gang campaign; it was replaced by a much smaller police force, the United Nations Mission for Justice Support in Haiti (MINUJUSTH), which concluded in 2019. Both missions were marred by controversies, including allegations of U.N. troops sexually exploiting poor women and being responsible for the cholera outbreak in 2010.

=== UNSC Resolution 2699 ===
UN Security Council Resolution 2699
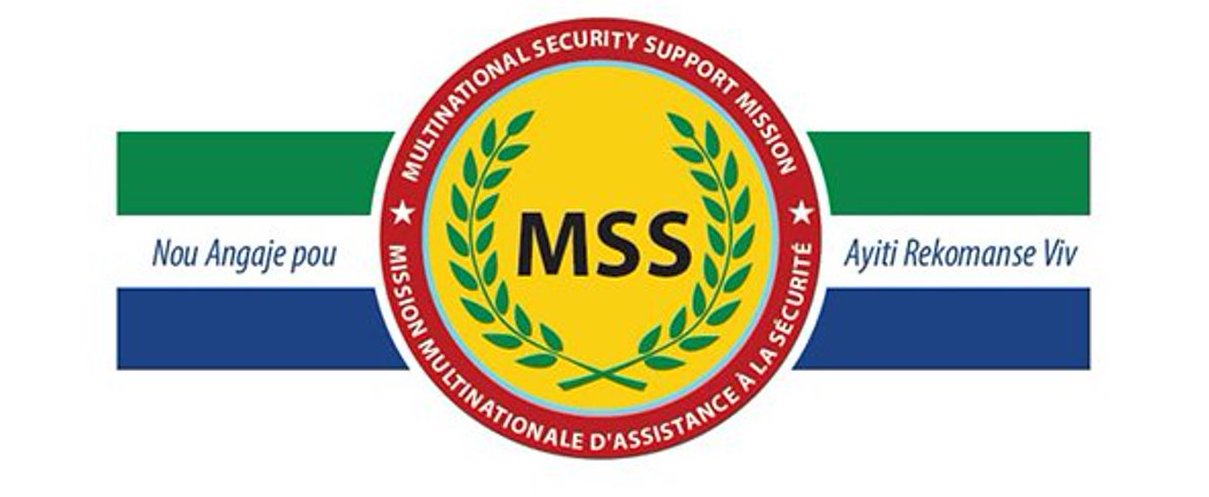
- Date: 2 October 2023
- Meeting no.: 9,430
- Code: S/RES/2699 (Document)
- Subject: Haitian crisis and Haitian conflict
- Voting summary: 13 voted for; None voted against; 2 abstained
- Result: Adopted

Security Council composition
- Permanent members: China; France; Russia; United Kingdom; United States
- Non-permanent members: Albania; Brazil; Ecuador; Gabon; Ghana; Japan; Malta; Mozambique; Switzerland; United Arab Emirates

One year after the Haitian government's formal request to the U.N. for international assistance, the United States and Ecuador drafted United Nations Security Council Resolution 2699. Adopted on 2 October 2023, the resolution mandates the MSS with helping the HNP counter gangs, restore security, and create conditions for free and fair elections. It also grants the MSS temporary executive policing authority in Haiti, including the powers of detention and arrest. Additionally, the resolution also extended a previous arms embargo. Thirteen members voted in favour, with Russia and China abstaining.

According to Le Monde, the controversial history of past United Nations interventions in Haiti and widespread opposition to American involvement led Washington to propose a new model: a multinational force led by an African country. Victoria Nuland, U.S. Under Secretary of State for Political Affairs, stated that "ten to twelve countries," will participate in the mission, with the United States providing logistical, financial, and medical support.

In February 2024, conferences in Brazil and Guyana regarding the mission were followed by additional commitments by various countries; the United States announced it would contribute another $100 million in support of the mission, raising its total pledge to $300 million, while Benin pledged to provide 2,000 soldiers. As of 30 September 2024, Kenya, Jamaica, the Bahamas, Antigua and Barbuda, Bangladesh, Benin, Chad, and Guinea have formally agreed to provide personnel. Prior to deployment, the MSS is required to present an operational plan to the U.N. Security Council and create an oversight mechanism to monitor the mission; participating personnel would also be subject to U.N. vetting. Additionally, personnel receiving U.S. support would be subject to U.S. human rights vetting pursuant to the "Leahy Laws".

=== Preparations ===
The United States has pledged $200 million to the mission and an additional $100 million in humanitarian aid. Canada announced $123 million to support Haiti, including $80.5 million for the mission. During March 2024, the U.N. indicated that $78 million had been formally pledged, of which only $10.8 million was deposited, by Canada and France. As of October 2024, operation has received only $85 million, while its annual budget is estimated at $600 million.

On 30 March 2024, 70 Canadian soldiers from the 1st Battalion, Royal 22e Régiment were deployed to Jamaica to provide training and support to Caribbean Community (CARICOM) nations heading to Haiti under MSS command.

On 20 May 2024, Toussaint Louverture International Airport in the capital of Haiti was reopened after being closed for three months. The US military was flying in supplies and civilian contractors in the preceding weeks to pave a way for the intervention.

On 23 May 2024, in recognition of its willingness to lead the mission, US President Joe Biden announced that Kenya will be granted a Major non-NATO ally status.

On 25 February 2025, UN Secretary-General Antonio Guterres said that the MSS will not transition to a UN peacekeeping force and instead, will recommend the creation of a support mission to back the MSS' operations.

== Deployment ==
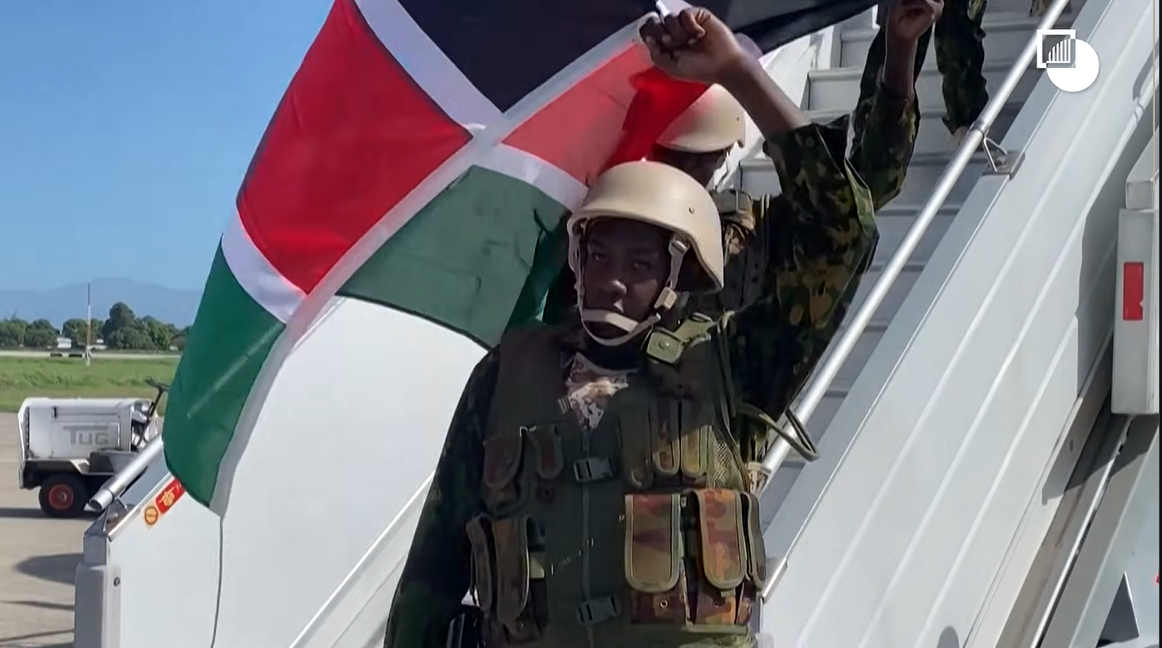
GSF Kenyan police unit arriving in Port-au-Prince, 2025

On 25 June 2024, Kenya's first contingent of 400 elite police officers landed in Port-au-Prince's international airport after months of delay. A second contingent consisting of 200 officers arrived on 16 July. On 12 September 2024, two dozen soldiers and police officers from Jamaica arrived in Haiti to join a U.N.-backed mission led by Kenya to combat the gangs.

Three months into the Multinational Security Support (MSS) mission, little progress has been made, with no tangible improvement in Haiti's security situation. As of late October 2024, the mission remains severely understaffed, with Kenya deploying only 400 troops, alongside 20 officers from Jamaica and Belize. Kenyan President William Ruto has pledged that the full deployment of Kenya Police personnel will be completed "by January" 2025, but he has criticized the mission's "lack of equipment, logistics, and funds." Additionally, observers have expressed concerns over the mission's unclear operational framework and rules of engagement.

Haitian National Police and MSS forces carry out joint patrols in Port-au-Prince, which is largely under the control of armed gangs.

Six soldiers of the Royal Bahamas Defence Force (from an initially promised 150) were deployed on 18 October 2024. Then on 3 January 2025, 75 troops of the Guatemalan Army Military police and 8 airmen of the Salvadoran Air Force landed in Port-au-Prince. Seventy-five additional troops of the Guatemalan Army military police unit landed the next day, completing Guatemala's deployment of pledged troops. The third deployment of Kenyan police officers, 217 officers this time, occurred on 18 January 2025. On the same day that 70 Salvadorans were deployed to the theatre, the U.N. announced that U.S. froze its funding of the mission. In November 2025, it was reported that the Roshel Senators used by the MSS were leased out to Haitian police. In 2026, Chad will deploy 750 members of the security forces to take part in the UN-backed security mission in Haiti.

=== Transition to GSF ===
In October 2025, United Nations Security Council adopted Resolution 2793 co-penned by the United States and Panama, to transform the MSS it into the Gang Suppression Force (GSF) initially planned to contain 5,500 personnel. The GSF will have the capability to conduct intelligence based operations either independently or in coordination with the Armed Forces of Haiti and Haitian National Police.

On 1 April 2026, the first GSF troops from Chad arrived in Haiti, consisting of 400 troops from the Chadian National Army. Two Chadian battalions, for 1,500 troops total, are expected to be deployed. They are stationed at the Vertières military base of the Haitian Armed Forces.

== Response ==
=== Haiti ===
In a 2023 survey, 70% of Haitians said they favor the deployment of an international armed force to fight the gangs, as authorized by the United Nations. The majority of respondents, 57%, said they do not think a coalition of civil society organizations that have come together under the name Montana Accord — an agreement for governing Haiti named after the Petionville hotel where it was signed — can solve the security crisis either. A total of 1,597 Haitians were surveyed across Haiti's 10 regional departments and the margin of error is below 3%. The poll was commissioned by the Haiti Health Network, a group of medical organizations in the country.

Nou Pap Konplis, a nongovernmental organization, expressed support for the resolution but urged the government to draft a "roadmap" that would avoid the problems of past interventions. Likewise, Ricardo Fleuridor, a leading activist and member of the Petrochallengers grassroots movement, called on U.N. leaders to collaborate with competent Haitians skilled in international politics and diplomacy when establishing a roadmap for the multinational mission. Lastly, Crisis Group expert Diego Da Rin observes that Haitians hope the force will enhance security and restore normalcy, but concerns about gang resistance mean its success hinges on the effectiveness of its initial operations. Echoing the concerns of Haitian civil society, human rights experts have advocated additional training and mechanisms to prevent and punish human rights violations, which have historically plagued prior peacekeeping and security missions.

On 17 April 2024, Haitian business leaders released a letter addressed to Kenyan President William Ruto stating that they were "extremely concerned" over the MSS' delay.

With the lack of action on the ground and lack of participation in operation, a growing number of Haitians have shown their mistrust in the objectives of the mission and are calling for investments in the Haitian police and Armed Forces of Haiti to resolve the security issues.

=== United States ===
As the United Nations sanctions an independent Kenya-led multinational mission to the tumultuous nation of Haiti, Sir Ronald Sanders, Antigua and Barbuda's chief diplomat to the Organisation of American States (OAS), has probed the role of the US in the endeavor. While the US State Department has committed to providing $100 million in foreign assistance and the Department of Defense is willing to offer up to $100 million in supporting measures, Sir Ronald Sanders underscores a deeper historical connection. As discussions about the Haitian mission proceed, Sanders calls for a more active role by the US, challenging the emphasis on monetary contributions over direct involvement.

=== Kenya ===
Nominated Senator Karen Nyamu asserts that Kenya's leadership in the UN-backed mission in Haiti will bolster its global reputation as a dependable partner. Highlighting Kenya's peacekeeping history, she believes that the mission provides advanced training for Kenyan police and brings financial benefits, with countries like the US committing significant funds. Rather than combat, Kenyan officers will secure key infrastructures in Haiti. Nyamu emphasizes Kenya's commitment to global collaboration and Haiti's stabilization.

Kenya's paramilitary General Service Unit may be deployed and some officers are learning French to communicate on the ground.

== Personnel ==
As of 2026, 1,398 personnel were deployed in Haiti, which include 150 Guatemalans, 78 Salvadorans, 23 Jamaicans, six Bahamians and two Belizeans. Kenyan Police ends its mission in 2026. Bangladesh and Sri Lanka began deploying troops in October 2026.

Country	Total (per country)	Personnel Breakdown	Ref
Bahamas	6	6 soldiers (Royal Bahamas Defence Force); Last personnel rotation on 1 May 2025.	
Bangladesh	50	As of October 2026, 50 soldiers and officers (Bangladesh Army) have been deployed.	
Belize	2	2 soldiers (Belize Defence Force)	
El Salvador	78	78 airmen (Salvadoran Air Force)	
Guatemala	150	150 military police (Guatemalan Army)	
Jamaica	23	18 soldiers (Jamaica Defence Force); 5 police officers (Jamaica Constabulary Force); Last personnel rotation on 15 April 2025.	
Sri Lanka	1,089	900 Sri Lanka Army personnel; 189 specialized police officers (Special Task Force)	
Total	1,398		

=== Commanders ===
Commander	Service	Term of Office	Deputy Commander	Service	Term of Office
(Kenya) Senior Assistant Inspector-General Godfrey Otunge	Kenya Police	May 2024–September 2025 (MSSM) October 2025–April 2026 (GSF)	(1) (Jamaica) Colonel Kevron Henry (2) (Jamaica) Colonel Eldon Morgan	Jamaica Defence Force	(1) September 2024–April 2025(2) April 2025–April 2026
(Mongolia) Major General Erdenebat Batsuuri	Mongolian Army	April 2026–present	(1) (Jamaica) Colonel Eldon Morgan (2) (Jamaica) Brigadier E. C. Clarke	Jamaica Defence Force	(1) April 2026–June 2026 (2) June 2026–present

== Analysis ==
In June 2025, a year after their deployment, Kenyan President William Ruto declared that the MSS made little progress in fighting the gangs. Less than half of the initially proposed 2,500 personnel were deployed, only 30% of the proposed equipment was delivered, and the number of displaced people from the time of deployment rose from 520,000 to 1.1 million after one year.

According to a statement by International Crisis Group, a Belgium-based think tank, the MSS has been an overall failure with a few isolated achievements. Despite retaking a few streets, they couldn't establish control over them nor could they retake any major gang territory. They also couldn't kill or capture any gang leaders. According to Chatham House, the MSS found itself outgunned and its members spent much of their time in their barracks.

== Casualties ==
On 24 February 2025, the Mission suffered its first casualty when a Kenyan Police officer, Samuel Tompei Kaetuai, was killed in a gunfight with gangs while assisting Haitian Police.

On 18 March 2025, a Kenyan police officer was injured after sustaining injuries in a security operation in the Kenscoff, Belot area.

On 25 March 2025, gangs ambushed a Kenyan contingent while on a recovery mission which killed one Kenyan Police officer and torched three armored vehicles. Another Kenyan police officer was also reported to be missing after the incident and gangs claimed to have killed and was later confirmed by the Security forces.

On 1 September 2025, an accident involving two armored vehicles killed a Kenyan police officer and injured eight other officers.

On 18 October 2026, four Salvadoran Air Force aviation technicians of the UN-backed GSF were taken hostage after an ambush by gangs on their armored vehicle in Croix-des-Bouquets, destroying their vehicle with explosives. El Salvador subsequently escalated its involvement and deployed thousands of soldiers to Haiti. One week later, a nongovernmental organization turned over four bodies they said were those of the Salvadorans. However, President Nayib Bukele disputed this and said they did not belong to the airmen.

== See also ==
- Haitian crisis (2018–present)
- Haitian National Police
- Armed Forces of Haiti
- Gang war in Haiti
- List of non-UN peacekeeping missions
- Operation Uphold Democracy
- United Nations Security Council Resolution 940
- List of United Nations Security Council Resolutions 2601 to 2700 (2021–2023)
- United Nations Stabilisation Mission in Haiti
