= Artibonite Valley =

Valley spanning Haiti and the Dominican Republic

Coordinates: 19°7′30.21″N 72°28′58.75″W

- Location within Haiti
- Interactive map of Artibonite Valley

Artibonite Valley (French: Vallée de l'Artibonite) is a valley predominantly in Haiti, on the island of Hispaniola. The Artibonite River flows through the valley, with headwaters in the Dominican Republic as well.

The valley's watershed provides vital ecosystem services on which the socio-economic development of one of the poorest areas of the Dominican Republic and Haiti depends. These services have been adversely impacted by deforestation, inappropriate land use, and harmful agricultural practices, which cumulatively have resulted in severe land degradation and threats to water resources.
