= List of massacres in Haiti =

The following is a list of massacres that have occurred in Haiti, following the end of the Haitian Revolution in Saint-Domingue which declared its independence from France on 1 January 1804 and became the world's first and oldest black-led republic in the Americas, the first Caribbean state and the first Latin American country as a whole in the Western Hemisphere after the United States (numbers may be approximate):

== Massacres ==
Name	Date	Location	Deaths	Notes
Taíno genocide	1493 – 1550	All across the island of Hispaniola	60,000 to 1,000,000	After the arrival of Christopher Columbus in 1492 which led to the Genocide of Taíno population through diseases, starvation, forced labor, abuse and neglect over 80–90% of every Taíno people killed
Jaragua massacre	July 1503	Jaragua, Hispaniola	80+	Killing of Indigenous people from the town of Xaragua on the island of Hispaniola
1804 Haiti massacre	February 1804 – 22 April 1804	All across the country	3,000 to 5,000	Killing of Haiti's white population on the orders of the Haitian general Jean-Jacques Dessalines.
Les Cayes massacre	6 December 1929	Marchaterre, Les Cayes	12-22	United States Marine Corps troops fire upon a group of 1,500 Haitians in Les Cayes who were protesting against the United States occupation of Haiti
Fignolists massacre	16-17 June 1957	Haiti	unknown	After Kébreau's coup against Daniel Fignolé, the Haitian army massacred an unknown number of supporters of the deposed president.
Massacre of 26 of April 1963	26 April 1963	Port-au-Prince	73	Assassinations and arrests of dozens of alleged opponents of the Duvalier dictatorship and their families, mostly soldiers, before he declared himself "president for life" the following year.
Massacre of the peasants of Mapou	July and August 1964	Arrondissement of Belle-Anse, Southeast Haiti	300-600	In response to an incursion by 15 anti-Duvalier militants of the FARH (Forces Armées Révolutionnaires d’Haïti) on June 29, the Haitian army, the militia, the paramilitary forces, death squads and the secret police known as the Tonton Macoutes (Volontaires de la Sécurité Nationale, VSN) killed several hundred residents of the towns of Thiotte, Grand-Gosier, Belle-Anse (Saltrou) and Anse-a-Pitres on the orders of the Haitian dictator François Duvalier (Papa Doc). The largest numbers of killings occurred in Mapou, a section of Belle-Anse, including at least 45 members of the Madoumbe family. Nineteen members of the family Fandal were shot, mainly in Thiotte. Government forces never successfully engaged the rebels, who abandoned their efforts in August 1964. Arbitrary executions continued to be frequent through 1965.
Jérémie Vespers	August through October 1964	Jérémie, Grand Anse, Haiti	27	All members of several Jeremie families were executed in retaliation for the attempted guerrilla incursion in August by 13 members of "Jeune Haiti." Children and elderly people were amongst those murdered by the army, the secret police, private militia and other elements of François Duvalier dictatorship.
Fort Dimanche massacre	26 April 1986	Fort Dimanche, Port-au-Prince	11-15	Soldiers opened fire on demonstrators during a mass in memory of the victims of the 1963 massacre in front of Fort Dimanche facilities in Port-au-Prince, which caused numerous victims.
Jean-Rabel massacre	23 July 1987	Jean-Rabel	139-200	Battle between wealthy landowners and a land-reform group
Haitian general election, 1987	November 1987	All across the country	30-300.	Attacks on voters.
St. Jean Bosco massacre	11 September 1988	Port-au-Prince	13-150.	Politically motivated attack on a church service, which was being led by future-President Jean-Bertrand Aristide, who was a priest at the time.
Pétionville bombing	5 December 1990	Pétion-Ville, Ouest Port-au-Prince	5-7	
Raboteau massacre	22 April 1994	Gonaïves	8-15	Massacre of civilian demonstrators.
2018 Port-au-Prince massacre	13–18 November 2018	La Saline, Port-au-Prince	71	Massacre of civilians by masked men
Croix-des-Bouquets jailbreak	25 February 2021	Croix-des-Bouquets, Ouest	26	More than 400 prisoners escaped during the jailbreak
Bel Air massacre	27 August 2020 - 15 May 2021	Belair, Port-au-Prince	81	16 wounded
Battle of Plaine du Cul-de-Sac	24 April and 6 May 2022	Plaine du Cul-de-Sac, Port-au-Prince	200	Clashes broke out between the 400 Mawozo gang and the Chen Mechan gang, Nearly 200 people were killed, many of whom were civilians.
2022 Port-au-Prince gang battles	8-9 July 2022	Port-au-Prince	89	Outbreak of gang violence occurred in the Haitian capital of Port-au-Prince, leaving 89 people dead and over 74 injured
2022 Cabaret attack	28-29 November 2022	Cabaret	20+	20 people were killed by armed gangs in the town of Cabaret, a suburb of the Haitian capital of Port-au-Prince.
2024 Pont-Sondé attack	3 October 2024	Pont-Sondé, Artibonite department	115+	Armed gunmen from the Gran Grif gang commit a mass shooting with automatic rifles and a series of arson attacks in the town of Pont-Sondé, killing 115+ people and seriously injuring 50 others
2024 Cité Soleil massacre	6-7 December 2024	Cité Soleil, Port-au-Prince	207	Massacre of elderly practitioners of Haitian Vodou.
Labodrie massacre	11-12 September 2025	Labodrie, Arcahaie	50+	Massacre of Labodrie village residents by Viv Ansanm militants

== See also ==
- Crime in Haiti
- Natural disasters in Haiti
- Famine in Haiti
