= Timeline of gang-related events in Haiti =

The following article is a list of gang-related events that have happened in Haiti since its independence.

== 1950s ==
=== 1958 ===
- François 'Papa Doc' Duvalier creates the Tonton Macoute, a paramilitary force, which becomes a tool for domestic security, engaging in massacres, assassinations, and political violence.

== 1970s ==
=== 1971 ===
- Duvalier renames Tonton Macoute to Volunteers for National Security.

== 1980s ==
=== 1986 ===
- The Volunteers for National Security is disbanded after protests against Duvalier but continues to operate informally. People attack Macoutes in Port-au-Prince, stoning and burning alive their targets.

=== 1987 ===
- Army kills 22 dockworkers, and paramilitaries kill 139 peasants in Jean-Rabel. Political violence increases.

=== 1988 ===
==== September ====
- Saint-Jean Bosco massacre occurs, as 13 are killed by armed men, suspected to be former Macoutes.
- Prosper Avril resigns amid protests, leading to a new provisional government.

== 1990s ==
=== 1990 ===
==== March ====
- A massacre in Piatre results in 11 killed over a land dispute.

=== 1991 ===
==== September ====
- The SSP militia emerges, deposing Jean-Bertrand Aristide in a coup as he flees.

=== 1993 ===
- The FRAPH paramilitary group forms to support Joseph Raoul Cédras, carrying out massacres including on Carrefour Vincent and Raboteau.

=== 1994 ===
- Aristide returns with help from multinational forces, and creates new Haitian police forces.

==== September ====
- RAM, the Oloffson hotel’s house band, face threats amid political unrest.

=== 1996 ===
- Aristide disbands Haitian military, and former soldiers join armed groups.

=== 1998 ===
==== February ====
- Eight people are killed in an assassination attempt on Richard Morse during Kanaval celebrations.

== 2000s ==
=== 2003 ===
- The National Revolutionary Front forms, consisting mainly of anti-government gangs and former soldiers.

=== 2004 ===
==== February ====
- Artibonite Resistance Front takes Gonaives, leading to Aristide's departure.

==== March ====
- Paramilitaries capture the former military headquarters, as Aristide supporters and activists are hunted down.

=== 2005 ===
- Police deploy vigilantes to raid the Aristide-supporting gangs.

== 2010s ==
=== 2010 ===
- The 2010 Haiti Earthquake causes a prison break, resulting in the rise of multiple new gangs like the Armée Fédérale.

=== 2011 ===
- Gender-based violence and gang recruitment increase in camps after the earthquake.

==== March ====
- Michel Joseph Martelly announces the reinstatement of the Haiti military, and ex-military gangs begin to assert control over military buildings.

=== 2015 ===
- Jovenel Moïse becomes a presidential candidate for the PHTK after the elections are marked by violence.

=== 2016 ===
- The 400 Mawozo gang forms in Croix des Bouquets.

== 2020s ==
=== 2020 ===
==== May ====
- A coalition of 11 gangs (Delmas 19, Delmas 6, Delmas 95, Nan Barozi, Nan Belekou, Nan Boston, Nan Chabón, Nan Ti Bwa, Pilate Base, Simon Pele, and Wharf de Jeremie) attacked several neighborhoods in Port-au-Prince as a way to secure and expand territorial control. The same month, they attacked civilians in the neighborhoods of Port-au-Prince, killing 34 people.

=== 2021 ===
==== April ====
- Clashes between rival gangs in Port-au-Prince result in hundreds of deaths, and 16,000 Haitians are displaced.

==== June ====
- 1 June - A gang coalition seizes control of a key section of the only national road leading south from Port-au-Prince, isolating the capital from the rest of Haiti.

==== July ====
- 50 Haitians are killed in clashes between G-Pèp and G9 gangs in Cité Soleil.
- 7 July - Haitian President Jovenel Moïse is assassinated at his private residence in Port-au-Prince.

==== September ====
- Gangs control parts of Haiti, imposing curfews and driving thousands from homes.

==== October ====
- G9 holds up fuel trucks to cause fuel shortages and begins to demand Prime Minister Ariel Henry's resignation.

==== November ====
- A G-Pèp gang led by Gabriel Jean-Pierre attacks a hospital and takes hostages that include women and children.

=== 2022 ===
- Gangs federate into G9 and G-Pèp alliances, as 400 Mawozo joins G-Pèp.
- Jimmy Chérizier's G9 gang blockades Haiti's main fuel import route, causing island-wide shortages.

=== 2023 ===
==== July ====
- Gang violence disrupts food and energy supply chains, raising prices and exacerbating the crisis in Haiti.
- In Tabarre, gangs forcibly remove a patient from a hospital, triggering a mass exodus of residents to the US embassy.
- 25 July - Haitians flee tear gas at the US embassy, attempting to escape gang violence.
- 27 July - US State Department orders all non-emergency personnel to leave Haiti, following a warning to citizens about travel safety.
- 31 July - US nurse Alix Dorsainvil and her child are kidnapped.

==== September ====
- G9 and G-Pèp form a temporary Viv Ansanm to oust Henry and oppose foreign intervention.

=== 2024 ===
==== February ====
- 22 February - Cherizier is seen patrolling the streets of Delmas 3 in Port-au-Prince with G9 federation members.
- 29 February - Coordinated gang attacks across Port-au-Prince kill at least four police officers. Chérizier claims responsibility, aiming to capture officials and block Henry's return from Kenya.

==== March ====
- Gangs control approximately 80% of Port-au-Prince, effectively paralyzing the city.
- 1 March - Henry signs an agreement with Kenya to deploy 1,000 police officers to combat gang violence, though the deployment is delayed by a court ruling declaring it unconstitutional.
- 2 March - Gangs storm two major prisons, releasing over 4,000 inmates, prompting police to urgently request international assistance.
- 3 March - The government declares a state of emergency and imposes a nighttime curfew in response to the escalating violence.
- 4 March - Armed gangs attempt to seize control of Toussaint Louverture International Airport, halting flights and adding to the chaos while Henry remains out of the country.
- 5 March - Henry's flight to the Dominican Republic is diverted to Puerto Rico after Chérizier declares war on him and air traffic is suspended between Haiti and its neighbors.
- 6 March - As Henry remains locked out of the country, Haitian politicians form alliances and pressures mount on him to resign, both domestically and internationally.
- 7 March - The government extends the state of emergency and nighttime curfew while Henry struggles to regain control.
- 8 March - Police increase patrol of Port-au-Prince as gang violence continues to escalate.
- 11 March - Gang members are observed sitting together in Port-au-Prince, illustrating their continued control over the city according to some.
- 13 March - Henry announces his resignation plan amidst growing pressure from both the international community and gang leaders, with gangs warning of a civil war.
- 21 March - The international community debates over Haitian intervention, with Kenya pledging police support to restore order amid the growing gang violence.

==== June ====
- 25 June - 800 Kenyan police officers arrive at Toussaint Louverture International Airport as part of the U.N.-backed Multinational Security Support Mission (MSS) to aid Haitian police in combating armed gangs.

==== July ====
- Kenyan police officers are deployed near the National Palace in Port-au-Prince as part of a peacekeeping mission.

==== October ====
- 4 October - Gang members attack Pont-Sondé, killing 70 people. The Gran Grif gang, armed with knives and assault rifles, launch the assault at night, using canoes for a quiet approach.
- 6 October - Survivors of the Pont-Sonde attack, numbering 6,270 people, are left homeless. They are crowded into temporary shelters in Saint-Marc, including a church and school.
- 7 October - The government deploys armored vehicles and medical supplies to the affected areas, as Gran Grif, led by Luckson Elan, becomes the largest gang in Artibonite.
- 8 October - UN sanctions are imposed on Elan.
- 17 October - Soldiers patrol Port-au-Prince as Solino, one of the few gang-free communities in Port-au-Prince, comes under attack.
- 20 October - Haiti's National Police seize control of several areas in Solino while continuing to pursue gang members.
- 21 October - Prime Minister Garry Conille announces the recall of elite police and soldiers to reinforce areas under gang assault, including Solino.

==== November ====
- 14 November - Residents flee the Nazon neighborhood of Port-au-Prince due to escalating gang violence and displacement.

==== December ====
- In Cité Soleil, at least 207 people are killed over a five day period during coordinated gang attacks.
- 9 December - People flee their homes in the Poste Marchand suburb of Port-au-Prince due to weekend gang violence involving Viv Ansanm.
- 10 December - Armed gangs set fire to cars in the Poste Marchand area.

=== 2025 ===
==== January ====
- Over 1 million Haitians are displaced due to escalating gang violence in Port-au-Prince, with more than half being children.
- 20 January - Executive Order 14169 signed by U.S. President Donald Trump suspends all new U.S. foreign funding and humanitarian aid to Haiti.
- 27 January – Armed gangs begin an assault on Belot and Godet communities of Kenscoff, killing at least 50 people, injuring 11, and displacing 3,000 people. At least 20 gang members are reportedly killed by security forces.

==== March ====
- 7 March - Fritz Alphonse Jean officially becomes President of Haiti’s Transitional Presidential Council (TPC).
- 9 March - Police seize 10,000 bullets, weapons, and drugs in Mirebalais, northeast of Port-au-Prince.
- 11 March - Viv Ansanm initiates an attack on the Carrefour-Feuilles neighborhood, trapping priests inside a church.
- 12 March - Haitian authorities evacuate students from a Catholic school in western Port-au-Prince due to heavy gunfire in the area near the Oloffson Hotel.
- 25 March - Kenyan police officer Benedict Kuria Kabiru is killed after a gang ambush during a patrol in Pont-Sondé. Initially reported missing, his death is confirmed by the TPC.
- 26 March - UNICEF warns that Ready-to-Use Therapeutic Food stocks are running short due to U.S. aid funding cuts.
- 28 March -
  - UN Human Rights Chief Volker Türk describes the situation as a "catastrophe" due to escalating gang violence, widespread impunity, and political instability, urging international action to address the crisis.
  - Former Jamaican Prime Minister Bruce Golding warns that Haiti is "perilously close" to being a failed state, urging international intervention to secure its future.
- 31 March -
  - Viv Ansanm takes control of Mirebalais and facilitates the escape of 515 prisoners from a local jail.
  - Two religious sisters, Evanette Onezaire and Jeanne Voltaire (both members of the Little Sisters of Saint Therese of the Child Jesus) are killed in Mirebalais, during a gang attack by the Vivre Ensemble coalition.

==== April ====
- 2 April - Mass protests against gang violence in Port-au-Prince as thousands of citizens demand the resignation of government coalition leader Alix Didier Fils-Aimé.
- 5 April - Reports highlight the severe impact of the Trump administration's dismantling of the Inter-American Foundation on Haiti, with aid programs affecting thousands of Haitians.
- 10 April - The government confirms drone strikes on gangs amid escalating violence.
- 16 April - The Haitian Army patrols Port-au-Prince during public protests against insecurity.
- 17 April - A UN-backed report warns that over half of Haiti’s population will face severe hunger through June 2025.
- 21 April - UN Special Representative María Isabel Salvador warns that Haiti is nearing "total chaos" due to escalating gang violence.
- 23 April - Viv Ansanm attempts to force the closure and evacuation of the Mirebalais University Hospital.
- 24–30 April - The Gran Grif gang launch several attacks on Petite Rivière, initiating several days of violence killing at least 50 people and injuring 60 others.

==== May ====
- 1 May - The United States designates Viv Ansanm and Gran Grif as terrorist organizations.
- 2 May -
  - Reporters Without Borders ranks Haiti 111th in its 2025 World Press Freedom Index, citing state collapse and gang violence.
  - UN reports a worsening healthcare crisis in Haiti, as 42% of healthcare facilities are closed in Port-au-Prince.
  - University Hospital of Mirebalais suspends operations due to a wave of insecurity, contributing to a healthcare collapse in the Centre Department.
- 3 May - Hundreds gather for a memorial for slain community leaders in Canapé-Vert, as armed mourners in balaclavas vow to continue resisting gangs.
- 4 May - Protesters march through Port-au-Prince, demanding security and the resignation of Haiti’s leadership amid ongoing gang violence.
- 6 May - Haiti's Center for Analysis and Research for Human Rights warns that the U.S. terror designations could harm humanitarian efforts in the gang-controlled zones.
- 7 May - Haiti's central bank issues guidance to financial institutions to monitor and avoid transactions that could fund terrorist groups.
- 8 May - The Global Initiative Against Transnational Organized Crime states that terror designations might backfire by restricting NGO access to gang-held areas.
- 9 May - The International Rescue Committee warns that continued funding withdrawal risks destabilization and potential extremist gains in Haiti.
- 12 May - Kenya and Dominican Republic call for more funding for the MSS mission, citing struggles to curb gang violence due to limited resources.
- 13 May - Protesters shut down the Péligre hydroelectric plant, resulting in a total power outage in Port-au-Prince and central Haiti.
- 15 May - A protest erupts in Port-au-Prince against gang violence and demands for the resignation of the TPC.
- 16 May - The UN-backed 2025 Global Report on Food Crises is released, identifying Haiti as one of the countries severely impacted by hunger due to conflict.
- 17 May - Kenya formally requests Brazil's support in both funding and expertise for the MSS.
- 22 May - At an Organization of American States meeting, Haitian ministers appeal for urgent regional security assistance to combat armed gangs.
- 24 May - At least 50 people are killed in a gang attack in Preval in central Haiti.
- 25 May - Reports confirm Haiti is running out of HIV medication after USAID cuts, as protests are held in Port-au-Prince by HIV-positive individuals calling for government action.
- 27 May - Dominica Prime Minister Roosevelt Skerrit publicly urges negotiation with Haitian gangs.
- 29 May - The government employs private military contractors to use drones and other means to kill gang members as part of a task force aimed at reclaiming gang-controlled territory.

==== June ====
- 3 June - Around 14,000 people are displaced from Kenscoff, Ouest, after gang violence leads to homes being burned.
- 8 June - Haitians are seen at the country's only functioning airport boarding planes to the United States amid fears of violence and kidnapping.
- 9 June -
  - Trump's travel ban on Haitians to the US takes effect.
  - A Colombian suspect testifies in court in Port-au-Prince denying involvement in the assassination of Moïse.
- 11 June - The UN's International Organization for Migration reports a record 1.3 million people have been displaced by gang-related violence in Haiti.
- 12 June - The U.S. Department of Homeland Security announces the immediate revocation of temporary legal status and work permits for Haitians under the humanitarian parole program.
- 13 June - Brazil President Luiz Inácio Lula da Silva, during a meeting with Caribbean leaders in Brasília, calls on the United Nations to finance the current Haiti mission.
- 16 June - The UN’s Hunger Hotspots report identifies Haiti as one of five countries at immediate risk of starvation.
- 17 June - Haiti officially restarts its stalled investigation into the assassination of Moïse.
- 21 June - Fritz Alphonse Jean confirms the government’s use of foreign private security contractors in the anti-gang fight.
- 22 June - The “Talibans” gang seize La Chapelle in a pre-dawn attack, torching the police station and sealing off the town, forcing police to flee.
- 24 June - The US embassy urges American citizens to “depart Haiti as soon as possible” due to escalating gang violence and instability.
- 26 June - Prime Minister Alix Didier Fils-Aime attends an event marking one year since the start of the MSS.
- 27 June -
  - Commander Godfrey Otunge appeals for more international support, citing severe shortages in troops, equipment, and funding.
  - U.S. District Judge Brian Cogan blocks an early termination of Temporary Protected Status for Haitians, preserving protections through 3 February 2026, citing unlawful procedures by Homeland Security.
  - The Organization of American States adopts a resolution calling for a 45-day action plan to improve security and support political dialogue.
- 28 June - Protests begin in Port-au-Prince against insecurity, with demonstrators calling for drones to protect people rather than target them.
- 29 June - The US Embassy issues an urgent warning for Americans to leave Haiti immediately due to the ongoing violence and instability.

==== July ====
- 2 July -
  - Haitian police raid a medical facility in Pétion-Ville suspected of involvement in illicit organ trafficking.
  - The UN reports gangs are disrupting key trade routes including Belladere and Malpasse with attacks on police and customs officials.
- 3 July -
  - A wave of gang attacks in Centre Department displaces nearly 27,500 people in a single day, leading to the creation of 23 displacement sites.
  - Kenyan police patrol areas near Port-au-Prince's airport.
- 6 July - Gangs set fire to the historic Grand Hôtel Oloffson in Port-au-Prince during an armed assault on the Pacot neighborhood.
- 7 July - Six UNICEF employees are kidnapped during an authorized mission in gang-controlled territory in Port-au-Prince.
- 10 July - Fritz Jean issues an open letter calling for more transparency from Fils-Aimé regarding drone task force operations.
- 11 July - The UN releases a joint report by UN Integrated Office in Haiti (BINUH) and OHCHR documenting severe human rights violations in Haiti amid escalating gang violence, particularly in the Artibonite and Centre Departments.
- 12 July - Haiti appeals to CARICOM for regional solidarity, as the incoming TPC president Laurent Saint Cyr emphasized the need for unity in supporting Haiti’s security and development.
- 13 July - The UN High Commissioner for Human Rights calls for international intervention in Haiti, citing both gang violence and increasing human rights abuses by self-defence groups.
- 14 July - U.S. Deputy Secretary Landau meets with Fils-Aimé to discuss security, support for the MSS mission, and sanctions against destabilizers.
- 15 July -
  - The U.S. State Department reissues a Level 4 “Do Not Travel” advisory for Haiti due to high levels of kidnapping, violent crime, terrorism, and civil unrest.
  - The United Nations Security Council unanimously extends the mandate of BINUH until 31 January 2026 to support Haiti's democratic transition.
- 16 July - A substitute pilgrimage is held in Port-au-Prince as gangs control Saut-d’Eau, with the gang leaders appearing at the original church.
- 17 July - Pierre Reginald Boulos is arrested in Miami by ICE for gang support and actions contributing to Haiti's destabilization.
- 18 July - Gangs attack the Marchand-Dessalines area in Artibonite Department, setting fire to the local police station, forcing officers to flee and killing one civilian.
- 19 July - Colombian President Gustavo Petro visits Port-au-Prince, focusing on security cooperation amid the escalating gang violence.

==== August ====
- 1 August – A UN report confirms over 1,500 Haitians were killed between April and June in 2025 due to gang violence.
- 5 August – Irish missionary Gena Heraty, a child, and seven staff are kidnapped from an orphanage in Kenscoff.
- 9 August – Haiti's government announced a three-month state of emergency in West, Centre and Artibonite departments, citing a spike in gang violence.
- 27 August – Haitian police and MSS forces recapture a telecommunication base in Kenscoff Mountain after it was captured by Viv Asanm members a week prior. The security forces killed or captured a dozen gang members and captured weapons and equipment.

==== September ====
- 12 September – At least 42 people are reported killed following an attack by the Viv Ansanm gang on the village of Labodrie.
- 15 September – A gang attack on an armored vehicle kills the driver and injures two police officers in Kenscoff.
- 20 September – Fifteen people are killed, including at least eight children in a drone attack on a birthday party in Cité Soleil where an alleged gang leader was distributing gifts.

==== November ====
- 13 November – A shootout occurs between suspected gang members and US Marines guarding the US embassy in Port-au-Prince.
- 14 November – Port-au-Prince police is forced to destroy its own helicopter after it made an emergency landing following an operation in Croix-des-Bouquets that leaves seven gang members dead.
- 18 November – Haitian men's senior soccer team qualifies for the World Cup. That leads to their second participation.
- 22 November – Specialized units of the Haitian National Police, supported by a kamikaze drone unit, launched an offensive against the Viv Ansanm coalition in Viar, Godet, Bélot, and other areas near Kenscoff.
- 30 November – Heavily armed fighters from the Gran Grif gang attacked the towns of Bercy and Pont-Sondé during the night, killing dozens of people and set fires to homes. Survivors were forced to flee to nearby towns. Police has asserted that 50% of the Artibonite region had fallen under gang control.

==== December ====
- 8 December – At least 49 people are killed in clashes between gangs in Port-au-Prince.

=== 2026 ===
==== March ====
- 29 March - 1 April – At least 70 people have been killed and 30 injured during attacks by the Gran Grif gang on the areas of Petite-Rivière, Jean-Denis, Pont-Sondé and Marchand-Dessalines in Artibonite region. Dozens of houses have been burned down and nearly 6,000 people were forced to flee.

==== April ====
- 2 April – First Chadian troops from the UN-backed Gang Suppression Force arrived in Port-au-Prince.

==== August ====
- 23 August - Around 40 people are killed by gang members in Kenscoff.
