= Crime in Haiti =

- Homicide: 64.3 (2024)
- Assault: 11.7 (2018)
- Rape: 1.8 (2018)
- reported per 100,000 inhabitants

Crime in Haiti is investigated by the Haitian police. Since the late 2010s, the country has suffered from widespread gang warfare and civil unrest, including a massive prison breakout in 2024. It also suffers from extreme corruption and high levels of sexual violence.

== Crime by type ==
=== Murders in Haiti ===
Reliable crime statistics for Haiti are difficult to come by. A comparative analysis of figures from various police/security entities operating throughout Haiti indicates that incidents of crimes tend to be inaccurately or under-reported. Thus, for example, the United Nations office on Drugs and Crime UNODC documented 1,033 murders, for a murder rate of 10.2 per 100,000 people, in 2012, and as few as 486 (5.1 per 100,000 people) in 2007.

In the 22 months after the ouster of President Aristide in 2004, the murder rate for Port-au-Prince reached an all-time high of 219 murders per 100,000 residents. In contrast, an independent study tracking a large number of households in urban areas of Haiti recorded 11 murders among 15,690 tracked residents during a 7-month period from August 2011 to February 2012. Preliminary results of the assessment found:

The number of reported homicides across all urban settings increased considerably between November 2011 and February 2012. Half of the reported murders occurred during armed robbery or attempted armed robbery. While Port-au-Prince's overall homicide is low in comparison to other Caribbean cities, this nevertheless represents a rate of 60.9 per 100,000, one of the highest recorded rates since 2004 . . .

All but one of the murders occurred in Port-au-Prince. (See: crime in Port-au-Prince)

=== Sexual violence ===
Sexual violence in Haiti is a common phenomenon. Being raped is considered shameful in Haitian society, and victims may find themselves abandoned by loved ones or with reduced marriageability. Until 2005, rape was not legally considered a serious crime and a rapist could avoid jail by marrying his victim. Reporting a rape to police in Haiti is a difficult and convoluted process, a factor that contributes to under-reporting and difficulty in obtaining accurate statistics about sexual violence. Few rapists face any punishment.

A UN Security Council study in 2006 reported 35,000 sexual assaults against women and girls between 2004 and 2006. The UN reported in 2006 that half of the women living in the capital city Port-au-Prince's slums had been raped. United Nations peacekeepers stationed in Haiti since 2004 have drawn widespread resentment after reports emerged of the soldiers raping Haitian civilians.

The 2010 Haitian earthquake caused over a million Haitians to move to refugee camps where conditions are dangerous and poor. A study by a human rights group found that 14% of Haitian households reported having at least one member who suffered sexual violence between the January 2010 earthquake and January 2012. In 2012, sexual assaults in Port-au-Prince were reported at a rate 20 times higher in the camps than elsewhere in Haiti.

A 2009 study reported that up to 225,000 Haitian children are forced to work as domestic servants and are at grave risk of rape at the hands of their captors. The children, known as restaveks, are traded into other households by their families, exchanging the children's labor for upbringing. Two thirds of restaveks are female, and most of them come from very poor families and are given to better-off ones. Restaveks who are young and female are particularly likely to be victimized sexually. Female restaveks are sometimes referred to as "la pou sa" which translates as "there for that," where "that" refers to the sexual pleasure of the males of the family with whom they are staying.

=== Corruption ===
Corruption is a severe and widespread problem in all levels of government in Haiti. Although there has been some progress since 2008, when Haiti was rated the world's fourth most corrupt country, there remains much room for improvement.

Corruption was always "endemic" in Haiti, but became so "widespread that it bankrupted state finances" under the rule of Jean-Claude Duvalier ("Baby Doc"). Under Duvalier's regime (1971–1986), Haiti's transportation network was plundered, and regime elites frequently "raided the accounts of state monopolies" such as the Régie du Tabac (Tobacco Administration) while failing to pay taxes.

Economist Leslie Delatour described Haiti's economy as one in near-shambles. Legal experts have cited a lack of judicial integrity in the country. Two experts in public administration, Derick Brinkerhoff and Carmen Halpern, said that government corruption is ingrained in Haitian politics.

=== Illegal drug trade ===
The illegal drug trade in Haiti involves trans-shipment of cocaine and marijuana to the United States. It is a major shipment route. The island of Hispaniola, which Haiti shares with the Dominican Republic, places Haiti in an ideal location for drug smuggling between Colombia and Puerto Rico. Because Puerto Rico is a Commonwealth of the United States, shipments are generally not subject to further U.S. Customs inspection after reaching the territory. Cocaine is also often smuggled directly to Miami in freighters.

U.S. government agencies estimate that 83 metric tons or about eight percent of the cocaine entering the United States in 2006 transited either Haiti or the Dominican Republic. Throughout the late 1980s and into the 1990s, leading members of the Haitian military, intelligence and police were involved in the illegal drug trade in Haiti, assisting Colombian drug traffickers smuggling drugs into the United States.

=== Kidnapping, robbery ===
Crimes such as kidnappings, death threats, murders, armed robberies, home break-ins and car-jacking are not uncommon in Haiti. From 2007 to 2016 there was a major decrease in kidnappings of U.S. citizens, but a rise in armed robberies. The incidence of kidnapping in Haiti diminished from its peak in 2006 when 60 US citizens were reported kidnapped to one kidnapping in 2014.

Since May 2014, there have been incidents involving travelers arriving in Port-au-Prince who are attacked and robbed after driving away from the airport. The US Embassy is aware of cases involving 64 US citizens, resulting in three fatalities and several injuries. All cases have involved armed robbery by thieves on motorcycles pulling alongside vehicles in congested traffic. Almost all the victims have been US citizens of Haitian descent. Police authorities believe criminals may target travelers arriving on flights from the United States based on advance information gained from local contacts.

In October 2021, seventeen people associated with an American aid group, including five children, were kidnapped by a gang while visiting an orphanage in Port-au-Prince. The kidnappers demanded $17 million for their release.

On November 7, 2022, the U.S. Department of Justice unsealed criminal charges against several prominent Haitian gang leaders involved in kidnapping US citizens. The indictments included charges accusing three gang leaders of involvement in the armed kidnapping of 16 US citizens in Haiti in the Fall of 2021. Simultaneous with the unsealing the US State Department announced rewards of $3 million for information leading to the capture of the three gang leaders.

== By location ==
=== Port-au-Prince ===
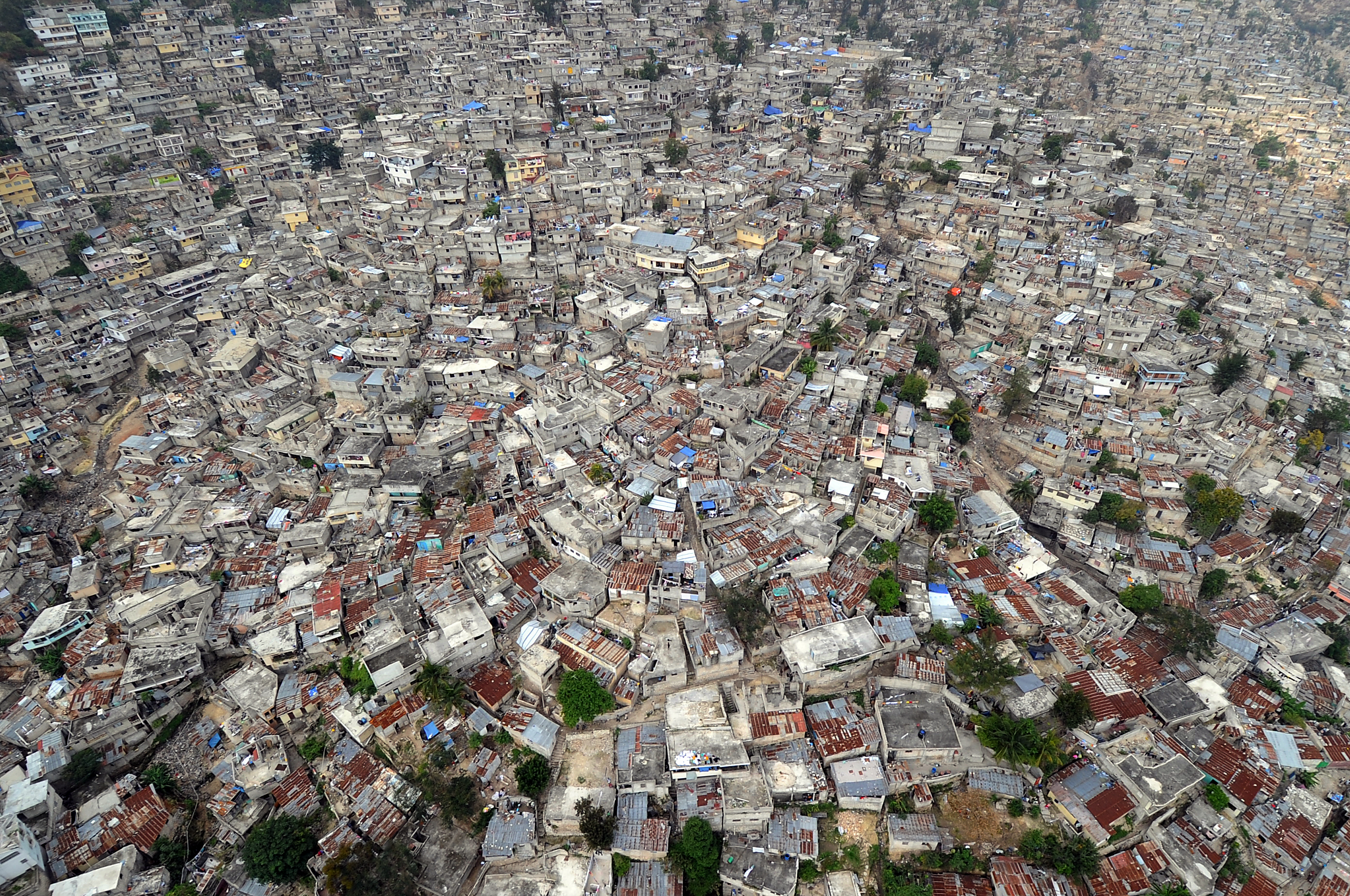
A dense slum in Port-au-Prince.

A 2012 independent study found that the murder rate in the capital Port-au-Prince was 60.9 murders per 100,000 residents in February 2012. In the 22 months after the end of the President Aristide era in 2004, the murder rate for Port-au-Prince reached a high of 219 murders per 100,000 residents per year.

High-crime zones in the Port-au-Prince area include Croix-des-Bouquets, Cité Soleil, Carrefour, Bel Air, Martissant, the port road (Boulevard La Saline), urban route Nationale #1, the airport road (Boulevard Toussaint Louverture) and its adjoining connectors to the New ("American") Road via Route Nationale #1. This latter area in particular has been the scene of numerous robberies, carjackings, and murders.

In the Bel Air neighbourhood of Port-au-Prince, the murder rate reached 50 murders per 100,000 residents at the end of 2011, up from 19 murders per 100,000 residents in 2010.

On 17 October 2021, a high-profile kidnapping targeted a group of 17 missionaries, including five children and seven women. The Ohio-based organization Christian Aid Ministries stated that the group was on its way home from helping to build an orphanage when they were stopped and kidnapped at gunpoint. Authorities believed that the "400 Mawozo" gang abducted the group, including 16 Americans and one Canadian.

== Crime dynamics ==
While the Haitian National Police (HNP) and the UN Stabilization Mission in Haiti (MINUSTAH) personnel patrol many areas, travel within Port-au-Prince can be particularly challenging and certain areas of the city have more crime.

Criminal perpetrators often operate in groups of three to four individuals, and may occasionally be confrontational and gratuitously violent. Criminals sometimes will seriously injure or kill those who resist their attempts to commit crime. In robberies or home invasions, it is not uncommon for the assailants to beat or shoot the victim in order to limit the victim's ability to resist.

=== Carnival ===
Holiday periods, especially Christmas and Carnival, often bring a significant increase in criminal activity. Haiti's Carnival season is marked by street celebrations in the days leading up to Ash Wednesday. In recent years, Carnival has been accompanied by civil disturbances, altercations and severe traffic disruptions. People attending Carnival events or simply caught in the resulting celebrations have been injured and killed.

Roving musical bands called "rah-rahs" operate during the period from New Year's Day through Carnival. The potential for injury and the destruction of property during rah-rahs is high. A mob mentality can develop unexpectedly leaving people and cars engulfed and at risk. During Carnival, rah-rahs continuously form without warning; some rah-rahs have identified themselves with political entities, lending further potential for violence.

=== Haitian police ===
While the size of the Haitian National Police (HNP) is increasing and its capabilities are improving, it is still understaffed and, under-equipped. As a result, it is unable to respond to all calls for assistance. There are allegations of police complicity in criminal activity. The response and enforcement capabilities of the HNP and the weakness of the judiciary often frustrate victims of crime in Haiti.

== See also ==
- List of massacres in Haiti
- Timeline of gang-related events in Haiti
- 2025 Haiti orphanage kidnapping
