= 2022 Port-au-Prince gang battles =

Gang battle in Haiti (2022)

- Part of Crime in Haiti and the gang war in Haiti and 2017–2023 Haitian crisis
- Date: July 8–9, 2022
- Location: Port-au-Prince, Haiti
- Result: Inconclusive

Parties
G9 Gang	G-pep gang

Casualties
- Deaths: 89 (47 gang members and 42 civilians)
- Injuries: 74+

In July 2022, an outbreak of gang violence occurred in the Haitian capital of Port-au-Prince, leaving 89 people dead and over 74 injured.

== Background ==
Since the late 2010's Haiti has suffered a growing epidemic of gang violence and gang-related activity, especially in the capital of Port-au-Prince. The gang violence grew especially after the assassination of Haitian president Jovenel Moise in July 2021. One of the most notable gang leaders in the conflict is Jimmy Chérizier, also known as "Barbecue", who leads the group G9. Barbecue has been known for multiple massacres in the Port-au-Prince area, along with G9 allying with the Haitian government. The 2022 battles began after tensions erupted between G9 and a new rival gang, G-pep, as an example is the outbreak of violence which occurred in the month of May, which left 150 dead and hundreds wounded. This uptick in gang violence also comes at a time when Haiti faces severe food and healthcare shortages.

== Battle ==
Just a day after the one-year anniversary of Moise's assassination on July 7, shooting began around 3 a.m. in the Brooklyn neighborhood of the Cité Soleil slum between G9 and G-Pèp gang members. All the roads in the neighborhood were blocked. Some Haitian police officers were present at the scene, but many were not working as they had not been paid for one month, and others lacked fuel for their vehicles. Initially, deputy mayor Jean Hislain Frederic stated that 50 were killed in the violence and over 50 injured, but that number has since increased, according to the National Human Rights Defense Network.

Doctors Without Borders has stated that the organization has been unable to access the slum due to the violence. The battle also caused the nearby Varreux field terminal to pause operations, leading to a more drastic shortage in fuel as two fuel tankers were unable to be unloaded.
