= YourFellowArab =

American YouTuber and streamer

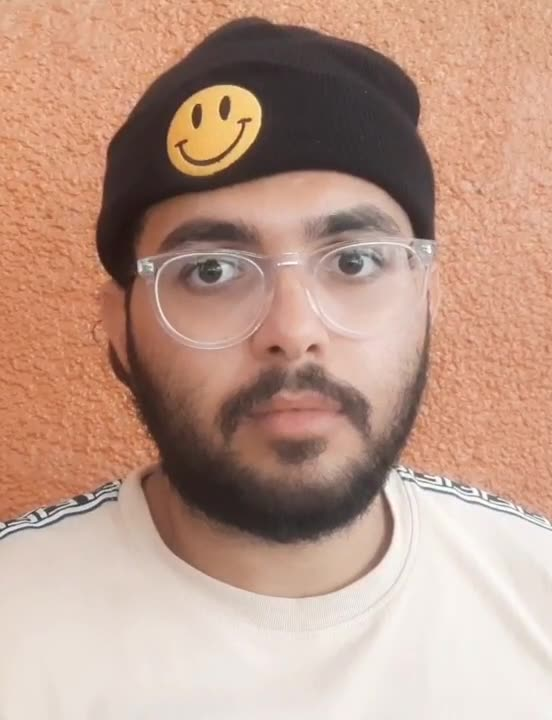
- YourFellowArab in 2024
- Born: Addison Pierre Maalouf; April 30, 1997 (age 29); United States
- Other name: Arab
- Occupations: YouTuber; live streamer; internet personality; journalist

Twitch information
- Channel: Arab
- Years active: 2016–2023
- Genres: Gaming; IRL streams
- Games: Grand Theft Auto V; Fortnite
- Followers: 614,000

YouTube information
- Channels: Arab; Arab Live; Arab Brasil
- Genres: Real life streaming; gaming; comedy; Journalism
- Subscribers: 2.05 million (main); 2.63 million (combined)
- Views: 1.04 billion
- Website: arabuncut.com

Addison Pierre Maalouf (Arabic: أديسون بيير معلوف; born April 30, 1997), known online as YourFellowArab or Arab, is an American YouTuber and online streamer based in Atlanta, Georgia. He became known for touring dangerous locations and went viral for meeting up with gangs in Latin America and Lebanon.

== Online career ==
=== Gaming and Twitch streaming ===
Maalouf uploaded his first YouTube video on April 18, 2016, where he began making commentary and skits and later began live-streaming himself playing video games like Fortnite and Grand Theft Auto V. In 2019 he partook in Fortnite tournaments winning prize money and started coaching other people on the game.

After the 2020 Beirut explosion, Maalouf raised nearly $20,000 in donations for the Red Cross.

On October 30, 2021, he uploaded a video titled "The End" where he announced that he would stop live-streaming video games and instead start filming real-life interactions with people. He also launched his website, Arabuncut.com.

=== Adventures ===
On December 11, 2022, he uploaded a video on YouTube titled "im lost" where he expressed his desire to document and explore dangerous and rarely visited areas himself. Some of his first viral videos was of him exploring South Africa and documenting a rare meeting with Nouh Zaiter, a Lebanese drug lord wanted by Interpol, in the Beqaa Valley. In July 2023, he gained large media attention internationally after interviewing members of the Balaclava-clad favela gang in Rio de Janeiro. He revisited Brazil in January 2024 with YouTuber IShowSpeed; they visited Cidade de Deus community in Rio de Janeiro.

== Kidnapping ==
Amidst an ongoing gang war, on March 13, 2024, Maalouf traveled to Haiti to interview a gang leader named Jimmy Chérizier. However, 24 hours after Maalouf's arrival, he was allegedly taken by members of the 400 Mawozo gang and held for a ransom of $50,000 (which increased to $600,000) along with his guide Sean Roubens Jean Sacra. On March 28, Maalouf's brother posted on X (formerly Twitter) confirming his disappearance, as did fellow YouTuber Miles Routledge and close friend Sneako. On March 30, 2024, Maalouf announced on X that he had been released. On April 5, 2024, Maalouf released his first interview about the kidnapping via his YouTube channel and later released a video series that documented the kidnapping.
