= Reginald Boulos =

Haitian businessman

- Booking photograph released by ICE
- Born: Reginald Pierre Boulos; 1956 (age 69–70); United States of America
- Education: State University of Haiti
- Occupations: Chairman & CEO of Boulos Investment Group, Investor

Reginald Boulos (born 1956) is a Haitian businessman and the former president of the National Chamber of Commerce and Industry of Haiti.

== Early life and education ==
Reginald Boulos was born in 1956, in the United States of America, son of Carlos and Aimee (née Abraham) Boulos, and is one of six children (Frantz Boulos, Kathleen Boulos Weckering, former Haitian Senator Rudolph Boulos, Marie Boulos, Dr. Carlo Boulos). He is of Lebanese and Syrian descent. Along with his brother Dr. Carlo Boulos, they attended and earned a medical degree in 1981 from the Port-au-Prince School of Medicine in Haiti. Reginald then furthered his education by graduating in 1982 with a Master of Public Health and Tropical Medicine at the Tulane University School of Public Health in New Orleans. He conducted research with an associate professor at Johns Hopkins University. He also holds certification from the MIT Sloan School of Management for senior executives.

== Career ==
In 1996, Boulos left the medical practice to start a new career in business development. While representing his family's Boulos Investment Group, he became the Chairman of Intercontinental Bank S.A. (1996–1998) and negotiated a merger with Sogebank, one of Haiti's largest banks. In 2003, Boulos orchestrated the re-engineering of one of the oldest daily newspapers in Haiti, Le Nouveau Matin. From 2000 to 2010, Boulos created and developed Delimart, a chain of supermarkets, Autoplaza, a leading car dealership and Megamart, a membership food discount store. Recently, he organized renovation of a landmark Hotel in Haiti, El Rancho, opened as an NH.

In 2019, Boulos founded the political party, Mouvement Troisième Voix. The political party aimed to recruit 1 million young people on a platform of social justice. In 2020, the party donated hygiene kits to victims of the Bel Air massacre. In March 2021, a car dealership owned by Boulos was ransacked and burned. Boulos blamed the Haitian president for the arson. Four months later, in July 2021, Boulos was preparing to run for president when President Jovenel Moise was murdered. After Moise's death, Boulos was subject to allegations that he supported Moise's assassination.

== Legal issues ==
On July 17, 2025, Boulos was arrested by ICE agents at his home in Palm Beach for alleged involvement with Viv Ansanm that, according to ICE, may have contributed to the destabilization of Haiti. ICE claimed that the presence of Boulos in the United States could "have potential serious adverse foreign policy consequences for the United States, providing a basis for the charge of removability." Moreover, ICE alleged that Boulos had failed to disclose on his application to become a permanent resident of the United States that he was investigated by the Haitian Unit for the Fight Against Corruption for potential misuse of loans and that he had helped found the Mouvement pour la Transformation et la Valorisation d'Haiti—a Haitian political party. ICE accused Boulos of "fraud" and cited these alleged actions as justification for criminal prosecution. Alongside ICE, Boulos was investigated by the Diplomatic Security Service and the Fraud Detection and National Security Directorate of the United States Citizenship and Immigration Services agency.

According to the Miami Herald, court records show that his trial is scheduled to occur on July 31, 2025 in the Krome Service Processing Center and is to be administered by judge Jorge L. Pereira.
