= Guy Sansaricq =

American bishop (1934–2021)

His Excellency, The Most Reverend Guy Sansaricq
- Auxiliary Bishop of Brooklyn
- Church: Roman Catholic Church
- Archdiocese: New York
- Diocese: Brooklyn
- Appointed: June 6, 2006
- Installed: August 22, 2006
- Term ended: October 6, 2010
- Other post: Titular Bishop of Glenndálocha

Orders
- Ordination: June 29, 1960
- Consecration: August 22, 2006 by Nicholas Anthony DiMarzio, Thomas Vose Daily, and Ignatius Anthony Catanello

Personal details
- Born: October 6, 1934 Jérémie, Haiti
- Died: August 21, 2021 (aged 86) Brooklyn, New York, U.S.
Styles of Guy Sansaricq
- Reference style: His Excellency; The Most Reverend
- Spoken style: Your Excellency
- Religious style: Bishop

Guy A. Sansaricq (October 6, 1934 – August 21, 2021), also known as Pierre Marie Guy Sansaricq, was a Haitian-American Catholic prelate who served as auxiliary bishop of the Diocese of Brooklyn from 2006 to 2010. He headed the Office of the Pastoral Care of Migrants and Refugees of the U.S. Conference of Catholic Bishops from 1988 to 2021.

Sansaricq was the first Haitian-born Catholic bishop in the United States. He was an emblematic figure in advocating the rights of Haitian immigrants and the undocumented, as well as an ardent opponent of the Duvalier dictatorship. He was accused of child sex abuse in 2019.

== Biography ==
=== Early life and ministry ===
Sansaricq was born in Jérémie, Haiti, into a Catholic family. He attended the seminary of the Jeremie Diocese for five years, after which he received a scholarship to St. Paul's Pontifical Seminary in Ottawa, Ontario, Canada, where he studied philosophy and theology for seven years.

On June 29, 1960, he was ordained a priest of the Diocese of Les Cayes in Haiti in the cathedral in Port-au-Prince, Haiti.

Sansaricq was first assigned to the staff of the cathedral in Les Cayes. After training there, he worked for seven years as a chaplain for Haitian immigrants in the Bahamas. There he developed his understanding of the plight of emigrants, especially the undocumented. When he completed that assignment, the government of Jean Claude Duvalier refused him reentry into Haiti. Many of his relatives died in a massacre, the Vêpres de Jérémie or Jérémie Vespers, under the Duvalier regime in August 1964. He was given a scholarship to study social sciences at the Pontifical Gregorian University in Rome, where he received a master's degree in 1971 after four years of study.

=== Brooklyn priest ===
In 1971 he moved to the Diocese of Brooklyn and was made coordinator of the Brooklyn Diocese's Haitian Apostolate. He was assigned to Sacred Heart parish in Cambria Heights where he served for 22 years. In the 1970s, he and other Haitian-born priests working in the U.S. founded the National Center of the Haitian Apostolate (NCHA). In October 1988, the NCHA was affiliated with the newly created Office of the Pastoral Care of Migrants and Refugees of the U.S. Conference of Catholic Bishops and Sansaricq was named to head that office, a position he held until his death.

In 1993, he became pastor of St. Jerome's Church in Flatbush, Brooklyn. He was named Prelate of Honour by Pope John Paul II in 1999.

In March 2000, he joined ten other religious leaders in confronting New York City Mayor Rudolph Giuliani and Police Commissioner Howard Safir following the accidental shooting of an unarmed Haitian-American man, Patrick M. Dorismond, in a scuffle with undercover police officers. Sansaricq had officiated at Dorismond's funeral that concluded with a violent altercation with the police.

=== Brooklyn auxiliary bishop ===
On June 6, 2006, Pope Benedict XVI appointed him auxiliary bishop of Brooklyn and titular bishop of Glenndálocha. He received his episcopal consecration on 22 August from Bishop Nicholas Anthony DiMarzio alongside two other new auxiliaries for the diocese.

As a bishop Sansaricq published a quarterly newsletter on Haitian matters and the Church, conducted a pastoral institute in Creole that attracted 90 students annually, organized an annual convention of the Haitian Apostolate, and coordinated an annual retreat for priests and a yearly youth congress. He was also a co-founder of Haitian-Americans for Progress, a service agency, and founded a Haitian based Media Service (Télé-Solidarité).

=== Retirement and death ===
Sansaricq submitted his resignation as required upon reaching the age of 75, and Pope Benedict accepted it on 6 October 2010, his 76th birthday. He remained very active in retirement.

Sansaricq died suddenly on the morning of August 21, 2021, the eve of the 15th anniversary of his episcopal ordination, in the rectory at St. Gregory the Great Church in Crown Heights.

== Sexual abuse allegation ==
Upon his death, Sansaricq was revealed to have been accused in a 2019 lawsuit alleging child sexual abuse dating to the 1990s at St. Jerome Catholic School in Brooklyn. The case was filed by Victor Petit-Phare and was pending in civil and ecclesiastical court.
