= Jean Hislain Frederic =

Mayor of Cite Soleil
- Incumbent
- Assumed office 2016

Personal details
- Born: 1972 or 1973
- Occupation: Human rights defender, politician

Jean Hislain Frederic is a Haitian politician serving as the mayor of Cité Soleil, Port-au-Prince's largest neighborhood, since 2016. He has served as mayor throughout the Haitian gang war and prior gang conflicts.

== Biography ==
Frederic was born in either 1972 or 1973. In 2005, he was recognized by the Inter-American Commission on Human Rights along with other human rights defenders for his work in Collectif des Notables de Cite Soleil (CONOCS), a human rights organization based in Cite Soleil. When Frederic became mayor in 2016, he was faced with only $686 in the neighborhood's budget and $1,000,000 in debt from "zombie" employees. The first major crisis in his tenure was evacuating residents from the low-lying neighborhood from Hurricane Matthew.

In 2018, Frederic launched an investment program in Cite Soleil dubbed "Konbit Bibliyotek Site Soley". Frederic continued welfare programs in the city through 2019, prioritizing education. That same year, he opened up the town hall to Cite Soleil residents fleeing gang attacks in the city that killed 72. In 2020, he distributed 17,500 masks out to residents of the neighborhood during the COVID-19 pandemic. He criticized the Haitian government's handling of the COVID-19 pandemic, deploring the fact that he heard about government updates from the press like everyone else.

The anti-corruption unit of the Haitian government in August 2021 accused Frederic of misappropriating public funds in a town hall in October 2017. Since 2021, Cite Soleil has been one of the most-affected neighborhoods from gang violence.
