= Bel Air massacre =

2020–2021 Haitian event

- Part of Haitian crisis (2018-present)
- Location: Bel Air, Port-au-Prince, Haiti
- Date: August 27, 2020-May 15, 2021
- Deaths: 81 civilians killed: 36 between August and October; 45 between March and May; 24 civilians missing
- Injuries: 16
- Perpetrators: Revolutionary Forces of the G9 Family and Allies (Haitian Creole: Fòs Revolisyonè G9 an Fanmi e Alye): Krache Dife Base

The Bel Air massacre was a series of shootings, extrajudicial killings, and massacres that took place in the Bel Air neighborhood of Port-au-Prince, Haiti between August 2020 and May 2021. Between August and October 2020, G9 An Fanmi e Alye members attacked Bel Air residents, with continued attacks by the affiliated Krache Dife gang. The massacres died down until March 31, whenever renewed attacks began, sparking battles with Bel Air residents who defended themselves.

== Prelude ==
Bel Air is situated in northern Port-au-Prince, under the control of G9 Family and Allies (G9 an Fanmi e Alye), a group of several gangs headed by Jimmy Chérizier. On November 4, 2019, prior to the creation of G9, Bel Air was the site of a massacre perpetrated by Haitian authorities to crack down on anti-government protests. Haitian authorities barricaded parts of the neighborhood and set fire to it, killing twenty-nine civilians. Following the massacre, police gangs controlled the Bel Air neighborhood, one of which formed to become G9 An Fanmi e Alye.

In June 2020, Bel Air residents were under further stress after pressure by G9 to be fully integrated into the G9 area of control. They resisted, however, and tensions escalated.

== Massacre ==
=== Initial mass attacks (August 27-September 19) ===
The conflict began on August 27, 2020, when a man named Michael Saieh was assassinated by unknown gunmen. The gunmen then made their way to Port-au-Prince Cathedral, and shot a police officer nearby. The officer responded, killing a member of the Krache Dife Base, one of the gangs in G9. In response to the shooting, Jimmy "Barbecue" Chérizier ordered G9 to back Krache Dife in a reprisal attack, beginning on the evening of August 27 and continuing until August 31. On August 31, three groups of gangs, spearheaded by Barbecue, attacked the Bel Air neighborhood, forcing many residents to flee to the Champs-De-Mars neighborhood. The residents were forced to return the next day, however, due to public outcry from other civilians. Later, the Haitian Prime Minister Joseph Jouthe stated that Haitian authorities didn't intervene for fear of "collateral victims."

G9 launched another incursion into Bel Air on September 2, shooting indiscriminately into houses. Meanwhile, the gang leader for Simon Pele, a gang affiliated with G9, was arrested by Haitian police in another area of Port-au-Prince that same day, ending the Bel Air incursion early. On September 10, Haitian police stated that they blocked an attempt by G9 to attack Bel Air once again, and that some gang members were injured in the skirmish. By then, 20 civilians had been killed in the attacks, and many Bel Air civilians had taken up arms against the gangs.

A September 19 attack by G9 was repulsed by civilians, who threw rocks and stones at gang members below them. Three gang members were killed, and eight were injured. However, the Nan Barozi gang attacked Bel Air residents over the next two days, causing an unknown number of casualties.

=== Krache Dife reprisals (September 20-December 20) ===
Following the September 19 failure, Krache Dife began attacking several areas of Bel Air sporadically throughout October and September. By October 20, dozens of civilians had been killed, and many houses torched. At least three civilians were killed in an attack on October 16. In an October 19 attack, G9 members clashed with an unknown rival gang in Bel Air, but with no injuries or deaths. From October 20 to December 20, Krache Dife continued incursions, arson attacks, and extrajudicial killings at random in Bel Air, causing many casualties and the loss of property, but it is unknown just how many people were killed or how much was lost. The reprisal attacks ended on December 21, and until March 31, there were no confirmed civilian deaths or injuries.

=== Battle of Bel Air (March 31-May 15) ===
On April 1, G9 attacked Bel Air once again, catching many residents off-guard. Residents speaking to The Haitian Times stated that people were attacked at random, and many civilians were killed. In the new wave of attacks, a gang called Spit Fire aided G9. On the second day of the attacks, one gang member was killed as residents of Bel Air began fighting back. Thirteen people, including three gang members, had been killed by April 2. Later, it was reported three gangs participated in the renewed assaults; Iscard Andrice's gang, Micanor Altes' gang, and Krache Dife. Barbecue later confirmed G9 committed the attacks. An April 15 attack by Krache Dife killed seven civilians. In response, two reprisal attacks on May 14 by armed Bel Air residents killed four people hiding or supporting G9 members. The Haitian National Police intervened the next day, leading to a skirmish with unknown gunmen that killed several.

== Aftermath ==
Between August and October, 36 civilians were killed in the Bel Air massacres. Forty-five were killed in the March through May massacres, mainly in the first days of renewed attacks. Twenty-four people were missing as of May 2021, and sixteen were injured. Hundreds of houses were damaged or destroyed, and over two hundred Bel Air residents became displaced.
