= Battle of Plaine du Cul-de-Sac =

2022 gang conflict in Port-au-Prince, Haiti

- Part of the gang war in Haiti and Haitian crisis
Date	April 24 - May 6, 2022
Location	Plaine du Cul-de-Sac, Haiti
Result	Inconclusive; 400 Mawozo gains some territory in Plaine du Cul-de-Sac; Chen Mechan retains much of its original control

Belligerents
400 Mawozo	Chen Mechan; G-9 An Fanmi e Alye

Casualties and losses
Unknown	9 killed, unknown injured
- 191+ civilians killed Hundreds of civilians injured

Between April 24 and May 6, 2022, clashes broke out between the 400 Mawozo gang and the Chen Mechan gang in Plaine du Cul-de-Sac, Port-au-Prince, Haiti. Nearly 200 people were killed, many of whom were civilians.

== Prelude ==
Since 2018, much of the Haitian capital of Port-au-Prince has been the site of gang wars due to decreasing government influence, exacerbated by the assassination of Jovenel Moïse in 2021. One of the gangs fighting for power in the city is 400 Mawozo, which formed in 2016, and rose to prominence in 2021 for kidnapping several American missionaries. Since then, however, the gang has become the largest gang in Haiti. In 2015, a man named Claudy Celestin created the Chen Mechan gang, with his alias of the same name.

The area of Plaine du Cul-de-Sac was originally under Chen Mechan control in 2016, until the arrest of Celestin that year. In response, a Haitian policeman named Chariot Casimir and his gang called Tout Poussaint took over the area, and became increasingly greedier in extorting the civilian population. Tout Poussaint controlled the area for a year until the release of Celestin, coinciding with the election of Jovenel Moïse. From 2017 to 2020, Plaine du Cul-de-Sac was relatively quiet, with citizens of the area paying ransoms in exchange for defense of the area by the gang. In 2020, residents of the Butte Boyer area rose up against Tout Poussaint, calling on Chen Mechan to take over the area. This led to a series of clashes for Butte Boyer, ending in Chen Mechan's victory. Many gang members of Tout Poussaint fled to 400 Mawozo, disheartened with Casimir's leadership. That same year, Chen Mechan allied with G-9 An Fanmi e Alye.

At the beginning of the conflict, the Tabarre neighborhood of Plaine du Cul-de-Sac was a grey zone between 400 Mawozo and Chen Mechan. The leader of 400 Mawozo, Lanmò 100 Jou, collaborated with Haitian authorities at the beginning of 2022 to gain influence over areas near Plaine du Cul-de-Sac and several parts of it. Locals and 400 Mawozo members claimed that Lanmi 100 Jou desired more of the area, and at the time of the conflict, was ready to attack the Chen Mechan base. Tensions rose on April 22 and 23 in La Plaine du Cul-de-Sac, after the murder of a police officer in Shaba neighborhood by Chen Mechan members. Automatic gunshots were fired the next day in the area the officer was assassinated.

== Battle ==
The first fighting began on April 24, just before 5am, members of 400 Mawozo stormed the Michaud, Butte Boyer, Mapou Street, and Swamp areas of Plaine du Cul-de-Sac simultaneously, ransacking houses and killing civilians. In response, Chen Mechan fighters, aided by members of G-9 An Fanmi e Alye, made their way to the neighborhood, where Chen Mechan began attacking the civilian population as well. Locals attest that 400 Mawozo fighters were looking for supporters of Chen Mechan, whereas Chen Mechan was looking for civilians rebelling against their rule. Many of the bodies were mutilated, or thrown into the local well. That same day, seventeen women at a hotel in the Butte Boyer area were raped and then murdered by 400 Mawozo fighters, claiming they were insiders for Chen Mechan. Thirteen other people, also rumored to be Chen Mechan, were killed.

The following day, Chen Mechan fighters launched an attack on an area occupied by 400 Mawozo. In the attack, Pe Lebren, a gang leader allied with 400 Mawozo, fled to Cité Doudoune, another suburb of Port-au-Prince, but was caught by Chen Mechan and executed. The police station in Tabarre, in Plaine du Cul-de-Sac, also stated that two gang members were killed during a police intervention, and one was lynched by locals. Clashes continued through April 28, when 20 people were killed.

From April 25 to May 5, members of Chen Mechan searched homes of surviving civilians in Butte Boyer neighborhood, looking for 400 Mawozo supporters. The raids were paused temporarily on April 29, when Haitian authorities entered the area and paused the conflict. Clashes resumed between 400 Mawozo and Chen Mechan on May 2, when the former consolidated control of neighborhoods originally under Chen Mechan control since 2017. Haitian authorities intervened a second time, forcing 400 Mawozo to stop gaining territory, but not giving up its new acquisitions.

Seven members of Chen Mechan, disillusioned with the fighting, expressed their notions to Celestin, and were executed.

== Aftermath ==
In total, 191 civilians were killed by the clashes and massacres by the two gangs, although the real total is unknown, due to many bodies having not been found. Ten members of Chen Mechan were killed, including the seven by Celestin. Haitian authorities arrested three people, including the leader of the 400 Mawozo-affiliated Baz 222 gang. The police also installed new checkpoints in Plaine du Cul-de-Sac following the clashes. Several weapons were seized as well.

In Butte Boyer, every house was searched and then destroyed by Chen Mechan. In other neighborhoods, eighty-one houses in total were destroyed in the fighting.

By June 27, 2022, there had been no trials of the three gang members arrested. The Haitian government had also not released a statement by that time. Chen Mechan members were still conducting raids in Plaine du Cul-de-Sac in late June, looking for 400 Mawozo informants. Many of the displaced fled to the Clericine public square, a majority of whom do not want to return.
