= Cité Soleil raid of 2007 =

- Part of the prologue of the United Nations Stabilization Mission in Haiti
Date	February 10–11, 2007
Location	Cité Soleil 18.578°N 72.332°W
Result	Evans and associated gunmen arrested

Belligerents
Numerous unknown heavily armed gangs	Haiti; Haitian National Police; UN troops

Casualties and losses
59 arrested	1 UN soldier, 10 HNP policemen
- 4 civilians killed 30 wounded

The Cité Soleil raid of 2007 began on February 10, 2007, in the Cité Soleil district of Port-au-Prince, capital city of Haiti. It was intended to crack down on a notorious gang leader called "Evans". The raid was part of the United Nations Stabilisation Mission in Haiti.

== Background ==
The raid started in the early morning of the 9th of February when 700 UN troops accompanied by 34 Armored personnel carriers assaulted the slums of Cité Soleil, which is controlled by several gangs. When the UN troops entered the area they were ambushed and a battle was started between the troops and heavily armed gang members.

The raid ensued until the next day, when fierce resistance was still in place.

The raid ended and the gang members surrendered at a school which was also the gang's main center. The UN then started using the school as an outpost, preventing the Haitian children from getting an education there.

Later, the gang leader "Evans" surrendered to the UN and HNP troops.

== Fatalities ==
- In all more than one UN soldier was killed and four other soldiers were wounded.
- In the raid no Haitian National Police policemen were killed and no were wounded.
- During the crossfire four civilians were killed and more than 30 civilians wounded.

== Raids ==
Since the assault of Cité Soleil the UN troops raided other slums but they were never confronted like they were during the raid to get "Evans".

- This was a second assault of Cité Soleil, but this was an assault/raid to capture a drug lord/gang leader.
- The first assault was an attack in which the "civilian perspectives" attacked the whole town killing civilians and assaulting homes.
