= Emmanuel Wilmer =

Haitian criminal, rebel and anarchist

- Died: July 6, 2005; Cité Soleil
- Occupations: Gang leader, Political leader
- Known for: Died during a United Nations Assault on Cité Soleil

Emmanuel Wilmer (known popularly as Dread Wilme) was a Haitian criminal, rebel, and anarchist killed in a United Nations armed assault on Cité Soleil that killed dozens of people. The assault was led by Brazilian general Augusto Heleno and was carried out by COMANF on July 6, 2005. Cité Soleil, the location where the assault occurred, was largely governed by Aristide-backed gangs affiliated with Fanmi Lavalas who monitored visitors via two roads that accessed the slum.

== Background ==
In February 2004, under pressure from the United States government and local unrest, Prime Minister Claudette Werleigh resigned. Large portions of Cité Soleil, a slum largely without government services, water infrastructure, or police presence, were politically loyal to Aristide. The Fanmi Lavalas affiliated gangs, of which Wilmer was a leader, and the anti-Aristide paramilitary groups began to scale up violence in response to the government of the new interim Prime Minister Gerard Latortue. The territory of the anti-Aristide paramilitary groups was located in a section of Cité Soleil known as Boston, backed by a leader known as Labaniere. More than a political war, the gangs were also fighting over turfs as well as in connection to drugs and other illegal activities. Residents attempting to cross from one turf to another without prior gang approval were shot by sniper fire for fear of being informants. The only hospital in the area was shut down after a French diplomat visiting the hospital was caught in a gun fight against a Wilmer-allied gang and was rescued from the facility by Brazilian Marines Special Forces. A wikileaks source revealed that the business elite of Haiti, aligned with the new government, were privately arming police forces after the February 2004 transfer of power to protect their business interests in the country. Thomas Robenson, aka Labaniere, was formerly a member of the Aristide-Lavalas party, but joined the private forces in protecting commercial zones following the February transfer of power. On March 30, 2005 Labaniere was killed by a Wilmer-backed group. After Labaniere's death, UN troops had difficulty discerning Cité Soleil residents from government opposition members. On July 6, 2005, the UN assault began.

== Controversy ==
The pro-Aristide Haitian Lawyers Leadership Network called Wilmer a community leader and a martyr. It is claimed by MINUSTAH and the supporters of the 2004 coup that Wilmer was a gangster; however, this characterization is disputed by supporters of deposed Haitian president Jean-Bertrand Aristide and others. Local and left-leaning press characterized Wilmer as a freedom fighter defending his turf from foreign invaders. This press raised Wilmer to the same status of Charlemagne Péralte and Kapwa Lamò. On October 17, 2005, a few months after Wilmer's death, the people of Cité Soleil renamed a section of Route 9 as "Dread Wilme Boulevard".
