= Jérémie Vespers =

1964 massacre in Haiti

Coordinates: 18.65°N 74.116°W

The term Jérémie Vespers refers to a massacre that took place in August, September and October 1964 in the Haitian town of Jérémie. It took place after a group of 13 young Haitians calling themselves "Jeune Haiti" landed on August 6, 1964, at Petite-Rivière-de-Dame-Marie with the intention of overthrowing the regime of François 'Papa Doc' Duvalier.

The victims were killed one by one by the Haitian Army, until the last two survivors, Louis Drouin and Marcel Numa, were captured alive, brought back to Port-au-Prince and shot in public against a cemetery wall on November 12, 1964.

== Terminology ==
The massacre was called the "vespers" because many of the families killed by the regime are remembered as the families who took many aforementioned "vesper" picnic excursions.

== Victims ==
Several of the group were from the town of Jérémie. During two months that the army and the resistance group fought in the hills, the regime ordered the arrest and murder of Jeune Haiti's family members. 27 people were murdered, ranging in age from 85-year-old Mrs Chenier Villedrouin to 2-year-old Régine Sansaricq.

The murdered were:

- Louis Drouin Sr., father of Louis Drouin Jr.
- Louise Degraff, his wife
- Guy Drouin, brother of Louis Drouin Jr.
- Alice Drouin, sister of Louis Drouin Jr.
- Gérard Guilbaud, Alice's husband
- Mrs. Chenier Villedrouin (née Corinne Sansaricq) (85 years old), mother of Guy and Victor Villedrouin
- Victor Villedrouin
- Roseline Drouin, Guy Villedrouin's wife and sister of Louis Drouin Jr.
- Fernande Villedrouin, sister of Guy and Victor
- Guy Villedrouin, brother of Victor Villedrouin
- Adeline Chassagne, Victor Villedrouin's wife, and the aunt of Canadian indie rock band Arcade Fire's Régine Chassagne
- Lisa Villedrouin (18 years old), their daughter
- Frantz Villedrouin (16 years old) their son
- Pierre Sansaricq
- Louise Laforest, Pierre's wife
- Jean-Claude Sansaricq, their son
- Graziela Sansaricq, Jean-Claude's wife
- Lily Sansaricq, sister of Pierre Sansaricq
- Fred Sansaricq, son of Pierre
- Hubert Sansaricq, son of Pierre
- Reynold Sansaricq, son of Pierre
- Marie-Catherine Sansaricq (10 years old) daughter of Pierre
- Edith Laforest, Louise Laforest's sister
- Jean-Pierre Sansaricq (6 years old), son of Jean-Claude and Graziela
- Stéphane Sansaricq (4 years old), son of Jean-Claude and Graziela
- Régine Sansaricq (2 years old), daughter of Jean-Claude and Graziela
- Pierre-Richard Sansaricq
- Alphonze Bazile, son of Pierre and Vesta Bazile

== See also ==
- Crime in Haiti
- Fort Dimanche
- Volontaires de la Sécurité Nationale (Haitian secret police)
- Bishop Guy Sansaricq, the Catholic bishop whose cousins were among the victims and who opposed the Duvalier regime
