= Jimmy Chérizier =

Haitian gang leader (born 1977)

- Babekyou (Haitian Creole)
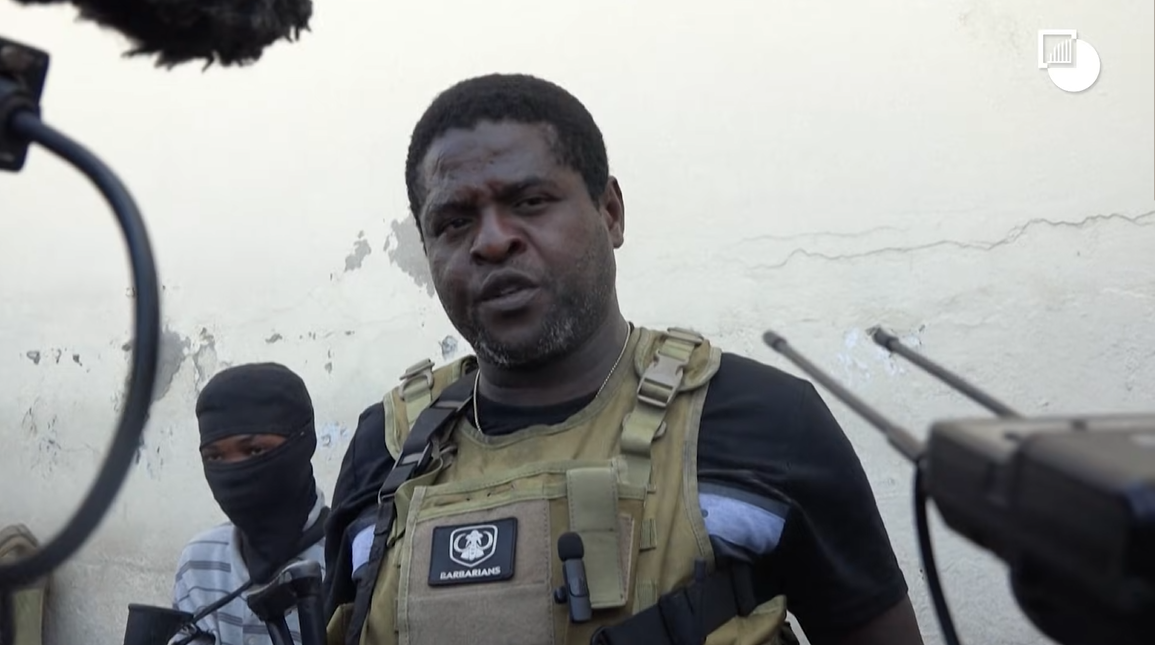
- Chérizier in 2025
- Born: 30 March 1977 (age 49); Delmas, Haiti
- Other name: Barbecue
- Organization(s): Revolutionary Forces of the G9 Family and Allies; Viv Ansanm and allies
- Title: Leader of Revolutionary Forces of the G9 Family and Allies
- Term: Since June 2020
- Predecessor: Office established

Jimmy Chérizier (French pronunciation: [dʒimi ʃeʁizje]; born 30 March 1977), nicknamed Barbecue (Haitian Creole: Babekyou), is a Haitian rebel, gang leader, former policeman, and warlord who is the head of the Revolutionary Forces of the G9 Family and Allies (Haitian Creole: Fòs Revolisyonè G9 an Fanmi e Alye), abbreviated as "G9" or "FRG9", a federation of over a dozen Haitian gangs and armed groups based in Port-au-Prince. Known for often making public appearances in military camouflage and a beret, he calls himself the leader of an "armed revolution". Considered the most powerful warlord in Haiti, he is currently believed to be one of the country's strongest political figures.

In early March 2024, the FRG9 staged the largest jailbreak in Haitian history and escalated attacks across the country, including an attempted siege of the Toussaint Louverture International Airport. Chérizier claimed responsibility for the attacks and stated that the goal was to capture key government institutions, overthrow acting Prime Minister Ariel Henry and become more powerful in Haiti, warning that "if Ariel Henry doesn't step down and the international community continues to support him, they will lead us directly to a civil war which will end in genocide." Henry resigned the following month.

== Early life and career ==
Jimmy Chérizier was born in Delmas, Ouest, which is located in the Port-au-Prince Arrondissement, next to the slums of La Saline, Port-au-Prince. He was one of eight children. His father died when he was five years old. Chérizier's mother worked as a fried chicken vendor during his childhood, which he claims to be the origin of his nickname "Barbecue"; others, however, claim it originated from allegations of him setting people on fire during massacres, which he denies.

Chérizier was a police officer for the Haitian National Police. Chérizier belonged to the Unité Départementale pour le Maintien de l'Ordre (UDMO, "Unit for the Maintenance of Order"), a special unit within the Haitian National Police. While he was a police officer, Chérizier is alleged to have perpetrated the 2018 La Saline massacre in which at least 71 people were killed and over 400 homes burned down. He is accused of being involved in the 2017 Grande Ravine massacre that killed at least nine people, and the 2020 Bel Air massacre. In December 2018, Chérizier was fired by the Haitian National Police. Chérizier has denied all allegations and claims he was in Delmas 6 at the time of the purported massacre. Chérizier became a gang leader in Base Delmas 6, Delmas, Ouest, where he is accused of perpetrating further massacres.

== Leader of Viv Ansanm ==
Chérizier is the leader of Viv Ansanm, a coalition of gangs formed in Haiti in September 2023 from the Revolutionary Forces of the G9 Family and Allies (G9, Haitian Creole: Fòs Revolisyonè G9 an Fanmi e Alye), a self-described federation of rebel groups, and G-Pép. G9 was originally composed of nine groups and grew to include over a dozen by 2022. The formation of the G9 was announced by Chérizier in a YouTube video on 10 June 2020 in the aftermath of the Bel Air massacre.

The G9 is one of about 95 rebellious factions that battled for supremacy in Port-au-Prince. Its stronghold was believed to be in Delmas. As of July 2021, it controlled Martissant, Village de Dieu, Grande Ravine, Bel Air, Cité Soleil, Fort Dimanche, and many other areas in Port-au-Prince. These areas give the G9 a hold over the center of Port-au-Prince, as well as northern and southern access points to its metropolitan area, which allow the G9 to isolate Port-au-Prince from the rest of Haiti at its will.

On 12 May 2021, Chérizier was reportedly wounded during a gunfight with a rival group. A Doctors Without Borders facility in Martissant, Port-au-Prince, denied rumors that he had received medical treatment at the facility.

By 2024, Viv Ansanm was fully operational and began launching serious attacks in Port-au-Prince and elsewhere in the country.

=== Alleged 2021 massacres ===
The G9 has allegedly been responsible for numerous massacres of civilians in Haiti. These include a May 2020 massacre across various neighborhoods across Port-au-Prince that killed 6 to 34 people, an August–September 2020 massacre that left 22 dead, and an April 2021 massacre after an attempted takeover of Bel Air in Port-au-Prince.

The National Human Rights Defense Network (RNDDH), a United States National Endowment for Democracy funded, self-described human rights group based in Haiti, reported on the 2020–21 massacre in Bel Air allegedly committed by G9. Eighty-one people were killed in total. Thirty-six people were killed from August to December 2020 and 45 people from March to May 2021. 18 people were left missing. A massacre in Cité Soleil from January to May 2021, which the RNDDH alleges was done by the G9 but the G9 denies, killed 44 people and left seven missing. Human rights groups and victims have described the G9's tactics to include random killing of civilians, systematic rape, looting and torching villages, kidnapping, dismemberment and more.

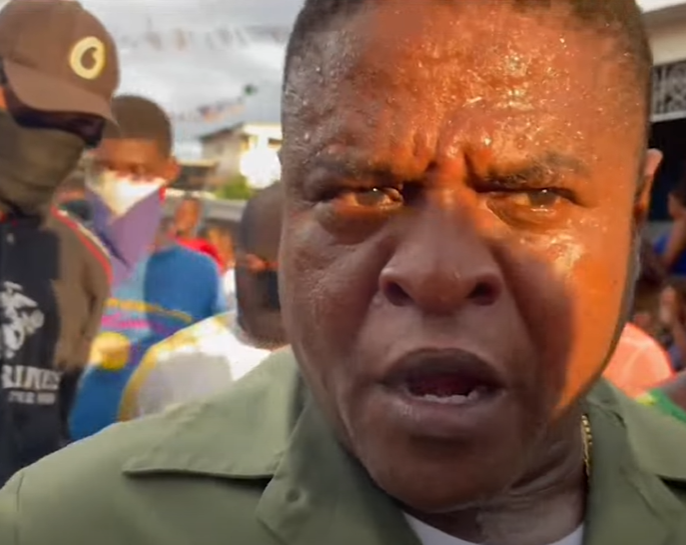
Chérizier in 2023

=== Relationship with President Jovenel Moïse ===
In investigating the Bel Air massacre and the 2021 Cité Soleil massacre, RNDDH reported that Haitian National Police officers did not intervene in the massacres after failing to receive orders from superiors and did not file any police reports on witness testimony, and that judicial authorities claimed to have received no complaints from any massacre victims. The RNDDH received reports that police equipment was used to conduct the massacres. It is alleged by some Haitians that President Jovenel Moïse was responsible for the massacres, using Chérizier's gang to repress government dissidents.

In the weeks leading up to the 7 July 2021 assassination of Jovenel Moïse, the United Nations described gang violence as peaking at "unprecedented levels," and gang violence had caused a mass exodus of several thousands of people from Port-au-Prince. On 23 June Chérizier declared that the G9 gang collective would lead an armed revolution against Haiti's business and political elites. He described the G9 as filling the void left by government weakness and a force "to deliver Haiti from the opposition, the government, and the Haitian bourgeoisie." He gave this statement to local media outlets surrounded by gang members wielding machetes and guns, and the statement was posted on YouTube. Chérizier publicly demanded Moïse's resignation from office a week before the assassination, calling for a "national dialogue" to redefine Haiti. In the aftermath of the assassination, Chérizier publicly mourned Moïse, including leading a crowd of more than 1,000 demonstrators calling for justice against the perpetrators.

=== 2022 gang war between G9 and G-Pèp ===
Beginning in July 2022, the G9 engaged in a war with rival gang G-Pèp for the control of Cité Soleil. The resulting 2022 Port-au-Prince gang war left at least 50 people dead.

=== September–November 2022 Varreux fuel terminal blockade ===
On 12 September 2022, during the fuel shortages part of the 2022 Haitian crisis, the G9 seized control of the Varreux fuel terminal, the main gas terminal in Port-au-Prince and one of Haiti's main fuel terminals. The G9 blockaded access to the terminal, cutting fuel supplies of about 10 million gallons of diesel and gasoline, and more than 800,000 gallons of kerosene to the rest of Haiti. The blockade caused gas stations and schools to close, hospitals to reduce services due to running on limited power, and banks and grocery stores to run on a limited schedule.

Initially, Chérizier demanded the resignation of President and Prime Minister Ariel Henry as conditions for the end of the blockade. After Henry requested foreign military aid to end the blockade, Chérizier changed his demands, to receive amnesty for arrest warrants issued for crimes allegedly committed by himself and other G9 members. In an interview, Jean Rebel Dorcénat of the Haitian government's National Commission for Disarmament, Demobilization and Reintegration said that the G9 also demanded government positions within Henry's cabinet. After negotiations with Henry, the G9 ended the blockade in November.

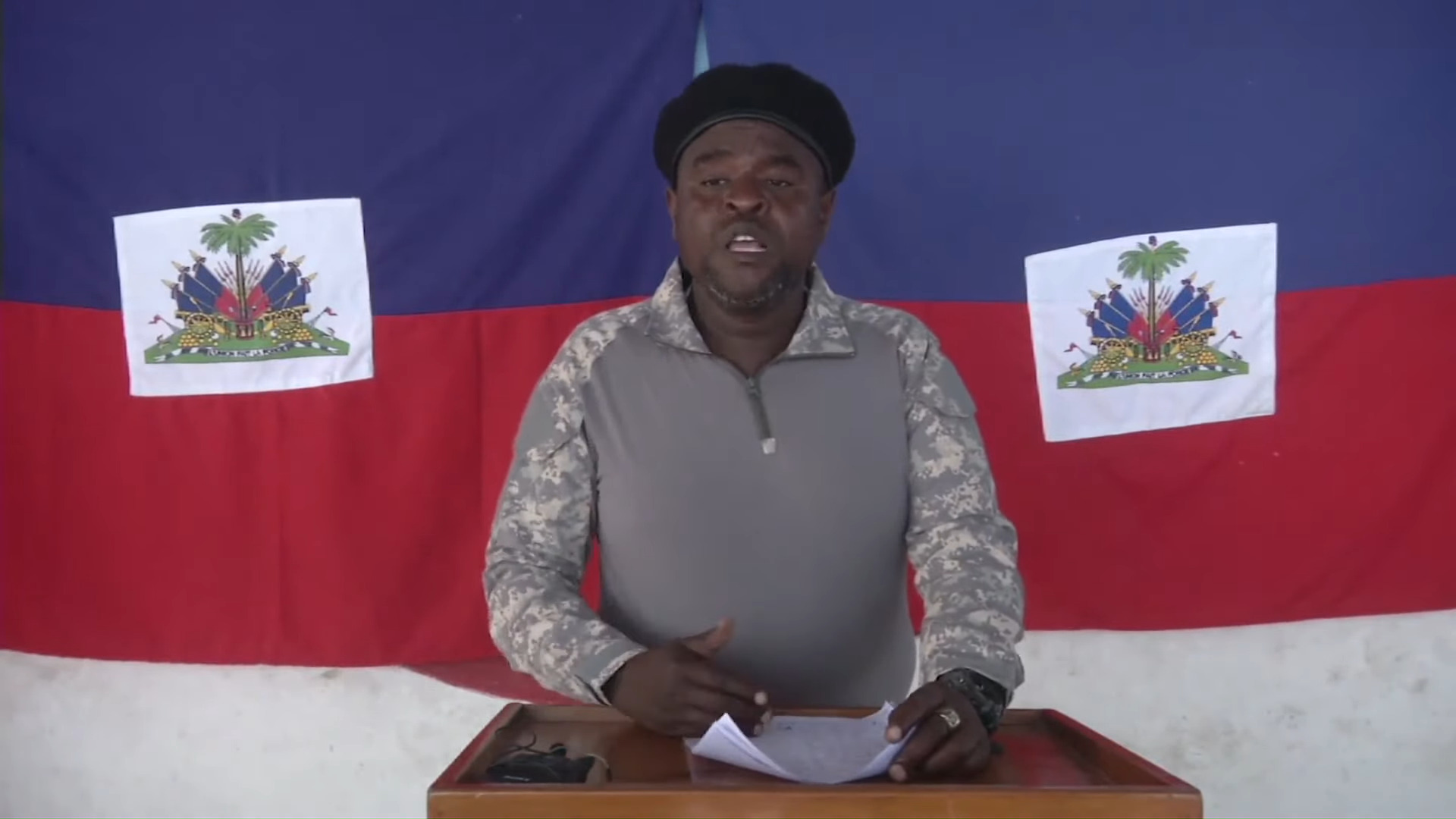
Chérizier making a speech in 2024

=== 2024 jailbreak ===
In March 2024, Chérizier claimed responsibility for orchestrating attacks that led to the escape of over 4,700 inmates from Haiti's two largest prisons and killed around a dozen people. Francisco Uribe, one of the few detainees who chose not to leave prison, said in a video posted to social media that "They are massacring people indiscriminately inside the cells". The prison attacks were followed by the storming of Toussaint Louverture International Airport, which was repelled by security. Chérizier stated that the goal was to capture Haiti's police chief and government ministers and to prevent Henry's return to Haiti.

The Associated Press reported that the gangs controlled around 80% of the capital city and were launching coordinated attacks on "once unthinkable targets like the Central Bank". A state of emergency was declared on 3 March. Amid the growing unrest, Chérizier declared former Haitian dictator François Duvalier as an inspiration and warned that if the international community continued supporting the unelected Henry, a full-scale civil war would be inevitable. On 12 March, Henry yielded to the pressure and declared his resignation. By this point, Chérizier was described by certain journalists as a "warlord" and one of the most powerful figures in Haiti; however, he declared in television interviews that he was currently not interested in becoming president of Haiti.

In an October 2024 interview with the journalist Michael Deibert, Chérizier asked for the Kenyan-led "multinational force to leave the country, because it is a group of invaders who just came under the orders of the United States, Canada, and France. They have not come to solve the country's problems."

== Sanctions ==
On 10 December 2020, the United States Department of the Treasury imposed sanctions on Chérizier and two senior Haitian government officials who allegedly provided police equipment, guns, and vehicles for massacres against the Haitian people. On 21 October 2022, the United Nations Security Council unanimously imposed its first sanctions on Haiti in five years (Resolution 2653), establishing a one-year travel ban, asset freeze and arms embargo on Jimmy Chérizier and other persons or entities designated by a newly established Security Council sanctions committee. On May 2, 2025, the United States designated Viv Ansanm a Foreign Terrorist Organization (FTO) and Specially Designated Global Terrorists (SDGTs). Then on August 12, 2025, the United States filed criminal charges against Chérizier as the leader of Viv Ansanm and for circumventing sanctions, issuing a $5 million reward for his arrest.

== See also ==
- 400 Mawozo
