= Konbit Soley Leve =

Haitian social movement

Konbit Soley Leve (English: Rising Sun Collective) is a social movement that was founded in Cité Soleil in June 2011 by the city's residents. Its mission is to work to help the people of Cité Soleil better their lives, largely through the model of a traditional Haitian labor cooperative called a konbit.

== Origins ==
The movement was founded by 6 neighborhoods within Cité Soleil: La Difference (also as Twa Bebe), La Reference (also known as Bwa Nef), Ti Ayiti/Projet Lintho 1, Norway, Bo Gadrie/Soley 9, and Vodrey (in rural Cité Soleil). The initial meeting of these neighborhoods, which was the precursor to the founding of the movement, was facilitated by Future Generations, but the movement has no NGO or government body officially supporting it. The movement grew quickly in the first 6–8 months of its existence, and currently includes dozens of neighborhoods from nearly every area of Cité Soleil.

== Philosophy ==
Konbit Soley Leve is not an official organization, and therefore does not undertake activities like a typical organization. It is horizontal in its structure, and initiatives are decided by consensus at open weekly meetings. The movement acts as an umbrella under which groups from different neighborhoods of Cité Soleil can come together to pursue common goals.

The movement's activities are financed by contributions of local residents of the participating neighborhoods. Its activities are primarily in the domains of civic education, civic action (volunteer street cleaning, neighborhood beautification campaigns, etc.), environmental preservation, and sustainable livelihood creation. One of the most visible forms of activities is the konbit, in which residents of many different neighborhoods come together to help one neighborhood solve a problem, such as a flooded canal.

Overall, Soley Leve is considered a philosophy as much as a movement. The philosophy is based on the principles of interdependence (neighborhoods working together), self-realization (that the community is in charge of its destiny), self-reliance (that Cité Soleil does not need to be dependent upon outsiders), and empowerment (that the residents of Cité Soleil have the potential to change their own situations). Anyone who conducts activities in accordance with those principles is considered to be a part of the Soley Leve movement, whether or not they attend the open weekly meetings.
