= Jean-Rabel massacre =

1987 massacre in Haiti

The Jean-Rabel massacre took place in Haiti on 23 July 1987, near the town of Jean-Rabel. At least 139 people were killed (one of the self-proclaimed assassins claimed 1042). It was carried out by "paramilitary groups led by macoutes and acting upon the alleged orders from a local land oligarch, Rémy Lucas".

Several days earlier Henri Namphy had visited the area and "publicly supported the Lucas family and their rights to the land they claimed". Many of the dead were members of the Tet Ansamn land reform group.

Arrest warrants were finally issued on 13 September 1995, and in January and February 1999, Rémy Lucas, Léonard Lucas and Jean-Michel Richardson were detained for a short period.

== See also ==
- List of massacres in Haiti
