= 2022 Cabaret attack =

Gang attacks in Haiti

- Part of Gang war in Haiti
- Location: Cabaret, Haiti
- Date: November 28–29, 2022
- Deaths: 20+
- Perpetrators: Base 5 Secondes gang and Canaan gang

Between November 29 and 30, 2022, 20 people were killed by armed gangs in the town of Cabaret, a suburb of the Haitian capital of Port-au-Prince.

== Context ==
Suffering from gang violence since the mid-2010's, the crisis in Haiti was exacerbated in 2021 following the assassination of President Jovenel Moïse. Most of the gang violence took place in Port-au-Prince, the capital, and occasionally spread to other localities, including Cabaret. In Cabaret, prior to the attack, the mayor claimed that the police with the aid of residents kicked the gangsters out of the town. Civilians were also appointed as guards to aid the police. Two gangs in particular were responsible, the Base 5 Secondes gang and Canaan gang, both of which were subject to the anti-gang removals by the Cabaret police. The primary reason the town of Cabaret and its surrounding villages are strategic for gang interests is the presence of the Lafiteau Port, the surrounding industrial area, and the highway connection to Port-au-Prince. Due to the violence prior to the ejections, the port had been unable to operate and civilians were often the target of extrajudicial killings by gangs.

== Attack ==
The two gangs returned to Cabaret on the night between November 29 and 30, and attacked civilians. The acting mayor of the town, Joseph Jeanson Guillaume, stated that the gangs acted with "unparalled cruelty." The morning after the attack, the bodies of twelve civilians were discovered, and dozens of homes were set on fire. The number of dead increased to over 20, as more carnage was discovered.

== Aftermath ==
In response to the attack, Guillaume called on Haiti's National Police to intervene against the gangs.
