= Haitian American Sugar Company =

Sugar company

Haitian American Sugar Company, S.A.
- Company type: Private
- Founded: August 5, 1912; 113 years ago
- Founder: Charles Steinheim; John Christie; Franck Corpay
- Defunct: April 1987; 39 years ago
- Headquarters: Port-au-Prince, Haiti
- Key people: Fritz Mevs, Sr
- Products: Sugar

Haitian American Sugar Company, S.A. (HASCO) was an American business venture which sought to produce and sell sugar and other goods in Haiti and the United States. The company was registered with a capital of five million dollars on 5 August 1912 in Wilmington, Delaware, by Charles Steinheim, John A. Christie, and Franck Corpay.

== Political unrest in Haiti ==
Hasco's operation was threatened by political turmoil in Haiti in the years leading up to 1915. The danger to HASCO and other American business interests in Haiti was one of the factors which led to the U.S. Marine invasion of the country in 1915 and the continued U.S. occupation until 1934.

== Closure ==
In 1987, the company closed, citing smuggling of sugar from the Dominican Republic which did not pay a government tax and made domestic sugar uncompetitive. At the time of the closing, Hasco was Haiti's second-largest employer with 3,500 workers at the Port-au-Prince refinery and 30–40,000 contracted cane farmers.
