= Jeune Haiti =

Jeune Haiti ("Young Haiti") was a group of Haitian exiles active in New York during the 1960s. In 1964 they launched an unsuccessful attempt to overthrow the regime of François Duvalier, also known as Papa Doc.

== 1964 overthrow attempt ==
Thirteen young Haitians calling themselves "Jeune Haiti" landed on August 5 or 6th 1964 at Petite-Rivière-de-Dame-Marie, Haiti, with the intention of overthrowing the Duvalier regime. The group consisted of Max Armand, his brother Jacques Armand, Gérald Marie Brierre, Miko Chandler, Louis Drouin, Charles Forbin, Jean Gerdes, Réginald Jourdan, Yvon Laraque, Marcel Numa, Roland Rigaud, Gusle Villedrouin and Jacques Wadestrandt.

Over the next three months, eleven members were killed in combat with the thousands of members of Haiti's army sent to capture them; the other two were captured and executed. The last survivors of the group had walked over 200 km between landing at Dame-Marie in August and their final stand at Ravine à Roche in October.

Shortly after the landing, Yvan Laraque, was shot and killed in the area of Chambellan, near the town of Jérémie which Jeune Haiti was attempting to reach. The regime placed his body on public display for several days on a major Port-au-Prince street, accompanied by the sign "Welcome to Haiti".

On September 8, Gérald Brièrre (the head of the group), Charles Alfred Forbin and Jacques Wadestrandt were killed at Dallest in a firefight against the USMC trained "bataillon tactique".

On September 14, Jacques and Max Armand were killed at Pic Formand.

On September 27, Marcel Numa was arrested at the Coteaux public market where he had come disguised as a peasant, to buy food for his comrades.

On September 29, at Martinet, Jean Gerdès and Mirko Chandler were wounded in battle. Chandler reportedly asked Jourdan, his best friend, to kill him, while Gerdès committed suicide.

The four survivors began to march east, possibly to reach the Dominican Republic. Louis Drouin was wounded on October 16 and taken prisoner.

On October 26, Guslé Villedrouin, Roland Rigaud and Réginald (Bobby) Jourdan were killed during a gunfight at Ravine à Roche, near the town of l’Asile.

Louis Drouin and Marcel Numa, who had both been captured alive after running out of ammunition, were brought to Port-au-Prince on a Haitian coast guard PT boat. On November 12, 1964, the local schools were shut and principals ordered to bring their students to witness their execution. Drouin and Numa were shot to death by firing squad against the wall of the national cemetery.

== The Jérémie Vespers ==
Several of the group were from the town of Jérémie, and the regime ordered reprisals against their family members. Between August and October 1964 at least 27 people ranging from 2 to 85 years old were murdered in a massacre called the Jérémie Vespers. The true number of people murdered in the Jérémie Vespers may be in the hundreds. Many others were not killed, but were imprisoned, raped, tortured and expelled from the region. Several local families, including the Sansaricq and Drouin families, were wiped out.

== Impact ==
Although the force consisted of only thirteen fighters, they had some military success and were initially seen by the regime as posing a real threat. Brenda Gayle Plummer notes that the fighters “fought ten engagements [and] downed a Haitian military plane”, and argued that the invasion "marked the last time that filibusters truly threatened the regime, although coup attempts continued".

Haitian journalist and political activist Raymond Alcide Joseph cited the public executions of Drouin and Numa as having changed the course of his life:

"When Papa Doc declared a national holiday, closed the schools, and brought the children out to watch the execution, I didn’t see any further need for me to work for a PhD and go back home. I decided right then and there to put my knowledge to work fighting the regime, and I came to New York in 1965 to help organize the Haitians."
