= Revolutionary Forces of the G9 Family and Allies =

Haitian federation of 12 armed gangs

- Forces Révolutionnaires de la Famille G9 et Alliés; Fòs Revolisyonè G9 an Fanmi e Alye
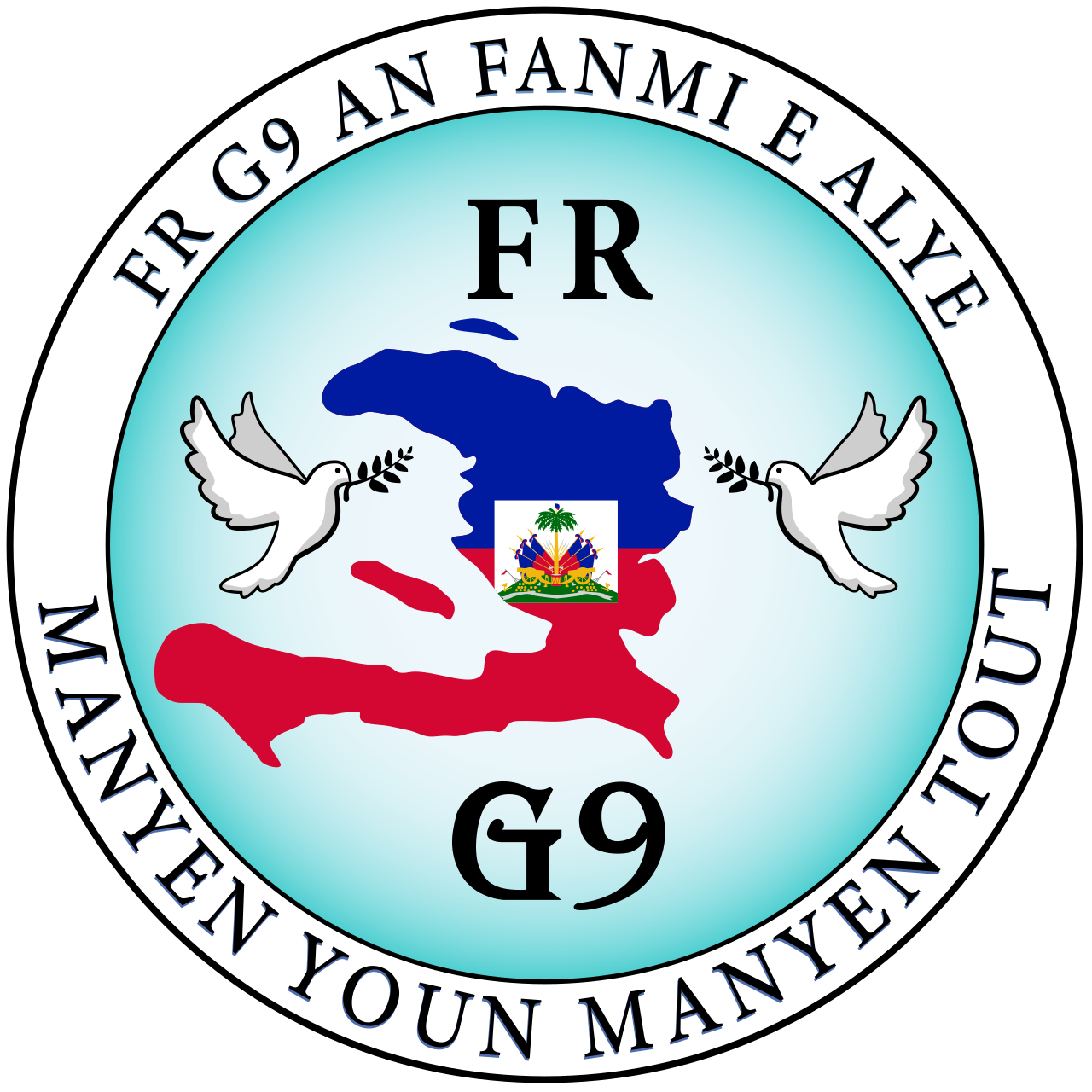
- Logo of the Revolutionary Forces of the G9 Family and Allies
- Founded: June 2020
- Founder: Jimmy Chérizier
- Years active: June 2020–present
- Territory: Large segments of Port-au-Prince, Haiti
- Ethnicity: Haitians
- Activities: Assassinations, Political agitation, Voter intimidation, Murder, Smuggling, Drug trafficking, Kidnapping, Extortion
- Allies: Zoe Pound, Zoe Nation, Zoe Mafia Family Haitian Tèt Kale Party (Formerly, Until 2021; Denied)

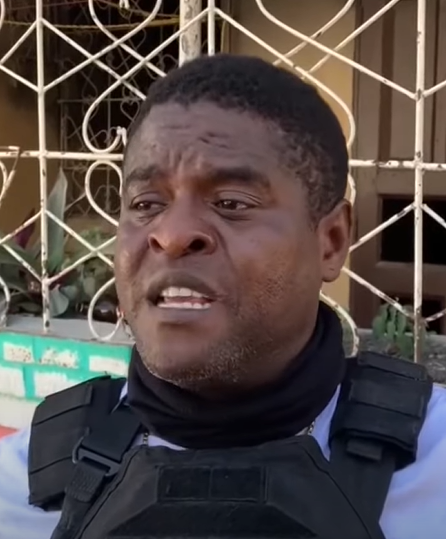
Jimmy Chérizier, the founder of G9, pictured in January 2024

The Revolutionary Forces of the G9 Family and Allies (French: Forces Révolutionnaires de la Famille G9 et Alliés, Haitian Creole: Fòs Revolisyonè G9 an Fanmi e Alye) is a federation of over a dozen armed criminal gangs led by former Haitian police officer Jimmy "Barbecue" Chérizier, notorious for extrajudicial massacres. The G9, along with other affiliated armed groups in Viv Ansanm, control over 80% of the capital Port-au-Prince.

In March 2024, the group was involved in a jailbreak that led to more than 4,700 prisoners escaping, resulting in the resignation of Prime Minister Ariel Henry.

== History ==
The G9 Family was founded by Chérizier in June 2020, with his own armed group, the Delmas 95, being one of the founding members. The G9 alliance originally had nine armed groups as members, but had expanded to over a dozen, per a UN report in 2022.

The G9 had a rivalry with the G-Pèp, an armed group supportive of the Haitian Government. In 2022, clashes between it and G-Pèp led to "at least 50 dead and more than 50 wounded" in just 4 days in Port-au-Prince.

On February 29, 2024, the G9 family set aside its rivalry with the G-Pèp and formed a coalition: Viv Ansanm.

== Activities ==
The G9 had a relationship with assassinated Haitian President Jovenel Moïse, having received weapons, police uniforms, and other support even after Chérizier's dismissal from the police force. The G9 also has a rivalry with fellow Haitian miltant group G-Pèp, having fought with them. The group is well-armed and capable of using unmanned aerial vehicles. They have access to a variety of illegal weapons, mostly from the United States, giving them more firepower than the police.

The G9 has been described as a gang and criminal enterprise by international media, and had been alleged to participate in criminal activities such as drug trafficking. In turn, the research scientist of the Journal of Intelligence, Conflict, and Warfare Millie Harron has argued that "G9 is not, in fact, a gang, and can instead be more accurately understood under a "new typology of violent hybrid actors", in what has been characterized as an amalgamation of an organized criminal syndicate, a gang, and a terrorist organization.

== See also ==
- 2026 in Haiti
- Haitian crisis (2018–present)
- Timeline of gang-related events in Haiti
- Viv Ansanm
