= 2018 La Saline massacre =

2018 massacre in Port-au-Prince, Haiti

2018 Port-au-Prince massacre
- Location: 18.56°N 72.34°W; La Saline, Port-au-Prince, Haiti
- Date: 13–18 November 2018 around 15:00 (UTC−05:00)
- Attack type: Mass shooting, mass sexual assault
- Weapons: Automatic weapons, fire, machetes, rocks
- Deaths: 71 civilians

On 13 November 2018, a massacre began within the La Saline slums of Port-au-Prince, Haiti. According to reports, at least 71 civilians were killed over a 24-hour period. It is alleged that the killings were either due to local gang wars or the actions of Haitian officials attempting to quell anti-corruption protests.

== Background ==
In October 2017, UN peacekeepers ended their mission in Haiti after 13 years. Since the departure of the UN, the number of gang-controlled areas in the city has apparently grown.

The massacre occurred in the middle of various protests within Haiti: Jovenel Moïse was elected president in November 2016, but protestors saw him as corrupt.

== Incident ==
Witness reports state that a police truck carrying uniformed men arrived in Port-au-Prince's La Saline slums at around 3 pm on 13 November 2018. The men then opened fire upon civilians, while local gang members killed others with gunfire and machetes. According to witnesses, as well as a human-rights group, at least 21 men were killed in the massacre. A local human-rights group, Fondasyon Je Klere, estimated that between 15 and 25 people were killed.

== Arrests ==
According to police, one person has been arrested in connection with the killings.

== Identity of perpetrators ==
Fondasyon Je Klere suggested links between armed gangs, corrupt police officers and government officials may point towards the perpetrators of the massacre. Those who witnessed the massacre alleged that the killers may have been corrupt police officers, leading the National Police chief to suspend two officers accused of involvement in the killings.

== Responses ==
The United Nations has launched an investigation into the killings. In December 2020, the United States Office of Foreign Assets Control announced sanctions against Jimmy Chérizier, a former officer who became a gang leader, Fednel Monchery, and Joseph Pierre Richard Duplan, two officials in the Moise administration, for their alleged involvement in the massacre.
