= Jean Renel Sénatus =

Haitian politician

Jean Renel Sénatus is a Haitian politician serving in the Senate for the Ouest Department. Sénatus nickname is "Zokiki". Sénatus is a member of the Commission for Ethics and Morality and is well known for his opinions on these subjects. In 2016 Sénatus heavily criticized the television series Glee and Amor à Vida for promoting "bad manners", putting "Haitian families in danger" and "undermin[ing] the morality and ... harm[ing] youth".
