= 400 Mawozo =

Haitian gang

- Founded: c. 2020
- Years active: c. 2020–present
- Territory: Ganthier, Tabarre and Pétion-Ville, Port-au-Prince, Haiti
- Ethnicity: Haitian
- Membership (est.): 300
- Leader: Wilson Joseph "Lanmò San Jou"
- Activities: Murder, rape, kidnapping, extortion
- Allies: G-Pèp
- Rivals: Bwa kale vigilantes; Haitian National Police; Haitian Armed Forces; Zoe Pound

The 400 Mawozo is a prominent gang in Haiti, mainly based in Ganthier and in the Port-au-Prince suburbs of Tabarre and Pétion-Ville. It largely consists of deportees, former leaders of opposition groups, former smugglers and police officers. In 2022, it aligned itself with "G-Pèp" after its leader was extradited to the United States. It came to international attention in October 2021 when it kidnapped U.S. citizens acting as missionaries in Port-au-Prince.

== Description ==
The gang's name, loosely translated from Haitian Creole, means 400 simpletons, or untrained men. Although kidnappings have been its new trade, the gang is known for threatening the use of rape and assassination to maintain power over areas. According to former Haitian Senator Jean Renel Senatus, who headed the justice and security commission and had received death threats from 400 Mawozo, the gang was originally called "Texas" and was known for holding up residents and stealing motorcycles. Their alleged leader is Wilson Joseph who goes by the nickname "Lanmò San Jou" or "Lanmò Sanjou," which literally means "death knows no days." He flaunted the arrest warrant against him in online videos detailing his group's crimes. The group's second-in-command is Joly "Yonyon" Germine, who is currently incarcerated.

== Kidnappings ==
On 16 October 2021, 17 Christian missionaries from the Ohio-based Christian Aid Ministries were abducted by 400 Mawozo. Typically, after a kidnapping the gang makes a demand for a ransom. In a previous kidnapping in April 2021, the group demanded $1 million apiece for the release of Catholic missionaries. On 16 December the Haitian justice minister announced that all the captives had been freed. Later it was found out that they had escaped. Several of the captives had been freed in earlier weeks.

On 7 November 2022, the United States Department of State announced reward offers of up to US$1,000,000 each for information leading to the arrest or conviction of Lanmò Sanjou and two other Haitian gang leaders—Jermaine Stephenson, or Gaspiyay; and Vitel'Homme Innocent—for their roles in the kidnappings. Innocent was added to the Federal Bureau of Investigation's list of Most Wanted Fugitives in November 2023. On 16 May 2025, the gang's leader, Germine Joly, was convicted by a jury in the United States over the mass-kidnapping in 2021.

On 13 March 2024, YourFellowArab (Addison Pierre Maalouf), a YouTube personality known for touring dangerous places, was kidnapped on his way to interview Jimmy Chérizier. Members of the 400 Mawozo gang demanded a ransom of $600,000 for his release. The U.S. State Department confirmed that a U.S. citizen had been kidnapped. Maalouf was released unharmed later that month.

== 2022 gang war ==
In April–May 2022, clashes between the rival gangs, 400 Mawozo and Chen Mechan, occurred in the Plain of the Cul-de-Sac area. In December 2023, Joseph Wilson and three other gang leaders, including Vitel'Homme Innocent, became subject to UN sanctions.

According to Insight Crime, 400 Mawozo was feared in 2022 because of their innovative methods, in particular "express kidnapping", but also for the "high-powered weaponry, participation criminal economies, and political connections" which permit all gangs to prosper in Haiti. In 2022, their control of Croix-des-Bouquets extended to the prison, the voting station, and the only route connecting Port-au-Prince to the north of the island. In addition to truck hijackings, they are involved in smuggling contraband and the traffic of drugs, arms, and people along the border with the Dominican Republic. On 1 February 2024, Joly Germine, the self-proclaimed "king" of the 400 Mawozo gang, pleaded guilty in a U.S. federal court to smuggling arms such as "AK-47s, AR-15s, an M4 carbine rifle, an M1A rifle, and a .50 caliber rifle, described by the ATF as a military weapon," into Haiti, piloting the operation from a Haitian prison.

== 2026 destruction of alleged headquarters ==
After sending 2,000 troops to Haiti to reinforce the Gang Suppression Force in October 2026 in response to the kidnapping of four Salvadoran technicians, Nayib Bukele released footage on 10 November 2026 of the aerial destruction of what he referred to as the headquarters of 400 Mawozo. The intelligence which led to the identification of the residence of Wilson Joseph (Lanmò San jou) was furnished by anonymous sources on the social network X.

== See also ==
- Gang war in Haiti
- Haitian crisis
- 2024 Haitian jailbreak
- List of mass kidnappings
