= 2024 Pont-Sondé attack =

Gang attack in Haiti

- Part of the gang war in Haiti
- Location: 19.1493°N 72.6147°W; Pont-Sondé, Haiti
- Date: 3 October 2024
- Target: Haitian police personnel, civilians
- Attack type: Shooting, arson, stabbing
- Weapon: Automatic assault rifles · knives · fire
- Deaths: 115+
- Injuries: 50+
- Perpetrator: Gran Grif

On 3 October 2024, the town of Pont-Sondé, Haiti, was the site of a massacre perpetrated by the Gran Grif gang, leaving at least 115 people dead and at least 50 injured. Thousands more fled the town after the attack, which is part of the ongoing gang war in Haiti.

== Background ==
The Gran Grif gang operates in the department of Artibonite and is considered one of Haiti's cruelest gangs, with nine mass kidnappings attributed to the group between October 2023 and January 2024. The gang was formed after former legislator Prophane Victor began arming young men nearly a decade ago to secure his election and control the area. Both Victor and the gang's current leader Luckson Elan, have also been sanctioned by the United States in September 2024 and by the United Nations Security Council. Rumors of an impending attack on the town had been circulating since August 2024, after the gang accused residents of collaborating with a self-defense group called "The Coalition" and hindering the operations of a makeshift toll established by the gang on a road and issued a warning on social media.

== Attack ==
The incident occurred on the morning of 3 October. The attackers, who had come from Savien, entered the town using canoes and met little resistance from the police. At least 115 people died and at least 50 people were injured; 16 of them, including two gang members, were seriously injured. Many of the dead were shot by automatic rifles, while others were stabbed. They included 10 women and three infants. The attackers also burned 45 houses and 34 vehicles before fleeing by foot through a nearby farm.

Many of the injured were taken to the Saint-Nicolas hospital in Saint-Marc, where the survivors also fled.

Nearly 6,300 people were displaced.

== Reactions ==
Prime Minister Garry Conille responded: "This heinous crime, perpetrated against defenseless women, men, and children, is not only an attack on these victims, but on the entire Haitian nation." The government ordered an elite police unit and medical supplies to Pont-Sondé. Conille later visited the injured in Saint-Marc's hospital. The Transitional Presidential Council held a minute of silence for the victims on 7 October. The police commissioner for the Artibonite Department was dismissed on 4 October. A government prosecutor called the attack a massacre.

Luckson Elan blamed the government and Pont-Sondé's inhabitants for the attack, accusing them of passivity during attacks on Gran Grif members. Survivors have questioned why authorities did not do anything to stop the attack since the gang had warned in a video posted on social media that it planned to target Pont-Sondé.

United Nations Human Rights Office spokesman Thameen Al-Kheetan said his agency was horrified by the attack. The European Union also condemned the attack.
