= Pont-Sondé =

Pont-Sondé Ponsonde
- Town
- Location in Haiti
- Coordinates: 19.1493°N 72.6147°W
- Country: Haiti
- Department: Artibonite
- Arrondissement: Saint-Marc
- Commune: Saint-Marc

Population (2010)
  - Total: 10,000

Pont-Sondé (French pronunciation: [pɔ̃ sɔ̃de], Haitian Creole: Ponsonde seldom Pon sonde) is a town in the communal section of Bocozelle in the Saint-Marc commune, in the Artibonite department of Haiti.

== Location ==
Located within the Saint-Marc Arrondissement, Pont-Sondé is located at an important crossroads on the road linking the capital Port-au-Prince to the second largest city of Cap-Haïtien on the northern coast.

== History ==
When the Haitian national highway was constructed in 1880, a bridge spanning 90 metres (300 ft) across the Artibonite River was built. The settlement of Pont-Sondé then developed around this bridge.

Pont-Sonde had about ten thousand inhabitants before the 2010 Haiti earthquake. Since then, the village has hosted a large influx of refugees.

In September 2024, during the Gang war in Haiti, personnel from the Anti-Gang Tactical Unit and the Departmental Operations and Intervention Brigade were deployed to Pont-Sondé. Despite this, the town was attacked by the Grand Grif gang on 3 October 2024, leaving at least 115 people dead.

== Economy ==
The lowlands along the Artibonite river around Pont-Sondé are the leading producer of rice in Haiti. There is an important market which is held along the road and on the bridge over the Artibonite.
