= 2024 Haitian jailbreak =

Storming of prisons in Haiti by armed gangs

Battle of Port-au-Prince (2024)
- Part of the Haitian conflict (2020–present) and the Haitian crisis (2018–present)
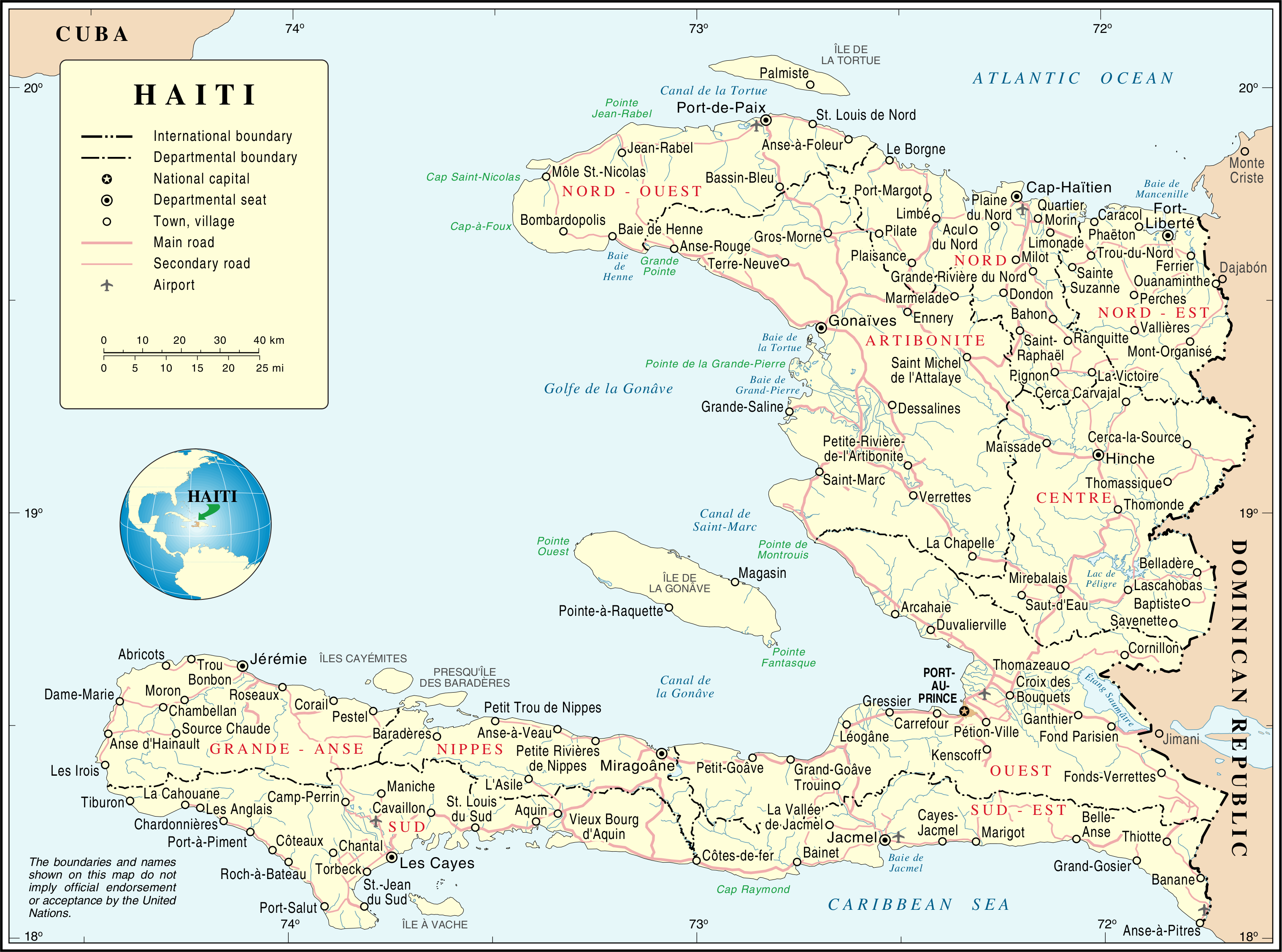
- Map of Haiti
| Date | 28 February – 3 March 2024 |
| Location | Mainly Port-au-Prince, Haiti |
| Status | Ongoing: Ariel Henry resigns from the post of acting Prime Minister of Haiti |

Belligerents
| Revolutionary Forces of the G9 Family and Allies | Haitian security forces; Haitian National Police; Haitian Armed Forces; Armed civilians |

Commanders and leaders
| Jimmy Chérizier; Guy Philippe | (Haiti) Ariel Henry (Haiti) Michel Patrick Boisvert |

Casualties and losses
- 38 dead, 15,000 homeless, 362,000 displaced

Amid the unrest in Haiti since 2018, armed gangs stormed Haiti's two largest prisons in March 2024, resulting in more than 4,700 inmates escaping. The gangs demanded that acting Prime Minister Ariel Henry resign, attacking and closing Toussaint Louverture International Airport and preventing Henry from entering the country. The Haitian government declared a 72-hour state of emergency and a nighttime curfew in Ouest Department in an attempt to curb the violence and chaos. On 12 March 2024, Henry indicated his intention to resign as acting prime minister in response to the deteriorating security situation.

== Background ==
Haiti has been undergoing a crisis since 2018, including political assassinations and a conflict since 2023.

On 1 March 2024, acting prime minister Ariel Henry signed an agreement in Nairobi, Kenya, attempting to allow the deployment of 1,000 Kenyan police officers to Haiti.

== Events ==
Jimmy Chérizier, the leader of the "G9 Family and Allies" armed group in Port-au-Prince, released a video announcing his intention to prevent Ariel Henry from returning to Haiti with the operation. On 1 March, when asked if it was safe for him to return to Haiti, Henry shrugged. Chérizier apparently had the backing of some other gangs as part of a coalition named "Viv Ansanm" (Haitian Creole for "living together"), which launched attacks together with Chérizier's FRG9 group. This newly-formed coalition was announced by Chérizer on 29 February 2024, right when the unrest started.

On 2 and 3 March, armed militants stormed the two largest prisons in Haiti, one in Croix des Bouquets, the other in Port-au-Prince. More than 4,700 inmates escaped. Police were reported to be undermanned and outgunned by the gangs, with only 9,000 operating in Haiti at the time of the fighting. The 400 Mawozo gang operates in the Croix-des-Bouquets area and has influence at its prison, according to Insight Crime. Chérizier, who took responsibility for the surge in violence, said his goal was to capture Haitian government officials, including the police chief. Over 12 people have been killed in the conflict. The UN estimated that 15,000 people fled the violence in Port-au-Prince.

The Haitian government, under finance minister Michel Patrick Boisvert, declared a 72-hour state of emergency and a nighttime curfew in an attempt to curb the violence and chaos. Chérizier claimed responsibility for the increase in attacks, and demanded Henry's resignation, adding that the goal of the increase in attacks was to capture important government officials, including the police chief. Many escaped gang leaders joined the attacks, fueling speculation that an alliance between rival gangs involved in the ongoing Haitian conflict was forming to overthrow the Haitian elite.

On 4 March, at around 1 p.m. local time, armed gangs attacked the heavily fortified Toussaint Louverture International Airport, exchanging gunfire with police and the Haitian Armed Forces, in an attempt to take control of the facility after rumors that Henry would return to Haiti. Johnson André, the leader of the 5 Seconds gang, appeared to be linked to the attacks. The attacks resulted in the closure of the airport and prevented Henry from entering the country. Other riot leaders, including Guy Philippe, indicated that they would try to take over the presidency of Haiti. The Stade Sylvio Cator and national bank were attacked. Other public institutions, including schools and banks, were closed.

There was another reported jailbreak on 5 March, leading to the death of three inmates. Haitian police were able to stop attempts at escape. On 6 March, a police station in Bas-Peu-de-Chose was attacked and burned down by gangs.

On 7 March, the state of emergency in the Ouest Department, including a nightly curfew and bans on protests, was extended from three days to a month (3 April).

On 8 March, gangs attacked two police stations near the National Palace, as well as the palace itself, and burned down the interior ministry. The security perimeter around Toussaint Louverture International Airport was breached by gangs, while gunfire was heard throughout Port-au-Prince.

On 9 March, gangs attacked and occupied the headquarters of the Institute of Social Welfare in Port-au Prince, while the government of the Dominican Republic announced plans to evacuate its officials and citizens from Port-au-Prince.

On 21 March, one of the gang leaders, known only as Makandal, was killed by the bwa kale in Petion-Ville. A day later, Ernst Julme, the leader of Delmas 95 who had escaped from prison earlier in the month, was killed by police in the same area. Julme's death was described as a significant setback for Cherizier in his attempts to take over Port-au-Prince.

== Reactions ==
=== International ===
- Colombia: The Colombian foreign ministry asked Haiti to provide "special protection" to the 18 ex-Colombian soldiers convicted of the assassination of Jovenel Moïse who remained in their cells during the jailbreak.
- United States: President Joe Biden expressed concern about the deteriorating security situation in Haiti and emphasized the need for a coordinated international response to stabilize Haiti. The State Department highlighted continued efforts to help the Haitian National Police and other local institutions improve their capacity in ensuring public safety and combating gang violence.
- Jamaica: Prime Minister Andrew Holness called for a coordinated international response to address the deteriorating situation. The Jamaican Ministry of Foreign Affairs and Foreign Trade has voiced significant worry about the recent jailbreak in Haiti, which resulted in the escape of many detainees.
- Canada: Foreign Affairs Minister Melanie Joly announced that Canada had airlifted 18 Canadians out of Haiti. The operation involved the deployment of Joint Task Force Two (JTF2), to assist with security and contingency planning at the Canadian embassy in Port-au-Prince.
- France: Due to the disruption in commercial air services to Port-au-Prince, the Ministry for Europe and Foreign Affairs, in collaboration with the Ministry for the Armed Forces, is arranging special planes to assist the most vulnerable nationals to escape the country.

== See also ==
- 2021 Croix-des-Bouquets jailbreak

== Sources ==
- Walker, Summer (October 2022). Gangs of Haiti: Expansion, power and an escalating crisis (PDF). Geneva: Global Initiative Against Transnational Organized Crime.
- Regional Overview Latin America & the Caribbean April 2023 (PDF). Geneva: ACLED. May 2023.
