= Bel Air, Haiti =

Bel Air Bèlè
- Neighborhood
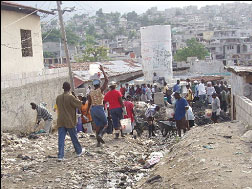
- Ti Chery, Bel Air

- Location in Haiti
- Coordinates: 18°33′N 72°20′W
- Country: Haiti
- Department: Ouest
- Arrondissement: Port-au-Prince

Population
  - Total: 13,000

Bel Air (French pronunciation: [bɛl ɛʁ]; Haitian Creole: Bèlè; lit. 'Pretty Air') is a neighborhood of Port-au-Prince, Haiti. It is a slum area of the city and suffers from poverty. Crime is widespread, and kidnappings and killings have created panic among the local population. The neighborhood is also noted for housing a community of artists and craftsmen who produce inspired by Haitian Vodou, such as flags.

== History ==
In the late 19th century, Bel Air was the preferred place of settlement for British West Indian migrants to Haiti, the largest group of which were Jamaicans.

Bel Air has served as a launching site for political demonstrations demanding the return of President Jean-Bertrand Aristide. In recent years, it has been marred by political violence and massacres by police.

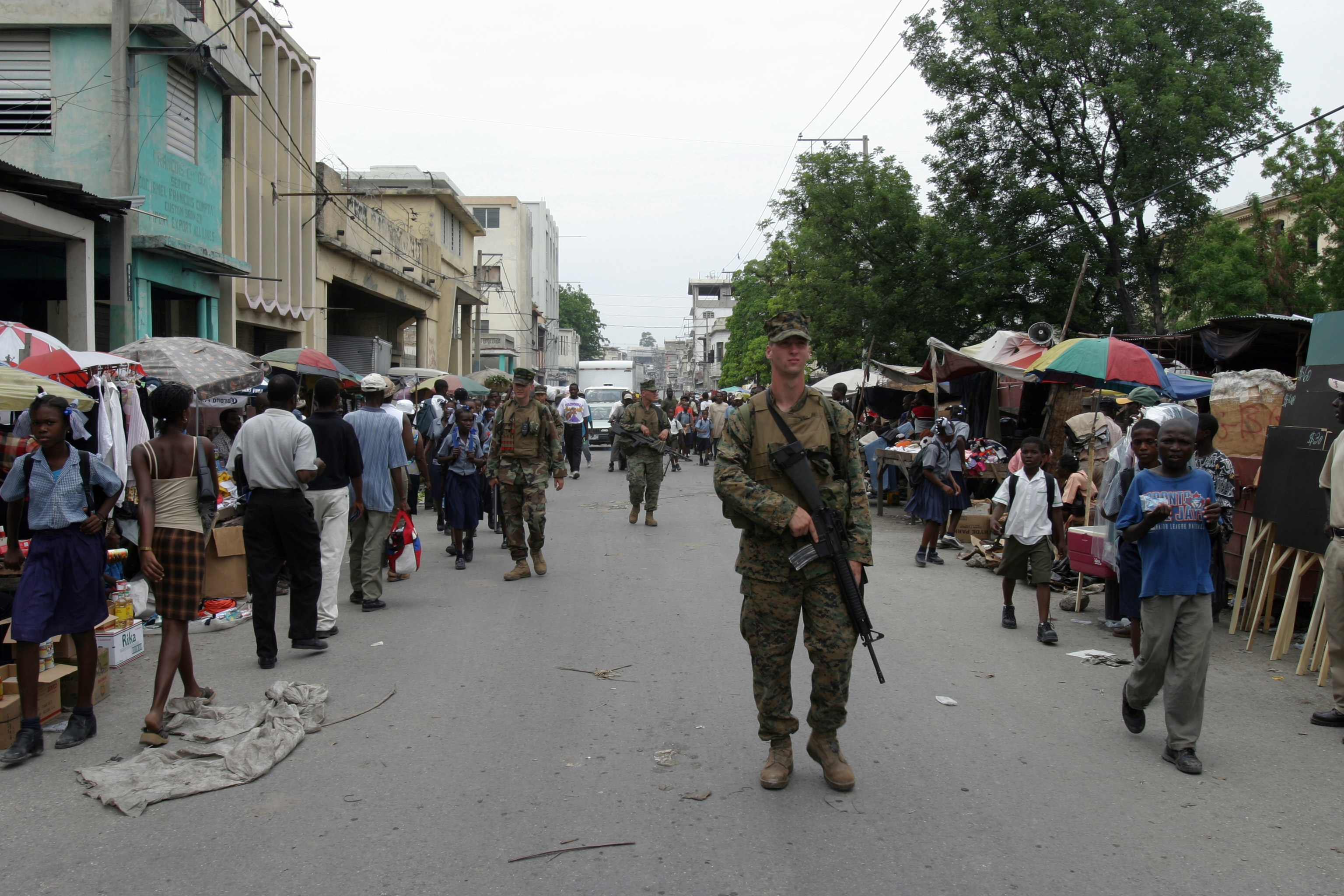
U.S. marines in Bel Air in April 2004.

On January 5, 2005, an uprising broke out and was suppressed by hundreds of Brazilian soldiers and special units of the Haitian National Police. Five persons were reported to have been killed. The trouble in the Bel Air area of the city was seen by the authorities as a major threat to the safety of the 2005 elections in Haiti.

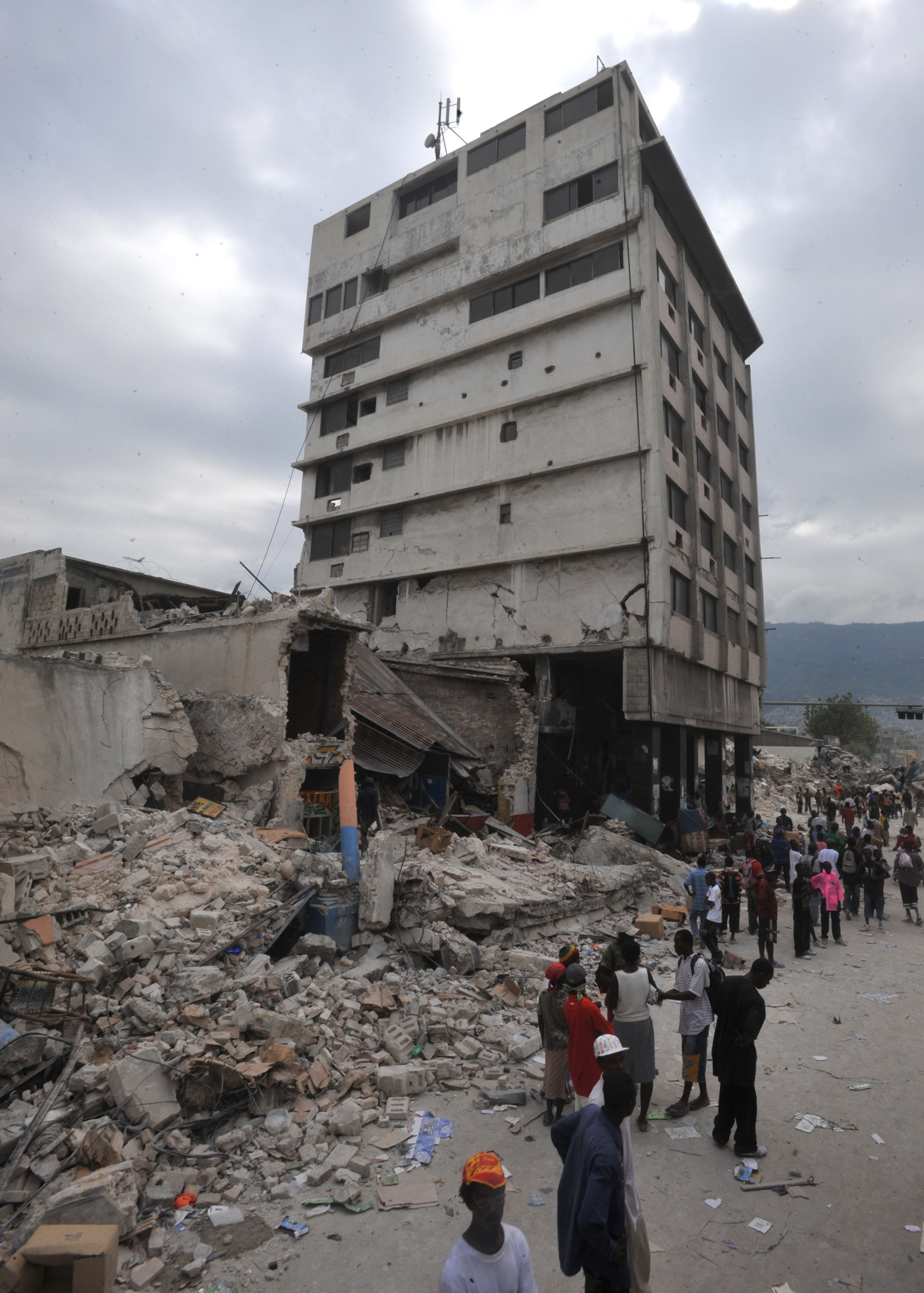
The 2010 earthquake destroyed numerous buildings in Bel Air.

The neighborhood was the most devastated area of Port-au-Prince after the 2010 Haiti earthquake.

== Crime ==
At the end of 2011, the murder rate in Bel Air reached 50 murders per 100,000 residents, up from 19 murders per 100,000 residents in 2010.
