= Mud cake =

Mud cake is a dessert popular in Australia. It can also refer to:

- Mississippi mud pie, a type of dessert
- Kladdkaka, a chocolate mud cake eaten in Sweden, Norway, and Finland
- Geophagy, the practice of eating soil-like substances

== See also ==
- Mudpie (disambiguation)
- Dirt cake, an American cake that resembles soil
