= Mud =

Mixture of water and any combination of soil, silt, sand, and clay

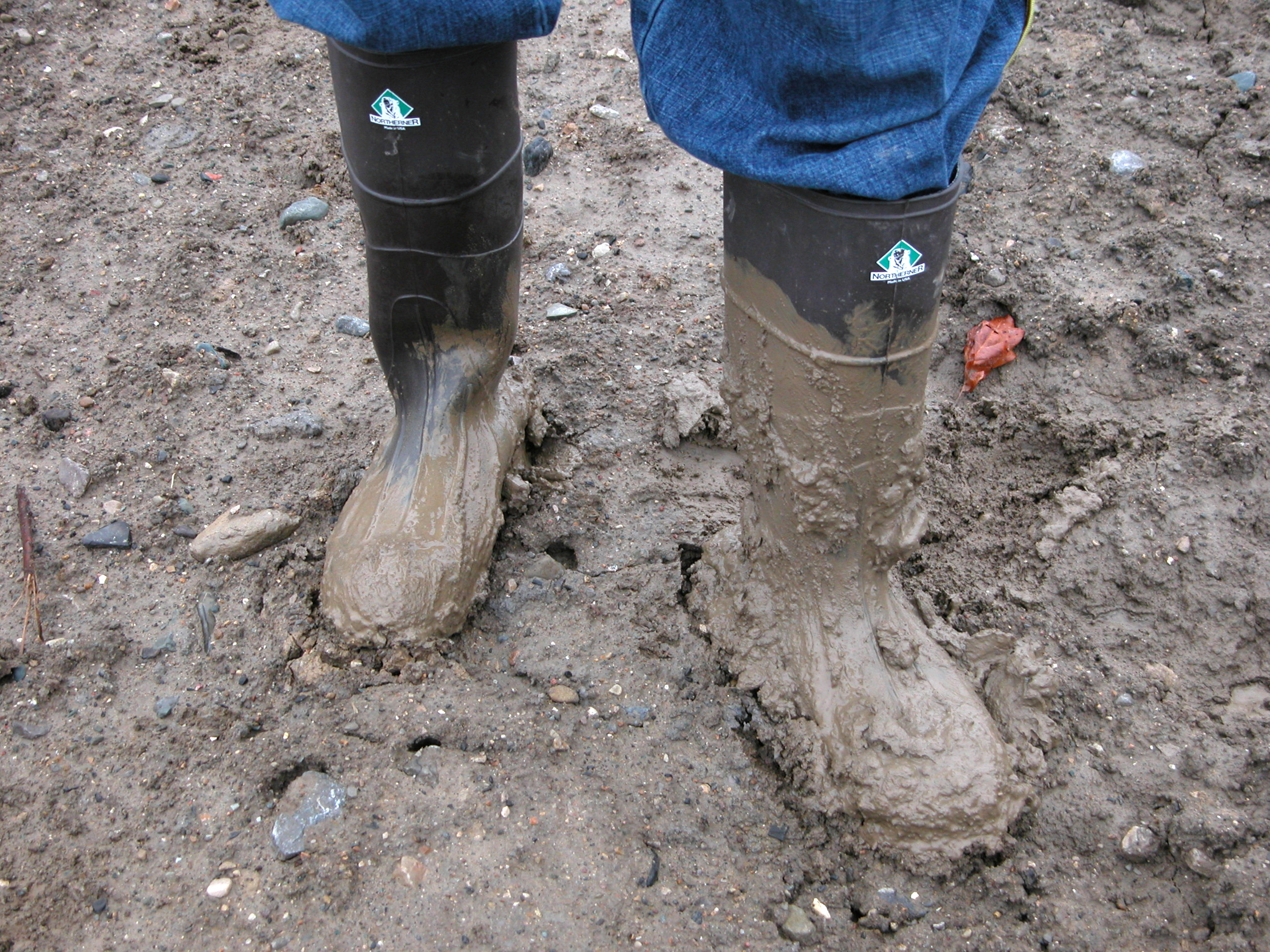
A pair of muddy Wellington boots

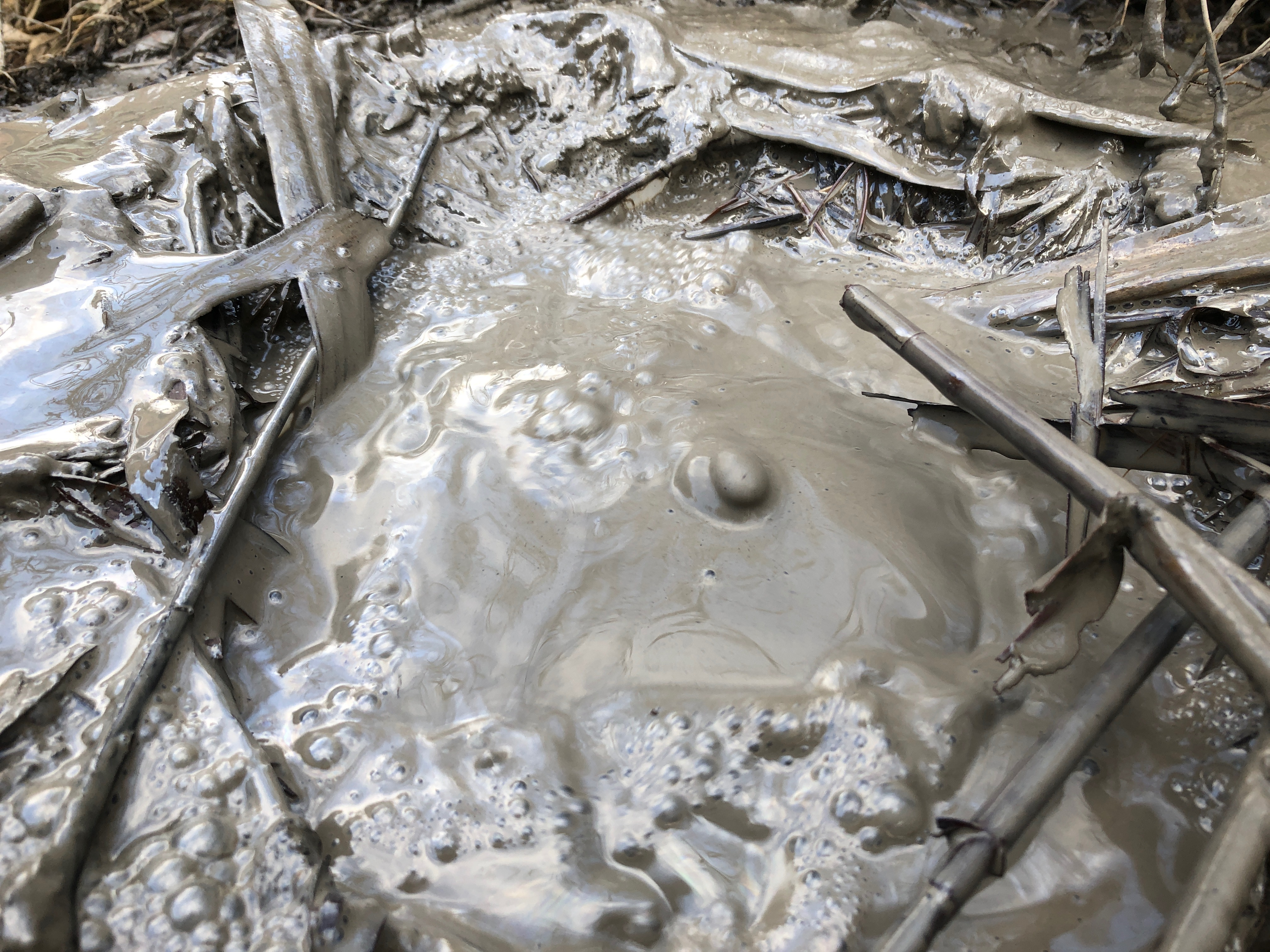
Gamo mud volcano in Tokamachi, Japan

Mud (from Middle Low German mudde, mod(de) 'thick mud', or Middle Dutch) is loam, silt, or clay mixed with water. Mud is usually formed after rainfall or near water sources. Ancient mud deposits hardened over geological time to form sedimentary rock such as shale or mudstone (generally called lutites). When geological deposits of mud are formed in estuaries, the resultant layers are termed bay muds. Mud has also been used for centuries as a construction resource, mostly for houses, and also as a binder. An Old English word for it was fen, now in most dialects referring to a type of wetland.

== Building and construction ==
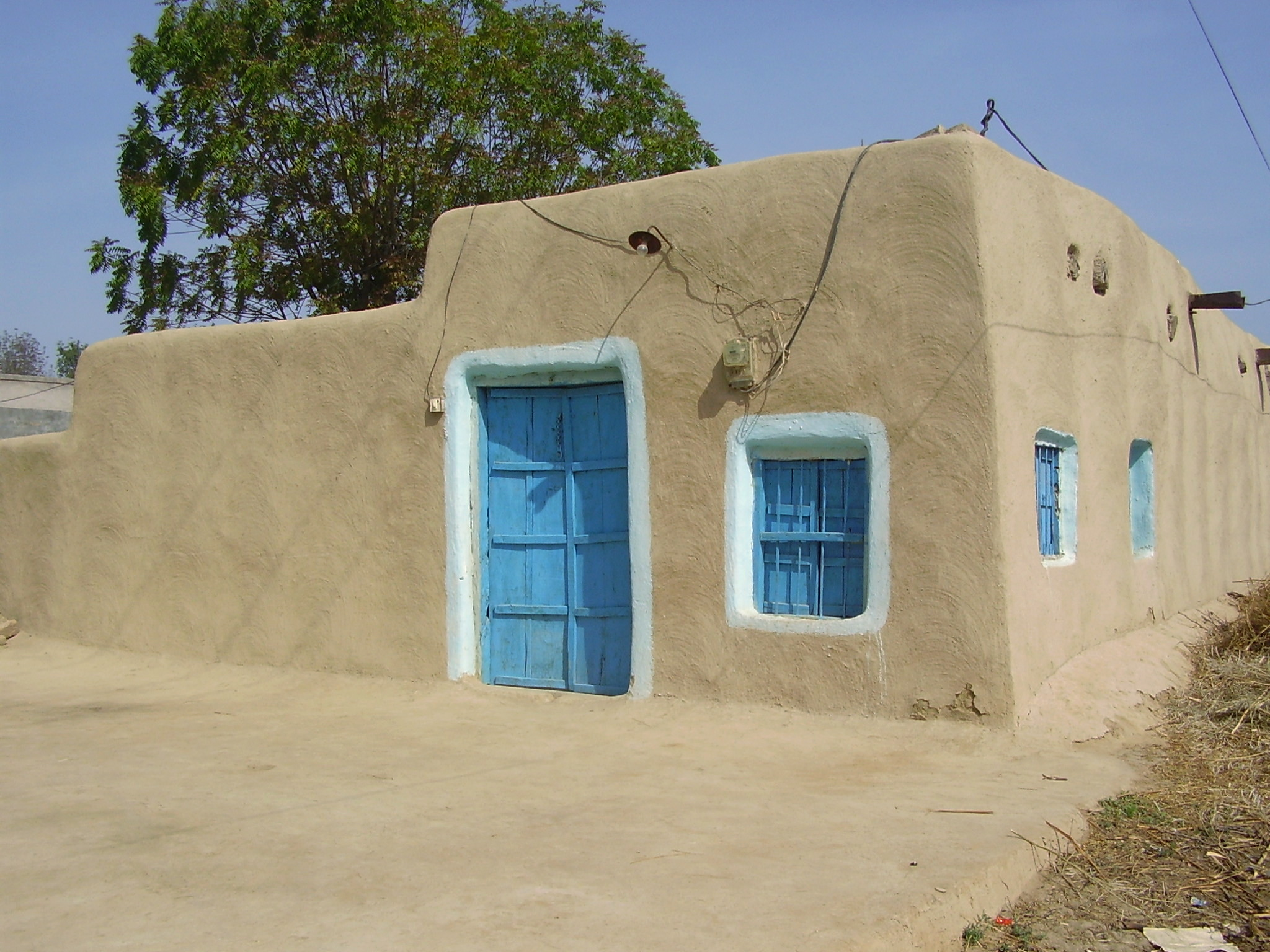
Mud-plastered home in Pakistan

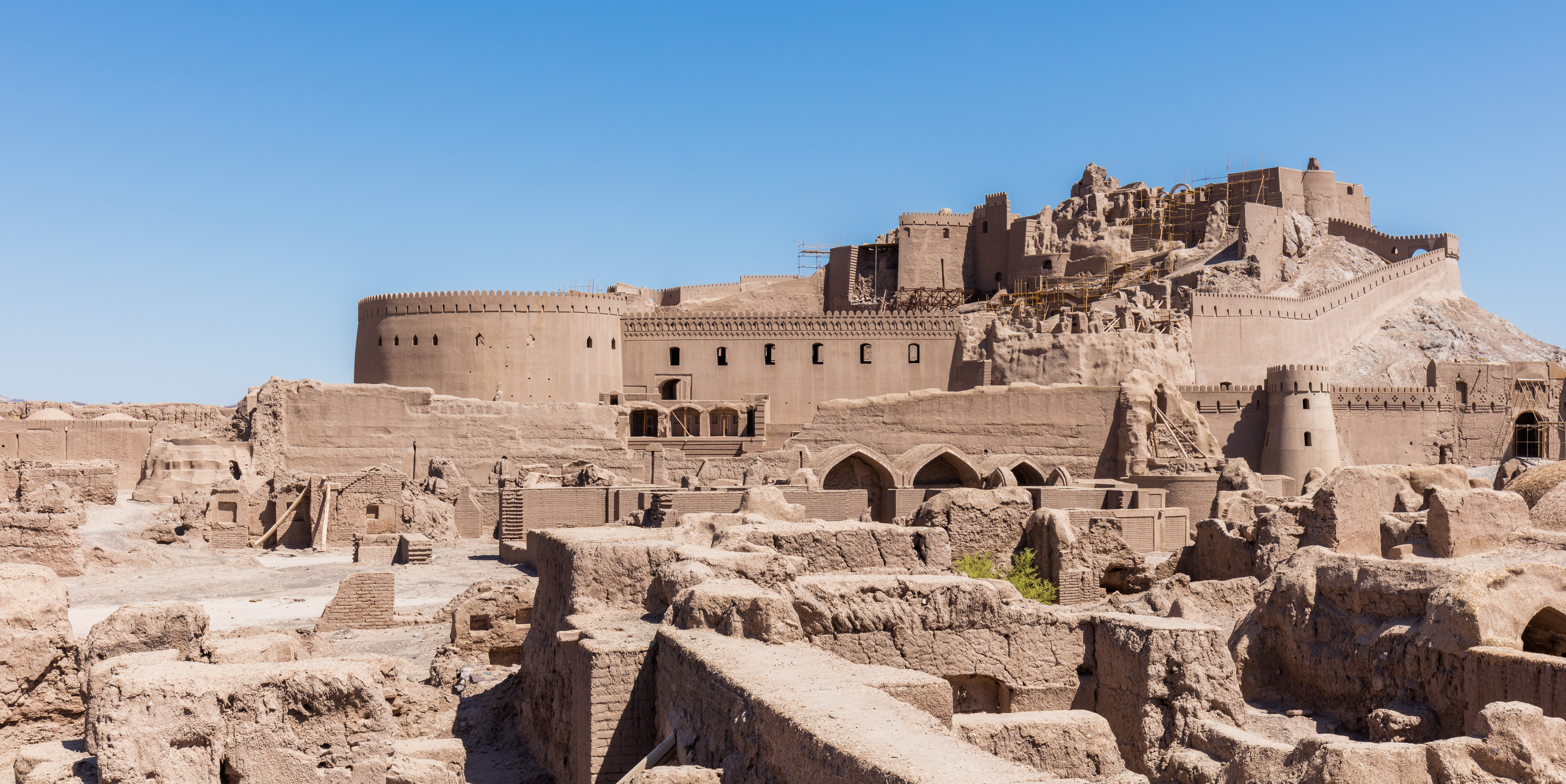
The Arg-e Bam citadel in Iran, the largest adobe building in the world

=== Adhesive ===
In the construction industry, mud is a semi-fluid material that can be used to coat, seal, or adhere materials. The term "mud" can be used for various semi-fluid materials used in construction including slurry, mortar, plaster, stucco, and concrete.

=== Material ===
Mud, cob, adobe, clay, and many other names are historically used synonymously to mean a mixture of subsoil and water possibly with the addition of stones, gravel, straw, lime, and/or bitumen. This material was used in a variety of ways to build walls, floors, and even roofs. For thousands of years, it was common in most parts of the world to build walls using mudbricks or wattle and daub, rammed earth, or cob techniques and to cover the surfaces with earthen plaster.

==== Mudbrick ====
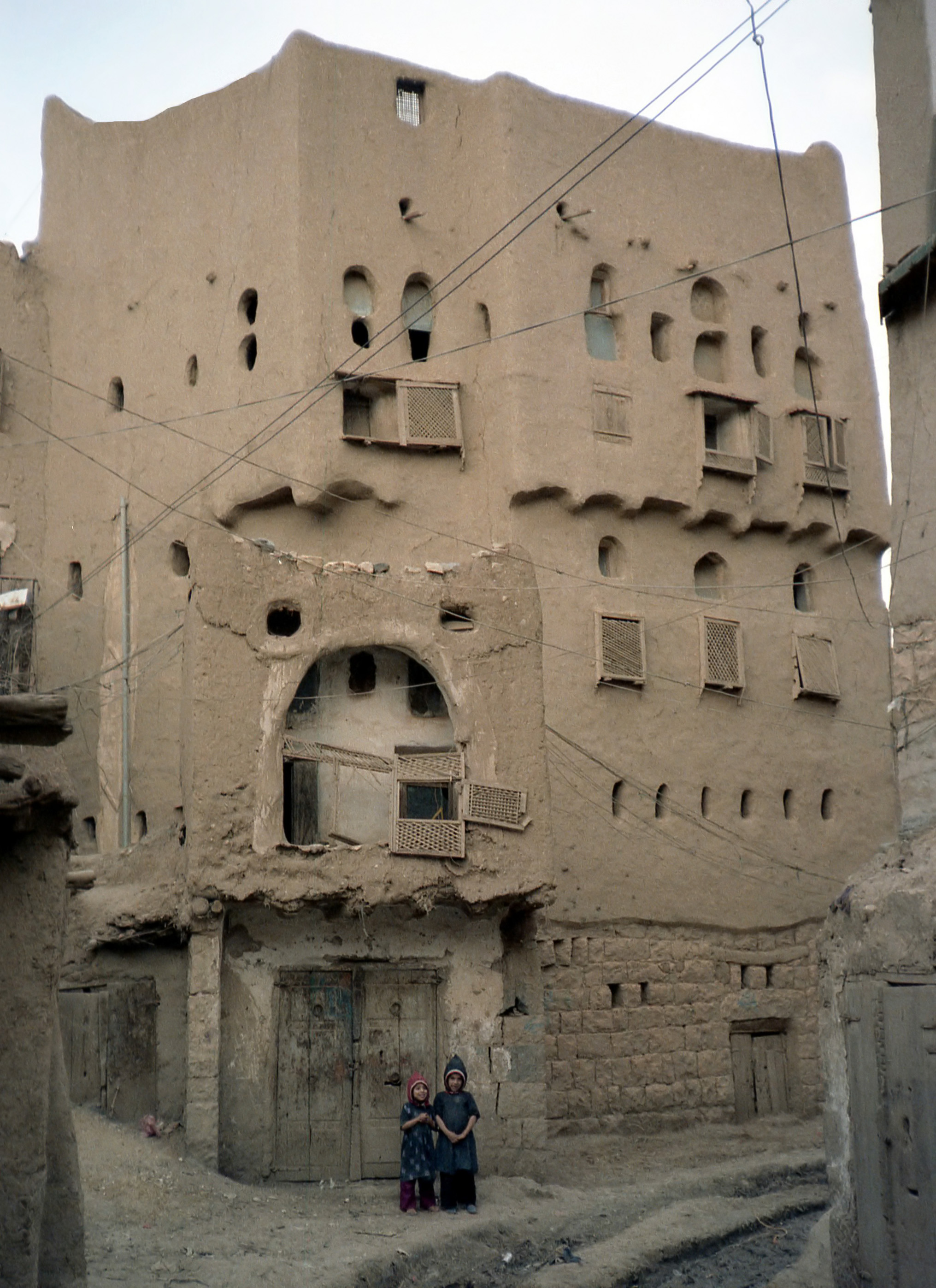
Mud house in 'Amran, Yemen

Mud can be made into mud bricks, also called adobe, by mixing mud with water, placing the mixture into moulds and then allowing it to dry in open air. Straw is sometimes used as a binder within the bricks, as it makes them a composite. When the brick would otherwise break, the straw will redistribute the force throughout the brick, decreasing the chance of breakage. Such buildings must be protected from groundwater, usually by building upon a masonry, fired brick, rock or rubble foundation, and also from wind-driven rain in damp climates, usually by deep roof overhangs. In extremely dry climates a well-drained flat roof may be protected with a well-prepared (puddled) and properly maintained dried mud coating, viable as the mud will expand when moistened and so become more water-resistant. Adobe mudbricks were commonly used by the Pueblo Indians to build their homes and other necessary structures. In some countries there are entire cities made of mud brick houses. Cow dung and biomass are added to regulate indoor climate.

==== Fired brick ====
Mud that is mostly clay, or a mixture of clay and sand may be used for ceramics, of which one form is the common fired brick. Fired brick are more durable but consume much more energy to produce.

==== Stabilized mud ====
Stabilized mud (earth, soil) is mud which has had a binder such as cement or bitumen added. Examples are mudcrete, landcrete, and soil cement.

== Pottery ==
Pottery is made by forming a clay body into objects of a required shape and heating them to high temperatures in a kiln which removes all the water from the clay, which induces reactions that lead to permanent changes including increasing their strength and hardening and setting their shape. A clay body can be decorated before or after firing. Prior to some shaping processes, clay must be prepared. Kneading helps to ensure an even moisture content throughout the body. Air trapped within the clay body needs to be removed. This is called de-airing and can be accomplished by a machine called a vacuum pug or manually by wedging. Wedging can also help produce an even moisture content. Once a clay body has been kneaded and de-aired or wedged, it is shaped by a variety of techniques. After shaping, it is dried and then fired.

In ceramics, the making of liquid mud (called slip) is a stage in the process of refinement of the materials, since larger particles will settle from the liquid.

== Habitat ==
Mud provides habitat for diverse species on land and in the sea. Terrestrial mud environments, often found in riparian zones and wetlands, are essential for burrowing organisms, providing crucial shelter and moisture for many insects, worms, and amphibians during dry periods. In marine and estuarine environments, the soft, fine-grained sediment of mudflats and benthic zones creates a unique, nutrient-rich habitat that supports dense communities of invertebrates, including various species of polychaete worms, bivalves (like clams), and crustaceans. These infaunal species burrow deeply into the mud, which buffers them from extreme changes in temperature and salinity, and in turn, they serve as a critical food source for migratory shorebirds and bottom-feeding fish.

=== Land ===
Mud can provide a home for numerous types of animals, including varieties of worms, frogs, snails, clams, and crayfish. Other animals, such as hippopotamuses, pigs, rhinoceroses, water buffalo and elephants, bathe in mud in order to cool off and protect themselves from the sun. Submerged mud can be home to larvae of various insects.

=== Marine life ===
Mud plays an important role in the marine ecosystem. The activities of burrowing animals and fish have a dramatic churning effect on muddy seabeds. This allows the exchange and cycling of oxygen, nutrients, and minerals between water and sediment.

Below the surface, the burrows of some species form intricate lattice-like networks and may penetrate a meter or more downwards. This means that the burrowed mud is a productive habitat, providing food and shelter for many mud-dwellers and other animals that forage in and over the mud.

== Problems ==
Mud can pose problems for motor traffic when moisture is present, because every vehicle function that changes direction or speed relies on friction between the tires and the road surface, so a layer of mud on the surface of the road or tires can cause the vehicle to hydroplane. People and cars can also become stuck in mud, as in quicksand.

Heavy rainfall, snowmelt, or high levels of groundwater may trigger a movement of soil or sediments, possibly causing mudslides, landslides, avalanches, or sinkholes. Mudslides in volcanic terrain (called lahars) occur after eruptions as rain remobilizes loose ash deposits. Mudslides are also common in the western United States during El Niño years due to prolonged rainfall.

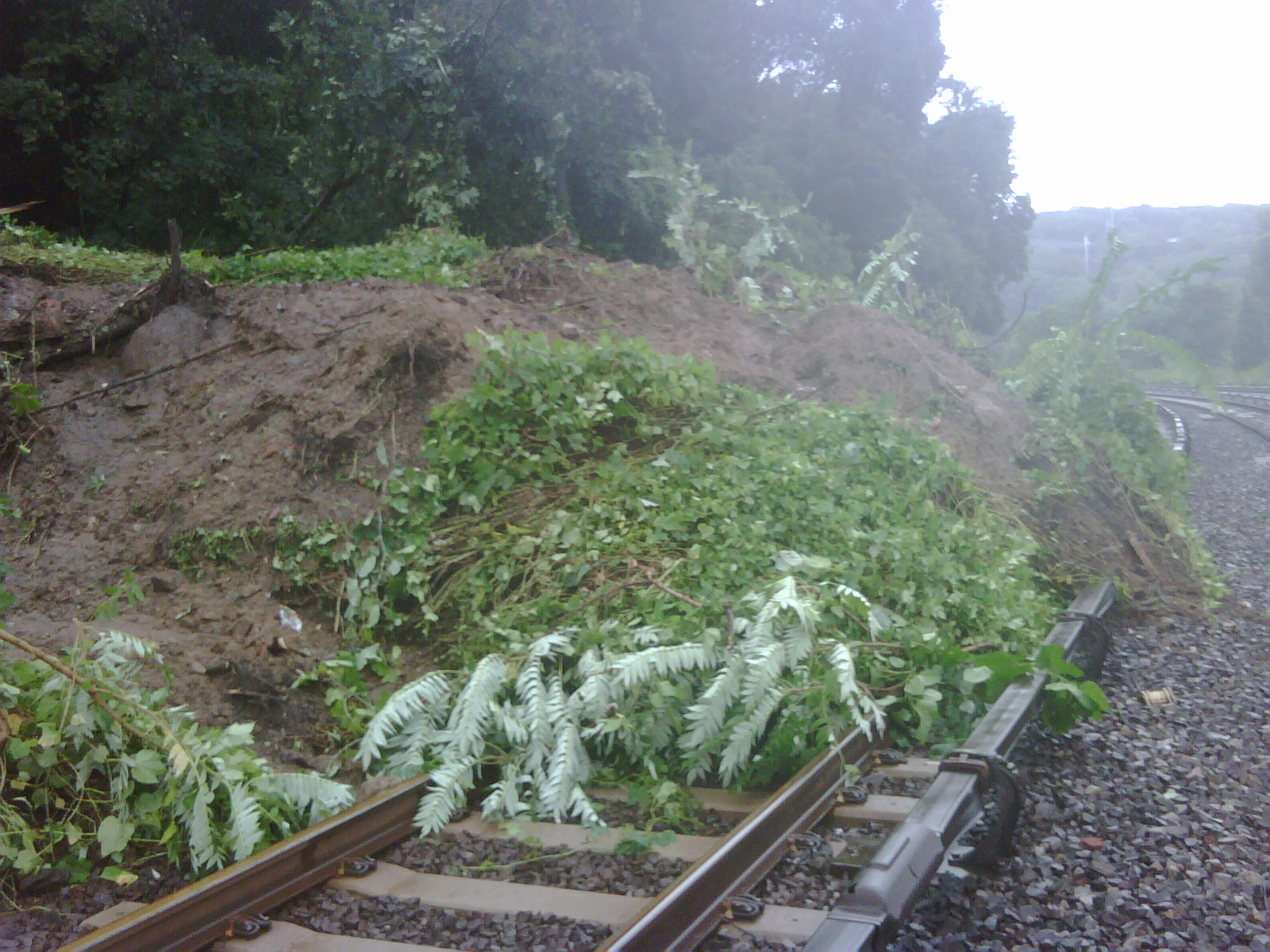
A landslide on a railroad

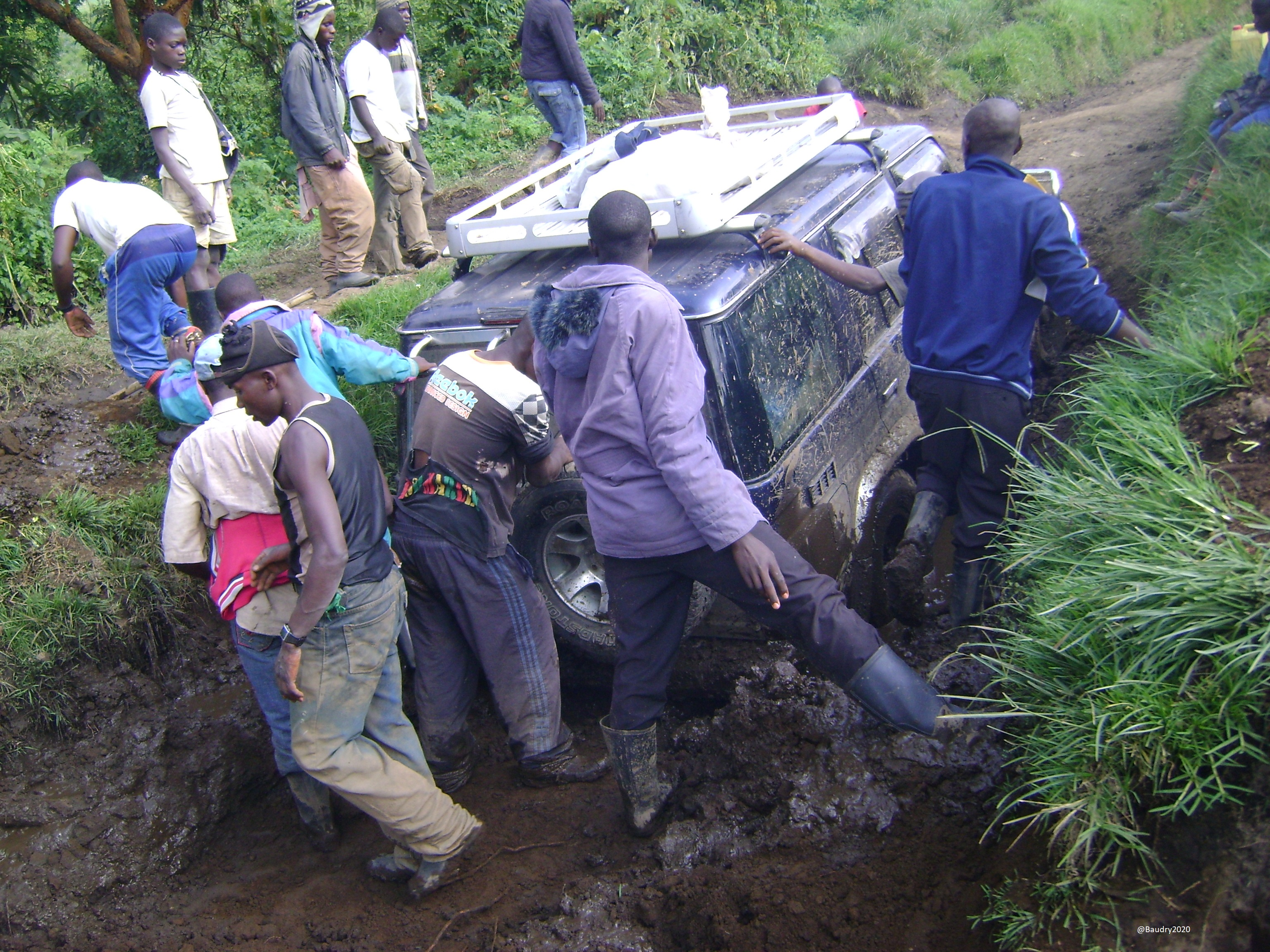
Vehicle in mud after heavy rainfall (Democratic Republic of the Congo)

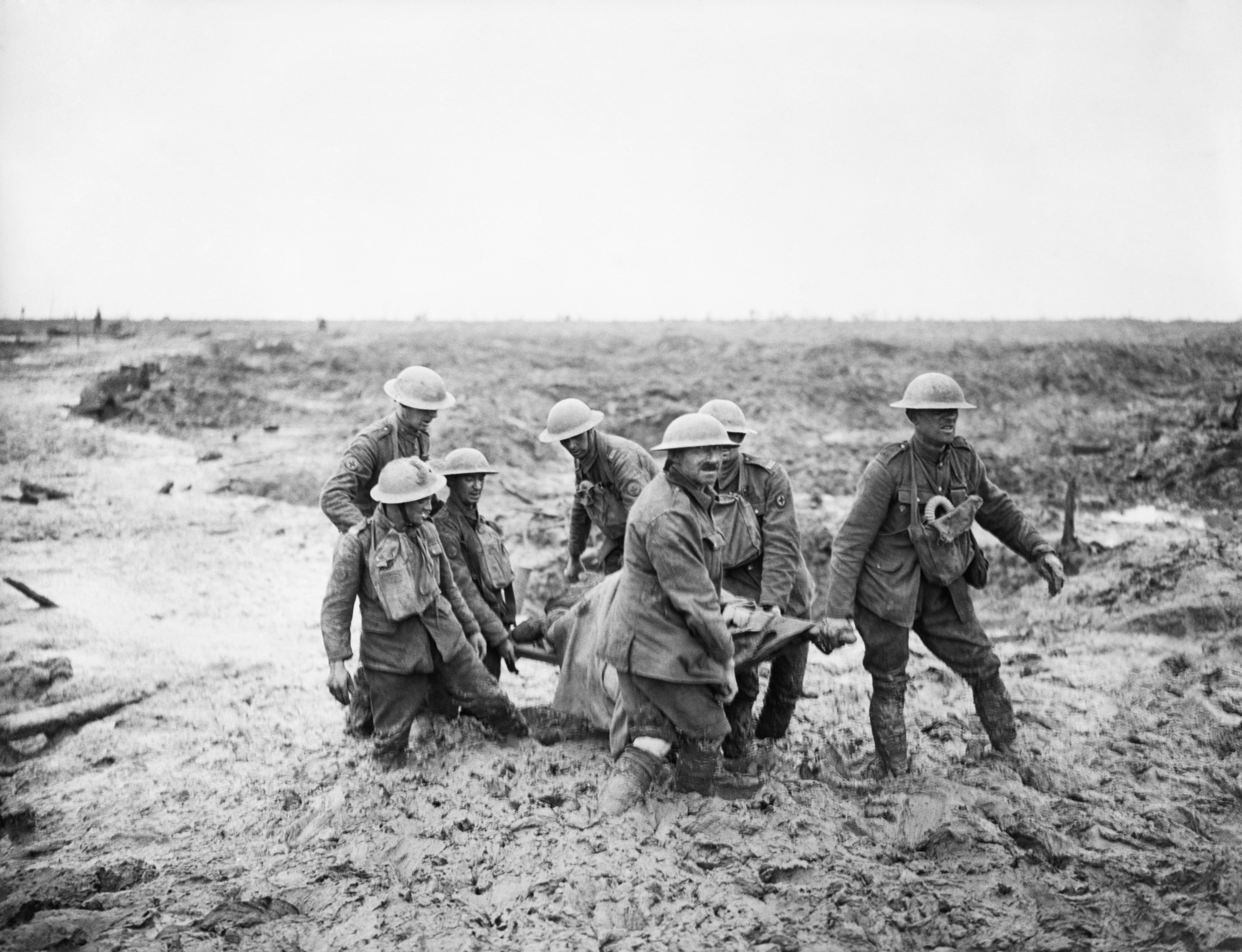
Mud was a decisive factor in the infamous Battle of Passchendaele in 1917.

== As food ==
Geophagia is the practice of eating earth or soil-like substances, also known as geophagy, and is practiced by some non-human primates and by humans in some cultures. In other human cultures, it is considered an eating disorder and classed as pica.

=== Foods named "mud" ===
Mississippi mud pie is a chocolate based dessert pie. Mud cookies (baked from literal dirt mixed with oil, water, etc.) are also eaten in the poorest parts of Haiti. Children's recipes for "mud" also exist, which is generally a chocolate or cornstarch-based sludge used more for visual appeal than actual taste. However, it does not contain real mud. "Mud" is also a colloquial slang word for coffee, especially when thick, strong, and/or dark.

== Recreation ==
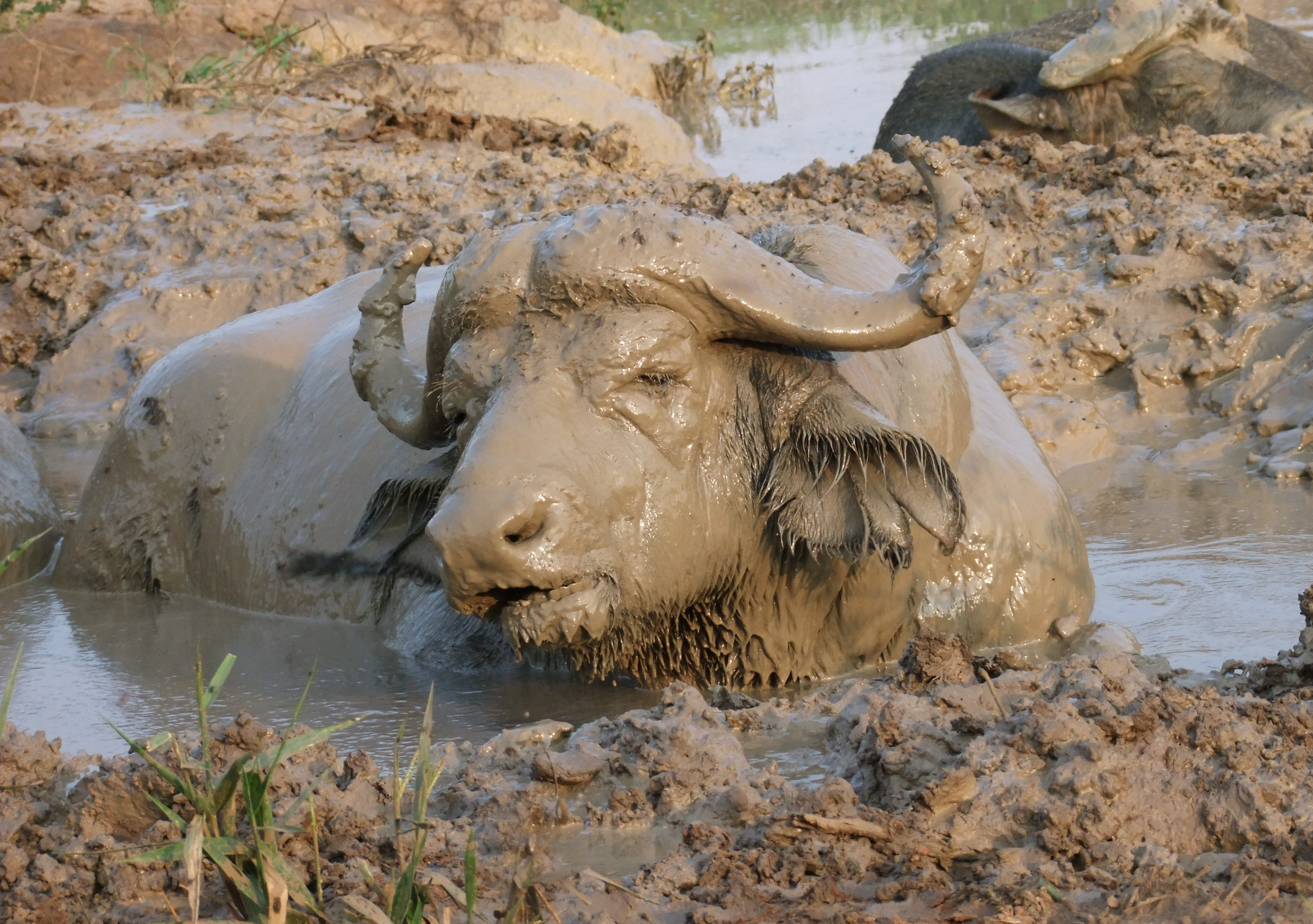
A buffalo wallowing

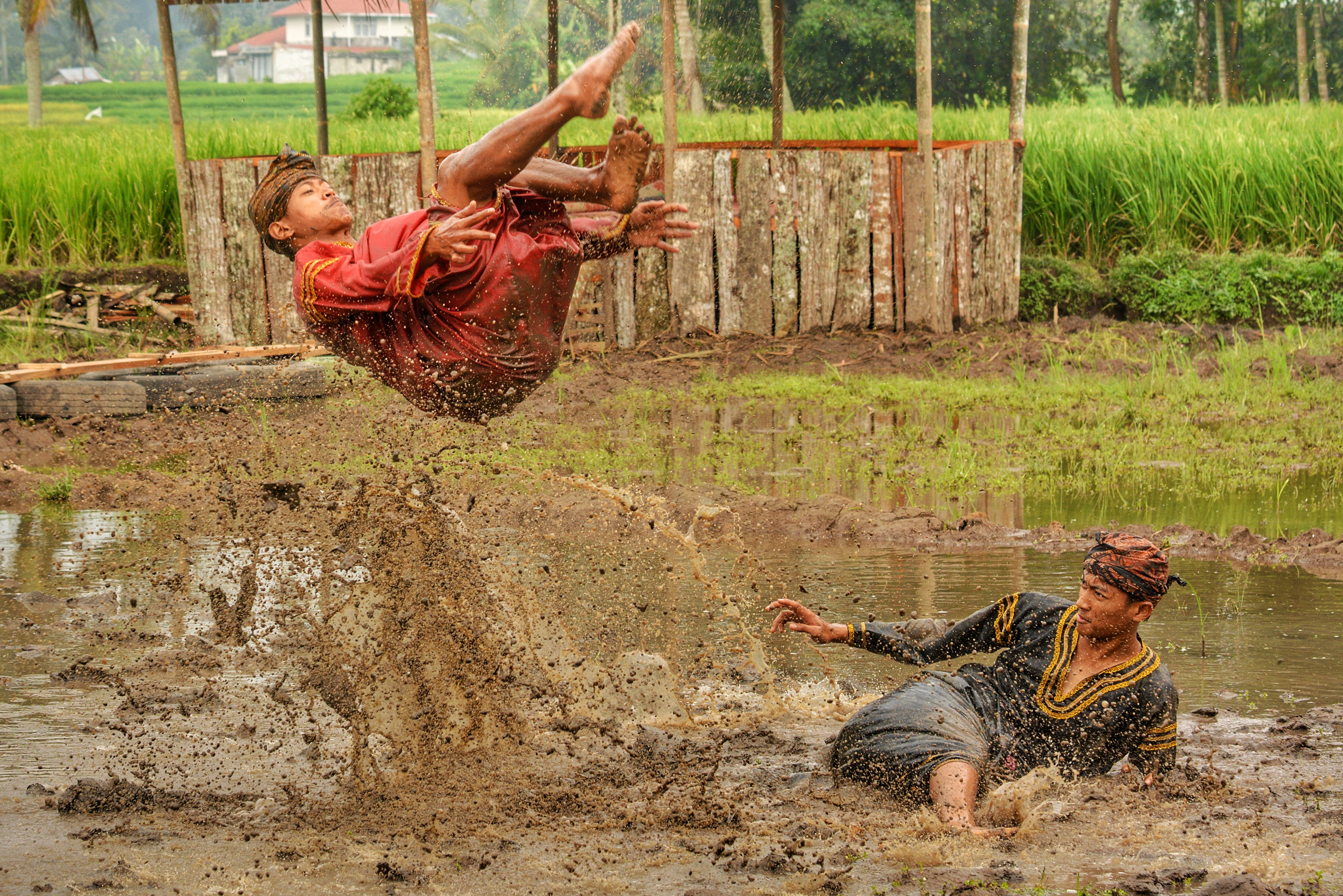
People doing martial arts in the mud

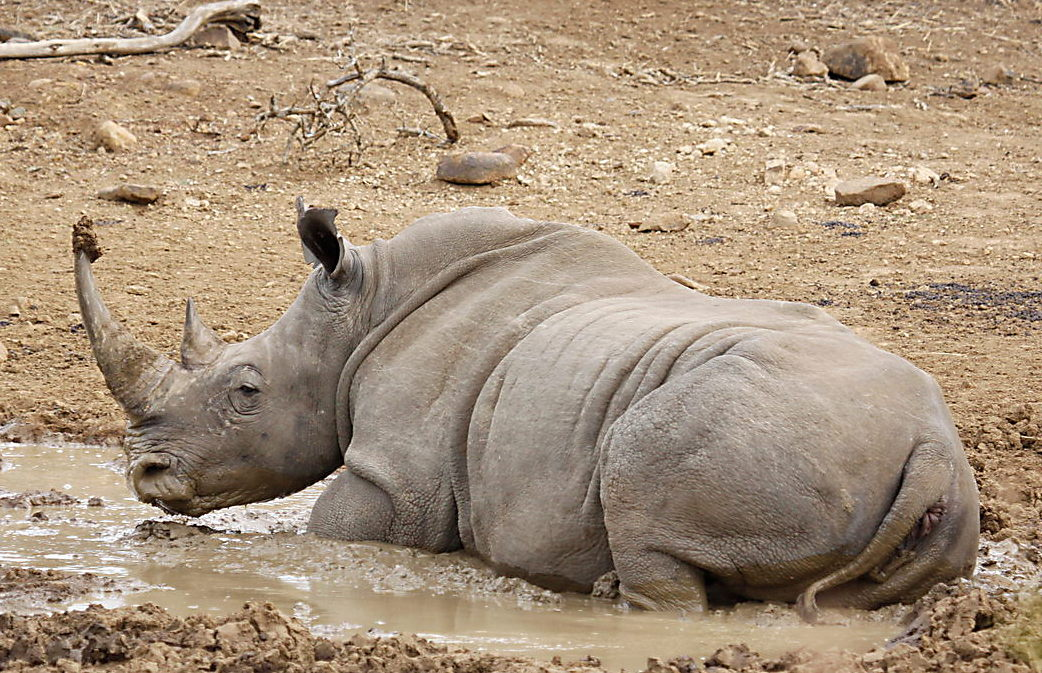
A rhinoceros wallowing

=== Mud bath ===
A mud bath is a bath of mud, commonly from areas where hot spring water can combine with volcanic ash. Mud baths have existed for thousands of years, and can be found now in high-end spas.

=== Mud wallow ===
Mud wallows are a common source of entertainment for children. Mud wallows can be any shape, size, depth and some can have water as well as mud. Usually, wallows are shallow dips in the ground that have been flooded and were full of dirt and those two have mixed to make a squishy mud wallow.

=== Mud sports ===
Mud sports are sports that take place in, or heavily incorporate, mud. Examples include:

- Mud bogging, an off-road motorsport popular in Canada and the United States in which the goal is to drive a vehicle through a pit of mud or a track of a set length.
- Mud runs, where contestants run and crawl through mud bogs and other obstacles.
- Dirt biking, biking through muddy tracks and courses.
- Mud wrestling, a form of wrestling that takes place in mud.

=== Other uses ===
- Mud can be used in a dunk tank.
- Baseball rubbing mud is used to remove the sheen from new baseballs.
- Children often like to make mud pies, throw mud at each other and play barefoot and cover their bare feet in mud and squish it between their toes.
- Mud can be smeared across the skin as a repellent from mosquitoes.
- Many animals cover themselves in mud (wallowing) to cool off.

== See also ==
- Sludge
- Drilling mud
- Muck (soil)
- Mudcrack
- Mudcrete
- Mudflap
- Mud volcano
- Peloid
- Mudflat
