= Mudpie =

Mudpie or mud pie can refer to:

- Mississippi mud pie, a type of dessert
- Mud pie, a non-edible "pie" made of mud made by children for fun
- MUDPIE, the code name of the game Uru: Ages Beyond Myst

== See also ==
- Dorodango, "mud dumpling", a Japanese art form in which earth and water are molded to create a delicate shiny sphere
- Mud cake (disambiguation)
