= Pyotr Dravert =

Russian geologist, meteoriticist, and poet (1879–1945)

- Пётр Людо́викович Дра́верт
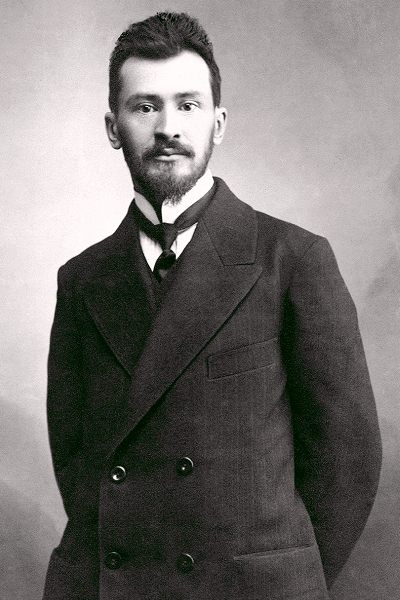
- 1914
- Born: 16 January, 1879; Vyatka, Russian Empire
- Died: 12 December 1945 (aged 66); Omsk, Russian SFSR, Soviet Union
- Education: Imperial University of Kazan
- Known for: Studies of Siberian meteorites, coining the scientific terms "electrophonic bolides", "lithophagy"
- Scientific career
- Fields: Geology, Mineralogy, Meteoritics
- Workplaces: Omsk Agricultural Academy, Omsk Regional Museum of Local Lore

Signature
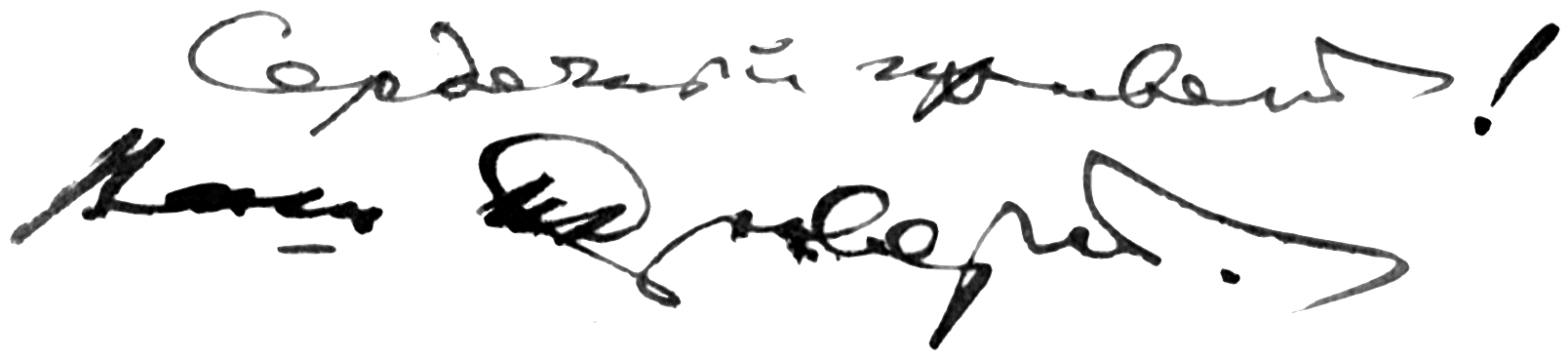

Notes
- Photos

Pyotr Lyudovikovich Dravert (Russian: Пётр Людо́викович Дра́верт; 16 January 1879 – 12 December 1945) was a Russian and Soviet geologist, mineralogist, meteoriticist, professor, poet, and writer. He was a pioneer in the study of meteorites in Siberia.

== Biography ==
Dravert was born into a noble family of Polish and French origin (the name is thought to derive from the French: "drapeau vert" - Green Banner of the Crusaders). He studied at the gymnasiums in Yekaterinburg and then Kazan. In 1899, he entered the Imperial University of Kazan.

=== Exiles in Siberia ===
His involvement in the revolutionary student movement led to two periods of exile in Siberia:

- 1901: Arrested and exiled to the Perm Governorate.
- 1906: Sentenced to ten years of exile in Vilyuysk, Yakutia. In 1911, thanks to the intervention of the Academy of Sciences, he was transferred to Tomsk.

During his exiles, he conducted mineralogical and geographical research in Yakutia, studying salt deposits and mineral springs.

=== Scientific career ===
In 1914, Dravert completed his studies at the University of Kazan, by then already an established scientist. In 1916, he participated in an expedition of the Geological Committee to the Vilyuy River basin.

From 1918, he lived and worked in Omsk. He became a professor at the Siberian Agricultural Academy and chaired its scientific bureau.

In the aftermath of the Russian Civil War, during a severe famine in 1921, Professor Dravert published a practical brochure titled "On the Use of the Rush Root as a Bread Flour Substitute" . He provided clear instructions on how to find, prepare, and safely consume the local rush plant as an emergency food source, even testing it himself to ensure it was harmless.

He was arrested in 1921 and again in 1931 during the case of the "Society for the Study of Siberia," but was released due to lack of evidence.

During World War II, he directed a laboratory for construction materials, working on local mineral substitutes. From 1944 until his death, he worked at the Omsk Regional Museum of Local Lore.

Dravert died on 12 December 1945 in Omsk. His funeral, held at the museum, was a poignant ceremony: his coffin rested on the gown of Empress Alexandra Feodorovna, and a friend delivered a eulogy in Latin. He was initially buried at the Cossack Cemetery, but his remains were transferred to the Staro-Vostochnoye Cemetery in 1961.

== Scientific contributions ==
=== Meteoritics ===
A pioneer in the study of meteorites in Siberia, Dravert participated in the first Soviet meteorite expedition in 1921 alongside Vladimir Vernadsky, Alexander Fersman, and Leonid Kulik. In 1927, he headed the Omsk Commission on Meteorites, and from 1939, he was a member of the Committee on Meteorites of the USSR Academy of Sciences.

He studied meteorite falls and collected several specimens, including the Khmelevka, Kuznetsovo, and Yerofeyevka meteorites.

He was the first to study in detail "electrophonic bolides" (meteors accompanied by anomalous sounds), a term he himself proposed.

=== Geology and mineralogy ===
Dravert discovered and described several mineral deposits. In 1918, he found a rare variety of oldhamite (calcium sulfide), which was later named dravertinite in his honor. A new mineral, CuMg(SO_{4})_{2}, discovered in Kamchatka in 2015, was named dravertite in his honor.

He studied earthquakes in the Bayanaul Mountains (Kazakhstan) and discovered rock art in a cave there, which is now known as Dravert's Grotto.

He introduced the scientific term "lithophagy" He defined the term as ingestion of minerals for nutritional purposes, what is commonly called geophagia now.

== Literary work ==
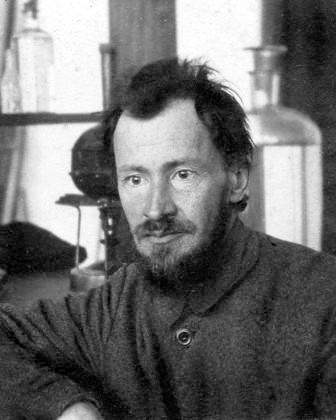
1920th

Dravert's first collection, Shadows and Echoes, was published in Kazan in 1904. His poetry, imbued with Siberian themes and scientific terminology, was appreciated for its originality. He also wrote short stories, including a fantasy tale, The Tale of the Mammoth and the Ice Age Man (1909), published under the pseudonym Hector D.

== Honours and legacy ==
Minerals named after Dravert:

- Dravertinite (a variety of oldhamite, CaS)
- dravertite (CuMg(SO_{4})_{2})

Animal::

- Lymnaea palustris draverti, Mozley, 1934 - water snail

Toponyms:

- Dravert's Grotto (Kazakhstan), an archaeological and geological site
- Dravert Shore (Omsk Oblast), a paleontological site on the Irtysh River
- Dravert Street in Omsk (named in 2007)
- Dravert’s Quarters - modern residents in Omsk.

Notable students:

- Leonid Martynov (1905–1980), poet
- Sergei Zalygin (1913–2000), writer

=== Archives ===
His personal library is preserved at the Omsk State Scientific Library. His documents and collections are held in the archives of the Russian Academy of Sciences and the Omsk State Museum of History and Local Lore.

== Publications ==
Selected scientific works:

- Expedition to the Syuntar salt region (Экспедиция в соленосный район Сюнтар). Yakutsk, 1908. 43 c.
- Materials for the Ethnography and Geography of the Yakutsk Region (Материалы для этнографии и географии Якутской области). Kazan, 1912. 50 pp.
- On lithophagy: [stone eating] (О литофагии: [камнеедении]) // Siberian nature. 1922. No. 1. P. 3-6.
- Useful minerals of the Omsk-Tara region (Полезные ископаемые Омско-Тарского края). Omsk: Omsk Bureau of Local History, 1933. 20 pp.
- Shower of meteoritic stone in the neighbourhood of the village Kuznetzovo, West Siberia, on May 26, 1932 // Mineralogical Magazine. 1934. Vol. 23. N 144. P. 509-512.
- A new iron meteorite from Kazakhstan // Journal of the Royal Astronomical Society of Canada. 1938. Vol. 33. No 2. P. 51.
- Some lost meteorites of the USSR (Asiatic part) // Journal of the Royal Astronomical Society of Canada. 1938. Vol. 33. No 2. P. 53-56.
- Agronomic ores in the Omsk region (Агрономические руды в Омской области). Omsk: Omgiz, 1944. 21 p.
- Lost meteorites of the Asian part of the USSR (Потерянные метеориты азиатской части СССР). Meteoritika. 1948. Vol. 4.

Selected literary works:

- Тени и отзвуки (Shadows and Echoes). Kazan, 1904 (Poetry)
- Под небом якутской страны (Under the Sky of the Yakut Land). Tomsk, 1911 (Poetry)
- Сибирь (Siberia). Novo-Nikolayevsk, 1923 (Poetry)
- Сказание о маманте и ледниковом человеке (The Tale of the Mammoth and the Ice Age Man). 1909. (Fantasy story, as Hector D.)

=== About P. Dravert ===
- Leifer A. E. "I Will Not Betray Siberia!.." Pages of One Life («Сибири не изменю!..». Страницы одной жизни). Novosibirsk, 1979. 134 p. Circulation 5,000 copies.
- Dravertite, a new mineral species from the Tolbachik volcano, Kamchatka, Russia. European Journal of Mineralogy, 2017.
- Siberia as a Symbolistic Topos: Shadows and Echoes (1904) by Pyotr L. Dravert. Vestnik NSU, Series History and Philology, 2022.
- P. L. Dravert’s Prehistoric Science Fiction in the “Siberian Text” of Russian Literature. 2023. https://doi.org/10.15826/qr.2023.1.791
- Pyotr Ludovikovich Dravert and Pyotr Nikolaevich Chirvinsky: Scientific correspondence (1934-1945). editor N. I. Bryanchaninova; compiled by I. P. Vtorov, E. N. Senkova. Introduction by: V. I. Onoprienko and G. B. Buslaeva. 2024. https://doi.org/10.24108/preprints-3113203
- Dravert's Materials in the Collection of the A. E. Fersman Mineralogical Museum of the Russian Academy of Sciences. 2025.
