= Calabash chalk =

Geophagic material

Calabash chalk on a dish

Calabash chalk is a geophagic material popularly consumed in West African countries for pleasure, and by pregnant women as a cure for nausea. Geophagia is the practice of eating the earth, including soil and chalk. This practice is neither new nor outdated and can be associated with religious beliefs, medication or as part of a regular diet. This act can expose the consumer to toxic substances and parasites found in the ingested earth.

== Name ==
Calabash chalk is identified by different names such as calabar stone (English), la craie or argile (French), mabele (Lingala in Congo), nzu (Igbo of Nigeria), ndom (Efik/Ibibio Nigeria) eko (Bini/Edo Nigeria). It is also known as ebumba in Uganda, poto and ulo. In Ghana it is known as shilè.umcako in zulu (South Africa)

== Location ==
Calabash chalk is found predominantly in Nigeria and other West African communities. Although this geophagic material is native to Africa, as a result of migration of West Africans to other nations, it can also be found in ethnic stores in the UK, Canada, Greece and the US. Calabash chalk is also eaten amongst women of African descent in the US state of Georgia.

== Composition ==
Calabash chalk is a naturally occurring material composed of fossilized sea shells. However, it can be prepared artificially by combining clay, sand, wood ash and even salt. By molding and heating this mixture, the calabash chalk is obtained. It is available as a powder, a molded shape or a block.

There are different views concerning the components of calabash chalk, the consensus being that the major component is aluminum silicate hydroxide. This comes from the kaolin clay group, making Al_{2}Si_{2}O_{5}(OH)_{4} a possible formula for calabash chalk. Calabash chalk is also known to have very high concentrations of lead. The European Union recommends (Commission Regulation, 2001) that the amount of lead in food should not exceed 1 mg/kg, however the amount of lead contained in calabash chalk has been reported (Codex Committee of Food Additives and Contaminants, 2003) to be between 10–50 mg/kg. In addition, its composition may also include: aluminum, persistent organic pollutants, silicon, alpha lindane, endrin, endosulfan 11, arsenic, and chromium.

== Uses ==
The practice of eating calabash chalk is observed by both sexes and different age groups of people of African descent, for the purpose of pleasure. However, it is prevalent among women, predominantly during pregnancy, who claim it prevents vomiting, over-salivation and nausea. Calabash chalk is also used to make facial masks and soaps.

== Health risks ==
When geophagical materials are consumed and come in contact with digestive fluids, they have the potential of releasing clinical or sub-clinical toxic effects on an individual. There are several reports regarding the health risks of consuming calabash chalk including; the alteration of the normal concentration of hemoglobin, red blood cell counts and erythrocyte sedimentation rate. Another possible side effect of eating this geophagia is the alteration of growth rate and de-mineralization in the femur bone. Other reports suggest that calabash chalk also causes numerous gastrointestinal disorders such as nausea, ulcers and gastritis. This stems from histomorphological changes that calabash chalk causes to the stomach and oesophagus.
