= Mud cake (dessert) =

Australian cake

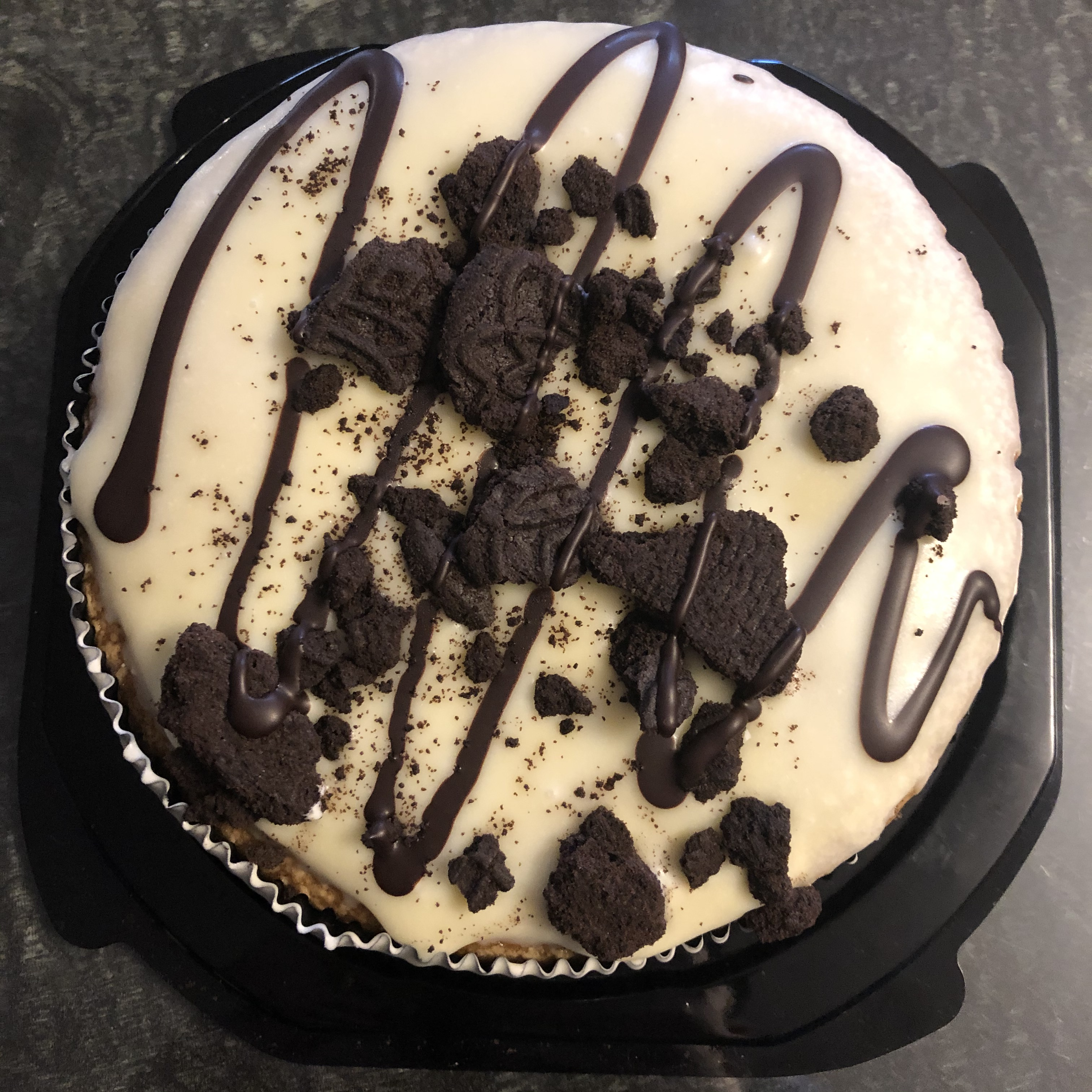
- A cookies and cream-flavoured mud cake
- Alternative names: Mudcake
- Type: Cake
- Course: Dessert
- Associated cuisine: Australian

Mud cake (or mudcake) is a dense, moist cake coated with a ganache. Although typically made with dark chocolate ('chocolate mud cake'), other flavours such as caramel and white chocolate are commonly available from Australian supermarkets. Despite its popularity as a birthday cake in Australian cuisine, it is suggested to be inspired by the mud pie found in American cuisine. Mud cakes increased in popularity in Australia over time, with the rise of mass production rendering the cakes readily available and a household staple.

Unlike some other chocolate cakes, mud cakes are made with melted chocolate as well as cocoa powder. Additionally, they are baked for longer and at a lower temperature than other cakes, so as to retain moisture.

Supermarket mud cakes are popular in Australia, with Woolworths reporting 2.6 million sold annually (as of 2024) and Coles selling more than 2 million annually (as of 2026). Numerous flavour variations have been created by retailers over the years, such as hokey pokey, choc-chip, chocolate orange, fairy-bread, mint cookies and cream, rocky-road, and birthday cake.
