= Mudcrete =

Mudcrete is a structural material (employed, for example, as a basecourse in road construction) made by mixing mud (usually marine mud) with sand and concrete/cement. It is used as a cheaper and more sustainable alternative to rock fill. It is also used in such projects as land reclamation.
