= Ampo (snack) =

Indonesian snack made of soil

Ampo is a food made of soil originating from Central Java and East Java, Indonesia and eaten as a snack or light meal. It consists of pure clay, without any mixture of ingredients.

== Characteristics and preparation ==
Ampo is made from gravel-free dark earth that is formed into thin spiral strips, then baked and smoked in a large clay pot for a half hour before serving. A wooden stick is used to beat the soil into a solid hard substance, where these spirals of dirt are removed with a dagger made of bamboo. Methods and production are passed on generationally, and the taste differs based on the quality of the soil. Ampo is said to have a cool and creamy texture.

== Habit ==
Ampo is revered by the native women who are pregnant.

Generally, a habit of eating clay can be referred to as geophagy, which in some cultural contexts may indicate a type of disordered eating called pica. However, the consumption of ampo or other soil-based cultural foods and medicines should not be automatically considered pica according to the DSM-V, which specifies that eating disorders such as pica should only be diagnosed when they are "not part of a culturally supported or socially normative practice."

== Impact on health ==
Ampo has become a traditional food that is trusted by the people in the island of Java, especially people in Central Java and East Java. It is believed to strengthen the digestive system. It is also believed to be a drug that can treat several kinds of diseases.

=== Health benefits ===
In a Science Digest article (Paraquat: a Potent Weed Killer is Killing People), it is recommended that a paraquat poisoning victim promptly swallow dirt, even at the risk of salmonella, because paraquat is deactivated upon contact with soil. Otherwise, a sufficiently lethal dose would cause damage to the liver, kidneys, and especially the lungs, usually causing death by asphyxiation by causing severe fibrosis. Lung transplants in two victims merely delayed their deaths because chemical levels still in their bodies subsequently damaged the transplanted lungs, too.

There is some evidence that supports the usefulness of the flora found in soil. It has been suggested that it is useful in the establishment of healthy bacteria within the digestive tract, addressing the problems presented by Crohn's disease. The adsorbent qualities of clay have been demonstrated to cause the lining of the vertebrate gut to change both on a cellular and acellular level, potentially protecting the gut from chemical insults as well as alleviating ailments such as esophagitis, gastritis, and colitis.

=== Health risks ===
There are risks in the consumption of ampo and clay that is contaminated by animal or human feces; in particular, parasite eggs, such as roundworms, that can stay dormant for years, can present a problem. Tetanus poses a further risk. Nevertheless, these risks are generally well understood by most tribal populations that engage in geophagy, hence 'clean' earth from below the surface level is sought out. Children's predilection to engage in geophagy makes them more susceptible to worm infestations. Other dangers associated with geophagia include damage to tooth enamel, the ingestion of a variety of potentially harmful bacteria, various forms of soil contamination, and intestinal obstruction.

In the traditional societies, ampo is produced by heat-treating (baking) the earth before consumption, and this tends to mitigate the risks to some extent.

There is a psychological hypothesis which is centred on the cravings reported by clay eaters. Researchers' attention was directed mainly towards pregnant and postpartum women and their emotional states. Geophagy was attributed to feelings of misery, homesickness, depression, and alienation.

== See also ==
- Marl
