= Lithophagy =

Ingestion of stones

Lithophagy is an ingestion of stones. The term comes from Greek roots λίθος + φᾰγω.

The term was suggested in 1922 by Pyotr Dravert. In Russian literature the term may also refer to geophagia.

== Discussion ==
Stones are found ingested by many animals. These called gastroliths. In many cases the reason for this is unknown. Stones may be ingested to grind food or to serve as a ballast for aquatic animals.

Walter Henry Medhurst describes a practice of "eating stones" in 19th-century China and Brian S-K Li reported eating of stones as a literary trope in late imperial China (ca. 1550–1800).

A street food fad of fried stones called suodiu or suodui (嗦丢) as reported in China in 2023.
