= Dorodango =

Japanese art form in which earth and water are molded to create a delicate shiny sphere

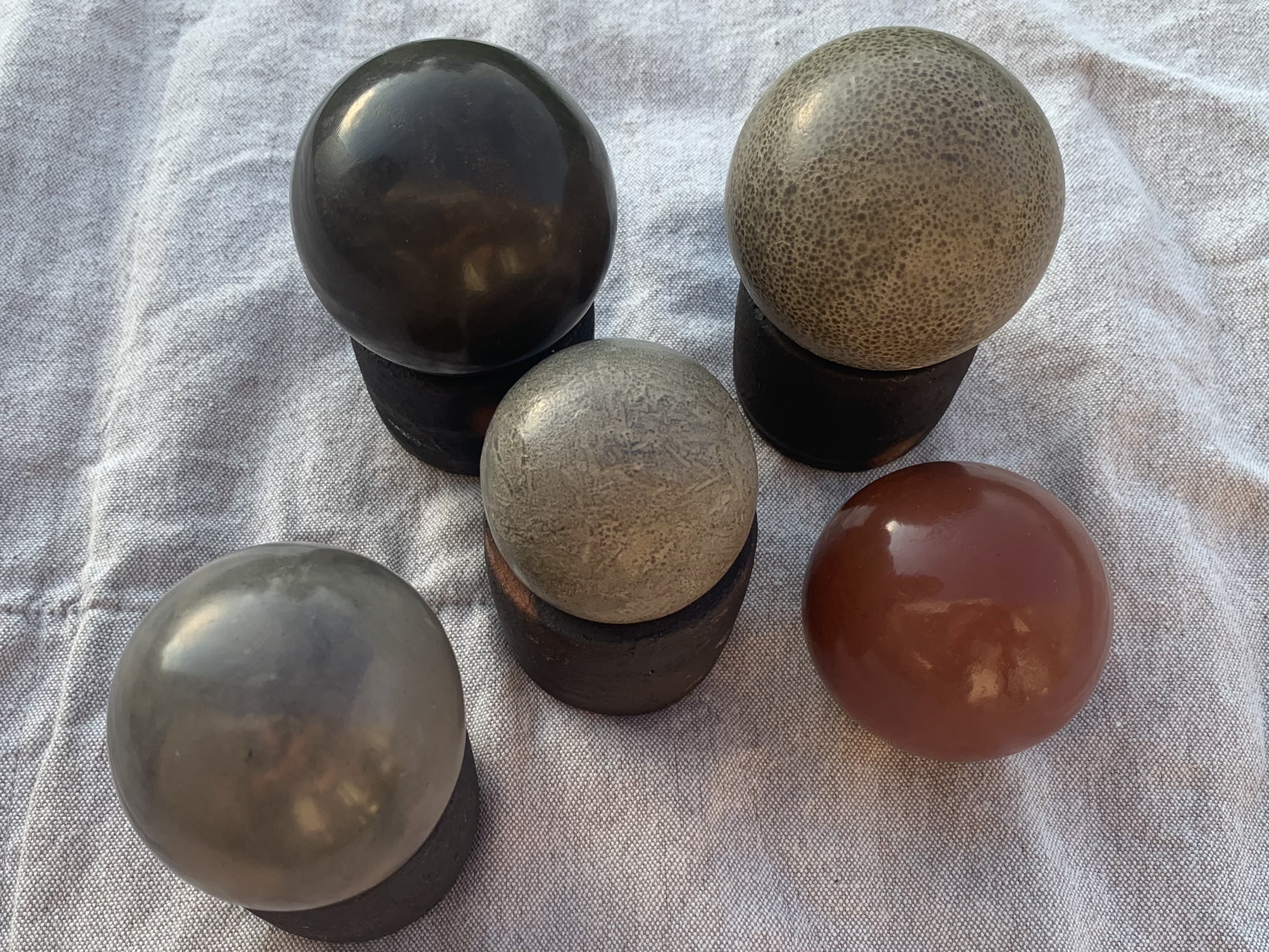
Dorodangos made with a variety of clay and different techniques

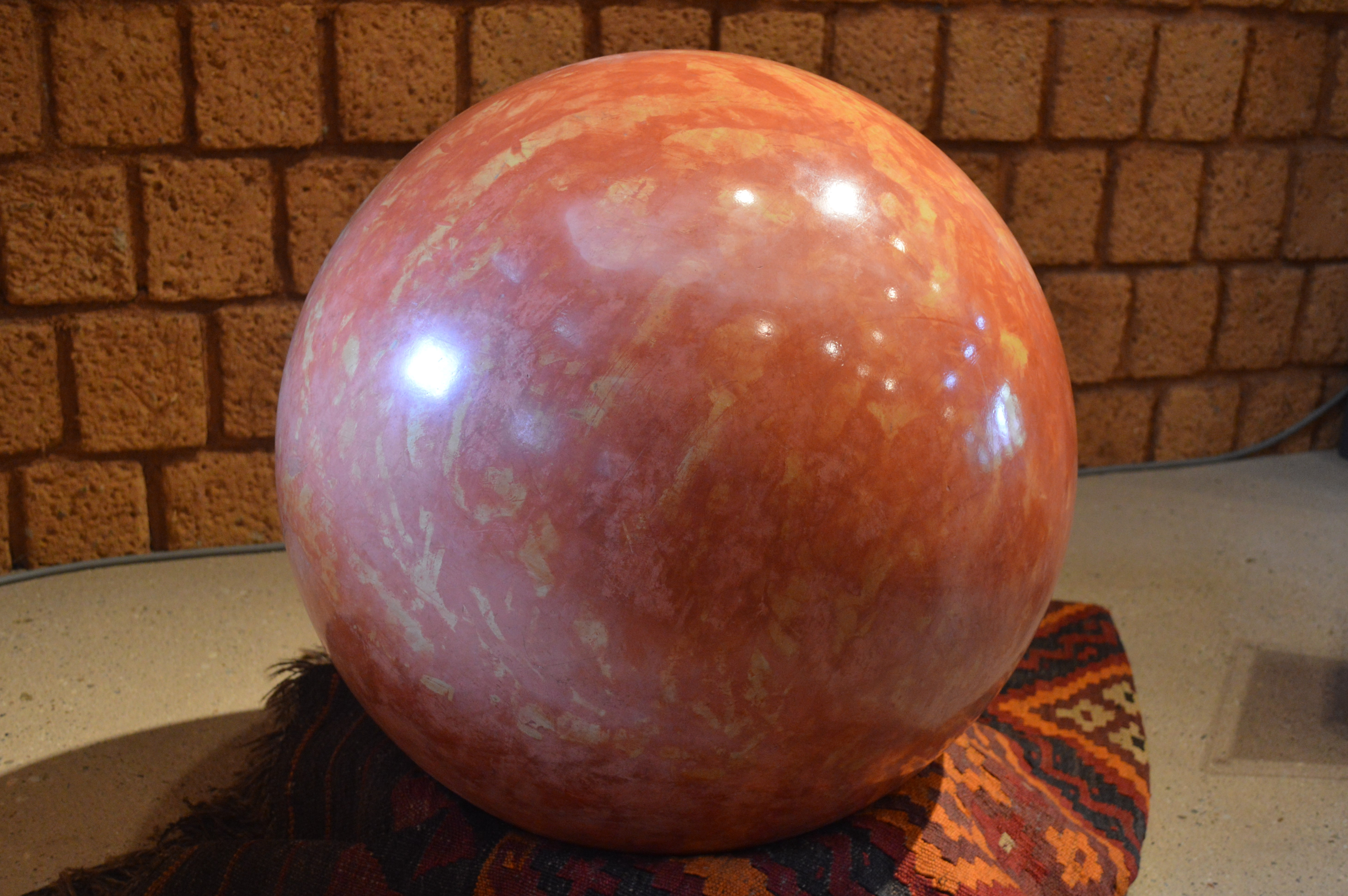
A large dorodango (54 cm or 21 in diameter)

Dorodango (Japanese: 泥だんご; lit. "mud dumpling") is a Japanese art form in which soil and water are combined and moulded, then carefully polished to create a delicate shiny sphere.

== Etymology ==
The phrase dorodango (泥だんご) is derived from the Japanese words doro (泥; lit. "mud") and dango (だんご; a type of round dumpling created from pressed rice flour).

== Technique ==
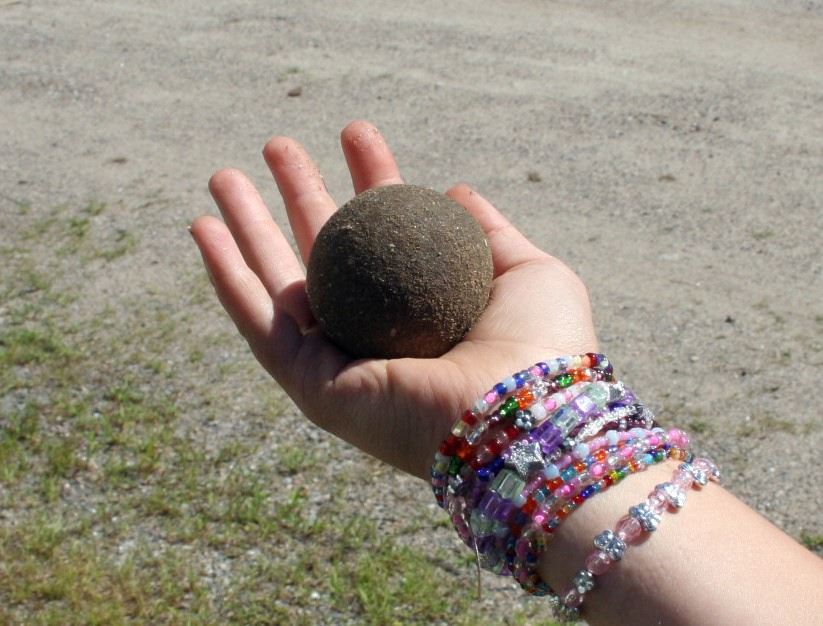
A dorodango at an early stage. In this case, it has yet to be polished, and so still has a rough and uneven texture.

Making the basic dorodango is a traditional pastime for school children.

More recently, the process has been refined into the art of the hikaru ("shining") dorodango (光る泥だんご), which has a glossy surface. Several different techniques can be used. Across all methods, a core of the ball is made of basic mud, which has been carefully shaped by hand to be as round as possible. This core is left to dry, and then methodically and carefully dusted with finely sifted soil to create a crust several millimeters thick around the core. This step may be repeated several times, with finer and finer grains of dirt in order to create a smooth and shiny surface. A cloth then may be used to gently polish the surface. The dorodango, once completed, may look like a polished stone sphere, but it is still very fragile. The process requires several hours and careful focus so as not to break the ball.

== In popular culture ==
In Christopher Paolini's novel series The Inheritance Cycle, protagonist Eragon witnesses Orik, the King of the Dwarves, carrying out a Dwarvish tradition of making an erôthknurl. The process of making an erôthknurl is highly similar to the process of making dorodango.

In the Discovery Channel series MythBusters episode "End with a Bang" (Episode 113), which first aired on November 12, 2008, hosts Adam Savage and Jamie Hyneman investigated the truth behind everyday sayings. They used the dorodango technique to create dung spheres in order to bust the myth that one "can't polish a turd". Using a glossmeter, they measured gloss levels substantially higher than the value of 70 gloss units, which is considered "high gloss". Savage's 106-gloss unit dorodango used an ostrich's feces, while Hyneman's 183-gloss unit specimen used a lion's feces. They therefore deemed the myth "busted".

In episode 14, "Footsteps", of the anime series Your Lie in April, the character Tsubaki Sawabe polishes a dorodango to show to the protagonist, Kousei, in a flashback sequence. However, it shows it being broken in the next episode (Liar) when she shows it to Kousei, representing her feelings for Kousei in the present day.

== See also ==
- Mud pie – Children's activity
