= Dirt cake =

Type of American dessert

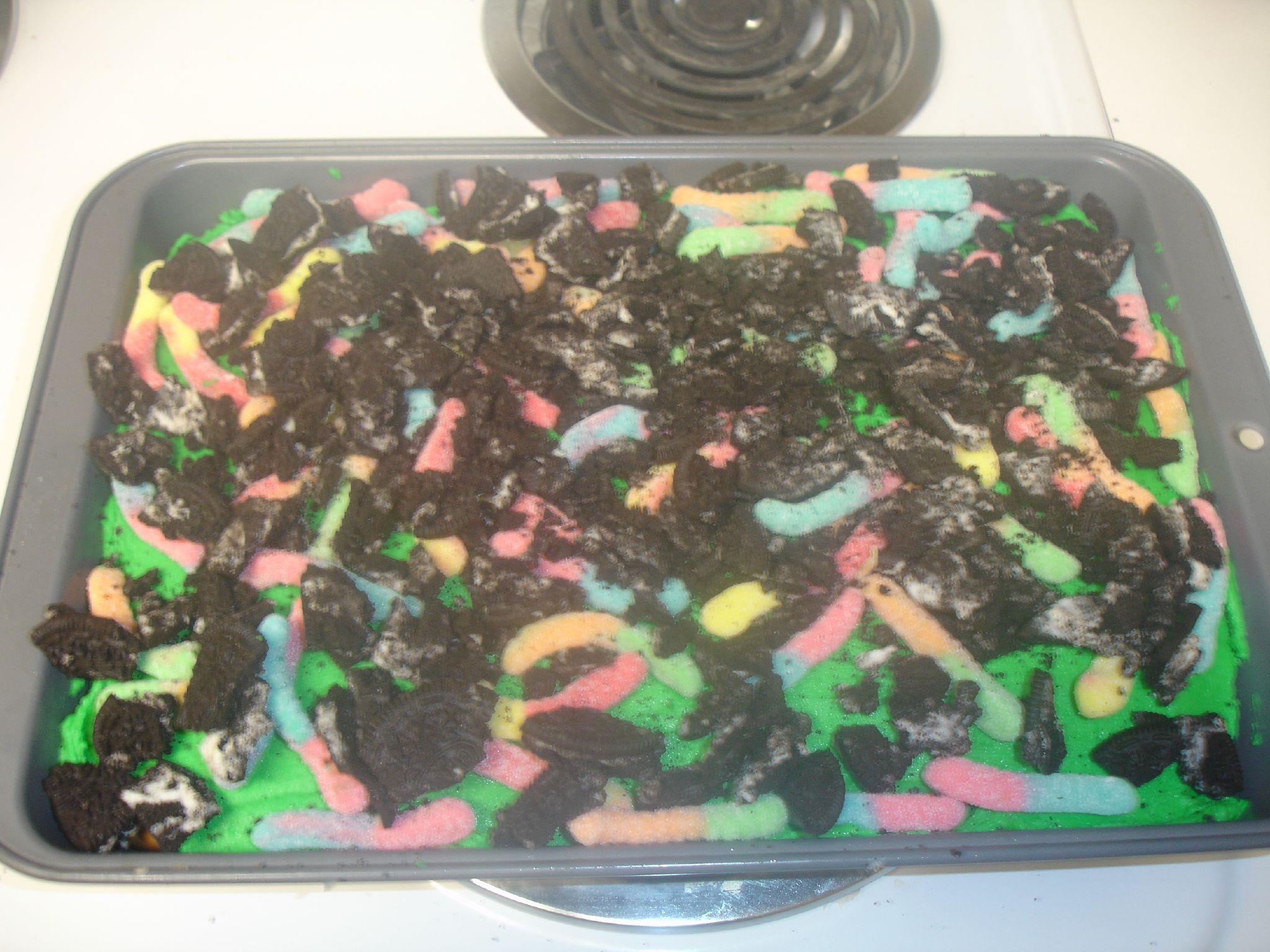
- Gummy worm dirt cake
- Type: Cake
- Place of origin: United States
- Main ingredients: Oreos, pudding or cream cheese, gummy candy

Dirt cake, also called dirt and worms, is an American cake made from cookies and pudding in combination with other ingredients to create a dessert that has a resemblance to soil or earth. It is made by combining crushed Oreo cookies on top of vanilla or chocolate pudding, and adding gummy candy worms on top. Variations include vanilla wafers, vanilla pudding, whipped cream or Cool Whip, and cream cheese pudding in the recipe.

Several bakeries in Singapore sold dirt cakes served in flowerpots after the dessert appeared on the Taiwanese show A Hint of You. In 2016, chefs in Bangalore created a dirt cake weighing 1,078 kg, setting a Guinness world record. In 2024, Oreo released a limited edition Dirt Cake flavor cookie.

== See also ==
- Mississippi mud pie
- Mud pie, an inedible item created as part of a children's pretend game
