= Mud cookie =

Haitian food

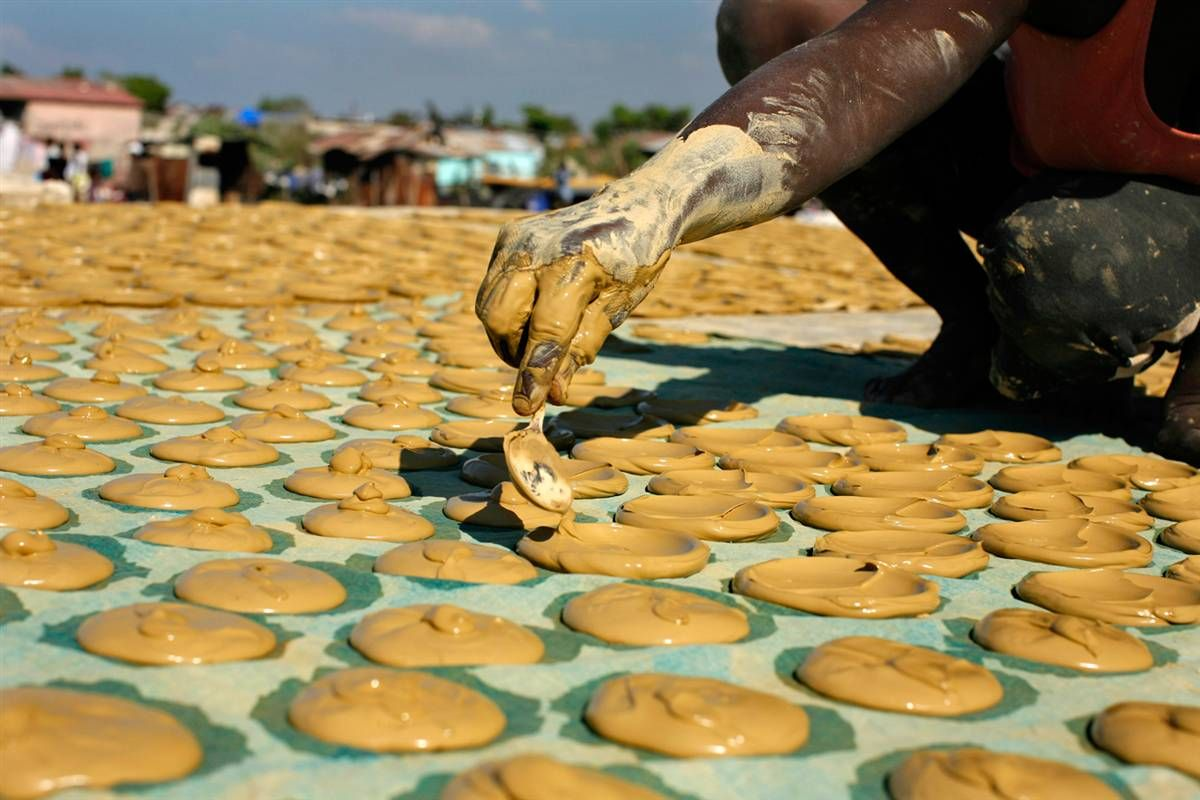
- Mud cookies being prepared
- Alternative names: bonbon tè (Haitian Creole)
- Place of origin: Haiti
- Main ingredients: Dirt; Fat
- Ingredients generally used: Vegetables; Salt

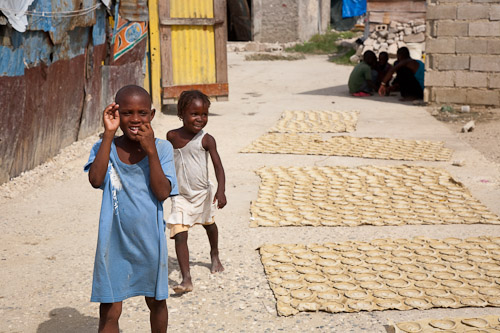
Mud cookies drying in the sun

A mud cookie (Haitian Creole: bonbon tè, lit. 'earth cookie', pronounced [bɔ̃bɔ̃ tɛ]) is a famine food that is eaten in Haiti by children or expectant mothers. They can be found in slums like Cité Soleil. Dirt is collected from the nation's central plateau, near the town of Hinche, and trucked over to the market (e.g. La Saline market) where women purchase it. It is processed into cookies in shanty towns such as Fort Dimanche. First, the dirt is strained to remove rocks and clumps. Then, the dirt is mixed with salt (and/or rarely sugar) and vegetable shortening or other fat. Next, it is formed into flat discs, and dried in the sun. The finished product is finally transported in buckets and sold in the market or on the streets.

Due to their mineral content, mud cookies were traditionally used as a dietary supplement for pregnant women and children. Many Haitians believe they contain calcium which could be used as an antacid and for nutrition, but this is disputed by doctors who warn of tooth decay, constipation, and other complications. The production cost is cheap; the dirt to make one hundred cookies was five US dollars in 2008 (about 5 cents apiece), even after increasing by $1.50 since 2007. It is also seen as a way to stave off starvation. This is especially true in times where there is a rise in global food prices such as during the 2007–08 world food price crisis.

The taste has been described as having a smooth consistency that immediately dries the mouth, with a pungent aftertaste of dirt that lingers for hours.

== See also ==
- Ersatz good
- Geophagia – Practice of eating earth or soil-like substrates
- Mud pie
- Pica
- Sawdust bread
