= Mud pie =

Children's activity

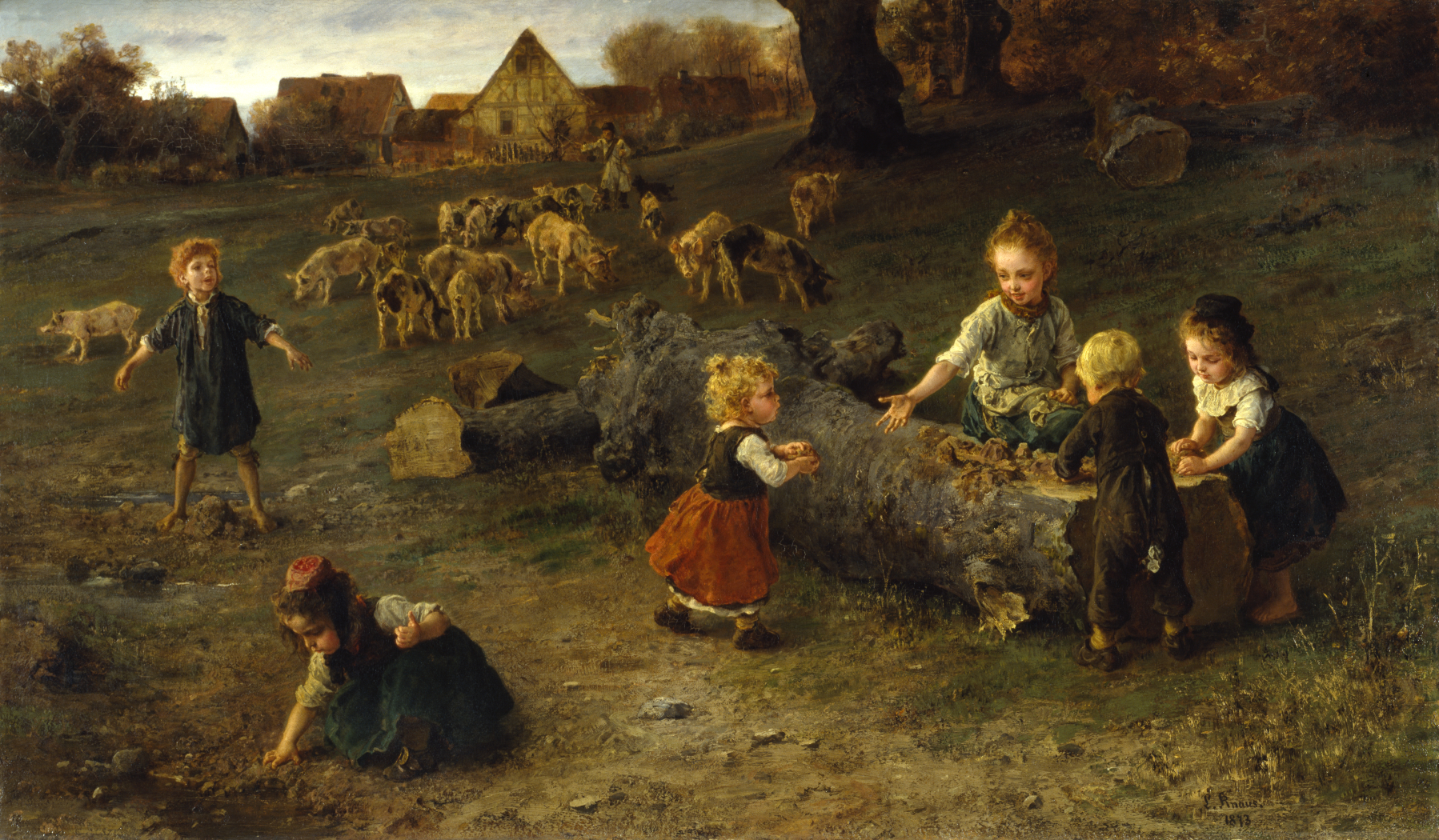
Mud Pies by Ludwig Knaus

Making a mud pie is a children's activity or game that consists of creating a mixture of water and soil and playing or pretending to make food or a pie. Mud pies are not meant to be eaten, although they can be thrown in the face. A broader category describes this activity as mud play.

== Description ==
Mud pies are composed of a mixture of water and soil. Other ingredients are sometimes added to the basic water and soil mixture such as plants and pebbles. The 'pie' will stay together if the mud is sticky – similar to bread dough. In addition to mud pies, children often create other structures like mud sandwiches and mud-based tea parties.

Creating a mud pie can be a very enjoyable activity and is thought to nurture the imagination of a child. Making mud pies allows the exploration of textures, and establishes the basis of scientific reasoning as they change the variables such as the addition of less water or even freezing the mixture. Some children do not enjoy the activity. A child may hesitate to "get dirty."

Many people recall this childhood activity with fondness. An author recounts: "As a child, I was drawn to mud. Some of my fondest childhood memories saw me covered in the stuff, head to toe."

== Techniques ==
Digging a small hole, adding water and stirring with a stick is one method used by children to create the mud pie. Some choose to organize a party or event for children with creating mud pies as part of the activities. The benefits of making mud pies include strengthening the sense of touch and developing "true" creativity. Some take a more formal approach to the activity and dedicate children's play spaces to the making of mud pies. A mud pie kitchen (sometimes just called mud kitchen) can be created to make other mud play 'food'; these can be adapted from indoor play kitchens or appear similar, built personally or bought commercially. A mud center can be created in a school setting. Some teachers are able to incorporate art and music into mud pie-making activities during school.

Other ingredients have been proposed, including:

- sawdust
- eggshells
- orange peel
- crushed leaves
- sand

Washing up afterwards is to be expected.

== Other uses ==
Some desserts made out of crushed cookies and other ingredients are called mud pies or puddings.

== See also ==
- Dirt cake, an edible dessert somewhat resembling a mud pie
- Boryeong Mud Festival
- Dorodango, moulding earth and water into polished spheres
- Mud cookie
