= Geophagia =

Practice of eating earth or soil-like substrates

Geophagia (/ˌdʒiːəˈfeɪdʒ(i)ə/), also known as geophagy (/dʒiˈɒfədʒi/), is the intentional practice of consuming earth or soil-like substances such as clay, chalk, or termite mounds. It is a behavioural adaptation that occurs in many animals and has been documented in more than 100 primate species. Geophagy in primates is primarily used for protection from parasites, to provide mineral supplements and to help metabolize toxic compounds from leaves. Geophagy also occurs in humans and is most commonly reported among children and pregnant women.

Human geophagia is a form of pica – the craving and purposive consumption of non-food items – and is classified as an eating disorder in the Diagnostic and Statistical Manual of Mental Disorders (DSM) if not socially or culturally appropriate. Sometimes geophagy is a consequence of carrying a hookworm infection. Although its cause remains unknown, geophagy has many potential adaptive health benefits as well as negative consequences.

== Animals ==
Geophagia is widespread in the animal kingdom. Galen, the Greek philosopher and physician, was the first to record the use of clay by sick or injured animals in the second century AD. This type of geophagia has been documented in "many species of mammals, birds, reptiles, butterflies and isopods, especially among herbivores".

=== Birds ===
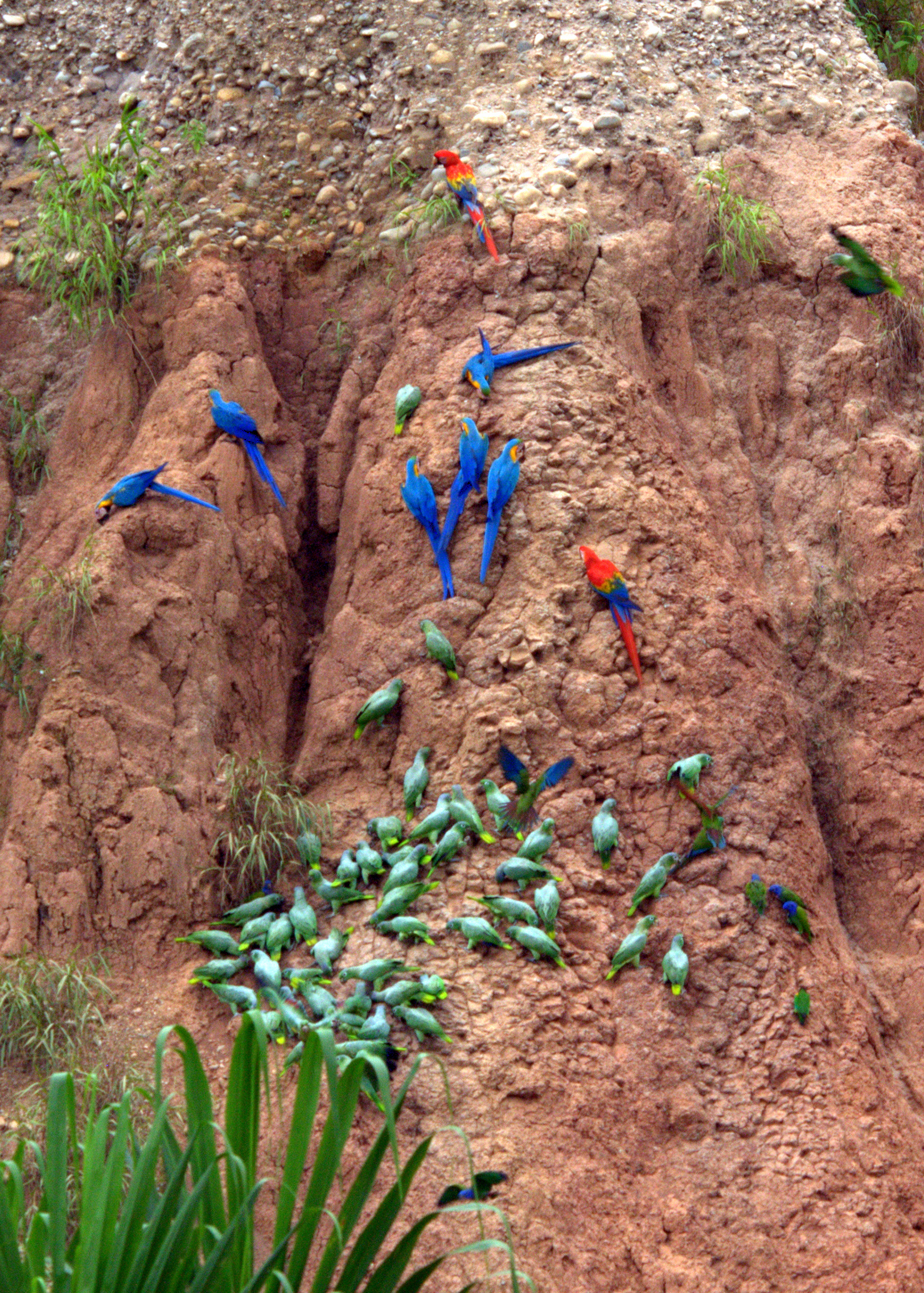
Parrots eating earth

Many species of South American parrots have been observed at clay licks, and sulphur-crested cockatoos have been observed ingesting clays in Papua New Guinea. Analysis of soils consumed by wild birds show that they often prefer soils with high clay content, usually with the smectite clay families being well represented.

The preference for certain types of clay or soil can lead to unusual feeding behaviour. For example, Peruvian Amazon rainforest parrots congregate not just at one particular bend of the Manu River but at one specific layer of soil which runs hundreds of metres horizontally along that bend. The parrots avoid eating the substrate in layers one metre above or below the preferred layer. These parrots regularly eat seeds and unripe fruits containing alkaloids and other toxins that render the seeds and fruits bitter and even lethal. Because many of these chemicals become positively charged in the acidic stomach, they bind to clay minerals which have negatively charged cation-exchange sites, and are thereby rendered safe. Their preferred soils have a much higher cation-exchange capacity than the adjacent, rejected layers of soils because they are rich in the minerals smectite, kaolin, and mica. The preferred soils surpass the pure mineral kaolinite and surpass or approach pure bentonite in their capacity to bind quinine and tannic acid.

In vitro and in vivo tests of these soils and many others from southeastern Peru indicate that they also release nutritionally important quantities of minerals such as calcium and sodium. In the Manu River example cited above, the preferred soil bands had much higher levels of sodium than those that were not chosen. Repeated studies have shown that the soils consumed most commonly by parrots in South America have higher sodium contents than those that are not consumed.

It is unclear which factor is driving avian geophagy. However, evidence is mounting that sodium is the most important driver among parrots in southeastern Peru. Parrots are known to eat toxic foods globally, but geophagy is concentrated in very specific regions. Researchers Lee et al. show that parrot geophagy in South America is positively correlated to a significant degree with distance from the ocean. This suggests that overall lack of sodium in the ecosystem, not variation in food toxicity, is a better predictor of the spatial distribution of geophagy. This work, coupled with the recent findings of consistently high sodium levels in consumed soils, make it highly likely that sodium is the primary driver of avian geophagy among parrots (and possibly other taxa) in the western Amazon Basin. This supplemental nutrients hypothesis is further supported by peak geophagy occurring during the parrots' breeding season.

=== Non-human primates ===
Silky sifaka (Propithecus candidus) eating earth

There are several hypotheses about the importance of geophagia in bats and primates. Chimpanzees in Kibale National Park, Uganda, have been observed to consume soil rich in kaolinite clay shortly before or after consuming plants including Trichilia rubescens, which possesses antimalarial properties in the laboratory.

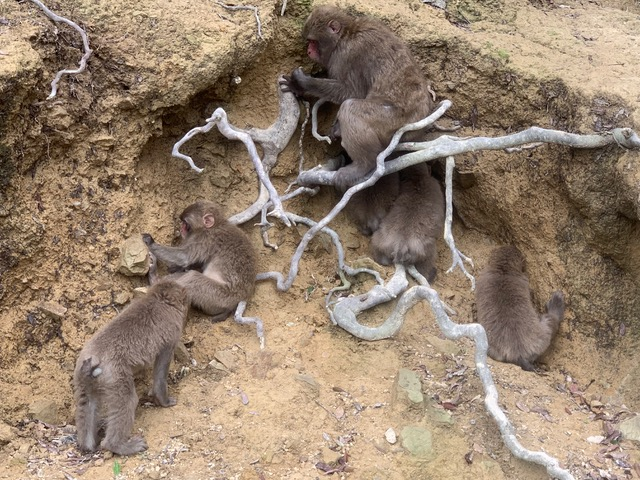
Five Japanese macaques eating soil

Geophagy is a behavioural adaptation seen in 136 species of nonhuman primates from the suborder Haplorrhini (81%) and Strepsirrhini (19%). The most commonly ingested soils are soils from mounds, soils from tree bases, soils from termite mounds, 'Pong' soils, and forest floor. Studies have shown many benefits of geophagy such as protection from parasites (4.9%), mineral supplements (19.5%), and helping to metabolize toxic compounds from leaves (12.2%) nonexclusive. From soil analysis, it has been seen that one of the main compounds in the earth consumed by these primates is clay minerals that contains kaolinite, which is commonly used in medications for diarrheal and intestinal problems. Geophagic behaviour plays an important role in nonhuman primates' health. This kind of zoopharmacognosy use differs from one species to another. For example, mountain gorillas from Rwanda tend to ingest clay soil during dry season, when the vegetation changes forcing them to feed on plants that have more toxic compounds, in this case the ingested clay absorbs these toxins providing digestive benefits. This kind of seasonal behavioural adaptation is also seen in the red-handed howler monkeys from the western Brazilian Amazonia, which also have to adapt to the shift of feeding on leaves that contains more toxic compounds. In other cases, geophagy is used by the Ring-Tailed Lemurs as a preventive and therapeutic behaviour for parasite control and intestinal infection. These benefits from clay ingestion can also be observed among rhesus macaques. In a study that was carried out in the island of Cayo Santiago, it has been observed that the rhesus macaques had intestinal parasites and their health was not affected and they did not have many gastrointestinal effects from these parasites. Data observed shows that this was caused by the consumption of clay soil by this species. On the other hand observations have shown that behavioural geophagy provides mineral supplements, as seen among Cambodia's Colobinae. The study was done at the salt licks in Veun Sai-Siem Pang Conservation Area, a site that is visited by various species of nonhuman primates. More in-depth research needs to be carried out in order to better understand this behavioural adaptation of geophagy among nonhuman primates.

=== Bats ===
There is debate over whether geophagia in bats is primarily for nutritional supplementation or detoxification. It is known that some species of bats regularly visit mineral or salt licks to increase mineral consumption. However, Voigt et al. demonstrated that both mineral-deficient and healthy bats visit salt licks at the same rate. Therefore, mineral supplementation is unlikely to be the primary reason for geophagia in bats. Additionally, bat presence at salt licks increases during periods of high energy demand. Voigt et al. concluded that the primary purpose for bat presence at salt licks is for detoxification purposes, compensating for the increased consumption of toxic fruit and seeds.

=== Livestock ===
The hooves of livestock such as cattle and sheep collect soil and press it against vegetation of pastures on which they graze, causing ingestion for soil. It can be observed as a function of ash content in the feces. This is common especially in weak, poorly drained soils, which easily break apart. In autumn and winter, wetter conditions render soil muddier and hence more transferrable. Other factors are the density of livestock grazing and the consumption of earthworm casts. In sheep, soil consumption can also cause cumulative incisor tooth wear. Since the soil contains various nutrients such as iron, manganese, zinc, cobalt, copper, selenium, and iodine that herbage lacks, it contributes to nutrition of grazers.

== Humans ==
=== Anthropological and historical evidence ===
Evidence for the likely origin of geophagy was found in the remains of early humans in Africa:

The oldest evidence of geophagy practised by humans comes from the prehistoric site at Kalambo Falls on the border between Zambia and Tanzania (Root-Bernstein & Root-Bernstein, 2000). Here, a calcium-rich white clay was found alongside the bones of Homo habilis (a potential predecessor of Homo sapiens).

— Peter Abrahams, Geophagy and the Involuntary Ingestion of Soil

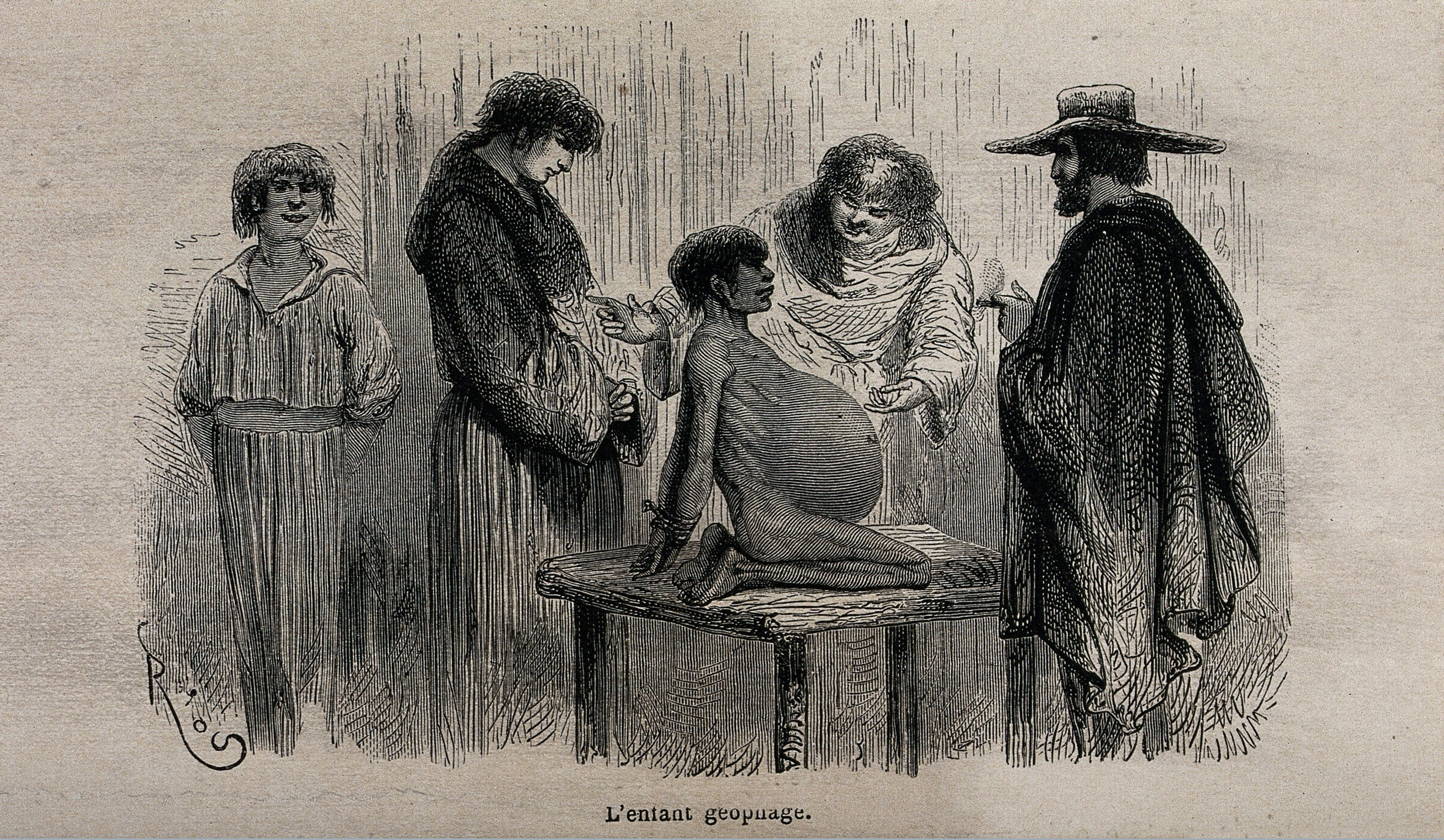
A five-year-old girl in Peru with a desire to eat earth (geophagia). Wood engraving by E. Riou, 1860s.

Geophagia is very common around the world in tribal and traditional rural societies (although it has not reliably been documented in some parts of East Asia.) In the ancient world, several writers noted the phenomenon of geophagia. Pliny is said to have noted the ingestion of soil on Lemnos, an island of Greece, and the use of the soils from this island was noted until the 14th century. The textbook of Hippocrates (460–377 BCE) mentions geophagia, and the famous medical textbook titled De Medicina edited by A. Cornelius Celsus (14–37 CE) seems to link anaemia to geophagia. One of Rumi's fables tells about a geophage being cheated by a sugar seller who leaves him alone with a weight made of clay and then waits until the man eats enough of it, thus reducing the amount of sugar he will get.

The existence of geophagy among Native Americans was noted by early explorers in the Americas, including Gabriel Soares de Sousa, who in 1587 reported a tribe in Brazil using it in suicide, and Alexander von Humboldt, who said that a tribe called the Otomacs ate large amounts of soil. In Africa, David Livingstone wrote about slaves eating soil in Zanzibar, and it is also thought that large numbers of slaves brought with them soil-eating practices when they were trafficked to the New World as part of the transatlantic slave trade. Slaves who practised geophagia were nicknamed "clay-eaters" because they were known to consume clay, as well as spices, ash, chalk, grass, plaster, paint, and starch.

According to Ferdynand Ossendowski as well as contemporary ethnographic accounts from no later than the early 20th century, the Poleshuks, an East Slavic ethnographic group descended from the Drevlian tribe who settled the marshy region of Polesia, were known to mix white clay or silt into the flour intended for bread, along with the dried and ground herb of Chenopodium album. This practice was most prominent in the late winter and very early spring, when extreme hunger was common and led to the innovation of such traditionally passed-down culinary practices to induce satiety.

=== Contemporary practices ===
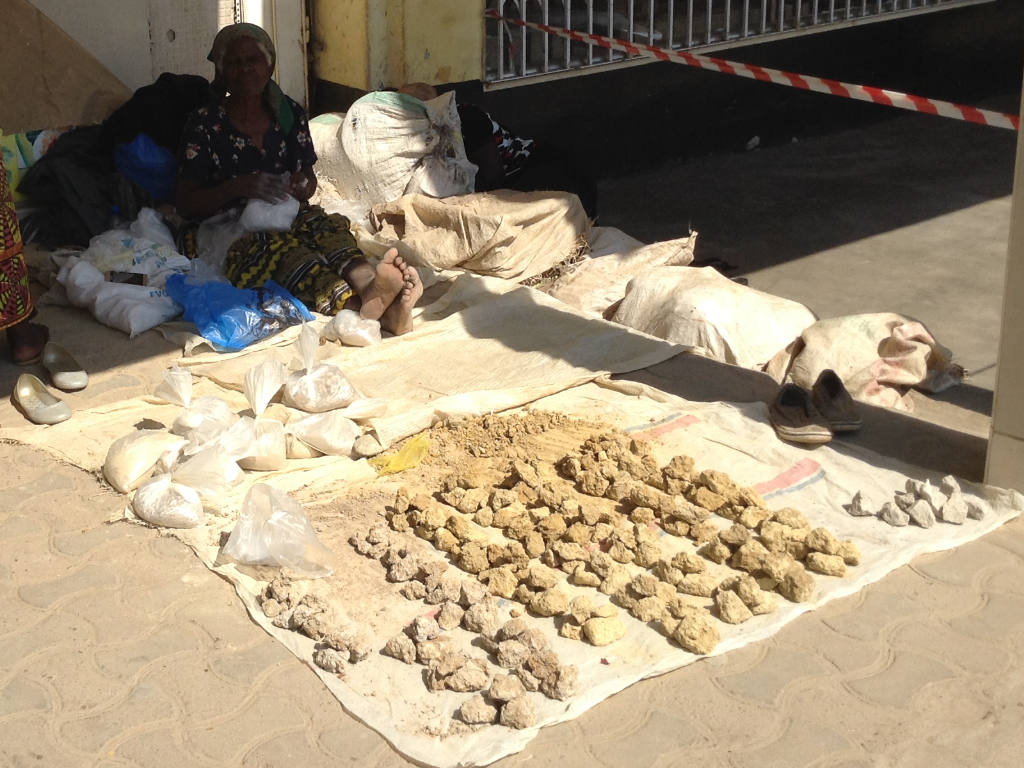
Several different rocks of clay-like material being sold at a local market in Kabwe, Zambia. These are usually purchased and consumed by pregnant women.

In Africa, kaolinite, sometimes known as kalaba (in Gabon and Cameroon), calaba, and calabachop (in Equatorial Guinea), is eaten for pleasure or to suppress hunger. Kaolin for human consumption is sold at most markets in Cameroon and is often flavoured with spices such as black pepper and cardamom. Consumption is greatest among women, especially to cure nausea during pregnancy, in spite of the possible dangerous levels of arsenic and lead to the unborn child. Another example of geophagia was reported in Mangaung, Free State Province in South Africa, where the practice was geochemically investigated. Calabash chalk is also eaten in west Africa.

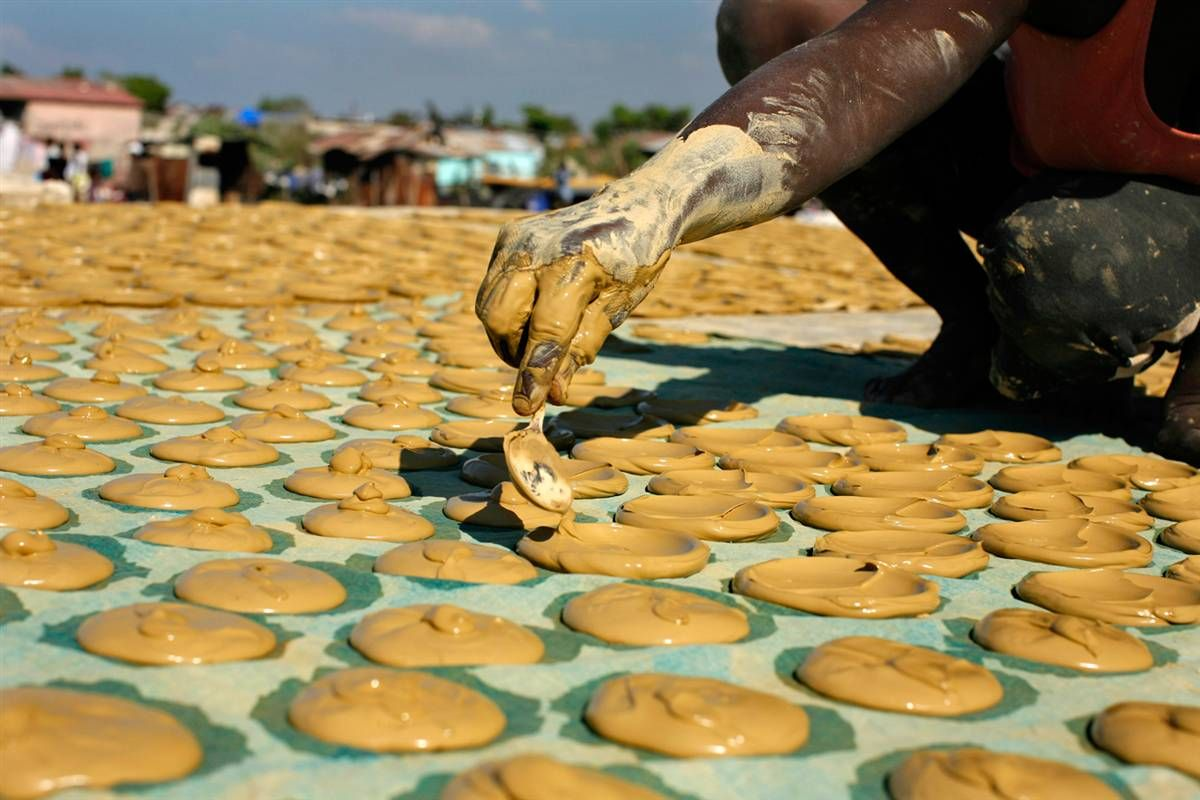
Haitian mud cookies being prepared

In Haiti, poor people are known to eat bonbon tè made from soil, salt, and vegetable shortening. These biscuits hold minimal nutritional value, but manage to keep the poor alive. However, long-term consumption of the biscuits is reported to cause stomach pains and malnutrition, and is not recommended by doctors.

Some Southern African American communities consume kaolin as a supplement and traditional medicine, particularly for pregnant women. The practice was reportedly declining by 1984 but has continued In some communities well into the 21st century.

In Central Java and East Java, Indonesia a food made of soil called ampo is eaten as a snack or light meal. It consists of pure clay, without any mixture of ingredients.

Bentonite clay is available worldwide as a digestive aid; kaolin is also widely used as a digestive aid and as the base for some medicines. Attapulgite, another type of clay, is an active ingredient in many anti-diarrheal medicines.

=== Impact on health ===
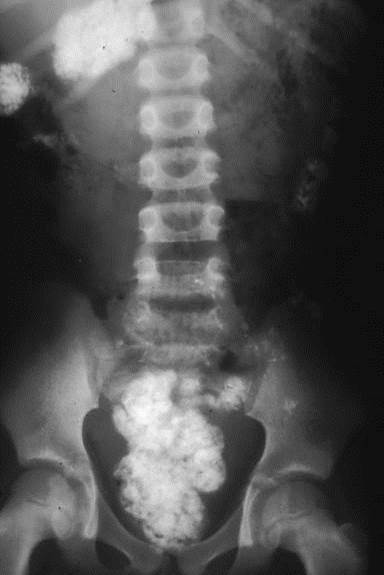
Silica in the soil that has been eaten by a woman shows up as white on this plain X-ray

Clay minerals have been reported to have beneficial microbiological effects, such as protecting the stomach against toxins, parasites, and pathogens. Humans are not able to synthesize vitamin B12 (cobalamin), so geophagia may be a behavioral adaptation to obtain it from bacteria in the soil. Mineral content in soils may vary by region, but many contain high levels of calcium, copper, magnesium, iron, and zinc; these minerals are critical for developing fetuses, which may explain cravings by pregnant women to chew metallic objects, soil, ice cravings. Pregnant women may also experience ice-chewing cravings or drives towards specifically cold food to trigger vasoconstricting, which increases brain oxygen levels by restricting neck veins; both cravings, soil and ice, may have familial and environmental links. Multigenerationally-impoverished villages and other homogenous, socioeconomically-closed genetic communities are more likely to have rewarded gene expression of soil or clay consumption, because such cravings increased the likelihood of survival through multiple pregnancies for both sexes.

There are obvious health risks in the consumption of soil that is contaminated by animal or human feces; in particular, helminth eggs, such as Ascaris, which can stay viable in the soil for years, can lead to helminth infections. Tetanus poses a further risk. Lead poisoning is also associated with soil ingestion, as well as health risks associated with zinc exposure can be problematic among people who eat soils on a regular basis. Gestational geophagia (geophagia in pregnancy) has been associated with various homeostatic disruptions and oxidative damage in rats.

== See also ==
- Medicinal clay, a variety of clays chosen and used for medicinal purposes, including through consumption.
- Lithophagy, ingestion of stones
