= Mississippi mud pie =

Chocolate-based dessert pie

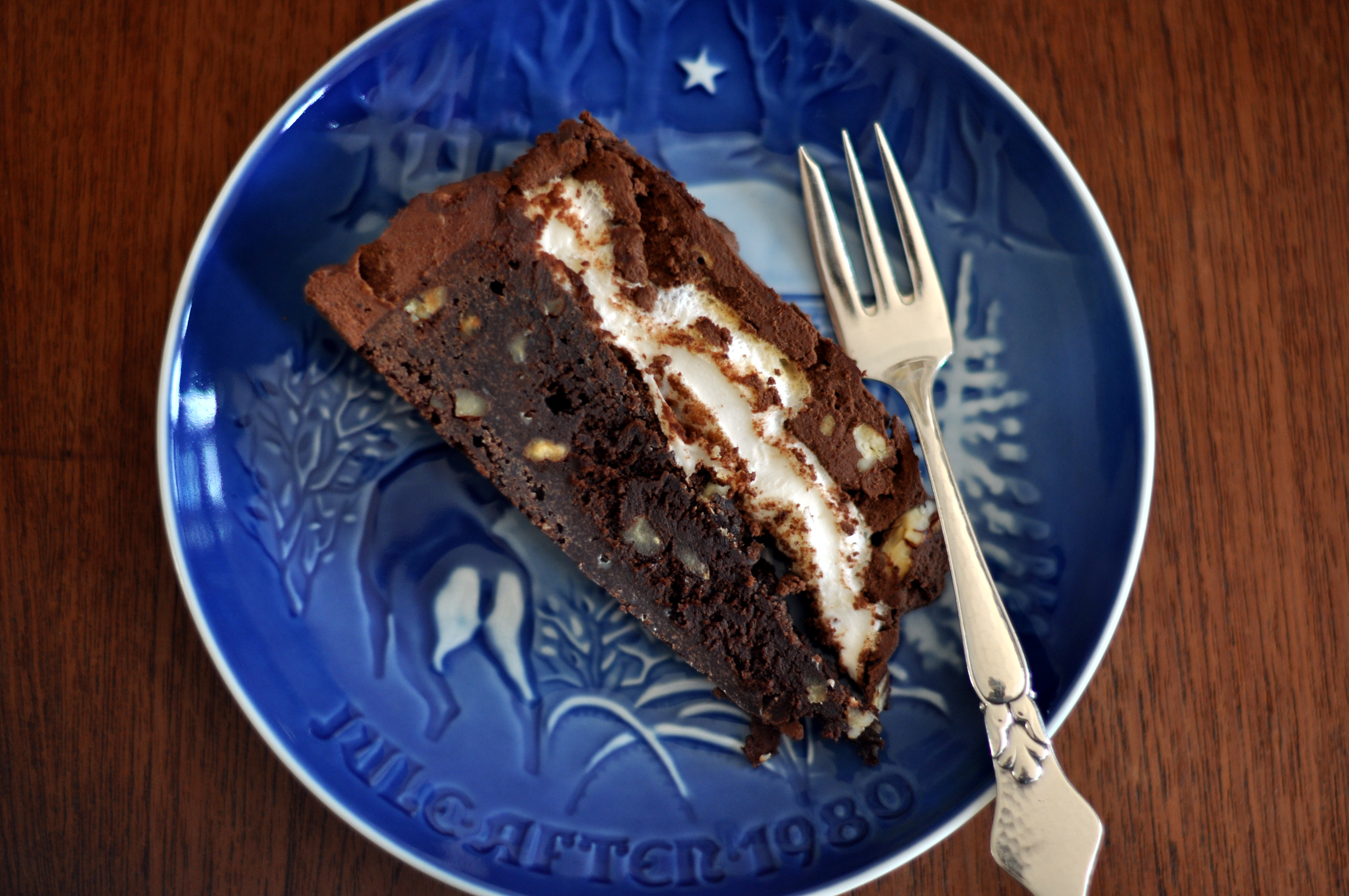
- Alternative names: Mud pie
- Type: Pie
- Course: Dessert
- Place of origin: United States
- Region or state: Mississippi
- Main ingredients: Chocolate, sugar, butter

Mississippi mud pie is a chocolate-based dessert pie that is likely to have originated in the U.S. state of Mississippi, hence the name. It typically contains a gooey chocolate sauce, brownie and chocolate custard on top of a crumbly chocolate crust. It is usually served with ice cream, but can also be served alongside whipped cream, boiled custard, or vanilla yogurt. Its name is due to its resemblance to mud.

While Mississippi mud pie was originally associated with Southern United States cuisine, the dish is enjoyed throughout the U.S. and beyond.

== Varying ingredients ==
Recipes for Mississippi mud pie may involve various additional ingredients. These varying ingredients may include marshmallows, pecans, walnuts or liqueur.

== History ==
The name "Mississippi mud pie" is derived from the dense cake that resembles the banks of the Mississippi River. Its earliest known reference in print is dated 1975.

Mississippi mud pies may have begun in the 1970s as a variation on mud cake, a dessert which was popular in the American South during World War II.

Another story says that Mississippi mud pie may also have originated from the Vicksburg-Natchez area near Jackson, Mississippi in the 1920s. In this version, a woman named Jenny Meyer worked as a waitress in the Vicksburg area after having lost her home when the Mississippi River flooded. During one of her shifts, the waitress noted that a melting chocolate pie resembled the Mississippi River's muddy banks, which is how the dessert gained its name.

== See also ==
- Devil's food cake
- Dirt cake
- List of desserts
- List of regional dishes of the United States
