= Salvadoran military intervention in Haiti =

2026 anti-gang mission

- Part of the Haitian conflict
- Salvadoran soldiers arriving in Haiti on 29 October
Date	21 October 2026 (Note: El Salvador has had military personnel in Haiti supporting the Gang Suppression Force since 3 January 2025, but the personnel served in non-combat roles. El Salvador escalated its military involvement on 21 October 2026.) – present (1 month and 1 day)
Location	Ouest Department, Haiti
Status	Ongoing

Belligerents
El Salvador; Haiti; Gang Suppression Force (Note: At the time of the Salvadoran intervention, the GSF consisted of soldiers from Bangladesh, Chad, El Salvador, Guatemala, Jamaica, Mongolia, and Sri Lanka.); Task Force mercenaries; Logistical support: United States; Colombia; Dominican Republic	Haitian gangs; 400 Mawozo; Chèn Méchan; Viv Ansanm; Boston gang; Taliban gang; Other gangs

Commanders and leaders
Nayib Bukele; Roberto Figueroa; Alix Didier Fils-Aimé	Wilson Joseph; Mathias Saintil X; Jeff Larose

Strength
2,000–2,500 Salvadoran soldiers (Note: Most sources since 28 October 2026 have reported that El Salvador has 2,000 soldiers in Haiti, but some report that there are 2,500 soldiers.); 1,500+ GSF soldiers; 7 Salvadoran helicopters	Unknown

Casualties and losses
3 Salvadorans killed, 1 injured (Note: The US embassy reported that 3 more soldiers were injured before 10 November, but El Salvador denies the report.) (non-combat)	~74 killed
- 26+ civilians killed, 30 civilians wounded

Since 21 October 2026, El Salvador has been conducting a military intervention in Haiti following a gang ambush on 18 October that resulted in four Salvadoran aviation technicians of the Gang Suppression Force (GSF) being kidnapped. According to Salvadoran president Nayib Bukele, the intervention's primary objective is to rescue the four technicians, while threatening to "finish" the Haitian gangs if the technicians are not rescued alive.

A gang conflict has engulfed Haiti since 2020 with gangs taking control of much of the country, including most of the capital, Port-au-Prince. In 2023, the United Nations Security Council established the Multinational Security Support Mission (MSS, later reorganized as the GSF) to help the Haitian government combat gangs. El Salvador began supporting the GSF in January 2025 in non-combat roles and had at least 124 personnel in Haiti by October 2026. After Haitian gangs attacked and kidnapped the four Salvadoran technicians, Bukele announced the beginning of a military operation to rescue them. Salvadoran troops began arriving in Haiti on 22 October, since November, El Salvador has deployed 2,000 to 2,500 soldiers to Haiti, and more than the 1,500 GSF troops in Haiti. Salvadoran troops began conducting search and rescue operations on 30 October. On 8 November, a joint operation involving Salvadoran forces destroyed a house belonging to Wilson Joseph—the leader of the 400 Mawozo gang—that was allegedly the gang's headquarters. According to Armed Conflict Location and Event Data, at least 100 people have been killed during the intervention as of 11 November 2026.

Haitian forces and the GSF are directly supporting the Salvadoran intervention. Furthermore, the United States, Colombia, and the Dominican Republic have provided El Salvador logistical support in transporting Salvadoran personnel and equipment to Haiti. Most Salvadoran troops in Haiti are operating independently from the GSF. Some analysts have accused the intervention of being an invasion, which both Bukele and Haitian prime minister Alix Didier Fils-Aimé deny. According to a CID Gallup opinion poll, the majority of Salvadorans approve of the intervention; a majority of Haitian civilians have rallied in support of the intervention, while some have been coerced by gangs to protest against it under threat of violence. Joseph has called for the United Nations to mediate peace talks between El Salvador and the gangs, which the Salvadorans have rejected.

== Background ==
In May 2020, Haitian gangs launched several attacks in various neighborhoods of Port-au-Prince, the capital city of Haiti, to secure and expand their territory. Since then, a gang war has engulfed much of Haiti. After the 2021 assassination of Jovenel Moïse, the president of Haiti, gangs expanded their control and influence throughout Haiti, some of which had connections to political parties. By June 2023, gangs controlled most of Port-au-Prince and thousands had died due to gang-related violence. In October 2023, the United Nations Security Council established the Multinational Security Support Mission (MSS) at the request of the Haitian government to provide peacekeeping in the country.

The first Salvadoran soldiers to arrive in Haiti on 3 January 2025

In March 2024, Salvadoran president Nayib Bukele remarked that his government could solve the gang war in Haiti. Since 2022, Bukele's government had overseen a nationwide crackdown on gangs in El Salvador resulting in 78,175 arrests by March 2024. On 30 October 2024, the Legislative Assembly of El Salvador approved a decree that authorized the deployment of Salvadoran military personnel to Haiti until October 2026 to support the MSS with medical evacuations. On 3 January 2025, El Salvador deployed eight Salvadoran Air Force personnel to Haiti, and in February 2025, it deployed a further 70 soldiers. In October 2025, the UN Security Council reorganized the MSS as the Gang Suppression Force (GSF). On 29 September 2026, the Legislative Assembly extended El Salvador's involvement in the GSF until October 2027. By then, El Salvador had at least 124 personnel in Haiti supporting the GSF.

From January to September 2026, over 5,700 people were killed or injured due to gang-related violence in Haiti, with a further 230 people kidnapped and 1,000 being raped. By October 2026, hundreds of gangs operated in Haiti, with some organized into large gang alliances such as G9 Family, Viv Ansanm, and G-Pèp. The International Crisis Group estimates that Viv Ansanm alone has 12,000 to 20,000 members. According to InSight Crime, the Haitian National Police (PNH) receives little supervision from the Haitian government leading to members allegedly engaging in criminal activity, with some PNH members supposedly having ties to gangs. Furthermore, the GSF was understaffed, only having 1,500 soldiers out of the 5,500 expected by autumn 2026.

== Kidnapping of Salvadoran technicians ==
The location of Croix-des-Bouquets, where Haitian gang members kidnapped the Salvadoran technicians

On 18 October 2026, Haitian gang members attacked an armored vehicle carrying four Salvadoran aviation technicians attached to the GSF in Croix-des-Bouquets (a commune near Port-au-Prince) with explosives while they were returning to base. The four technicians fled the destroyed vehicle but at some point later, gang members kidnapped the four technicians and took them hostage. No group has been officially identified as being responsible for the ambush nor has any group claimed responsibility.

Egriselda López and Mike Waltz, the respective Salvadoran and American ambassadors to the UN, condemned the attack and called for an international mission to rescue the technicians. The GSF and PNH conducted a helicopter offensive against gangs in Plaine du Cul-de-Sac near where the technicians disappeared, killing several gang members and injuring four GSF personnel.

== Chronology of the intervention ==
=== Deployment ===
On 21 October, Bukele wrote on X that gang members were holding the technicians as hostages and announced the beginning of a military operation to rescue them. In Bukele's X post, he wrote that the mission's sole goal was to rescue the four technicians alive and unharmed. He, however, threatened the Haitian gangs that if the technicians were not rescued alive, he would "finish" them like he "already finished with the gangs in El Salvador" ("nou deja fini ak gang yo nan El Salvador"). Bukele addressed the post directly to Haitian gang leaders. After Bukele's announcement, the GSF told La Prensa Gráfica that the operation involved ground units supported by helicopters. In a statement, the Haitian prime minister Alix Didier Fils-Aimé announced that the Haitian government intends to assert its authority over armed groups and that the release of the technicians was an "absolute priority".

On 22 October, El Salvador deployed 100 special forces soldiers to Haiti to assist in the search and rescue operation. By 28 October, the Salvadoran government stated that it had 2,000 troops deployed in Haiti, surpassing the GSF's 1,500 troops in Haiti. Since November, sources have varyingly reported that El Salvador has 2,000 to 2,500 soldiers in Haiti. El Salvador also deployed five MD Helicopters MD 500E and two Sikorsky UH-60 Black Hawk helicopters to participate in the rescue operation and to transport troops and supplies. The United States Southern Command (USSOUTHCOM) and the Colombian Aerospace Force helped transport El Salvador's soldiers to Haiti onboard Lockheed C-130 Hercules aircraft. Furthermore, the Dominican Republic helped facilitate the transport of Salvadoran personnel and equipment through its territory. Dominican president Luis Abinader stated that the country would assist El Salvador with logistics and intelligence.

On 29 October, Bukele wrote on X that the Salvadoran government was covering 90 percent of the costs of the intervention and that the deployment of soldiers and supplies to Haiti was nearly complete. He added that all Salvadoran forces would withdraw when the intervention concluded. Bukele later stated in a press conference that, if the gangs return the four technicians, all Salvadoran forces would leave Haiti immediately. On 16 November, Salvadoran justice minister Gustavo Villatoro reiterated that all Salvadoran troops would withdraw from Haiti once the technicians were recovered. Haitian justice minister Patrick Pélissier, with whom Villatoro was meeting, stated that Fils-Aimé wanted to expand the scope of the Salvadoran mission beyond the recovery of the technicians.

In response to the deployment of Salvadoran troops to Haiti, Krisla, a gang leader, published a video acknowledging that the GSF has "bigger weapons and more technology" than the gangs but that "we'll fight to the end". He added that "we didn't ask Bukele to come here, and we didn't ask Bukele to send soldiers here. Bukele has come here to protect his money at his soldiers' expense." Wilson Joseph, the leader of the 400 Mawozo gang, posted a video showing off ammunition saying that he would wait for the Salvadorans to arrive and that he would not flee the country.

=== Operations and patrols ===
On 30 October, Salvadoran troops conducted their first operation of the intervention when dozens of troops conducted patrols in Tabarre. There, they established a base of operations near the US embassy. Gang members fired gunshots at a Salvadoran convoy near the embassy the following day. On 2 November, Salvadoran troops in armored vehicles advanced into Plaine du Cul-de-Sac, reportedly killing at least a dozen 400 Mawozo and Chèn Méchan gang members. The PNH and GSF supported the Salvadorans in the operation. That day, the PNH recovered the destroyed armored vehicle that transported the four kidnapped technicians in Croix-des-Bouquets.

External videos
- Video of Salvadoran helicopters attacking Wilson Joseph's house
- Video of Salvadoran soldiers in the Sylvio Cator Stadium

On 3 November, Fils-Aimé expressed support for the Salvadoran intervention and reiterated that the Haitian government intends to assert its control over all Haitian territory. He stated that the PNH and Armed Forces of Haiti (FAd'H) would join the GSF and Salvadoran forces to form in a "common strategy" against the gangs. That night, Salvadoran helicopters repelled gang members in Croix-des-Bouquets who launched an attack against Chadian GSF soldiers. On 5 November, Mathias Saintil, the leader of the Boston gang, was killed in Cité Soleil by a loitering munition (self-destructing military drone) in an operation conducted by the PNH, the GSF, Task Force (a mercenary group founded by Erik Prince), and El Salvador. Saintil was the first Haitian gang leader to be killed in a military operation since 2024.

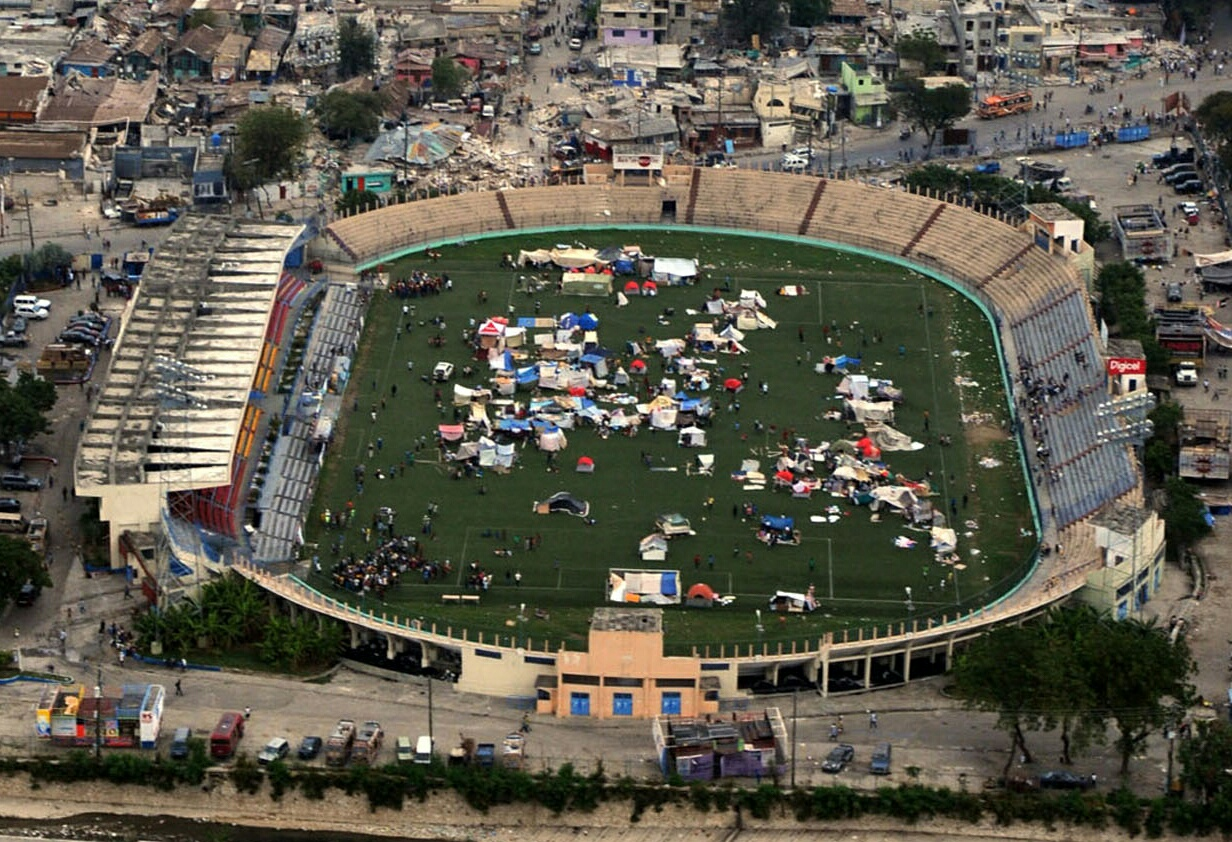
The Sylvio Cator Stadium in 2010

On 8 November, Salvadoran helicopters and a Task Force loitering munition launched an airstrike that destroyed a house belonging to Wilson Joseph (400 Mawozo's alleged headquarters), killing up to 20 gang members. The operation came days after Bukele asked users on X to identify the location of Joseph's home so that he could "destroy it". On 11 November, Fils-Aimé stated that the Salvadoran intervention was helping the Haitian government regain control of territory. The following day, Salvadoran troops and armored vehicles—along with personnel from the PNH, FAd'H, and Task Force—established a base inside the Sylvio Cator Stadium in downtown Port-au-Prince, which had previously been controlled by gangs since 2024. Bukele told gang members to leave the area or face "consequences" in a future military operation. On 18 November, Salvadoran helicopters destroyed a house in Canaan belonging to Jeff Larose, the leader of the Taliban gang, but it is unknown if Larose was killed. The GSF did not participate in the attack, and it is unclear if Haitian forces were involved.

=== Calls for mediation ===
On 1 November, Joseph asked the United Nations to mediate peace talks between El Salvador and the gangs, claiming to want a "peaceful solution to the national crisis". On 6 November, a 400 Mawozo spokesperson told the Associated Press (AP) that the gang was ready to enter peace negotiations and undergo disarmament in exchange for an end of "international interference" in Haiti. Salvadoran vice president Félix Ulloa rejected considering UN mediation with the gangs, describing it as "unacceptable".

== Casualties ==
Doctors Without Borders reported that 30 civilians were wounded by gunfire or explosions in Port-au-Prince between 18 and 26 October. Haitian civilians have also reported heavy gunfire and drone strikes possibly resulting in civilian deaths. At some point before 10 November, US chargé d'affaires to Haiti David Howell stated that three Salvadoran soldiers had been injured and that one had to be medically evacuated back to El Salvador. The Salvadoran government denied Howell's report and accused him of spreading false information. On 20 November, three Salvadoran soldiers were killed and another was injured when explosives they were handling detonated. According to the Armed Conflict Location and Event Data (ACLED) non-governmental organization (NGO), over 100 people have been killed during El Salvador's intervention, at least 26 of whom were civilians, as of 11 November 2026.

On 28 October, United Nations Association – Haiti (UNA–Haiti), an NGO that represents the Haitian diaspora, condemned El Salvador's intervention and demanded a UN investigation into its conduct. UNA–Haiti wrote a letter to António Guterres, the UN secretary-general, accusing the Salvadorans of carrying out aerial bombardments and helicopter attacks resulting in civilian deaths in Croix-des-Bouquets. Bukele criticized UNA–Haiti's statement, denying that Salvadoran forces deployed bombs and asserted that their helicopters arrived after the statement was published.

== Impact on Haitian politics ==
The Haitian government announced on 29 October 2026 that it would hold presidential and legislative elections in July 2027, with a second round in October if necessary. The elections will be the first held in Haiti since November 2016. The elections' conduct is partly reliant on the Salvadoran intervention improving the country's security, as the elections were previously scheduled to occur in December 2026 but the government postponed them due to gang violence. Jean-Marie Théodat, the director of the Department of Geography at the University of Paris, told France 24 that the intervention opened a window of opportunity for Haiti to hold elections.

On 20 November, Pélissier announced that it and El Salvador will build three new prisons to incarcerate gang members. The announcement came a few days after Pélissier visited El Salvador and toured the Terrorism Confinement Center supermax prison.

== Analysis ==
=== Legality ===
Sandra Pellegrini of ACLED questioned if Salvadoran forces would act outside of the GSF's jurisdiction in Haiti. She stated that operation parallel to the GSF could "undermine the legitimacy of the international mission to suppress the gangs" ("debilitar la legitimidad de la misión internacional de supresión de las pandillas"). Günther Maihold, a Latin American studies professor at the Free University of Berlin, raised concerns that the intervention could be against international law if operating outside of the GSF.

On 2 November 2026, UN spokesman Stéphane Dujarric stated that the majority of Salvadoran troops are operating outside of the GSF's jurisdiction. According to Dujarric, the Salvadoran intervention is a bilateral matter between El Salvador and Haiti. The following day, Fils-Aimé stated that Salvadoran troops were "not here to replace the state" but to support Haitian and GSF troops fighting the gangs. He added that the Haitian government was responsible for what foreign troops were present in the country. While Salvadoran troops attached to the GSF report to GSF commander Major General Erdenebat Batsuuri, those sent as a part of the intervention are commanded by Salvadoran colonel José Roberto Figueroa Amaya. Amnesty International has called for El Salvador and Haiti to disclose the terms of the Salvadoran deployment. On 16 November, Ulloa stated that the terms of the deployment would not be disclosed until "diplomatic conditions permit that it be public" ("condiciones diplomáticas lo permitan para hacerlo público") but that the deployment was nonetheless "legitimate".

Romain Le Cour, the head of the Haiti Observatory at the Global Initiative Against Transnational Organized Crime, questioned the framework of the Salvadoran chain of command and its rules of engagement. He also called for scrutiny on the extent of the United States' involvement in the intervention. Some critics accused the intervention of being an invasion or occupation, which Bukele, Fils-Aimé, and Ulloa denied.

=== Mission outcome ===
Bukele's intervention is now an overseas test of a security model with considerable political appeal. But its consequences will ultimately be measured by whether Haitians are safer when foreign forces depart.

— Robert Muggah, writing for The Conversation

Maihold told Deutsche Welle that the gang situations in El Salvador and Haiti are not comparable. He stated that the Salvadoran gangs largely did not put up an armed resistance to Bukele's crackdown, and contrasted that situation to Haiti where gangs are more extensive and have deeper connections to security forces. Le Cour noted that many Haitian prisons were largely emptied in 2024 and that the judicial system is ineffective which would make implementing a Salvadoran-style crackdown difficult. Former Pentagon official Francisco O. Mora told The Economist that the Salvadorans may face difficulties as Bukele "does not know the terrain or the tactical environment".

Vanda Felbab-Brown, a senior fellow at the Brookings Institution, has speculated that if there are heavy civilian casualties or the intervention becomes prolonged, the Salvadorans could be seen by the Haitians as an invading force. José Miguel Cruz, a criminology professor at the Florida International University, predicted that the security situation in Haiti would worsen as a result of the intervention. He argued that it would cause backlash from both the gangs and from Haitian civilians who would perceive the intervention as a violation of Haiti's national sovereignty. Théodorat speculated that the Salvadorans found more success in combating Haitian gangs than previous missions such as United Nations Stabilization Mission in Haiti (deployed from 2004 to 2017) as they have directly confronted the gangs militarily and could have an "empathetic ideal" to help Haiti.

=== Geopolitical implications ===
Le Cour stated that the Salvadoran intervention could set a regional precedent where a country could withdraw from international missions to alter their rules of engagement. He added that if the Salvadoran intervention is a quick success, Bukele "will evolve from being the architect of a prison model to an actor capable of conducting military interventions beyond his own borders" ("pasaría de ser el promotor de un modelo carcelario a un actor capaz de intervenir militarmente fuera de sus fronteras"). Frances Robles, a contributor for The New York Times, similarly wrote that a successful intervention could boost Bukele's international standing "as the leader who pulled Haiti out of crisis when other nations either refused to help or were incapable". Robert Muggah, a co-founder of the Igarapé Institute, wrote that the intervention is "the first overseas test of Bukele's security model". He added that, because El Salvador is a member of the US-led Shield of the Americas, other members could become involved as a part of anti-transnational crime cooperation.

Salvadoran historian Carlos López Bernal described the use of the Armed Forces of El Salvador in the intervention as being political in nature. He compared it to the 2003 to 2009 deployment of the Cuscatlán Battalion during the Iraq War, when Salvadoran presidents Francisco Flores and Antonio Saca sought to politically support the US. Adam Isacson, a security specialist at the Washington Office on Latin America, speculated that Bukele wants the intervention to boost his anti-crime reputation ahead of the 2027 Salvadoran presidential election. Muggah wrote that Salvadoran casualties could lead to domestic criticism ahead of the election and pressure a further escalation.

== Reactions ==
=== Haiti ===
Haitians in Port-au-Prince demonstrating in support of the intervention, 17 November

On 2 November, Haitian civilians in Plaine du Cul-de-Sac protested against the Salvadoran intervention under death threats from Viv Ansanm. In contrast, Edwin Paraison, a former consul of Haiti to the Dominican Republic, told reporters that the majority of Haitians support the intervention. Jean-Baptiste Elysée, the leader of the Independent Patriotic Voice (VIP) political party, expressed support for the intervention. Thousands of Haitians have marched in support of the intervention in several Haitian cities such as Belladère, Jérémie, Kenscoff, and Port-au-Prince, with some calling on the Salvadorans to extend their operations to other parts of the country.

=== El Salvador ===
Salvadoran journalist Leonel Herrera accused Bukele of launching the intervention in Haiti as propaganda to supposedly improve El Salvador's image and distract from economic conditions in El Salvador. Manuel Zometa, a lawyer, demanded government transparency on how the intervention is being funded. Rafael Aguirre, the Farabundo Martí National Liberation Front's presidential candidate in the 2027 election, remarked that the intervention was a "show" and an "unnecessary war". Bukele has responded to criticism of El Salvador's intervention on X by affirming his confidence that the gangs would be defeated and that God would grant the Salvadorans victory.

According to an opinion poll conducted by CID Gallup from 24 to 27 October, 86 percent of Salvadorans approved of the rescue mission in Haiti, but 82 percent also worried about the risks that Salvadoran personnel faced while carrying out the mission. Additionally, 51 percent had high confidence that the technicians would be rescued alive. Furthermore, 68 percent supported maintaining or increasing involvement in Haiti, and 73 percent believed that El Salvador's involvement in Haiti improved the country's image abroad.

=== United States ===
US president Donald Trump supported the Salvadoran deployment during a phone call with Bukele on 27 October, telling him "do what you have to do". Trump stated that the US would not supply El Salvador with equipment, however, remarking that "he [Bukele] doesn't need help". While Trump has expressed support for El Salvador, he also suggested that the four technicians may be dead. According to Axios, Bukele made a proposal to Marco Rubio, the US secretary of state, to increase El Salvador's role in combating gangs in Haiti with US materiel support as a sort of proxy. Rubio reportedly declined the offer, wanting to "keep Haiti off the radar". Rubio later told reporters that the Salvadorans should work in conjunction with the GSF to avoid friendly fire during anti-gang operations.

On 4 November, Howell told Fils-Aimé to order Salvadoran defense minister René Merino Monroy to halt operations until Salvadoran troops can coordinate with the GSF, fearing that they could kill GSF troops or civilians. The following day, the US embassy in San Salvador sent a formal complaint to the Salvadoran government denouncing a "lack of coordination" between El Salvador and the GSF. It also claimed that Salvadoran small arms fire hit the US embassy and almost injured a staffer. Bukele criticized Howell and the complaint, remarking that "[Trump] told me to do what we have to do, and now a bureaucrat is opposing it?" Salvadoran foreign affairs minister Alexandra Hill Tinoco stated that Salvadoran and GSF forces were already in coordination.

Irwin Stotzky, a human rights expert at the University of Miami, speculated that the US could be invested in the intervention's outcome as the Trump administration ended temporary protected status for 350,000 Haitians in the US earlier in 2026. Stotzky stated that the Trump administration wants to "make it appear as if it's safe to send 350,000 people back to Haiti".

=== Other countries ===
On 19 October, Guatemala deployed 50 soldiers to Haiti to join the GSF, one day after the ambush against the Salvadoran technicians. On 24 October, the Dominican Republic deployed 10,000 soldiers along its border with Haiti to reinforce it amidst the escalation of El Salvador's intervention in Haiti. José Ignacio Paliza, the Dominican minister of the presidency, stated that the Dominican government would "take the necessary steps to protect our integrity" should anything occur along the border.

== See also ==
- Haitian crisis (2018–present)
- List of wars involving El Salvador
- List of wars involving Haiti
- Other interventions in Haiti
  - Saint-Domingue expedition (1801–1803)
  - United States occupation of Haiti (1915–1935)
  - Operation Uphold Democracy (1994–1995)
  - Operation Secure Tomorrow (2004)
