= Ilona Szabó de Carvalho =

Brazilian political scientist and civic entrepreneur

- Born: May 31, 1978 (age 48); Nova Friburgo, Rio de Janeiro, Brazil
- Occupations: Co-founder and president of the Igarapé Institute

Ilona Szabó de Carvalho (born May 31, 1978) is a Brazilian political scientist and civic entrepreneur. She is a co-founder and president of the Igarapé Institute, an independent think-and-do tank focused on security, nature and climate. She is a coordinator of the Global Commission on Drug Policy. She is also the founder of the Green Bridge Facility, a gateway for green ventures in Brazil and the Amazon Basin, and RegeneraBioLab, a hub for protection, restoration and regenerative practices in the Atlantic Forest.

In 2020, Szabó was the only Brazilian included on the Prospect Magazine list "The world's top 50 thinkers 2020 Her position among the top 50 was later revealed to be fifth place. In 2019, Szabó was included among the "19 Women of 2010" by Universa, a website from UOL. In 2018, she received the Order of Merit for Public Security from the Brazilian Ministry of Public Security and the Office of the President of Brazil, and, in 2023, she was awarded the Bertha Lutz Diploma by the Brazilian Federal Senate.

== National and global networks ==
Between 2011 and 2016 Szabó was the executive-secretary of the Global Commission on Drug Policy, a network of former presidents, entrepreneurs and public intellectuals. She previously coordinated the Latin American Commission on Drugs and Democracy. During her tenure she was responsible for helping shape global strategy with former presidents, supreme court justices, business and world leaders, including Fernando Henrique Cardoso, Cesar Gaviria, Richard Branson and the former UN Secretary General Kofi Annan. She contributed to the production of reference documents on drug policy, which were used in the experiences of cannabis regulation in Uruguay and the peace agreement in Colombia.

Szabó received the Responsible Leader award from BMW Foundation. In 2015, she was named a Young Global Leader at the World Economic Forum and has been a keynote speaker at World Economic Forum events in Davos, Medellín, São Paulo, Dalian and Dubai. She is the co-founder of the AGORA movement and has launched a number of expert networks.

Between 2008 and 2011, Szabó was the Between 2008 and 2010, Szabó was the coordinator of the Latin American Commission on Drugs and Democracy, and between 2009 and 2011 she coordinated civil society participation for the Geneva Declaration on Armed Violence and Development, working with diplomats and grass-roots organizations around the world.

In the mid-2000s while working for the NGO Viva Rio, Szabó coordinated one of the world's largest disarmament campaigns and helped shape a national referendum to ban the sale of handguns to Brazilian citizens.

== Education ==
Szabó holds a master's degree in International Studies from the University of Uppsala in Sweden, a specialist degree in International Development, from University of Oslo and a bachelor's degree in International Relations. She was a Senior Fellow at Columbia University School of International Affairs and Public Administration (SIPA) and is an affiliated scholar at Brazil Lab at Princeton University.

She has joined several executive courses, such as in Global Leadership and Public Policy for the 21st Century at the Kennedy School at Harvard, Transformational Leadership at the Said Business School at Oxford University and a Management Course on Disarmament, Demobilization & Reintegration (DDR) at the Swedish National Defense College, Stockholm. In 1995 she spent a year at a Cultural Exchange Program in Latvia with the American Field Service (AFS).

Before working in the nonprofit sector, Szabó worked for almost five years in investment banks in Rio de Janeiro in the late 1990s.

== Media ==
Szabó is a columnist at Folha de S. Paulo. Between 2016 and 2018, she was a guest commentator on the Estúdio i program, broadcast on GloboNews, and has participated in other renowned interview programs on Brazilian television. Szabó is a frequent source for the media on the topics she works on, and her profile has been featured in publications such as O Globo newspaper, TPM magazine, Marie Claire magazine, El País, and Gol magazine.

She spoke at TED in 2014 and, in 2025, at the TED Countdown Summit in Nairobi, where she presented The World’s First “Nature Superpower”. She has also spoken at Davos and other World Economic Forum events Davos, Medellín, São Paulo, Dalian and Dubai between 2016 and 2023.

She is the author of three books: Drogas: As Histórias que Não te Contaram ("Drugs: The untold stories"), Segurança Pública para Virar o Jogo ("Public security to change the game"), published by Zahar in 2017 and 2018, and A Defesa do Espaço Cívico ("In defense of civic space"), published by Objetiva in 2020. She was also the co-script writer and researcher for the award-winning documentary Breaking the Taboo. From 2020 to 2022, Szabó was also the host of the podcast and TV series Você Pode Mudar o Mundo ("You can change the world").

== Boards ==
In 2022 she was invited by the United Nations Secretary-General to join his The High-Level Advisory Board on Effective Multilateralism, serving until 2024. She is a member of the board of the Fernando Henrique Cardoso Foundation, the Brazilian Center for International Relations (CEBRI), Re.green, the International Advisory Panel on Biodiversity Credits (IAPB), the World Economic Forum's Global Future Council on Natural Capital, and the Brazilian Presidency's Council for Sustainable Economic and Social Development.. She also serves on several national and global boards focused on security, nature and climate.

Szabó served on the board of the Drug Policy Alliance, on the advisory board of the Young Global Leaders of the World Economic Forum and presided the Public Security Council of the Rio de Janeiro State Industry Federation (FIRJAN). She was also a member of the Institute for Mobility and Social Development board and co-chair of the World Economic Forum Global Future Council on the Future of Nature and Security. She was a mentor of the Columbia Women's leadership network in Brazil, served as an international jurist for the Bloomberg Mayors Challenge in Latin America and for the MacArthur's Foundation $100 million initiative 100&Change. She has been a consultant for various international organizations such as the OECD, UNDP, EU, and several international NGOs, conducting evaluations throughout Latin America. Szabó has also provided support to grassroots organizations in their organizational development.

== Awards and recognition ==
=== Personal ===
- Bertha Lutz Diploma, Brazilian Federal Senate, 2023
- Finalist for the "Claudia Magazine Award", category public policy, 2019
- Order of merit of Public Security, Brazilian Ministry of Public Security and the Office of the President of Brazil, 2018
- Civic Entrepreneur, Political Action Network for Sustainability, 2016
- Medalha Mulher Cidadã Heloneida Studart, Nova Friburgo City Council, 2016
- Young Global Leader, World Economic Forum, 2015
- Responsible Leader, BMW Foundation, 2015

=== Igarapé's Institute Awards under her directorship ===
- 100 best NGOs in Brazil, Doar Institute (2019, 2021, 2022)
- Finalist for the Best Climate and Energy Think Tank award by Prospect magazine.
- Nominated for the "Faz Diferença" award by O Globo newspaper (2020)
- Best Social Policy Think Tank, Prospect, 2019
- 100 best NGOs in Brazil, Doar Institute, 2019
- Best Human Rights NGO in Brazil, Doar Institute, 2018
- 100 best NGOs in Brazil, Doar Institute, 2018
- Schmidt Family Foundation Award, 2014
- Social Impact Challenge, Google Brazil, 2014

== Brazilian National Council for Criminal and Penitentiary Policy ==
In early 2019, Ilona was nominated by Brazilian Minister of Justice and Public Security Sergio Moro to a voluntary advisory position at the Brazilian National Council for Criminal and Penitentiary Policy, a consulting board which conducts assessments of the penitentiary system, proposes criminal policy guidelines and do inspections of penal establishments, among other duties. Due to massive attacks by extremists supporters of the Brazilian far-right government on social media, Ilona was removed from the council by the minister on the order of President Jair Bolsonaro.

== Family ==
Szabó is of Hungarian descent. She has a daughter, and is married to Canadian economist and academic Robert Muggah, who is also co-founder of the Igarapé Institute.

== Publications ==
- Green, Clean and Safe: Analytical Dimensions and Metrics for 21st Century Brazilian Agriculture — Working Paper, Igarapé Institute (2021, editor)
- Technology Solutions for Supply Chain Traceability in the Brazilian Amazon: Opportunities for the Financial Sector — Policy Paper, Igarape Institute (2020; with Fergunson, B. and Sekula, J)
- Environmental Crime in the Amazon Basin: A Typology for Research, Policy and Action — Policy Paper, Igarape Institute (2020; with Abdenour, A., Fergunson, B. Muggah, R., Risso, M.)
- What is Behind Brazil's Homicide Decline? — Technical Note, Igarape Institute (2019; with Robert Muggah)
- Segurança Pública é Solução — Policy Paper, Igarape Institute (2018, editor)
- Rio Seguro — Policy Paper, Igarape Institute (editor, 2018)
- Making Cities Safer: Citizen Security Innovations from Latin America — Strategic Paper, Igarape Institute (2016; with Robert Muggah, Nathalie Alvarado, Lina Marmolejo and Ruddy Wangwith)
- Measurement Matters: Designing New Metrics for a Drug Policy That Works — Strategic Paper, Igarape Institute (2015; with Robert Muggah and Katherine Aguirre)
- Política de Drogas no Brasil: A Mudança Já Começou — Strategic Paper, Igarape Institute (2014; with Ana Paula Pellegrino)
- Taking Control: Pathways for Drug Policies that Work — Report, Global Commission on Drug Policy (2014)
