= The Edelstein Center for Social Research =

Think tank in Rio de Janeiro, Brazil

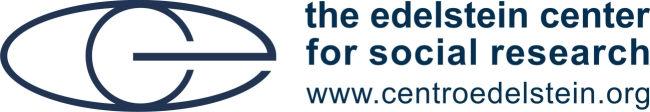
- Founded: 2004
- Founder: Joel Edelstein
- Purpose: To develop research and communication infrastructure to enhance Latin American democratic institutions
- Location: Rio de Janeiro, Brazil
- Coordinates: 22.9841°S 43.2046°W
- Method: Research, Policy Reports, Books Series and Virtual Libraries
- Website: www.centroedelstein.org.br/English

The Edelstein Center for Social Research is a Brazilian think tank based in Rio de Janeiro, that: 1) promotes research and publications designed to improve public policies and institutions to enhance democracy and social justice in Latin America; 2) fosters the dialogue between social actors and knowledge producers to disseminate internationally Latin American social sciences production and research institutions; 3) develops free access virtual libraries, data banks and the translation of Latin American social research works into English.

== History and staff ==
The Edelstein Center was established in 2004, by Joel Edelstein, a USA citizen living in Brazil. From its inception is directed by Bernardo Sorj and the Board of Advisors includes Adama Samassékou (Mali), Angelina Peralva (France), Daniel Pécaut (France), Giorgio Alberti (Italy), Guillermo O'Donnell (in memoriam, Argentina), Jean-Michel Blanquer (France) Julio Cotler (Peru), Sérgio Costa (Germany), Shepard Forman (United States) and Simon Schwartzman (Brazil).

In 2007, in association with the Instituto Fernando Henrique Cardoso founded the Democratic Platform Project.

In 2009-2010, the Edelstein Center was one of the sponsors of the Latin American Initiative on Drugs and Democracy. The other organizations were Instituto Fernando Henrique Cardoso and the Open Society Institute.

In 2010-2011, the Edelstein Center was part of the secretariat of the Global Commission on Drug Policy.

== Programs ==
The Information Society in Latin America

This research program concentrates on the impact of new information and communications technology on the transformation of Latin America's education system, public space and democratic life. Recently the Edelstein Center has completed a research on the use of computers and Internet by public school teachers in Rio de Janeiro. The study indicates that even when they have a positive impact, they cannot be separated from the educational and human context. A comprehensive policy needs to properly training teachers, in particular confronting the difficulties of the older generation, use monitored software, and adequate maintaining the physical infrastructural and technical support for school computer labs.

Civil Society and Globalization Agendas

The Civil Society and Globalization Agendas research program focuses on the current changes in Latin America’s civil society. Civil society played an important role in the promotion of democracy during the period of military dictatorships. However, more recently, civil society organizations have expanded and changed profoundly. While continuing to play an important role in the defense of human rights, in many countries civil society has become a vehicle for political parties, individual politicians, unions and social movements to channel public funds for their own benefit and/or political cooptation.

Virtual Libraries

The Edelstein Center Virtual Library of Human Sciences develops and offers free access to a set of virtual libraries with 55.000 titles in constant expansion. The virtual library includes: 1) Brazilian Books which makes freely available re-editions of books already published by Brazilian authors or residents, in Portuguese as well as other languages, with 220 titles. 2) The Information Society Library, with more than 30.000 academic texts about the information society. 3) SciELO Social Sciences English Edition, in partnerships with SciELO contains 30 journals from Brazil and other Latin American countries translated into English. 4) Plataforma Democrática Virtual Library with 15.000 academic texts on democracy in Latin America.

Democratic Platform

Plataforma Democrática is a joint initiative of the Edelstein Center and the Instituto Fernando Henrique Cardoso devoted to strengthening Latin American democratic institutions and culture by fostering pluralistic debate on the social and political transformations of the region and the world. Plataforma Democrática includes 21 associated institutions in Latin America. Its current areas of research and policy papers are: a) Global Geopolitical Transformations and Latina America Democracies; and b) Media and Democracy.

Plataforma Democrática site's includes a virtual library of free access with 15.000 academic titles, more than hundred original papers and the book series The State of Democracy in Latin America.

Other activities

The Edelstein Center did participated in the Secretariat of the Latin American Initiative on Drugs and Democracy. and of the Global Commission on Drug Policy.

== Select Publications ==
Books & e-Books

- SORJ, Bernardo (comp.). Democracia y Medios de Comunicación. Más allá del Estado y el Mercado. Buenos Aires: Catálogos S.L.R, 2012. ISBN 9789508953124
- SORJ, Bernardo FAUSTO, Sergio (comps.). América Latina: Transformaciones geopolíticas y democracia. Buenos Aires: Siglo XXI, 2011. ISBN 9789871013944
- SORJ, Bernardo FAUSTO, Sergio (comps.). Brasil y América del Sur: Miradas Cruzadas. Buenos Aires: Catálogos S.L.R., 2011. ISBN 9789508953063
- O'DONNELL, Guillermo. Democracia, agência e Estado. Teoria com intenção comparativa. Rio de Janeiro: Paz e Terra, 2011. ISBN 9788577531455
- SERBIN, Andrés. Chávez, Venezuela y la reconfiguración política de América Latina y el Caribe. Buenos Aires: Siglo XXI Editora Iberoamericana, 2011. ISBN 9789871013913
- FAUSTO, Sérgio (comp.). Difícil democracia. Buenos Aires: Siglo XXI, 2010. ISBN 9789871013869
- HILB, Claudia. Silêncio, Cuba: a esquerda democrática diante do regime da Revolução Cubana. São Paulo: Paz e Terra, 2010. ISBN 9788577531318
- PÉCAUT, Daniel. As FARC: uma guerrilha sem fins? São Paulo: Paz e Terra, 2010. ISBN 9788577531288
- SORJ, B. (comp.). Poder político y medios de comunicación - De la representación política al reality show. Buenos Aires: Siglo XXI, 2010. ISBN 9789871013807
- SORJ, B. (org.). Usos, abusos y desafíos de la sociedad civil en América Latina. Buenos Aires: Siglo XX, 2010. ISBN 9789871013777
- SORJ, Bernardo MARTUCCELLI, Danilo. The Latin American Challenge: Social Cohesion and Democracy. São Paulo: Instituto Fernando Henrique Cardoso / Rio de Janeiro: The Edelstein Center for Social Research, 2008. ISBN 9788599662588
- SORJ, Bernardo. Information Societies and Digital Divides: an Introduction. Milano: Polimetrica. Rio de Janeiro: The Edelstein Center for Social Research, 2008. ISBN 9788876991288
- SORJ, Bernardo. Latin America's Elusive Democracies. Rio de Janeiro: The Edelstein Center for Social Research, E-book Series 2, 2007. ISBN 9788599662229
- SORJ, Bernardo OLIVEIRA, Miguel Darcy (Ed). Sociedad Civil y Democracia en América Latina: crisis y reinvención de la política. Rio de Janeiro: Centro Edelstein de Investigaciones Sociales São Paulo: iFHC, 2007. ISBN 9788599662205
- REMOLD, Julie. Educational Technologies and Social Inequality in Brazilian Public Schools. Rio de Janeiro: The Edelstein Center for Social Research, Série E-book 1, 2006. ISBN 8599662198

Working Papers

- SORJ, Bernardo; LISSOVSKY, Mauricio. Internet in Brazilian Public Schools: Policies beyond Politics. Rio de Janeiro: The Edelstein Center for Social Research, Working Paper 6, May 2011. ISBN 9788579820533
- MILANI, Carlos R. S.; LANIADO, Ruthy Nadia. Transnational Social Movements and the Globalisation Agenda: a Methodological Approach Based on the Analysis of the World Social Forum. Rio de Janeiro: The Edelstein Center for Social Research, Working Paper 5, 2006. ISBN 8599662139
- RIBEIRO, Gustavo Lins. Other Globalizations: Alter-Native Transnational Processes and Agents. Rio de Janeiro: The Edelstein Center for Social Research, Working Paper 4, 2006. ISBN 8599662120
- WILKINSON, John. Fair Trade Moves Centre Stage. Rio de Janeiro: The Edelstein Center for Social Research, Working Paper 3, 2006. ISBN 859966218X
- SORJ, Bernardo. Internet, Public Sphere and Political Marketing: Between the Promotion of Communication and Moralist Solipsism. Rio de Janeiro: The Edelstein Center for Social Research, Working Paper 2, 2006. ISBN 8599662090
- SORJ, Bernardo. Civil Societies North-South Relations: NGOs and Dependency. Rio de Janeiro: The Edelstein Center for Social Research, Working Paper 1, 2005. ISBN 8599662023

Internet Research Resources

- Zina Angelica Caceres Benavides. Report 2: Civil Society and Fair Trade. September, 2006. ISBN 8599662112
- Dayse Marie Oliveira. Report 1: Civil Society and NGOs. November 2005. ISBN 8599662015
