= Sorj =

Sorj is a given name and a surname. Notable people with the name include:

- Bernardo Sorj (born 1948), Brazilian social scientist
- Bila Sorj (born 1950), Brazilian academic
- Sorj Chalandon (born 1952), French writer and journalist
