= El Salvador–Haiti relations =

- El Salvador: Haiti

El Salvador and Haiti maintain bilateral relations with each other. Neither country maintains a diplomatic consulate in either of their capitals, but the Salvadoran embassy in Santo Domingo and the Dominican embassy in San Salvador is accredited to Haiti, with the Haitian embassy in Santo Domingo and the Dominican embassy in Port-au-Prince is accredited to El Salvador.

== Military and humanitarian actions ==
On October 30, 2024, El Salvadoran Legislative Assembly approved a proposal to send a contingent of soldiers to Haiti under the auspices of the United Nations to handle medical evacuations. Patricia Aguilera, legal affairs director for the El Salvadoran Foreign Affairs Ministry, told the Legislative Assembly it was part of the country’s commitment to the U.N.’s Multinational Security Support Mission in Haiti, the predecessor to the Gang Suppression Force. On 4 and 5 January 2025, the Armed Forces of El Salvador sent 150 troops along with the Guatemalan Armed Forces to combat Haiti's escalating gang war and its worsening crisis.

On October 18, 2026, armed gang members ambushed Salvadoran Air Force personnel serving with Haiti's Gang Suppression Force in Port-au-Prince, using gunfire and explosives, with four Salvadoran service members remaining missing after escaping their burning armored vehicle. El Salvador announced deploying thousands of soldiers in a rescue operation, which occurred with the deploying of 2,000 troops on October 29.

== See also ==
- El Salvador–United States relations
- Haiti–United States relations
