= 2026 Croix-des-Bouquets kidnapping =

2026 gang ambush in Haiti

- Part of the Haitian conflict and the prelude to the Salvadoran military intervention in Haiti
- 2026 Croix-des-Bouquets kidnapping (Haiti)
- Location: Croix-des-Bouquets, Haiti
- Date: 18 October 2026
- Target: Salvadoran technicians
- Attack type: Kidnapping
- Victims: 4 technicians missing
- Perpetrator: Haitian gang members
- Motive: Unknown

On 18 October 2026, Haitian gang members ambushed an armored vehicle carrying four Salvadoran aviation technicians of the Gang Suppression Force (GSF) in the Haitian commune of Croix-des-Bouquets in the Ouest Department. The technicians attempted to flee but were kidnapped and taken hostage by the gang members. No group has claimed responsibility for the ambush nor has officially been identified as being responsible.

On 20 October, the GSF and the Haitian National Police launched a helicopter offensive that killed several gang members while attempting to locate the technicians. On 21 October, Salvadoran president Nayib Bukele announced the beginning of a military operation to rescue the technicians, stating that they had been kidnapped by Haitian gang members. He threatened to "finish" the gangs if the technicians were not returned alive. By 28 October, El Salvador had 2,000 soldiers in Haiti.

GSF and non-governmental organization representatives believe that gang members committed the kidnapping to force the GSF and Haitian authorities to negotiate with the gangs, pressure a GSF withdrawal, and assert their authority. Haitian gang leaders have stated that they intend to stand their ground.

== Background ==
The first Salvadoran soldiers to arrive in Haiti on 3 January 2025.

On 30 October 2024, the Legislative Assembly of El Salvador approved a decree that authorized the deployment of Salvadoran military personnel to Haiti until October 2026 to support the United Nations-organized Multinational Security Support Mission—later known as the Gang Suppression Force (GSF)—with medical evacuations. In January 2025, El Salvador deployed eight Salvadoran Air Force personnel to Haiti, and in February 2025, it deployed a further 70 soldiers. On 29 September 2026, the Legislative Assembly extended El Salvador's involvement in the GSF until October 2027. By then, El Salvador had at least 124 personnel in Haiti supporting the GSF.

== Ambush ==
On 18 October 2026, four Salvadoran aviation technicians attached to the GSF visited a market in Croix-des-Bouquets, a commune in the Ouest Department near the Haitian capital Port-au-Prince. The market they visited was located in a "red zone" controlled by gangs. According to Diego Da Rin, an analyst for the International Crisis Group, the technicians did not travel with a security detail sufficient to enter such an area. El Diario de Hoy identified 23-year-old Edimar Rosales as one of the technicians.

While the technicians were returning to base, Haitian gang members attacked the armored vehicle in which the technicians were traveling with explosives, setting it on fire. The attack occurred in the village of Santo in territory controlled by the Chèn Méchan gang and near territory controlled by the 400 Mawozo gang. The Armed Forces of El Salvador (FAES) reported that the four technicians fled the vehicle, but at some point later, gang members kidnapped the four technicians and took them hostage. Some Haitian news outlets reported that Chèn Méchan was holding the technicians hostage, but no group has been officially identified as being responsible for the ambush nor has any group claimed responsibility.

== Search and rescue operations ==
Salvadoran soldiers arriving in Haiti on 29 October

During a United Nations Security Council meeting regarding Haiti, Mike Waltz, the United States ambassador to the United Nations, condemned the attack and stated that the technicians would be rescued. He also addressed the gangs, saying that the attack would not coerce the GSF into withdrawing from Haiti. Egriselda López, the Salvadoran ambassador to the UN, condemned the ambush and called for an international operation to locate and rescue the four missing technicians.

On 19 October, the FAES reported that a helicopter sent to search the area where the technicians went missing was shot at. The GSF and the Haitian National Police (PNH) later conducted a helicopter offensive against gangs in Plaine du Cul-de-Sac near where the technicians disappeared. The offensive killed several gang members, with unofficial sources claiming that at least 18 were killed and 13 more were injured. A further four GSF personnel were injured. Vectus Global, a private security company founded by Blackwater founder Erik Prince, participated in the operations as a part of the PNH task force.

On 21 October, Bukele wrote on X that gang members were holding the technicians as hostages and announced the beginning of a military operation to rescue them. In Bukele's X post, he wrote that the mission's sole goal was to rescue the four technicians but threatened the gangs that if the technicians were not rescued alive, he would "finish" them. In a statement, the Haitian prime minister Alix Didier Fils-Aimé announced that the Haitian government intends to assert its authority over armed groups and that the release of the technicians was an "absolute priority". On 22 October, The Wall Street Journal reported that El Salvador had deployed 100 special forces soldiers to Haiti to assist in the search and rescue operation. On 28 October, the Salvadoran government stated that it had 2,000 soldiers in Haiti.

== Status of the technicians ==
On 24 October, The New York Times reported that the GSF had recovered burned bodies and were working to positively identify if they were those of the kidnapped technicians. Bukele later stated that the bodies were not those of the technicians. On 2 November, the PNH recovered the destroyed armored vehicle that carried the four technicians.

On 25 October, Wilson Joseph, the leader of 400 Mawozo, released a video addressed to Bukele claiming that the four technicians were killed by Chèn Méchan due to "an error". He claimed that Chèn Méchan shot at the technicians' vehicle when it left 400 Mawozo territory and entered Chèn Méchan territory. Joseph denied involvement in the attack and stated that "I would have taken them [the technicians] alive" to use them as a bargaining chip in negotiations.

== Reactions ==
=== In Haiti ===
On 21 October, Krisla, a gang leader, published a video acknowledging that the GSF has "bigger weapons and more technology" than the gangs but that "we'll fight to the end". He added that "we didn't ask Bukele to come here, and we didn't ask Bukele to send soldiers here. Bukele has come here to protect his money at his soldiers' expense." On 23 October, Joseph posted a video showing off ammunition and stated that he would wait for the Salvadorans to arrive and that he would not flee the country.

=== In El Salvador ===
Bukele responded to criticism of the search and rescue operation on X by affirming his confidence that the gangs would be defeated and that God would grant the Salvadorans victory. According to an opinion poll conducted by CID Gallup from 24 to 27 October, 86 percent of Salvadorans approved of the rescue mission in Haiti, but 82 percent also worried about the risks that Salvadoran personnel faced while carrying out the mission. Additionally, 51 percent had high confidence that the technicians would be rescued alive.

After the ambush, Rafael Aguirre, the Farabundo Martí National Liberation Front's presidential candidate in El Salvador's 2027 presidential election, called on the Salvadoran government to withdraw military personnel from Haiti. According to the newspaper El Mundo, Aguirre did not specify if he only referred to withdrawing the four personnel affected or withdrawing El Salvador's entire military contingent attached to the GSF.

=== International ===
The United Nations System condemned the ambush and called for the four technicians' "immediate and safe return". Albert Ramdin, the secretary general of the Organization of American States, expressed solidarity with El Salvador and wrote on X that he hoped the technicians would be rescued.

== Analysis ==
Jack Christofides, a special representative of the GSF, told the UN on 19 October that the gangs were "testing" the GSF, citing that attacks against the GSF had recently increased. He added that gangs had previously carried out reprisal killings following operations by the GSF and PNH. Romain Le Cour, the leader of the Haiti Observatory at the Global Initiative Against Transnational Organized Crime, stated that a gang may have attacked the technicians and taken them hostage to "gain [an] edge to negotiate and to pressure the security forces" and to "show that they can strike back" against the GSF. Da Rin similarly theorized that the technicians were being held hostage to serve as a negotiation tool, stating that he does not believe the kidnapping was to gain money but was instead to "compel the authorities to enter into negotiations" and "prevent incursions into their territory".

== See also ==
- Haitian crisis (2018–present)
