= Ian Goldin =

South African-born British professor director of the Oxford Martin School

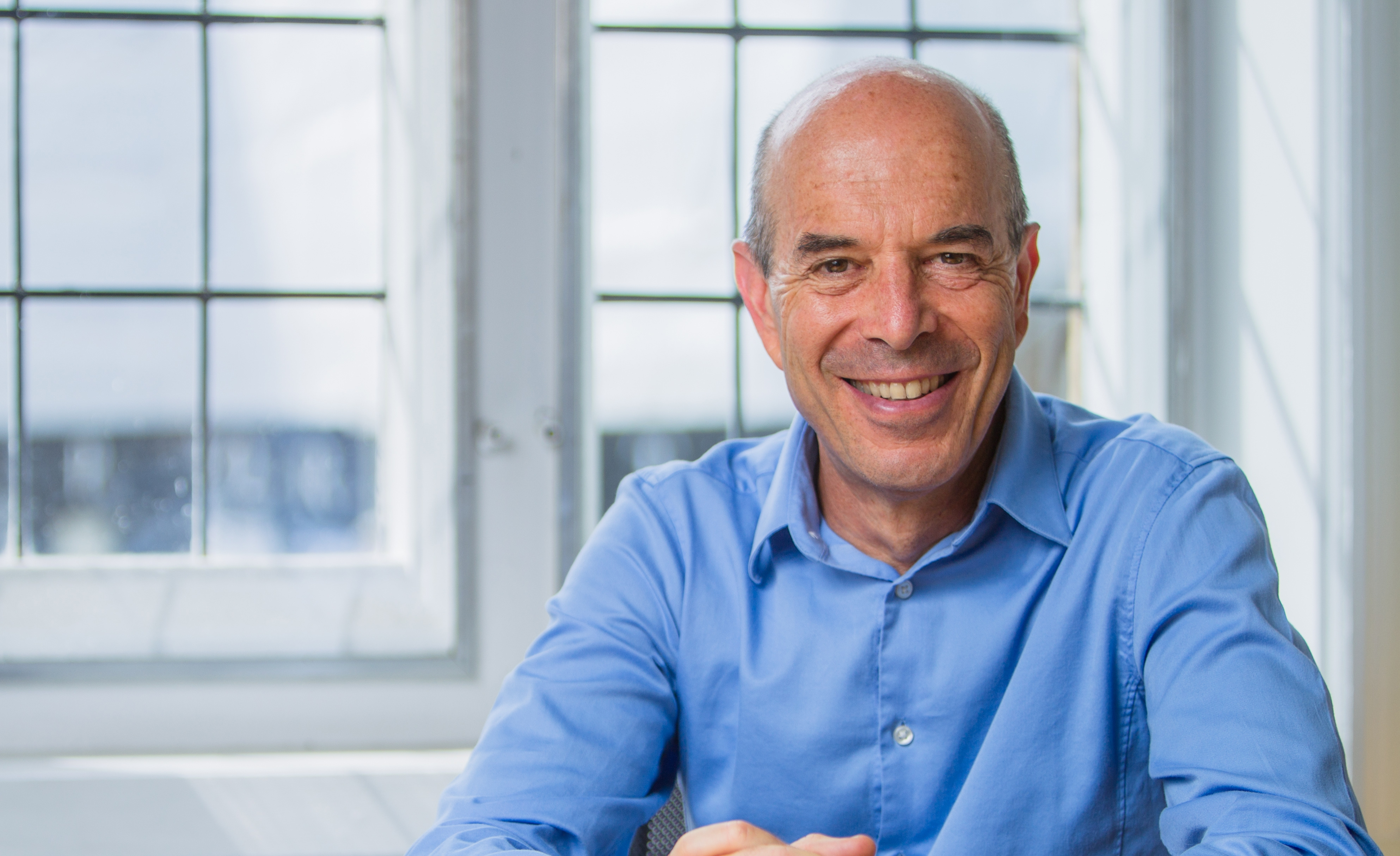
- Goldin in 2019
- Born: Ian Andrew Goldin; March 3, 1955 (age 71); Pretoria, South Africa
- Education: Pretoria Boys High School; Rondebosch Boys' High School; University of Cape Town (BSc, BA); London School of Economics (MSc); University of Oxford (DPhil, MA); INSEAD (AMP)
- Known for: Oxford Martin School
- Spouse: Theresa Webber (m. 1992)
- Awards: Ordre national du Mérite (2000)
- Scientific career
- Fields: Globalization; Development studies
- Workplaces: University of Oxford; European Bank for Reconstruction and Development; World Bank; OECD; Development Bank of Southern Africa
- Thesis: Coloured preference policies and the making of coloured political identity in the Western Cape region of South Africa, with particular reference to the period 1948 to 1984 (1984)
- Website: iangoldin.org

Ian Andrew Goldin (born 1955) is a South African-born British professor at the University of Oxford in England, and was the founding director of the Oxford Martin School.

Goldin is currently the director of the Oxford Martin Research Programmes on Technological and Economic Change, Future of Work and Future of Development. He is also Professor of globalisation and development and holds a professorial fellowship at Balliol College, Oxford.

== Education ==
Goldin was educated at Pretoria Boys High School and Rondebosch Boys' High School in Cape Town. He subsequently obtained Bachelor of Arts and Bachelor of Science degrees from the University of Cape Town, a Master of Science from the London School of Economics, and a Master of Arts and Doctor of Philosophy from the University of Oxford. In 1999 he completed INSEAD's Advanced Management Program (AMP). He has been a visiting fellow at the Centre for Advanced Study in the Behavioral Sciences (CASBS) at Stanford University since 2025 and the Stellenbosch Institute for Advanced Study (STIAS) since 2017 .

== Career and research ==
Prior to 1996 Goldin was principal economist at the European Bank for Reconstruction and Development (EBRD) in London, and program director at the OECD in Paris, where he directed the Development Centre's Programs on Trade, Environment and Sustainable Development.

From 1996 to 2001, Goldin was chief executive and managing director of the Development Bank of Southern Africa (DBSA) and served as an adviser to President Nelson Mandela. He transitioned the Bank from an apartheid-era institution to a major agent for development in the 14 countries of Southern Africa. During this period, Goldin was finance director for South Africa's Olympic Games bid.

Goldin was director of development policy at the World Bank (2001–2003) and then vice president of the World Bank (2003–2006). He served on the Bank's senior management team, and was directly responsible for its relationship with the UK and all other European, North American and developed countries. Goldin led the Bank's collaboration with the United Nations and other partners. As Director of Development Policy, Goldin worked on the research and strategy agenda of the Bank, with the Chief Economist, Lord Nicholas Stern, under the leadership of James Wolfensohn. During this period, Goldin was special representative at the United Nations and served on the chief executive board of the UN and the UN Reform Task Force.

In 2006, Goldin became founding director of the Oxford Martin School. Under his leadership the school established 45 programmes of research, with over 500 academics from over 100 disciplines tackling a wide range of global challenges. Among the many groups that Goldin established in the Oxford Martin School are the Institute for New Economic Thinking, Future of Humanity Institute and Institute of Ageing, as well as programmes tackling climate change, cancer and nano and quantum technologies. Goldin remained the School's director until September 2016 when Achim Steiner followed him in this position. He is now Director of three research programmes at the department: Technological and Economic Change, Future of Work and Future of Development.

Goldin initiated and was vice-chair of the Oxford Martin Commission for Future Generations, which brought together international leaders from government, business, academia, media and civil society to discuss a long-term perspective in international negotiations. Chaired by Pascal Lamy, the Commission published its findings in October 2013.

Goldin has been a distinguished visiting professor at Sciences Po, Paris and served on the advisory committee of ETH Zurich and the Institute for Sustainable Development and International Relations, Paris. He is an honorary trustee of Comic Relief and is the founding chair of the trustees of the Core-Econ initiative to reform the economics curriculum and the teaching of economics.. He is a founding trustee of the Centre for Future Generations (CFG), a Brussels based think tank dedicated to ensuring that decision-makers understand emerging technologies and that these are harnessed to best serve the interests of humanity. He is the writer and presenter of the BBC series 'After the Crash', 'The Pandemic that Changed the World', and documentary: 'Will AI Kill Development?', as well as the BBC Analysis 'the Death of Globalisation?'

Goldin is the author of 25 books and over 60 journal articles. His most recent books are Terra Incognita: 100 Maps to Survive the Next 100 Years, The Shortest History of Migration, and Age of the City.

Goldin's book on human migration was published in 2024. His article on Why is Productivity Slowing Down? was published in the Journal of Economic Literature in March 2024.

=== Awards ===
Goldin has been awarded:

- France: "Chevalier de l'Ordre national du Mérite", for Services to Development, 2000.
- National Productivity Institute: Gold Award. (Awarded for Management, 1999).
- World Economic Forum: Global Leader for Tomorrow. (Achievements in Development, 1998).
- Honorary Doctorate from the National School of Political and Administrative Studies SNSPA in Bucharest, Romania.

=== Publications ===
Goldin has published 25 books and over 60 articles, including:

- The Shortest History of Migration
- Why is Productivity Slowing Down?, Journal of Economic Literature, 2024
- Age of the City: Why our Future will be Won or Lost Together
- Rescue: From Global Crisis to a Better World
- "Terra Incognita: 100 Maps to Survive the Next 100 Years", with Robert Muggah,
- The Productivity Paradox: Reconciling Rapid Technological Change and Stagnating Productivity Oxford Martin Programme on Technological and Economic Change, 2019
- "Migration and the Economy: Economic Realities, Social Impacts and Political Choices", Citi GPS: Global Perspectives and Solutions, 2018
- Development: A Very Short Introduction
- "Age of Discovery: Navigating the Storms of Our New Renaissance", with Chris Kutarna,
- "The Pursuit of Development: Economic Growth, Social Change and Ideas",
- "The Butterfly Defect: How globalization creates systemic risk and what to do about it", Princeton University Press, 2014
- Is the Planet Full?
- Divided Nations: Why global governance is failing and what we can do about it
- "Globalization for Development: Meeting New Challenges", (with Kenneth Reinert), Oxford University Press, 2012
- "Exceptional People: How Migration Shaped Our World and Will Define Our Future", (with Geoffrey Cameron and Meera Balarajan), Princeton University Press, 2011.
- "Globalization for Development: Trade, Finance, Aid, Migration, and Policy", (with Kenneth Reinert), World Bank and Palgrave Macmillan, Washington and Basingstoke, 2006, reprinted in 2007.
- The Case For Aid, (with Nicholas Stern and F. Halsey Rogers), World Bank, Washington, 2002
- The Economics of Sustainable Development
- Global Governance and Systemic Risk in the 21st Century
- Globalisation and Risks for Business, 360 Risk Insight Report, Lloyds, London, 2010.

== Personal life ==
Goldin married Theresa Webber in 1992 and has one son and one daughter.
