= Robert Muggah =

- Born: July 20, 1974 (age 52); Toronto, Ontario, Canada
- Occupation: Research Director at the Igarapé Institute
- Known for: Co-founder of the Igarapé Institute and The SecDev Group

Robert Muggah is a political scientist, urbanist, and security expert. He is the co-founder of the Igarapé Institute and the SecDev Group, where he is known for his work on urbanization, crime prevention, arms control, migration, cyber-security, the digital economy, conflict and development studies. He regularly advises national and city governments, management consulting and technology firms, United Nations agencies, and the World Bank.

His work on designing interactive platforms to map arms transfers, track homicide, predict crime, and promote police accountability is globally recognized. He was listed as one of the top 100 most important people in violence prevention and is the recipient of numerous honors, including the Lewis Perinbam Award for outstanding humanitarian service and the Lind Fellowship in 2018. One of his organizations, the Igarapé Institute, was ranked the world's top social policy think tank in 2019 by Prospect Magazine.

== Career ==
He is the co-chair of the advisory committee of the Global Parliament of Mayors and the Know Violence in Childhood Network He was nominated by the UN Secretary General to advise a panel on Youth, Peace and Security and is a fellow with the Global Initiative Against Transnational Organized Crime, the Chicago Council on Global Affairs, the Canadian Global Affairs Institute, and the Global Council for the Future of Cities and Urbanization and the Global Risk Report of the World Economic Forum.

He graduated with BA Honors from the University of King's College and Dalhousie University in 1997. He received an MPhil from the Institute for Development Studies at the University of Sussex in 1999. In 2008 earned a Doctorate of Philosophy (DPhil) from the University of Oxford where he was recipient of a grant from the Social Science Research Council. He has taught courses at the Graduate Institute of International and Development Studies in Geneva, at the University of San Diego, the University of British Columbia, and the International Relations Department of the Pontifical Catholic University of Rio de Janeiro. He is non-resident faculty at Princeton University. Singularity University in California

== Personal life ==
Muggah is married to Ilona Szabó de Carvalho, co-founder of Instituto Igarapé.

== Publications, interviews, and lectures ==
Muggah is the author or editor of eight books. Terra Incognita: 100 Maps to Survive the Next 100 Years, is co-authored with Ian Goldin and published by Penguin/Random House.

His research on organized crime, the future of cities, climate resilience and the impacts of COVID-19 has been featured by multiple news outlets

== See also ==
- Igarapé Institute
