= Igarapé Institute =

Brazilian think tank

- Logo of the Igarapé Institute.
- Formation: 2011
- Headquarters: Rio de Janeiro
- Location: Brazil
- Region served: Global
- Official language: Portuguese, English
- Research Director: Robert Muggah
- Executive Director: Ilona Szabó de Carvalho
- Website: igarape.org.br/en/

The Igarapé Institute or Instituto Igarapé is a Brazilian-based think tank that focuses on emerging security and development issues. The Institute's stated approach emphasizes research, informed debate, and the development of people centred tailor-made solutions. The views of Igarapé staff have been cited and referenced in news stories in the Brazilian and international press in connection with urban violence and policing internationally and Brazil in particular.

The Igarapé Institute is headquartered in Rio de Janeiro, Brazil, with personnel in São Paulo, Brasília, Bogota and Mexico City.

== Areas of work ==
The institute currently has five main programs focused on:

- Citizen security
- Cyber security
- Global and national drug policy (ex: Pernambuco Cooperation with the UN)
- International cooperation and assistance.
- Sustainable development

The Igarapé Institute has been involved in a number of innovative projects such as an interactive visual history of the global arms trade and using smart phones to increase police accountability.

== History ==
The Igarapé Institute was formed in 2011 as an independent and non-partisan think and do tank in Brazil. The Institute is devoted to raising attention to the challenges of violence and insecurity across Brazil and Latin America. It works with other Brazilian organizations such as Conectas and Sou da Paz as well as international organizations such as the United Nations and the Inter-American Development Bank to encourage changes in government policy.

The Institute also coordinates a network of young Brazilian leaders called Pense Livre to promote changes in national drug policy. The Institute is a partner of the Drug Policy Alliance and Google Ideas.

== Awards ==
The Igarapé Institute has been awarded several international prizes for its use of new technologies to prevent violence and promote transparency. In 2018, it was voted Top Human Rights NGO in Brazil by Instituto Doar, and "Think Tank to Watch" by Prospect magazine. In 2014, the Institute was one of two Latin American organizations to win a New Digital Age grants from Google Executive Chairman Eric Schmidt. Also in 2014, the Institute was singled out for a Networked Society award, promoted by Ericsson, and a Google Impacts award for its work on new technology and child protection. In 2012, the Institute received a Favorite Website Award.

The Igarapé Institute's executive director, Ilona Szabó de Carvalho and its research director, Robert Muggah, spoke at TED Global on fragile cities, resilient cities, and lessons for advocacy and campaigning. Also, in 2014, Robert Muggah delivered a keynote talk on cyber cartels at the Web Summit. Igarapé Institute's research on cities and citizen security is also widely recognized.

In the scope of global drug policy, Ilona Szabó de Carvalho coordinated the Americas Office of the Global Commission on Drug Policy and was the executive coordinator of the Commission's secretariat between 2011 and 2016.
