= Bernardo Sorj =

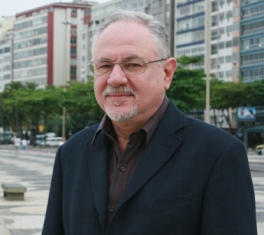
- Born: 26 September 1948; Montevideo, Uruguay

Bernardo Sorj (born September 1948, Montevideo, Uruguay) is a Brazilian social scientist, retired professor of Sociology at the Federal University of Rio de Janeiro. He is Director of The Edelstein Center for Social Research and of the Plataforma Democrática Project. He has published 30 books in several languages and more than 100 articles, on Latin American political development, international relations, the social impact of new technologies, social theory and Judaism.

== Biography ==
Sorj begun his studies in Social Sciences in Uruguay and completed his B.A. and M.A. in History and Sociology from the University of Haifa, Israel, and received his Ph.D. in Sociology from the University of Manchester in England.

He is a naturalized Brazilian, living in Brazil since 1976. He was professor at the Department of Political Science at the Federal University of Minas Gerais and at the Institute for International Relations - Pontifical Catholic University of Rio de Janeiro and visiting professor and chair at many European, Latin American and North American universities, including the Chaire Sérgio Buarque de Hollanda, at the Fondation Maison des sciences de l’homme, in Paris, and the Cátedra Simón Bolívar of the Institut des hautes études d'Amérique Latine - University of Paris III: Sorbonne Nouvelle.

He is a member of the board of several academic journals, advisor to scientific institutions and consultant to international organizations. He has been a visiting associate fellow at several research centers, including the Institute of Advanced Studies - University of Sao Paulo, Annemberg School University of South California, Brookings Institution and the Transatlantic Academy.

He is currently director of the Edelstein Center for Social Research and director of the Democratic Platform project at the FHC Foundation. Bernardo Sorj is the editor of the Journal of Democracy in Portuguese and Conexão América Latina.

In 2005 he was elected Brazil's Man of Ideas. In 2021 and 2023 his books In which world we live in? and Identities and the crisis of democracies were finalists for the Jabuti prize.

== Personal life ==
In 1970, Sorj married Bila Grin, a fellow Latin American-Jewish student at the University of Haifa. They had one son, Pablo.

== Books ==
2024

SORJ, B., Geopolítica e História do Povo Judeu, Rio de Janeiro, Editora Garamond. ISBN 978-65-5937-053-5

SORJ, B., FAUSTO, S, (org.), Nacionalismo e Democracia na Europa e no Brasil, São Paulo, Editora FFHC. ISBN 978-65-87503-44-8

SORJ, B., FAUSTO, S, (org.), Desafios do Sistema Político Brasileiro, São Paulo, Editora FFHC, ISBN 978-65-87503-40-0

2022

- SORJ, B. Identidades e crises das democracias São Paulo: Plataforma Democrática. ISBN 978-65-87503-15-8
- SORJ, B. Religião, democracia e educação no Brasil São Paulo: Plataforma Democrática. ISBN 978-65-87503-14-1
- SORJ, B. Religião e democracia na Europa e no Brasil São Paulo: Plataforma Democrática. ISBN 978-65-87503-21-9

2020

- SORJ, B. Em que mundo vivemos? São Paulo: Plataforma Democrática. ISBN 978-65-87503-00-4
- SORJ, B. ¿En qué mundo vivimos? São Paulo: Plataforma Democrática. ISBN 978-65-87503-01-1
- SORJ, B. What world is this we are living in? São Paulo: Plataforma Democrática. ISBN 978-65-87503-04-2
- SORJ, B. Corações e Mentes: fora e dentro da Internet. São Paulo: Plataforma Democrática. ISBN 978-65-87503-05-9

2018

- SORJ, B. et al., Sobrevivendo nas Redes - Guia do Cidadão. São Paulo: Editora Moderna.

2016

- SORJ, B.; FAUSTO, S. Activismo político en tiempos de Internet. São Paulo: Plataforma Democrática.

2015

- SORJ, B., TONELLO, G., VINTIMILLA, E., BELLETTINI, O., TORO, B., Sociedad, organizaciones y Estado: reflexiones y experiencias para un debate necesario. Quito: Grupo Faro.
- SORJ, B., FAUSTO, S., Internet y Transformaciones Sociales: Transformaciones del Espacio Público y de la Sociedad Civil. San Pablo: Plataforma Democrática.
- SORJ, B., FAUSTO, S., Internet e Mobilizações Sociais: Transformações do Espaço Público e da Sociedade Civil. São Paulo: Plataforma Democrática.

2014

- SORJ, B., MARTUCCELLI, O. O dilema Latino-americano (in Ukrainian ). Kiev: Calvaria.

2013

- SORJ, B.; FAUSTO, S. (Orgs.). O Brasil e a Governança da América Latina. Que tipo de liderança é possível?. São Paulo. Plataforma Democrática.
- SORJ, B., FAUSTO, S. (orgs.), Brasil y América Latina: ¿Qué Liderazgo es Posible?. São Paulo: Plataforma Democrática.

2012

- SORJ, B. Vai embora da casa de teus pais . Rio de Janeiro: Civilização Brasileira.
- SORJ, B. (Ed.). Democracia y medios de comunicación. Más allá del Estado y el Mercado. Buenos Aires: Catálogos S.L.R.

2011

- SORJ, B.; FAUSTO, S. (Orgs.) Brasil e América do Sul: Olhares cruzados. Rio de Janeiro: Plataforma Democrática.
- SORJ, B. (Org.) Meios de comunicação e democracia: Além do Estado e do Mercado. Rio de Janeiro: Plataforma Democrática.
- SORJ, B.; FAUSTO, S. (Eds.). América Latina: Transformaciones geopolíticas y democracia . Buenos Aires: Siglo XXI.
- SORJ, B.; FAUSTO, S. (Eds.). Brasil y América del Sur: Miradas cruzadas. Buenos Aires: Catálogos S.L.R.

2010

- SORJ, B. Judaism for Everyone...without Dogma. Washington, D.C.: IFSHJ.
- SORJ, B. (comp.). Poder político y medios de comunicación - De la representación política al reality show. Buenos Aires: Siglo XXI.
- SORJ, B. (org.). Poder político e meios de comunicação: da representação política ao reality show. São Paulo: Paz e Terra.
- SORJ, B. Judaísmo para todos. Rio de Janeiro: Civilização Brasileira.
- SORJ, B. Judaísmo para todos. Lisboa: Edições Cotovia.
- SORJ, B. (org.) Usos, abusos y desafíos de la sociedad civil en América Latina. Buenos Aires: Siglo XXI.
- SORJ, B. (org.). Usos, abusos e desafios da sociedade civil na América Latina. São Paulo: Paz e Terra.

2009

- SORJ, B. Judaísmo para todos. Buenos Aires: Siglo XXI. Republished by The Edelstein Center for Social Research at 2011.

2008

- SORJ, B. Information Societies and Digital Divides: an Introduction. Milano: Polimetrica
- SORJ, B; MARTUCCELLI, D. The Latin American Challenge: Social Cohesion and Democracy. São Paulo: Instituto Fernando Henrique Cardoso/ Rio de Janeiro: The Edelstein Center for Social Research
- SORJ, B; MARTUCCELLI, D. El Desafío Latinoamericano: cohesión social y democracia. Buenos Aires: Siglo XXI.
- SORJ, B; MARTUCCELLI, D. O desafio latino-americano: coesão social e democracia. Rio de Janeiro: Civilização Brasileira.

2007

- SORJ, B. Latin America’s Elusive Democracies. Rio de Janeiro: The Edelstein Center for Social Research, E-book Series 2..
- SORJ, B.; OLIVEIRA, M. D. (Eds.). Sociedad Civil y Democracia en América Latina: crisis y reinvención de la política. Rio de Janeiro: Ediciones Centro Edelstein; São Paulo: Ediciones iFHC. ISBN 978-85-99662-20-5
- SORJ, B; OLIVEIRA, M. D. (Eds.). Sociedade Civil e Democracia na América Latina: crise e reinvenção da política. Rio de Janeiro: Ediciones Centro Edelstein / São Paulo: Instituto Fernando Henrique Cardoso

2006

- SORJ, B., BONDER, N. Judaísmo para el Siglo XXI - El Rabino y el Sociólogo. Buenos Aires. Lilmod. ISBN 987-22628-7-X. Republished by The Edelstein Center for Social Research at 2008.

2005

- SORJ, B., La democracia inesperada. Preface by Guillermo O'Donnell. Buenos Aires: Bononiae University Press/Prometeo Libros. ISBN 987-21802-1-0. Republished by The Edelstein Center for Social Research at 2008.
- SORJ, B., GUEDES, L.E., Internet na favela. Rio de Janeiro: Unesco - Editora Gramma. ISBN 85-98555-03-7
- SORJ, B., GUEDES, L.E., Internet y pobreza. Montevideo: Editora Unesco - Ediciones Trilce. ISBN 9974-32-407-6

2004

- SORJ, B., A Democracia Inesperada: cidadania, direitos humanos e desigualdade social. Rio de Janeiro, Jorge Zahar. ISBN 85-7110-806-4

2003

- SORJ, B., brazil@digitaldivide.com. - Confronting inequality in the Information Society. UNESCO. ISBN 85-87853-91-0
- SORJ, B., brasil@povo.com - A Luta contra a Desigualdade na Sociedade da Informação. Rio de Janeiro, Jorge Zahar.

2001

- SORJ, B., BONDER, N., Judaísmo para o Século XXI: o rabino e o sociólogo. Rio de Janeiro, Jorge Zahar. Republished by The Edelstein Center for Social Research at 2010.
- SORJ, B., A Construção Intelectual do Brasil Contemporâneo. Da resistência à ditadura ao governo FHC. Rio de Janeiro, Jorge Zahar.

2000

- SORJ, B., A nova sociedade brasileira. Rio de Janeiro, Jorge Zahar (2nd. edition, 2001; 3rd edition, 2006).

1993

- SORJ, B., GRIN, M., (Ed.) Judaísmo e Modernidade: metamorfoses da tradição messiânica. Rio de Janeiro, Imago. Republished by The Edelstein Center for Social Research at 2008.

1990

- SORJ, B., PECAUT, D., (Ed.) Métamorphoses de la représentation politique au Brésil et en Europe, Editions du CNRS, Paris.
- SORJ, B., (Ed.) La Biotecnología Industrial en América Latina. Rio de Janeiro, Fundação BIORIO.
- SORJ, B., GOODMAN, D., WILKINSON, J., Da Lavoura às Biotecnologias: agricultura e indústria no sistema internacional. Rio de Janeiro, Campus. Republished by The Edelstein Center for Social Research at 2008.

1989

- SORJ, B., CANTLEY, M., SIMPSON, K., (Eds.) Biotechnology in Europe and Latin America: Prospects for co-operation, Kluwer, Dordrecht. Republished by The Edelstein Center for Social Research at 2010.

1987

- SORJ, B., GOODMAN, D., WILKINSON, J., From Farming to Biotechnology - A Theory of Agroindustrial Development. Oxford, Blackwell. ISBN 0-7923-0278-8

1985

- SORJ, B., CARDOSO, F.H., FONT, M., (Ed.) Economia e Movimentos Sociais na América Latina. São Paulo, Brasiliense. Republished by The Edelstein Center for Social Research at 2008.

1983

- SORJ, B., BOOTH, D., (Ed.) Military Reformism and Social Classes: Aspects of the Peruvian Experience, 1968/1980, MacMillan, London.
- SORJ, B., TAVARES, M.H., (Ed.) Sociedade e Política no Brasil Pós-64. São Paulo, Brasiliense (3rd. Edition). Republished by The Edelstein Center for Social Research at 2008.

1982

- SORJ, B., POMPERMAYER, M., CORADINI, L., Camponeses e Agroindústria - Transformação Social e Representação Política na Avicultura Brasileira. Rio de Janeiro, Zahar. Republished by The Edelstein Center for Social Research at 2008.

1980

- SORJ, B., Estado e classes sociais na agricultura brasileira. Rio de Janeiro: Zahar (2nd Edition, 1986). Republished by The Edelstein Center for Social Research at 2008.

1977

- SORJ, B., HENFREY, C., Chilean Voices, London, Harverster Press. Republished by The Edelstein Center for Social Research at 2008.
