= Bila Sorj =

Brazilian women's studies academic (born 1950)

- Born: Bila Grin; 1950 (age 75–76); Santo André, São Paulo, Brazil
- Occupation: Academic
- Years active: 1976–present

Bila Sorj (born 1950) is a Brazilian academic and pioneer of women's studies. Born in Brazil, she made aliyah to Israel to work communally on a kibbutz and earn her bachelor's and master's degree from the University of Haifa. Returning to Brazil in 1976, she taught sociology and began incorporating women's studies into her work at the Federal University of Minas Gerais. Completing her PhD at the University of Manchester in 1979, she began teaching at the Federal University of Rio de Janeiro in 1984. She completed post-doctorate studies at the School for Advanced Studies in the Social Sciences in Paris. Her research primarily focuses on employment and the ways that gender affects both paid and unpaid labor. She also studies Judaism. Her 2000 book, Israel terra em transe: democracia ou teocracia? (Israel Land in a Trance: Democracy or Theocracy?), was a finalist for the Prêmio Jabuti in 2001. She is the coordinator of the Núcleo de Estudos de Sexualidade e Gênero (NESEG, Nucleus for Studies on Sexuality and Gender) in the graduate program of the department of Anthropology and Sociology at the Federal University of Rio de Janeiro. She is regarded as one of the academics who opened the field of gender studies in Brazil.

== Early life and education ==
Bila Grin was born in 1950, in Santo André, São Paulo, Brazil to Margarida and Herschel Henrique Grin. Her parents were naturalized Brazilians and Jewish; her father was from Mandatory Palestine and her mother was from Lithuania. In 1969, she began her university studies at the University of São Paulo and became involved in the Zionist and socialist movements. At the time, it was common for young Zionists to travel to Israel and work on a kibbutz before they reached the age of twenty. She followed this trend, and transferred her studies in sociology and history to the University of Haifa. While there, she met Bernardo Sorj, whom she married in 1970. She graduated with an undergraduate degree from Haifa in 1972 and continued there with her schooling, earning a master's degree in sociology in 1974.

== Career ==
In 1976, the couple were each hired to work at the Federal University of Minas Gerais, in Belo Horizonte, Brazil. Bila taught sociology as an associate professor through 1982, while pursuing her PhD from the University of Manchester. She completed her thesis The Formation of Ideology Amongst Brazilian Steel Workers in 1979, under the direction of Brian Roberts. Her thesis presented a theme, which her later studies would continue, of evaluating the working class and the impact social changes had on workers. During their time in Belo Horizonte, the couple's son, Pablo was born. Bila was a founding member of SOS Violência (Violence SOS), an NGO which assisted women who were victims of domestic violence in Minas Gerais and began to incorporate gender and feminist theories in her research.

In 1984, Sorj began teaching at the Federal University of Rio de Janeiro. Her research there focused on the differences that gender imposed on work, evaluating both paid and unpaid labor. Another focus was the impact of public policies on women and families. Her pioneering work pressed for the inclusion of gender analysis in mainstream sociological debates and opened the field of gender studies in Brazil. For over a decade, she served on the Concurso de Dotações para Pesquisa sobre a Mulher e Relações de Gênero (Research Appropriations Commission on Women and Gender Relations) sponsored by the Carlos Chagas Foundation, to promote academic research into the issues women faced in Brazilian society. She was one of the founders of Revista Estudos Feministas (Feminist Studies Magazine), one of the primary Brazilian academic journals on gender, in 1992, and has served on its editorial board.

Sorj became the coordinator of the Núcleo de Estudos de Sexualidade e Gênero (NESEG, Nucleus for Studies on Sexuality and Gender) in the graduate program of the department of Anthropology and Sociology. She also completed research on Judaism in a post-doctorate study in 1995, from the École des Hautes Études en Sciences Sociales (EHESS, School for Advanced Studies in the Social Sciences), in Paris, on the migration of Russian Jews to Brazil from the time of the 1905 Russian Revolution. Along with veteran journalist Guila Flint, she wrote, Israel terra em transe: democracia ou teocracia? (Israel Land in a Trance: Democracy or Theocracy?), an analysis of Jewish fundamentalism and nationalism and its impact on tensions in the Middle East, which was a finalist in the 2001 Prêmio Jabuti competition for human sciences. She serves on the Comitê Gêneros e Sexualidades (Committee of Gender and Sexuality) of the Associação Nacional de Pós-Graduação e Pesquisa em Ciências Sociais (ANPOCS, National Association of Graduate Studies and Research in Social Sciences).

== Other research ==
In her classic work on women's studies in Brazil, Sorj and Maria Luiza Heilborn traced the origins of academic treatment of women in both the United States and Brazil. They noted that they differed, as in the US, the studies emerged from the civil rights and Women's liberation movements of the 1960s and 1970s, but in Brazil, the press for inclusion in academia came from academics and later filtered to other women's organizations. With Verônica Toste Daflon, she wrote Clássicas Do Pensamento Social Mulheres e Feminismos No Século XIX (Classics of Social Thought: Women and Feminisms in the 19th Century), which examined the omission of women as social theorists throughout history. Among the list of theorists covered in the book were Anna J. Cooper, Ercilia Nogueira Cobra, Charlotte Perkins Gilman, Alexandra Kollontai, Harriet Martineau, Pandita Ramabai, Olive Schreiner, and Alfonsina Storni, who were selected to represent each global geographic area. The women were chosen to expand the dialogue from the known suffrage fight to other issues confronting women, such as sexuality, representation, subordination, and violence.

== Selected works ==
- Sorj, Bila (1979). The Formation of Ideology Amongst Brazilian Steel Workers (PhD). Manchester, UK: University of Manchester. OCLC 156877030.
- Heilborn, Maria Luiza; Sorj, Bila (1999). "Estudos de gênero no Brasil 1975–1995 [Gender Studies in Brazil 1975–1995]" (PDF). In Miceli, Sergio (ed.). O que ler na ciência social brasileira: 1970–1995 [What to Read in Brazilian Social Science (1970–1995)] (in Portuguese). Vol. 1. São Paulo, Brazil: Associação Nacional de Pós-Graduação e Pesquisa em Ciências Sociais. pp. 183–221. ISBN 978-85-85408-28-2.
- Flint, Guila; Sorj, Bila Grin (2000). Israel terra em transe: democracia ou teocracia? [Israel Land in a Trance: Democracy or Theocracy?] (in Portuguese). Rio de Janeiro, Brazil: Civilização Brasileira. ISBN 978-85-200-0525-5.
- Sorj, Bila (January 2000). "Sociologia e trabalho: mutações, encontros e desencontros" [Sociology and Work: Mutations, Encounters and Disagreements]. Revista Brasileira de Ciências Sociais (in Portuguese). 15 (43). São Paulo, Brazil: Associação Nacional de Pós-Graduação e Pesquisa em Ciências Sociais: 25–34. doi:10.1590/S0102-69092000000200002. ISSN 0102-6909. OCLC 7179273119.
- Sorj, Bila; Carusi, Danielle; Quintaes, Giovanni (2004). Reconciling Work and Family: Issues and Policies in Brazil. Geneva, Switzerland: International Labour Office. ISBN 978-92-2-115835-6.
- Sorj, Bila (August 2013). "Arenas de cuidado nas interseções entre gênero e classe social" [Care Arenas at the Intersections between Gender and Social Class]. Cadernos de Pesquisa (in Portuguese). 43 (149). São Paulo, Brazil: Fundação Carlos Chagas: 478–491. doi:10.1590/S0100-15742013000200006. ISSN 0100-1574. OCLC 9456492588.
- Guimarães, Nadia Araujo; Maruani, Margaret; Sorj, Bila (2016). Genre, race, classe. Travailler en France et au Bresil [Gender, Race, Class: Working in France and Brazil] (in French). Paris, France: Editions L'Harmattan. ISBN 978-2-14-001046-0.
- Toste Daflon, Verônica; Sorj, Bila (2021). Clássicas Do Pensamento Social Mulheres e Feminismos No Século XIX [Classics of Social Thought: Women and Feminisms in the 19th Century] (in Portuguese) (1st ed.). Rio de Janeiro, Brazil: Roda dos Tempos. ISBN 978-65-89828-05-1.
