= Egriselda López =

Salvadoran diplomat

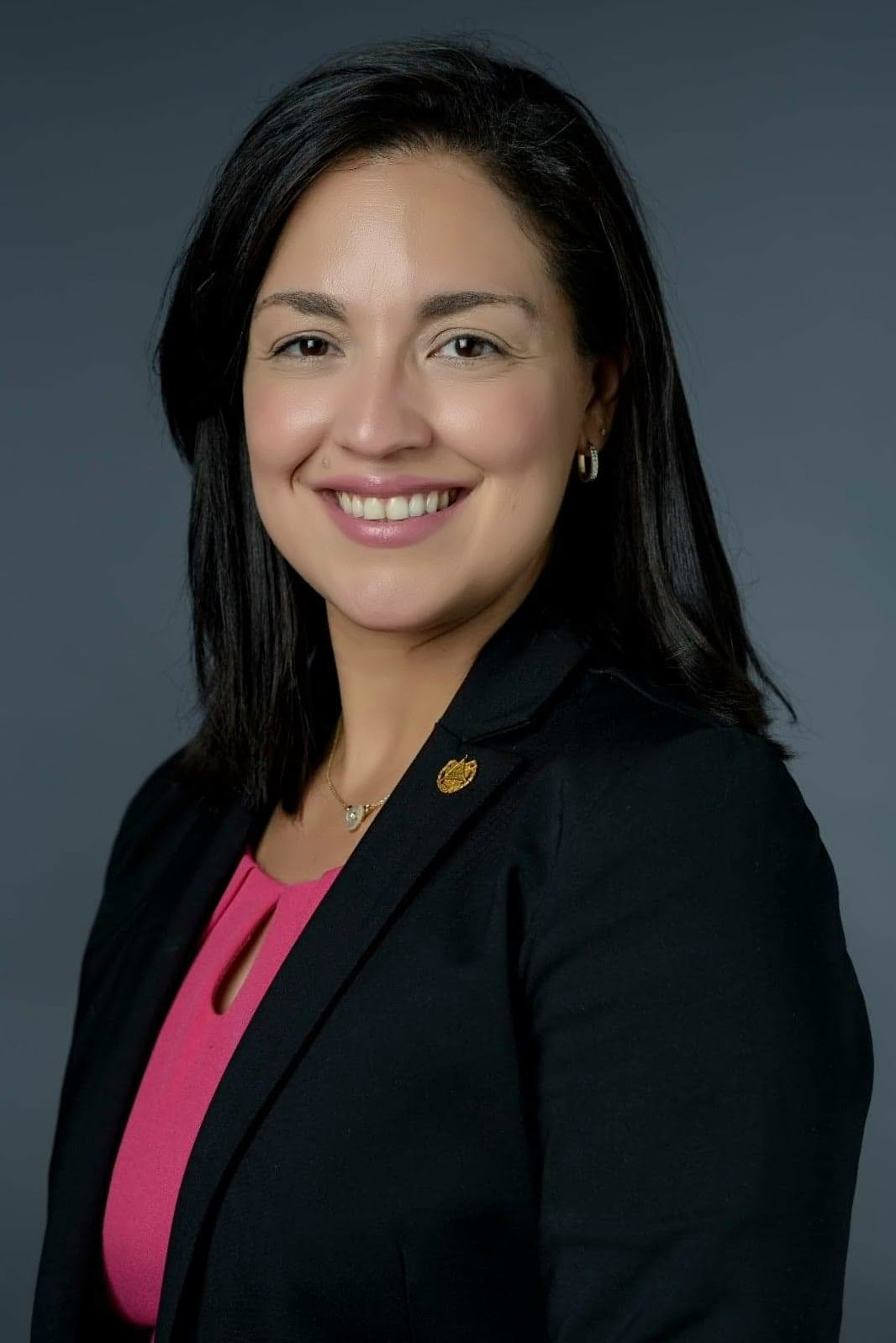
Permanent Representative of El Salvador to the United Nations, Amb. Egriselda López

Egriselda Aracely González López (born 1983) is a Salvadoran diplomat.

In August 2019, López became the Permanent Representative of El Salvador to the United Nations, New York.

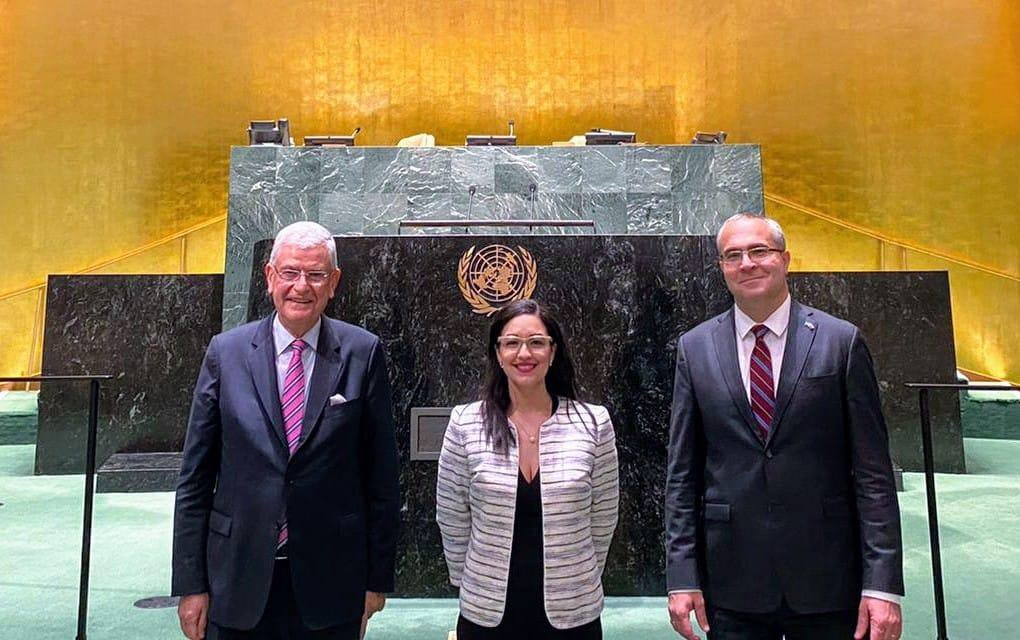
H.E. Volkan Bozkir, President of the General Assembly, appointed H.E. Egriselda López, H.E. Michal Mlynár, as co-chairs of the Ad Hoc Working Group on the Revitalization of the Work of the General Assembly

López was appointed in November 2020, by the President of the 75th Session of the General Assembly, H.E. Mr. Volkan Bozkir, as a co-chair of the Ad Hoc working Group on the Revitalization of the Work of the General Assembly (AHWG).

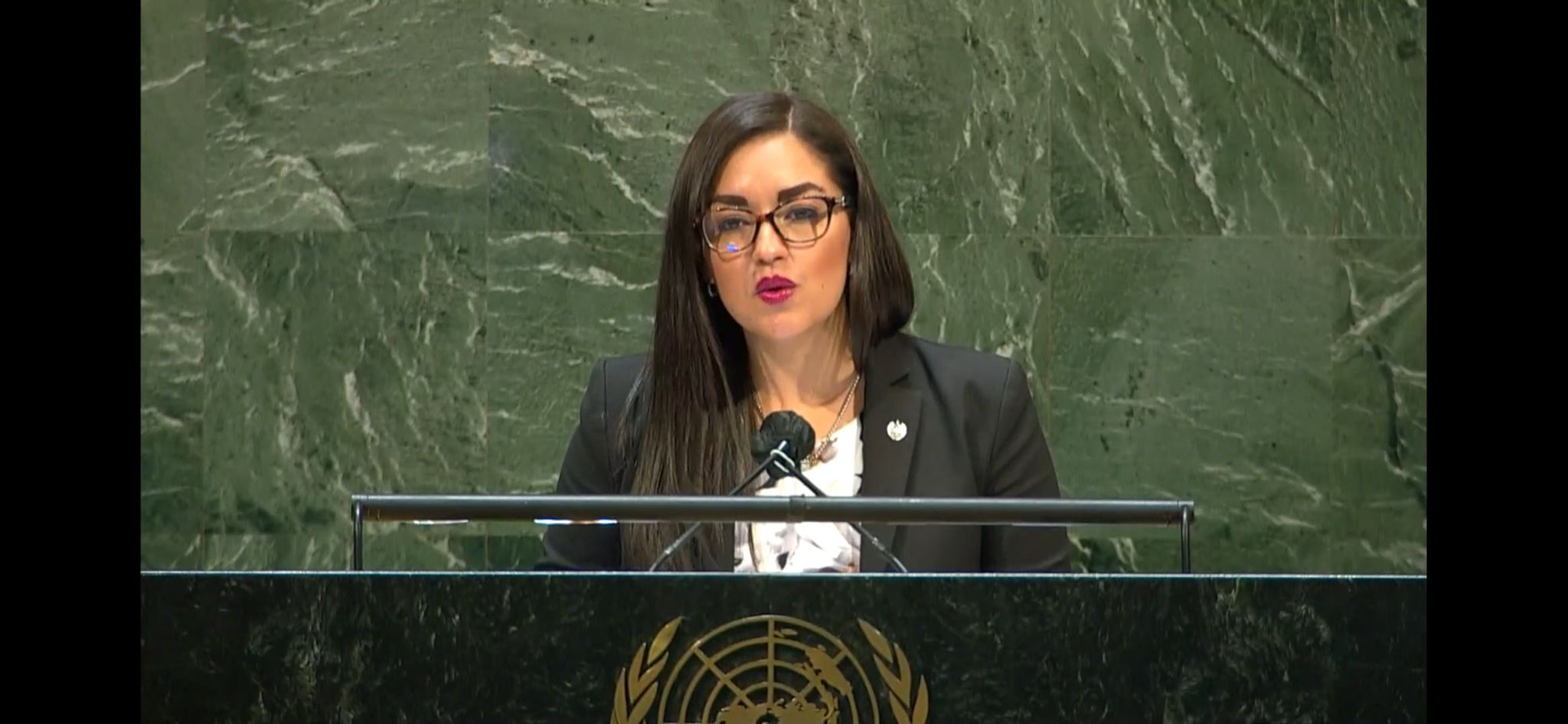
Ambassador, Permanent Representative of El Salvador, H.E. Mrs. Egriselda López, addressing the General Assembly of the United Nations

In June 2021, López was elected Chair of the 4th Committee (Special Political and Decolonization) of the United Nations General Assembly, for its 76th Session.

From 2013 to 2016, she served as Counsellor -later promoted to Minister Counsellor- at the Permanent Mission of El Salvador to the United Nations in New York. From 2010 to 2013, she was Counsellor and Deputy Head of Mission at El Salvador's Embassy in the Republic of Korea.

López began her career at the Ministry of Foreign Affairs of El Salvador in 2007, where she worked as an advisor on multilateral affairs. Besides serving as a diplomat, she has experience working in NGOs and think tanks in San Salvador and Geneva.

López holds a Master of Public Administration from the John F. Kennedy School of Government at Harvard University (2018), a Master of International Affairs from the Graduate Institute of International and Development Studies (2018) in Geneva, Switzerland, and a Bachelor of International Relations from the University of El Salvador (2006).

At the Graduate Institute for International Development Studies, she completed a dissertation on gender parity in the Salvadoran Foreign Service (2018).

López's native language is Spanish, she speaks English, French and Portuguese.

López is married and has a daughter.
