= Global Commission on Drug Policy =

International panel

The Global Commission on Drug Policy (GCDP) is a panel of world leaders and intellectuals, with a secretariat based in Geneva, Switzerland. In June 2011, the commission said: "The global war on drugs has failed, with devastating consequences for individuals and societies around the world." The emphasis in drug policy on harsh law enforcement over four decades has not accomplished its goal of banishing drugs and has in fact spawned wide, dramatic eruptions of violence, the report continued. By way of alternative, the GCDP report "advocates decriminalizing drug use by those who do no harm to others."

The commission was formed to "bring to the international level an informed, science-based discussion about humane and effective ways to reduce the harm caused by drugs to people and societies. [It built] on the experience of the Latin American Commission on Drugs and Democracy" and extended to West Africa in 2013–14 via an initiative of GCPD board member and former UN secretary general Kofi Annan and the West Africa Commission on Drugs. It is hosted by the Geneva Graduate Institute, a graduate school located in Geneva.

At year-end 2017, GCDP board member George Shultz and economist and former secretary of finance in Mexico Pedro Aspe reaffirmed the message of the commission in a New York Times op-ed. The commission has been successively chaired by Fernando Henrique Cardoso, the former president of Brazil, Ruth Dreifuss, former president of Switzerland, and Helen Clark, former prime minister of New Zealand. The Secretariat handles the daily operations of the commission under the leadership of its director, Khalid Tinasti.

== Membership ==
Members of the Global Commission on Drug Policy:

- Louise Arbour, former high commissioner for human rights, Canada
- Pavel Bém (Czech Republic) former mayor of Prague, member of the Parliament, Czech Republic
- Richard Branson (United Kingdom), entrepreneur, advocate for social causes, founder of the Virgin Group, co-founder of the Elders
- Fernando Henrique Cardoso (Brazil), former president of Brazil (former chair)
- Maria Cattaui (Switzerland), former secretary-general of the International Chamber of Commerce
- Helen Clark, former prime minister of New Zealand and administrator of the United Nations Development Programme (UNDP)
- Nick Clegg (United Kingdom), former deputy prime minister
- Ruth Dreifuss (Switzerland), former president of Switzerland and minister of home affairs (chair in 2016)
- Mohamed ElBaradei (Egypt 'in exile'), former director general of the International Atomic Energy Agency from 1997 to 2009 and Nobel Peace Prize laureate
- Geoff Gallop (Australia), former premier of Western Australia
- César Gaviria (Colombia), former president of Colombia
- Anand Grover (India), former United Nations special rapporteur on the right of everyone to the enjoyment of the highest attainable standard of physical and mental health
- Michel Kazatchkine (France), UN secretary-general's special envoy on HIV/AIDS in Eastern Europe and Central Asia and former executive director of the Global Fund to Fight AIDS, Tuberculosis and Malaria
- Aleksander Kwaśniewski (Poland), former president of Poland
- Ricardo Lagos (Chile), former president of Chile
- Kgalema Motlanthe (South Africa), former president of South Africa
- Olusegun Obasanjo (Nigeria), former president of Nigeria
- George Papandreou (Greece), former prime minister of Greece
- José Ramos-Horta, former prime minister and president of Timor-Leste
- Juan Manuel Santos (Colombia), former president of Colombia
- Michel Sidibé (Mali), former UNAIDS executive director and under-secretary-general of the United Nations, and former minister of health and social affairs of Mali
- Javier Solana (Spain), former European Union high representative for the common foreign and security policy
- Cassam Uteem (Mauritius), former president of Mauritius
- Ernesto Zedillo (Mexico), former president of Mexico

=== Former members ===
- Kofi Annan (Ghana), former chairman of the Kofi Annan Foundation and secretary-general of the United Nations (deceased 2018; board member in memoriam)
- Carlos Fuentes (Mexico), writer and public intellectual (deceased May 15, 2012; board member in memoriam)
- Asma Jahangir (Pakistan), human rights activist, former United Nations Special Rapporteur on Arbitrary, Extrajudicial and Summary Executions (deceased 2018; board member in memoriam)
- Mario Vargas Llosa (Peru), writer and public intellectual, Nobel Prize laureate (deceased 2025; board member in memoriam)
- Jorge Sampaio (Portugal), former president of Portugal (deceased 2021; board member in memoriam)
- George Shultz (United States), former United States secretary of state (deceased 2021; former honorary chair; board member in memoriam)
- Thorvald Stoltenberg (Norway), former minister of foreign affairs and United Nations high commissioner for refugees (deceased 2018; board member in memoriam)
- Paul Volcker (United States), former chairman of the Federal Reserve and of the Economic Recovery Advisory Board (deceased 2019; board member in memoriam)
- John C. Whitehead (United States), banker and civil servant, chair of the World Trade Center Memorial (deceased 2015; board member in memoriam)

== Reactions to the 2011 report ==
=== Immediate ===
Gabor Maté, a Hungarian-Canadian physician who specializes in study and treatment of addiction, was interviewed on Democracy Now! about the report.

Former U.S. president Jimmy Carter wrote an op-ed in The New York Times explicitly endorsing the recommendations of the commission, saying they were in line with the policies of his administration; and saying it was the policies of the succeeding Reagan administration which had moved U.S. policy so far toward punitive alternatives. Carter's piece elicited several published responses, including one from an analyst for Common Sense for Drug Policy who drew attention to the current White House Office of National Drug Control Policy's immediate rejection of GCDP's recommendations and defense of the "balanced drug control efforts" of the U.S. federal government; and others which agreed and disagreed with Carter's views.

Brian Lehrer had Ethan Nadelmann, founder and director of the Drug Policy Alliance, on Lehrer's radio show to detail the GCDP report and how that might impact U.S. anti-drug policies.

Sir Ronald Sanders, a consultant and former Caribbean diplomat, wrote in favor of the recommendations and endorsement of President Carter's expressed views.

=== Extended ===
Peter Hakim prominently cited the GCDP report in an October, 2011, "rethinking [of] U.S. drug policy".

The Beckley Foundation's Global Initiative for Drug Policy Reform antedated the release of the GCDP report but integrated the GCPD into its November, 2011, British House of Lords meetings. Professor Robin Room (University of Melbourne) was preparing a "Rewriting the UN Drug Conventions Report" based on amendments to the UN drug control conventions of 1961, 1971 and 1988 for the Initiative; and Professor Stephen Pudney (Institute for Social and Economic Research) was preparing "the first-ever Cost-benefit Analysis of the control of cannabis through regulation and taxation in the UK" for it. Amanda Feilding of the Foundation and other peers led the effort and attracted some criticism for it.

=== Background papers ===
as of 2011-11-25

- "Demand reduction and harm reduction", by Dr Alex Wodak AM
- "Drug policy, criminal justice and mass imprisonment", by Bryan Stevenson
- "Assessing supply-side policy and practice: Eradication and alternative development, by David Mansfield
- "The development of international drug control: Lessons learned and strategic challenges for the future" by Martin Jelsma
- "Drug policy: Lessons learned and options for the future", by Mike Trace
- "The drug trade: The politicization of criminals and the criminalization of politicians" by Moisés Naím

== 2014 Report - Taking Control: Pathways to Drug Policies That Work ==
On September 9, 2014, the commission issued its new report, Taking Control: Pathways to Drug Policies that Work. "The report reflects the evolution in the thinking of the commissioners, who reiterate their demands for decriminalization, alternatives to incarceration, and greater emphasis on public health approaches and now also call for permitting the legal regulation of psychoactive substances. The commission is the most distinguished group of high-level leaders to ever call for such far-reaching changes."

== Disappointment with UNGASS 2016 ==
In April 2016, the GCDP reacted to the United Nations General Assembly Special Session (UNGASS) drug conference, saying the commission was "profoundly disappointed with the adopted outcome document". The Wall Street Journal lumped the attendees' positions "somewhat" in two camps: "Some European and South American countries as well as the U.S. favored softer approaches. Eastern countries such as China and Russia and most Muslim nations like Iran, Indonesia and Pakistan remained staunchly opposed." Mexican president Enrique Peña Nieto said “We must move beyond prohibition to effective prevention” and that Mexico was considering legalizing medical marijuana and limited decriminalization of the drug. GCDP member Branson was quoted as saying the conference outcome was "out of step with world sentiment and doubles down on status quo”.

== 2016 Report - Advancing Drug Policy Reform: A New Approach to Decriminalization ==
In November 2016 GCDP released the report, Advancing Drug Policy Reform: a new approach to decriminalization.

Commission chair Dreifuss said about the report:

After years of denouncing the dramatic effects of prohibition and the criminalization of people that do no harm but use drugs on the society as a whole, it is time to highlight the benefits of well-designed and well-implemented people-centered drug policies. These innovative policies cannot exist as long as we do not discuss, honestly, the major policy error made in the past, which is the criminalization of personal consumption or possession of illicit psychoactive substances in national laws.

== Position Paper - The Opioid Crisis in North America ==
On 2 October 2017, the Global Commission published a position paper on the opioid crisis in North America. This opioid-driven public health crisis has reached alarming proportions, contributing in 2016 to an estimated 64,000 deaths from drug overdoses in the US, and some 2,500 in Canada. The members of the Global Commission on Drug Policy, several of whom faced similar crises while occupying the highest levels of government in their own countries, share in this position paper their views and recommendations on how to mitigate this epidemic.

== 2017 Report - The World Drug Perception Problem: Countering Prejudices About People Who Use Drugs ==
While previous reports by the Global Commission on Drug Policy showed how the potential harms of drugs for people and communities are exacerbated by repressive drug control policies at local, national and international levels, the Global Commission's 2017 report, "The World Drug Perception Problem - Countering Prejudices About People Who Use Drugs" focuses on how current perceptions of drugs and people who use them feed into and off prohibitionist policies. Indeed, drug policy reforms have been difficult to design, legislate or implement because current policies and responses are often based on perceptions and passionate beliefs, and what should be factual discussions leading to effective policies are frequently treated as moral debates. The present report aims to analyze the most common perceptions and fears, contrast them with available evidence on drugs and the people who use them, and provides recommendations on changes that must be enacted to support reforms toward more effective drug policies.

== Position Paper - Drug Policy and The Sustainable Development Agenda ==
The Sustainable Development Goals and Agenda 2030 are meant to be a transformational agenda to eradicate poverty, achieve gender equity or save the planet through their implementation. This implementation, based on coherent public policies, is still lacking at the national, regional and international levels. This is most visible in drug policy, where voices from health, human rights and science call for reform, while most countries continue to privilege ideology through law-enforcement and militarization.

The members of the Global Commission on Drug Policy draw from their experience at the highest policy and political levels to provide an analysis of how - beyond powerful words and slogans - sustainable development is impeded by drug control while providing a single, groundbreaking recommendation to address this situation.

== 2018 Report - Regulation: The Responsible Control of Drugs ==
The Global Commission on Drug Policy released its 2018 report on the responsible control of drugs in Mexico City. The report examined in detail how governments can take control of currently illegal drug markets through responsible regulation, thereby weakening criminal organizations that now profit from the illegal markets.

The new report provided a roadmap for transitioning from illegal to legally regulated drug markets. It offered answers regarding the organizational capacity of state institutions to regulate and control a legal market of potentially dangerous products. It highlighted the challenges facing impoverished populations that constitute the “working class” of the illegal drug markets. It offered possible ways forward to deal with the risks inherent to the resilience of organized crime. Finally, this report called for a reform of the prohibition-based international drug control system, which is compromising a universal and holistic approach to the “drug problem”.

== Position Paper - Drug Policy and Deprivation of Liberty ==
This paper shows how the deprivation of liberty for non-violent drug crimes is a wrong and ineffective response, notably because it does not take into account the social and psychological root causes of drug consumption, nor does it consider the economic and social marginalization of low-level actors in the trade. Furthermore, people who are incarcerated are vulnerable, exposed to risks, particularly health risks, for which they are not well-equipped and do not receive adequate care.

In this report, members of the Global Commission on Drug Policy analyze the last thirty years of over incarceration in closed settings, from prisons to migrant administrative detention and from mandatory treatment to private rehabilitation centers. The paper highlights the responsibility of the State towards people who are incarcerated, and demonstrates how their health and well-being are at risk.

== 2019 Report - Classification of Psychoactive Substances: When Science Was Left Behind ==
In Classification of Drugs: when science was left behind, the Global Commission on Drug Policy explains how the biased historical classification of psychoactive substances has contributed to the "world drug problem". It is the first-ever comprehensive report providing a political reading of the current evaluation and classification, or "scheduling" of drugs according to their harms.

Psychoactive substances should be classified with regard to their potential for dependence and other harms. This is not the case today, where some substances are legally available because they are considered beneficial (medicines) or culturally important (alcohol), while others are seen as destructive, and are strictly prohibited. The classification of drugs is at the core of the international drug control system. As such, governments must ensure that such a classification is pragmatic and based on science and evidence, makes clear the benefits and harms of drugs, and allows for responsible legal regulatory models to control drugs.
