= Latin American Commission on Drugs and Democracy =

The Latin American Commission on Drugs and Democracy was a panel of Latin American leaders and intellectuals, co-chaired by former presidents Fernando Henrique Cardoso (Brazil), César Gaviria (Colombia) and Ernesto Zedillo (Mexico).

In March 2009, the commission issued a report which "declared the war on drugs a failure," according to one commentator. The commentator drew parallels with the Prohibition in the United States and also reviewed signs of relaxing attitudes toward drugs prohibition in 2009. Another commentator cited Jeffrey Miron of Harvard's work on the subject, Senator James Webb's call for a commission on the subject, and a study by Glenn Greenwald about Portugal's policy of decriminalization published by the Cato Institute while also supporting in general the conclusions of the Latin American Initiative.

== Members ==
Commissioners of the LAI were:

- César Gaviria Trujillo (Colombia), president of Colombia (1990-94) and secretary general of the Organization of American States (1994-2004) - co-president of LAI
- Ernesto Zedillo Ponce de León (Mexico), president of Mexico (1994-2000) and professor and director of the Center of Globalization Studies at Yale University – co-president of LAI
- Fernando Henrique Cardoso (Brazil), president of Brazil (1995-2002) and professor at the University of São Paulo – co-president of LAI
- Ana María Romero de Campero (Bolivia), reporter, editor, chronicler, international correspondent, columnist and director of the newspaper Presencia for seven years; 30-year career as journalist
- General Alberto Cardoso (Brazil), Chief Institutional Cabinet Minister of the presidency of Brazil.
- Antanas Mockus (Colombia), president of Corporación Visionários por Colômbia (Corpovisionarios), a non-profit, ex-dean of the National University of Colombia (1991-93) and ex-mayor of Bogotá (1995-97, 2001-03)
- Diego García Sayán (Peru), judge and vice-president of the Inter-American Court of Human Rights, minister of justice in Peru (2000-01) and, later, minister of foreign relations, Peru
- Enrique Krauze (Mexico), teacher; research at the Colégio de México and St Antony's College, Oxford; worked for the magazine Vuelta (1977-96)
- Enrique Santos Calderón (Colombia), director, columnist of the Sunday edition of the newspaper El Tiempo; co-founded and directed the weekly magazine Alternativa with his colleague Gabriel García Márquez(1974-80)
- João Roberto Marinho (Brazil), vice-president of the administration council and editorial vice-president of the Globo Organizations
- Mario Vargas Llosa (Peru), writer, 2010 Nobel Prize for Literature, column "Piedra de Toque" for El País (Madrid)
- Moisés Naím (Venezuela), editor-in-chief of Foreign Policy magazine based in Washington, D.C.; minister of trade and industry of Venezuela (early 1990s) and then executive director of the World Bank; syndicated Sunday columns for El País
- Patricia Llerena (Argentina), Chamber Judge of the Oral Criminal Tribunal in the city of Buenos Aires and former assistant manager of the Central Bank of the Republic of Argentina
- Paulo Coelho (Brazil), writer, according to Reuters (October 3, 2003), among the three best known and most successful in the world
- Sergio Ramírez (Nicaragua), writer and part of the National Council of Government (1979) and later, vice-president, of Nicaragua
- Sonia Picado Sotela (Costa Rica), member of the Human Security Advisory Committee of the UN; president of the Inter-American Institute of Human Rights (2002); president of the United Nations Voluntary Fund for Victims of Torture (2005-08); Deputy of the Legislative Assembly of Costa Rica (1998-2002); judge of the Inter-American Court of Human Rights (1988-94) and Ambassador of Costa Rica in the United States(1994-98).
- Tomás Eloy Martínez (Argentina), professor at Rutgers University (1995-present) and director of the Latin American Studies program; writer in Argentina until 1975, thereafter in exile

== Legacy ==
The Global Commission on Drug Policy, chaired by President Cardoso, followed on the work of the LAI and issued a report in 2011. The Global Commission included presidents Zedillo and Gaviria and writer Llosa, and they were joined by, among others, former United Nations Secretary General Kofi Annan, former NATO Secretary General Javier Solana; former US Secretary of State George Shultz, former US Federal Reserve chairman Paul Volcker, writer Carlos Fuentes and businessman activist Richard Branson.
