= Haitian crisis =

Ongoing socioeconomic and political crisis in Haiti

- Part of Crime in Haiti
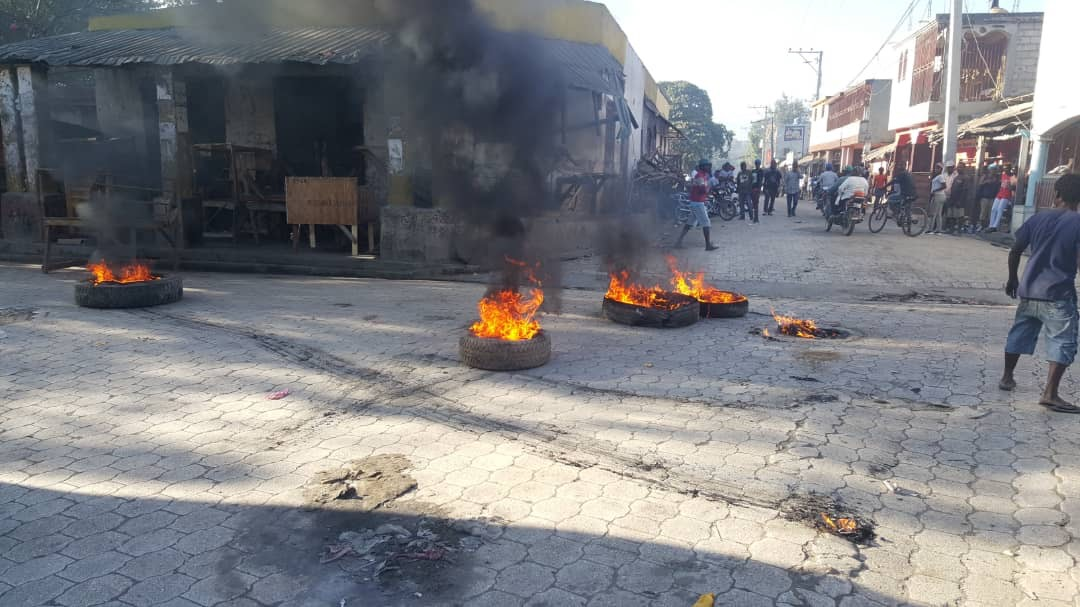
- Tire fires caused by protesters in Hinche, February 2019
- Date: 7 July 2018 – present (8 years, 4 months, 2 weeks and 1 day)
- Location: Haiti
- Caused by: Misuse of loans from Venezuela (Petrocaribe) and social inequality; Rising taxes on gasoline, diesel, and kerosene, and poor living conditions; Corruption, impunity; 2021 causes: Authoritarianism, fear of dictatorship, and international support for President Jovenel Moïse; Moïse's bid to extend his term, police officers killed, and alleged assassination–coup d'état attempt; Police brutality, human rights abuses, and violence against protesters; 2022–2024 causes: Imposition of Prime Minister Ariel Henry by the Core Group; Haitian conflict
- Goals: 2018–2021 goals: Resignation of Moïse, installation of transitional government, and fresh general elections; 2022–2024 goals: Resignation of Ariel Henry; End of armed gang violence, kidnappings, and killings; End to impunity and corruption in Haiti, and better living conditions; Release of 33 judges and 23 officers arrested after the alleged 2021 coup d'état attempt
- Status: Ongoing
- Concessions: Assassination of Jovenel Moïse; Haitian conflict; Resignation of Ariel Henry

Parties
(Haiti) Protesters; Major armed gangs; Viv Ansanm; G9; G-Pep; 400 Mawozo; Gran Grif	Government of Haiti; Gang Suppression Force: Kenya; Jamaica; The Bahamas; Barbados; Guyana; Antigua and Barbuda; Suriname; St. Vincent and the Grenadines; Dominica; Grenada; Bangladesh; Chad; El Salvador; Saint Lucia; Benin; Belize; Guatemala; Mongolia; Ivory Coast; Sri Lanka; Guinea; Senegal; Haitian National Police; Armed Forces of Haiti

Lead figures
(Haiti) Jean-Charles Moïse; (Haiti) Jimmy Chérizier; (Haiti) Guy Philippe; (Haiti) Schiller Louidor	Jovenel Moïse X; (Haiti) Fritz William Michel; (Haiti) Jean-Michel Lapin; (Haiti) Jean-Henry Céant; (Haiti) Jack Guy Lafontant; (Haiti) Ariel Henry; (Haiti) Garry Conille; (Haiti) Alix Didier Fils-Aimé

Casualties and losses
- 5000+ killed, 2000+ injured, 2000+ kidnapped since 1 January 2023; 600,000+ displaced as of 28 August 2024

The existing political, economic, and social crisis began with protests across cities in Haiti on 7 July 2018 in response to rising fuel prices. These protests gradually evolved into demands for the resignation of President Jovenel Moïse. Led by opposition politician Jean-Charles Moïse, (Note: No relation to Jovenel Moïse.) protesters demanded a transitional government, provision of social programs, and the prosecution of corrupt officials. From 2019 to 2021, massive protests called for the Jovenel Moïse government to resign. Moïse had come to power in the 2016 presidential election, which had voter turnout of only 21%. Previously, the 2015 elections had been annulled due to fraud. On 7 February 2021, supporters of the opposition allegedly attempted a coup d'état, leading to 23 arrests, as well as clashes between protestors and police.

On 7 July 2021, President Moïse was assassinated, allegedly by a group of 28 foreign mercenaries; three of the suspected assassins were killed and 20 arrested, while police searched for the other gunmen and the organizers of the attack. On 20 July, Ariel Henry assumed the office of acting prime minister.

In September 2022, further protests erupted in response to rising energy prices, and a federation of gangs created a blockade around Haiti's largest fuel depot. Combined with an outbreak of cholera and widespread acute hunger, the crisis led the United Nations Security Council to impose sanctions on Jimmy Chérizier, one of the country's gang leaders. In 2022, Canada issued sanctions against three wealthy businessmen—Gilbert Bigio, Reynold Deeb, and Sherif Abdallah—whom they accused of "participat[ing] in gross and systematic human rights violations in Haiti" along with numerous politicians including Michel Martelly, Laurent Lamothe, Jean-Henry Céant, Joseph Lambert, and Youri Latortue. A UN report to the Security Council in October 2023 likewise identified Martelly, Deeb, and Latortue as having ties to gangs.

In March 2024, acting Prime Minister Henry was prevented from returning to Haiti after a trip intended to secure a peace-keeping force of Kenyan police to fight gang violence. The power vacuum and chaos in the streets led to the scheduling of an emergency CARICOM meeting on 11 March. The same day, Henry announced his resignation under pressure from protesters, gangs, and the international community, effective upon the naming of a new prime minister and cabinet by a transitional council.

== Background and origins ==
A Senate probe released in November 2017 concerning the 2008–2016 period (the René Préval and Michel Martelly administrations) revealed significant corruption had been funded with Venezuelan loans through the Petrocaribe program. With the departure of the United Nations force in 2017, the power vacuum was occupied by gangs, some of which had been fostered, financed, and even created by Martelly, famous for his 2008 Bandi légal album and his ties to right-wing elements in the police.

Protests broke out in February 2021 amid a dispute over President Jovenel Moïse's term. The protesters claimed that Moïse's term officially ended on 7 February 2021 and demanded that he step down. Moïse said that Haitian presidents have five years to serve according to the constitution and that he had one more year to serve since he only became president in February 2017. Protesters also expressed concerns about the 2021 Haitian constitutional referendum, a referendum proposed by Moïse which would reportedly scrap the ban on consecutive presidential terms and enable Moïse to run again.

From 2017 to 2021, with Haiti's political leadership deadlocked, public administration virtually shut down due to a lack of funding, and the judicial system in shambles, gangs seized political power through co-operative politicians, and economic control through financing by the business elite, protection rackets, kidnappings and murders.

== Beginning (2018–2019) ==
=== 2018 protests ===
Venezuela, because of its economic crisis, stopped shipping oil to Haiti in March 2018, causing fuel shortages. On 6 July 2018, the Haitian government announced an increase in the price of kerosene by 51 percent, diesel by 47 percent, and gasoline by 38 percent, which was followed by protests and rioting. U.S. airlines canceled flights into and out of Haiti. The government suspended the price increases, and the president accepted the resignation of the inexperienced Jack Guy Lafontant as prime minister on 14 July 2018, replaced one month later by Jean-Henry Céant.

In mid-August 2018, Haitian-Canadian Gilbert Mirambeau Jr. tweeted a photo of himself blindfolded holding a cardboard sign with "Kot kòb PetwoKaribe a ?" ("Where did the PetroCaribe money go?") written on it. The hashtag petrocaribechallenge was soon circulated on social media. According to Shearon Roberts, such messaging served initially to inform the international community that a regime change effort was underway. Haitian media then shared the hashtag offline, amplifying the message within the country.

Anger over the revelations and accusations from the continuing investigation simmered into the autumn and boiled over again, first in October 2018, with tense scenes and violence in Les Cayes, in Jacmel, and in Saint-Marc. A week of protests in November 2018 led to 10 deaths, including several killed when a government car "lost a wheel and plowed into a crowd."

=== 2019 protests ===
==== February ====
Significant protests broke out again in February 2019 following a report from the court investigating the Petrocaribe Senate probe. Economic problems and the increased cost of living helped fuel the protests.

On 7 February, protesters targeted and damaged wealthy Haitians' luxury vehicles. The following day, the mayors of Pétion-Ville and Port-au-Prince announced the cancellation of pre-Haitian Carnival events. Two days later protestors clashed with police, with demonstrators throwing stones at the home of President Moïse, after one of his allies' security personnel struck a woman's car and began to beat her. On 12 February, protesters burned down a popular market, looted stores and assisted with a prison break in Aquin that freed all of the facility's prisoners. In Port-au-Prince, the building housing the Italian and Peruvian consulates was looted by protesters.

Moïse addressed the country on 14 February, saying he would not step down and "give the country up to armed gangs and drug traffickers." During a funeral procession on 22 February, Haitian police fired tear gas at a crowd of about 200 people carrying the casket of a man killed during protests days earlier. Opposition leader Schiller Louidor called for future protests, though the overall size of protests began to subside that day.

==== March ====
Three days after the lower house voted a censure motion against Céant's government on 18 March, Moïse replaced Céant with Jean-Michel Lapin. The change was not ratified Haitian Parliament for several months, which cost the country hundreds of millions in international aid—for which having a sitting government was a prerequisite.

==== June ====
During escalating protests on 10 June, journalist Rospide Petion was shot and killed in a company car on his way home from Radio Sans Fin in Port-au-Prince, where he had criticized the government on air before leaving the station.

==== October ====
On 4 October, thousands protested across Haiti. In Port-au-Prince, the mayor joined the protestors in calling for Moïse to step down. Two days earlier, the opposition sent a letter by delegation to the UN Secretary General denouncing the sitting president's role in the Petrocaribe affair and the government's role in a massacre in La Saline, a neighborhood in Port-au-Prince. Lyonel Trouillot wrote in L'Humanité "[w]ithout dipping into conspiracy theory, there is something worrying about the international community's silence about the Haitian situation."

On 11 October, Néhémie Joseph, another radio journalist critical of the government, was found dead in the trunk of his car in Mirebalais. On 22 October, thousands of Catholics demonstrated in the capital. Archbishop Max Leroy Mésidor asked Haitian leaders to heed the people who "cannot go on any longer. We are fed up." Energy crises, road blockages (called VAR by gangs, as they halt the flow of traffic and are often used as checkpoints to collect money), and widespread unrest have led to massive drops in tourism, causing the closure of hotels in Pétion-Ville, where the Best Western Premier closed permanently, and in Cap-Haïtien, where Mont Joli was closed. Two people were killed in protests in Port-au-Prince on 27 October. Masked police officers were out on the streets demonstrating that day because of low salaries and lack of health insurance. Although the Haitian constitution calls for legislative elections in October, none were held in October 2019. The United Nations announced they had counted 42 deaths and 86 injuries since mid-September.

==== November ====
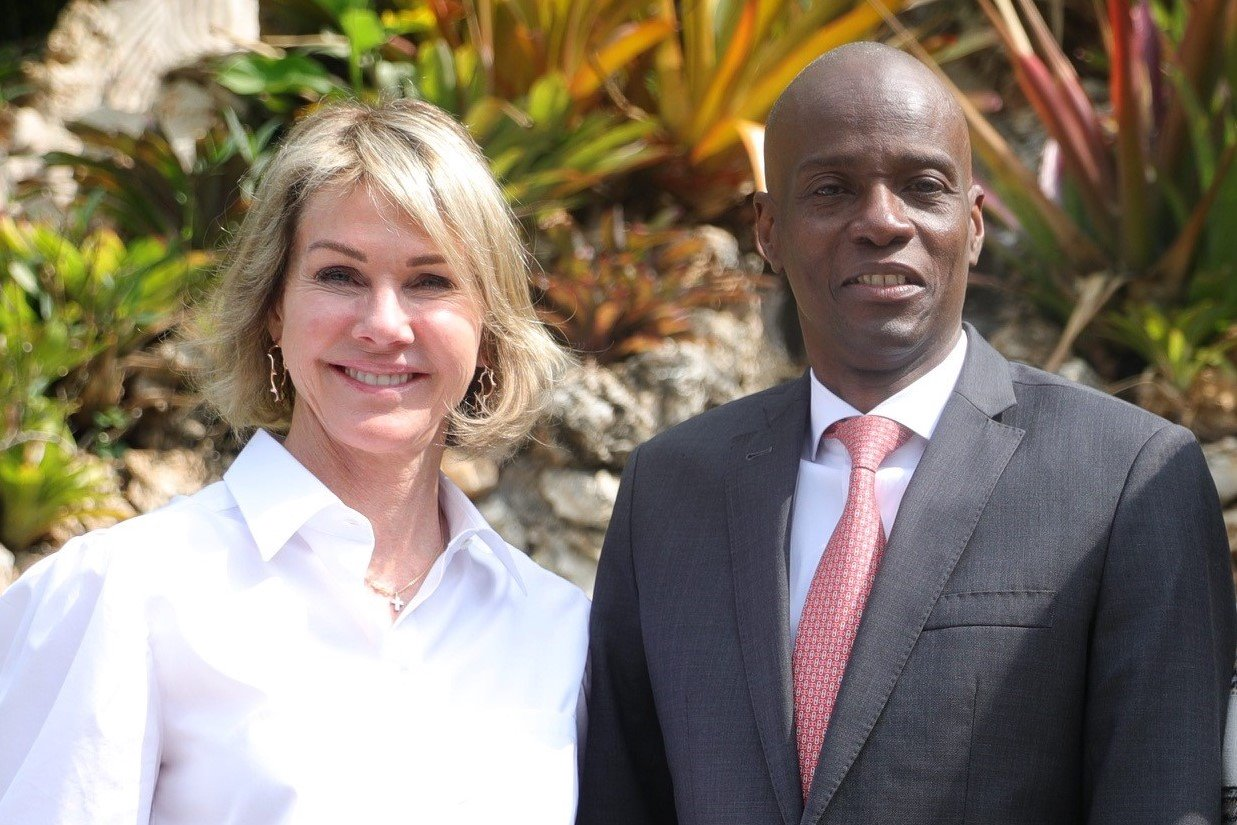
U.S. Ambassador to the UN Kelly Craft and President Jovenel Moïse met in November 2019 about ways to implement a consensual resolution of Haiti's political crisis.

Peyi lok ("country lockdown") is how the situation was described in Haitian Creole in November 2019 after two and a half months with schools, courts, businesses, public services, and economic production largely shut down.

==== December ====
Although parents and school directors still felt uneasy amidst barricades and gunfire, schools across the country began to reopen in December.

U.S. Under Secretary of State for Political Affairs David Hale visited Haiti on 6 December, following up on U.S. Ambassador to the UN Kelly Craft's November visit. During his visit, he met with the administration and with leaders from several opposing political parties, some of whom, including Fanmi Lavalas and Fusion-Mache Kontre, refused any collaboration with Moïse. On 10 December, the U.S. House Foreign Affairs Committee began hearings on the situation in Haiti, which Frederica Wilson had pushed for. At the hearing, Maxine Waters was sharply critical of U.S. support for Moïse. Neither the State Department nor USAID was present at the hearings.

=== 2019 actions ===
Moïse called for his opposition to participate in peaceful dialogue, saying that "the country's problems aren't solely political. The country's problems are social, economic and political." The national police stated that there are "malicious individuals" who had interrupted peaceful protests in the country. The opposition was being led by Jean-Charles Moïse. This opposition declined offers for dialogue, demanded President Moïse's resignation, and organized a nationwide general strike to attempt to force him to resign from office. Alongside opposition lawmakers, he called for a transitional government to replace Moïse: "If Jovenel Moïse does not want to step down from power, we are going to name an interim president in the coming days."

The Port-au-Prince newspaper Le Nouvelliste reported on 18 February 2019 that a Haitian citizen and seven non-Haitians were arrested in the city. At the time of their arrest, they were carrying rifles, pistols, drones, and satellite phones in their vehicle, which did not have any license plates. Haitian Foreign Minister Bocchit Edmond confirmed that among them were five Americans. According to the editor of Haiti Liberté, the group included two former Navy SEALs, a former Blackwater employee, and two Serbian mercenaries living in the U.S. They were tasked with protecting the former head of the National Lottery, who intended to transfer US$80 million from a PetroCaribe bank account—controlled jointly by the president, the prime minister, and the president of the Central Bank—to a bank account solely controlled by President Moïse.

== 2020–2022 ==
=== 2020 protests ===
In September and October 2020, more protests occurred throughout the country in reaction to the perception of an insufficient government response to the COVID-19 pandemic in Haiti, in particular concerning support for those who lost their jobs because of the lockdown. Due to the lack of parliamentary elections, Moïse was governing through executive orders. Police held protests demanding better pay and working conditions. The police exchanged fire with Haitian soldiers outside the National Palace where police were protesting working conditions in February. In early 2020, a United Nations report said the Haitian police were corrupt and failing to protect the population.

On 4 December, the Haitian National Police undertook its first operation under Léon Charles into Village de Dieu, in an effort to subdue the Five Seconds Base gang with tanks. While Charles claimed success, eye-witnesses were less convinced.

=== 2021 protests ===
==== January ====
On 14 January 2021, hundreds demonstrated in Port-au-Prince, Cap-Haïtien, Jacmel, Saint-Marc, and Gonaïves against Moïse. Most of the demonstrations were peaceful, but some violence was reported. On 20 January, hundreds again demonstrated in Port-au-Prince and Cap-Haitien to protest against Moïse. One woman was shot by rubber bullets, and several others were wounded during protests. On 28 January, journalists, lawmakers, police officers, retirees, former police officers, and human rights judges led protests against human rights abuses and police brutality, violence, and repression against protesters and chanted "When they don't get paid, we're the ones they call!"

==== February ====
On 7 February supporters of the opposition against Moïse allegedly attempted a coup d'état, claiming he should have stepped down five years after the end of Michel Martelly's administration on 7 Feb 2016, despite the year-long delay before he was sworn in in 2017. Moïse stated he had been the target of an assassination attempt and ordered the arrest of 23 people, including three Supreme Court judges. Throughout February, clashes with protesters and security forces occurred in Port-au-Prince, and Jacmel. On 25 February, at least 25 were killed and many injured during a prison break at Croix-des-Bouquet Civil Prison, during which gang leader Arnel Joseph escaped. Joseph was later found and killed in L'Estère.

==== March ====
Thousands of Haitians, including doctors and lawyers, demonstrated peacefully in Port-au-Prince on 7 and 9 March, under the slogan #FreeOurCountry, calling for Moïse and Prime Minister Joseph Jouthe to resign and a crackdown on kidnappers. The hashtag FreeHaiti led opposition demonstrations across Haiti on 15 March, to protest the killing of four police officers in a village in Port-au-Prince, corruption, and armed gangs controlling cities. On 17 March, the Fantom 509 militia staged a jailbreak to free four arrested police officers. In late March, protests were focused on the unpopular referendum to amend the constitution scheduled for 27 June ahead of legislative, local and presidential elections scheduled for the fall.

==== April ====
In April, protesters circled the Presidential Palace seven times drawing Vodou images in chalk on the ground in an effort to symbolically free themselves from the scourge of gang kidnappings. The protest was met by police firing tear gas.

==== July: Assassination of Jovenel Moïse ====
On 7 July 2021, Moïse was assassinated, allegedly by a group of 28 foreign mercenaries. Later that day, USGPN (L'Unité de Sécurité Générale du Palais National, or The General Security Unit of the National Palace) killed three of the suspected assassins and arrested 20 others. On 20 July, Ariel Henry assumed the office of prime minister. In September 2021, Henry fired a prosecutor who intended to question him about the record of phone calls, which he denied receiving, in the hours after the assassination from Joseph Felix Badio, whose involvement in the crime was suspected.

Badio was arrested by Haitian police in connection with the murder. A former Haitian senator, Joseph Joël John, who hoped to become president, a retired Colombian army officer, Germán Alejandro Rivera Garcia, a Haitian businessman, Rodolphe Jaar, and a former DEA informant, Joseph Vincent, were sentenced to life in prison in a Miami court for their roles in the assassination.

In February 2024, the fifth Haitian judge to lead the murder investigation charged Moïse's wife Martine Moïse and his prime minister Claude Joseph as co-conspirators in the assassination in part based on testimony from Badio. Joseph said that Henry was "weaponizing the Haitian justice system" and that the charges against him and against Moïse's widow were politically motivated. At the same time, former police chief Léon Charles was charged with both murder and attempted murder.

==== August 2021 earthquake ====
Barely a month into Ariel Henry's tenure, the country was struck once again by a powerful earthquake with a M_{W} of 7.2 off the coast of the Tiburon Peninsula, in the commune of Petit-Trou-de-Nippes. It was the deadliest earthquake globally of 2021, killing about 2,250 people. 12,700 people were injured and 330 went missing, and 136,800 buildings were damaged or destroyed.

=== 2022 crisis ===
==== Montana Accord ====
On 30 January, the Transition Council defined by the August 2021 Montana Accord (named for the hotel in Pétion-Ville where it was signed) elected the former interim prime minister and former Central Bank governor Fritz Jean as president and Steven Benoît as prime minister for a two-year transition government. While the political class called for him to step down at the end of Moïse's term (7 February 2022), Henry rejected these demands, along with the results of the Montana Accord election, as a "distraction", saying that organizing the next elections was part of his mandate.

==== Gang violence ====
In April–May 2022, major clashes between the rival gangs 400 Mawozo and Chen Mechan took place in the Plain of the Cul-de-Sac area. In July 2022, an outbreak of gang violence occurred in Port-au-Prince, leaving 89 people dead and over 74 injured.

In December 2023, the U.S. sanctioned four gang leaders, one of whom—Johnson André—was the leader of the 5 Segond gang, which the U.S. Treasury Department identified as being responsible for over 1,000 cases of sexual violence in 2022. Rape—which only became a criminal offense in Haiti in 2005—is being used by gangs as a means of humiliating those living in rival gang neighborhoods. Abortion is illegal in Haiti, so rape victims are legally required to carry any resulting pregnancy to term in a country with one of the highest mortality rates for mothers outside of war zones in Sudan and Yemen.

==== Fuel protests ====
In September 2022, protests erupted, sparked by a governmental decision to eliminate fuel subsidies which caused prices to double overnight. Jimmy Chérizier, the leader of the G9 Family and Allies gang alliance, organized a blockade of the country's largest oil terminal (Varreux). Gangs gunned down prominent figures, including journalists and a politician in October and November. Protests continued even after the lifting of the blockade on 7 November.

== Gang war (since 2023) ==
Clashes as of July 2026 Areas of gang activity

=== 2023 ===
In 2023, the situation continued to escalate, with the last democratically elected officials leaving office, leaving Haiti without an elected government. Four police officers killed by the Vitel'Homme gang in Petion-ville and seven police officers killed by the Savien gang on 25 January in Liancourt led protesting police to storm Henry's residence. The riots ended a few days later. Canada announced on 6 February that they would begin surveillance flights to Haiti in order to monitor the situation in the country. According to leaked American documents in late February, the Wagner Group began to explore pathways and expressed interest in intervening in Haiti.

A series of battles between gangs in early March led to the deaths of 208 people, and kidnappings jumped 72% from the first quarter of the previous year. Doctors, lawyers, and other wealthy members of society were kidnapped and held for ransom. Examples include Jean-Dickens and Abigail Toussaint, a Haitian American couple who were kidnapped on 18 March and later released; Robert Denis, the director of the TV station Canal Bleu kidnapped on 11 April; and Harold Marzouka, the Vice-Consul of Saint Kitts and Nevis and CEO of Haiti Plastics, kidnapped on 15 April. Many victims were killed when ransom demands were not met, leading many to flee the country, further hampering efforts to pull the country out of the crisis. Violence continued into April, with three police officers being killed in an ambush on 9 April by the Ti Makak gang in the Thomassin neighborhood. 13 gang members were burned alive by a mob as they were being detained by police.

On 27 July, the United States ordered its non-essential personnel to leave the country as quickly as possible. This order was given the same day an American nurse and her child were kidnapped, with 80% of the capital reportedly controlled by gangs.

==== UN security force ====
On 30 July, Kenya agreed to lead a multinational peace mission in the country. On 18 September, the feuding G-Pèp and G9 gangs reached an agreement to form a so-called Viv Ansanm ("Live together") coalition. Any hope this inspired was short-lived however, as by 22 September, the Taliban gang of Canaan run by Jeff Larose was leading an attack on the touristic town of Saut-d'Eau at the request of 5 Seconds gang leader Johnson "Izo" Alexandre, resulting in many injuries and at least 12 deaths. The motive for the attack, which lasted several days and spread to Mirebalais, was thought to be related to arms smuggling.

The growing crisis led to discussions of a Kenyan-led police intervention into Haiti, which Kenya had previously offered but which Haiti was at first reluctant to accept. On 2 October 2023, United Nations Security Council resolution 2699 was approved, authorizing the "multinational security support mission" to Haiti, which is the first time an African Union country led a major peacekeeping operation outside of Africa. On 5 October 2023, Kenyan foreign minister Alfred Mutua was replaced by Musalia Mudavadi amid domestic controversy over the plans.

In a 2023 UN report Robert Muggah estimated there could be as many as half a million weapons in Haiti. When interviewed in 2024, he said that "more than 80 percent" of those traced by the "ATF between 2020 and 2022 were made [in] or imported from the U.S."

=== 2024 ===
A UN report issued on 15 January indicated that in 2023 there had been 2,490 kidnappings and 4,789 reported homicides. On 1 February, Joly Germine, a leader of the 400 Mawozo gang, pleaded guilty in a U.S. federal court to smuggling arms such as "AK-47s, AR-15s, an M4 carbine rifle, an M1A rifle, and a .50 caliber rifle, described by the ATF as a military weapon," into Haiti, piloting the operation from a Haitian prison.

On 13 March an American blogger Addison Pierre Maalouf, ignoring the "do not travel" recommendations of the U.S. State Department, was kidnapped by the 400 Mawozo gang while seeking to interview Jimmy Chérizier. He blamed corrupt police officers for the ambush which led to 17 days of captivity and $50,000 in ransom he says was paid to secure his release. According to Maalouf's father, who paid the ransom, pressure brought by Chérizier on gang leader Lanmò Sanjou (literally "la mort sans jour") helped secure the blogger's release.

A surge in gang violence caused significant casualties, with 1,554 deaths and 826 injuries in the first quarter of the year. Gangs used sexual violence as a means of control and punishment, with reports of women being raped during gang invasions of neighborhoods, often after witnessing the murder of their partners. Gangs are also known to force women into exploitative relationships and use the rape of hostages to extort ransoms from families. They are also known for recruiting children.

==== Ousting of Ariel Henry ====
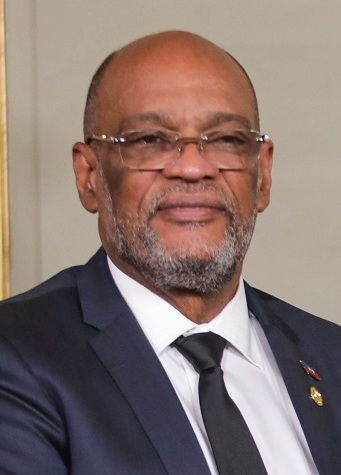
Ariel Henry, who acted as the prime minister from July 2021 to April 2024

Starting in January 2024, after his deportation following release from a US prison, former senator Guy Philippe, led protests demanding the resignation of Ariel Henry. He was aided by the Brigade de sécurité des aires protégées, an armed militia created by the government that had gone rogue. On 26 January, a judge from Kenya's High Court halted the deployment of Kenyan peace-keepers to Haiti, on the grounds that the National Security Council lacked authority to send police officers abroad. The Kenyan government said it would appeal the ruling, offering to circumvent the High Court's earlier ruling. On 25 February 2024, Michel Patrick Boisvert assumed interim leadership of the Haitian government while Prime Minister Henry traveled to Kenya to negotiate the deployment of Kenyan police forces to Haiti.

On 29 February, a wave of violence broke out. Gunfire was directed at the main airport, and many businesses in the area and two police stations were seized, fueling speculation that an alliance between rival gangs was forming to overthrow the government. Chérizier released a video saying that the goal of the operation was to prevent Henry from returning to Haiti. Chérizier was said to have the support of other gangs as part of Viv Ansanm coalition; though that coalition was quick to dissolve, other gangs still launched attacks together with Chérizier's G9 gang. Gangs stormed jails after diversionary attacks on police stations, resulting in thousands of inmates being freed.

As the security situation in Port-au-Prince deteriorated, on 3 March Boisvert issued a state of emergency. More than 160,000 people were displaced within Port-au-Prince, which was effectively under siege by the gang alliance. Looting at the main port put at risk 300 containers filled with foreign aid. On 5 March, with the Port-au-Prince airport shut down by gang attacks, Henry's chartered plane was also prevented from landing in Santo Domingo and was diverted to San Juan, Puerto Rico. Over the next days US military airlifted out its embassy personnel, and the European Union evacuated all diplomatic staff from Haiti. After the 8 March attack on the National Palace, schools and government offices remained closed in the capital amid continuing attacks on police stations, hospitals, and courthouses.

On 11 March, Henry announced that he would resign and that a transitional council (whose membership would be determined in Jamaica at an emergency CARICOM meeting) would select an interim prime minister. The Kenyan government suspended the deployment of peace-keepers until a new Haitian government was in place.

==== Transitional Presidential Council ====
On 13 March, the Pitit Desalin party led by Jean-Charles Moïse withdrew from the transitional council to create its own council, slated to include Guy Philippe, who had called for amnesty for some in the gangs whose actions brought down the Henry government.

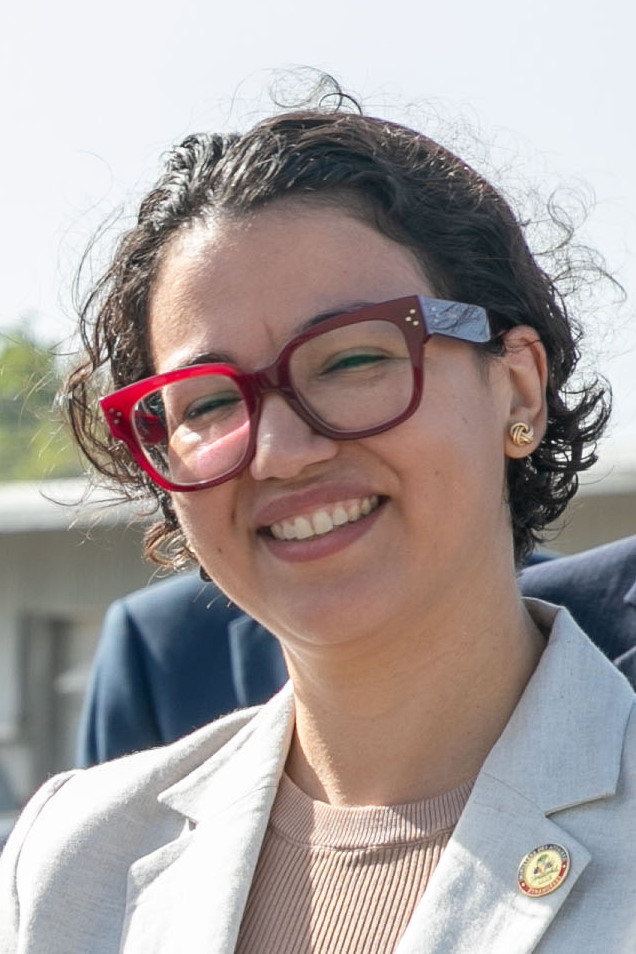
Dominique Dupuy, who resigned from the council after four days

One week later, after encouragement from "a big country", Moïse reversed course and decided to name Emmanuel Vertilaire, on advice from the National Network of Farmers. It was reported that Philippe had lost significant support in Haïti by early April. On 24 March, Dominique Dupuy, who had replaced the only other woman on the council (Marie Ghislaine Mompremier) four days earlier on 20 March, resigned after receiving death threats and becoming the target of misogynistic comments. She was replaced by Smith Augustin.

After weeks of negotiation, a deal was sent to CARICOM on 7 April for a temporary government whose mandate will end on 7 February 2026. One of the council's tasks was to select a prime minister, who could not be one of the members of the council or the provisional government.

On 12 April the government published a decree in Le Moniteur officially creating the transitional council and specifying its mandate. The decree omitted the names of the representatives of the seven parties, subject to government confirmation. The next day, the council rejected the governmental decree and called upon the members of the resigning government to publish the council's original agreement without modification. Differences introduced in the government decree included that individuals are ineligible for appointment to the Council if they have been sanctioned by the United Nations, if they are under criminal indictment or have been found guilty of a crime in any jurisdiction, and that members must support the deployment of the Multinational Security Support Mission in Haiti. On 16 April, the government published a second order modifying the decree to include the names which had initially been proposed by the transitional council.

The initial members of the Transitional Presidential Council (CPT, from its French name Conseil présidentiel de transition) sworn in on 25 April were:

Composition of the transitional presidential council
Member	Party	Member	Party
Edgard Leblanc Fils	30 January; Collective	Smith Augustin	EDE-RED- Historic Compromise (Note: EDE / RED / Historic compromise counts Jovenel Moïse's prime minister Claude Joseph among its leadership, while the 21 December Agreement is close to deposed prime minister Ariel Henry. The private sector refers to allied business associations including, for example, the ADIH.)
Fritz Alphonse Jean	Montana Accord	Leslie Voltaire	Fanmi Lavalas
Laurent Saint-Cyr	Private sector	Louis Gérald Gilles	21 December; Agreement
Emmanuel Vertilaire	Pitit Desalin		

In addition, there were two observers, Frinel Joseph and Régine Abraham.

On 28 May, the Presidential Transitional Council held a meeting to choose the next prime minister. Garry Conille, who was briefly prime minister during the Martelly administration and worked as former UN Special Envoy Bill Clinton's chief of staff, was unanimously designated by the six councillors present.

==== Instability and roadblocks causing medical and food insecurity across the country ====
On 15 March, police entered Delmas in an attempt to capture Chérizier. The next day, they attempted to secure the principal port in Port-au-Prince, which had been closed since 7 March due to the violence. On 17 March, a UNICEF aid container carrying critical items for infants and mothers was looted in the port, while 60% of hospitals nationally were unable to operate due to medicine and fuel shortages. Looting and vandalism at St. Francis de Sales hospital in Port-au-Prince caused damages estimated at US$3 million. Up to 20% of medical staff had left Haiti by the beginning of the year. Even before violence escalated shutting down all but one of the capital's hospitals, Haiti had the worst conditions for childbirth in Latin America and the Caribbean, with only "war-torn countries like Sudan and Yemen" having higher mortality rates.

Gangs raided a power station and four substations, stealing equipment and leaving parts of the capital Port-au-Prince without power. On 18 March, 14 bodies were found after a gang attack in Petion-ville, a wealthy neighborhood. Police came to rescue an administrative judge when his home was attacked. UNICEF executive director Catherine Russell compared the anarchy to the film Mad Max.

On 19 March, Le Nouvelliste reported that outside of the capital, schools and universities remained open and that activity in cities such as Cap-Haïtien, Jacmel, and Jérémie was relatively normal. Throughout the country, prices were rising, with agricultural products spoiling in warehouses. Banks ran out of cash and experienced liquidity problems in several areas, while the health sector and public transportation were also disrupted. Public transportation union leaders painted a grim picture of kidnappings and brigandage on the roads, as armed gangs continued their nearly 3-year-long control of the national highway system, demanding tolls to allow traffic to pass. With the closure of the Port-au-Prince airport, all travellers within the country were forced to use the dangerous roads. Of the 33,000 people who fled the capital in the two weeks following the escalation of violence, 90% did so by bus.

On 22 March, a police union representative said that officers in the capital were unable to cash their paychecks at the state bank. No ships had entered the container port since 5 March, and the sound of gunshots could be heard throughout the capital. According to the WFP, nearly half the population was going hungry, with over 1.6 million on the edge of starvation (IPC-4) with pockets in or near the capital (Croix-des-Bouquets and Cité Soleil) risking a return to the catastrophic (IPC-5) levels at the end of 2022. According to Le Nouvelliste, "one of the worst-hit areas is the Artibonite Valley—the country's bread basket—where gangs took possession of land and stole harvests".

On 27 March, it was announced that the U.S. would provide $10 million worth of surplus helmets, bulletproof vests, weapons, and ammunition to the Haitian National Police, though U.S. funding for the Multinational Security Support was stalled. Also 170 French nationals and 70 others had been evacuated that week by special forces aboard helicopters flown into Fort-de-France for transport on the carrier Tonnerre.

While police were tied up with the 1 April gang attack on the National Palace, fires were set in the administrative building of the nearby Petit Séminaire Collège Saint-Martial. Four cars parked in the courtyard were completely burnt and others vandalised. Computers, refrigerators, mattresses, generators, water purifiers, and solar panels were stolen during the six-hour attack. Two days later, the National Library was pillaged of furniture and the generator damaged. The previous week the École nationale supérieure had been set aflame, and the National School of Arts was looted along with 10 pharmacies and two hospitals.

On 6 April, police were able to regain control of the Magalie, a freighter at the Varreux terminal in Port-au-Prince whose crew had been kidnapped and whose cargo had been looted of 10,000 bags of rice by the 5 Seconds and Taliban gangs two days earlier. Neither the rice nor the crew members were recovered in the operation. The Taliban gang was also reported to have destroyed a police station in the Canaan.

Through 20 May 2024, civilian flights into Toussaint Louverture International Airport remained suspended, though authorities had nationalized space around the perimeter of the airport and torn down 350 buildings to create a security buffer zone. On 12 November, a Spirit Airlines flight attendant was injured by gunfire. The U.S. FAA ordered all air traffic diverted to Cibao International Airport in the Dominican Republic after at least three planes were targeted while landing at Toussaint Louverture.

==== Vigilante action ====
The "bwa kale" movement, which had begun in 2023 when a group of armed men "lynched and set fire to around a dozen men believed to be gang members", continued apace in late March 2024. In one case, on 29 March 2024, two men suspected of buying arms for gangs were taken from police custody and hacked to pieces by a mob in a small town near Mirebalais.

Pierre Espérance, director of the National Human Rights Defense Network in Haiti, expressed concern about the risk of the transitional council giving power to people linked to gangs, drawing attention to vigilante action as a "clear expression of Haitians' revulsion for gangs", and to "rank-and-file police officers [who] are revolting against the chief, who they say is tied to gangs."

==== Sexual violence against children ====
In 2024, Haiti experienced a tenfold increase in sexual violence against children, as reported by the United Nations. UNICEF spokesman James Elder said that armed groups have inflicted severe harm on children, turning their bodies into battlegrounds. Concurrently, escalating armed violence has led to the internal displacement of over half a million children, representing nearly one in eight children nationwide—a 48% rise since September 2023.

==== Multinational intervention ====
The United States pledged $200 million to the international police force approved by the UN and an additional $100 million in humanitarian aid. Canada announced $123 million to support Haiti, including $80.5 million for the mission. As of March 2024, the U.N. indicated that $78 million had been formally pledged, of which $10.8 million had been deposited, by Canada and France.

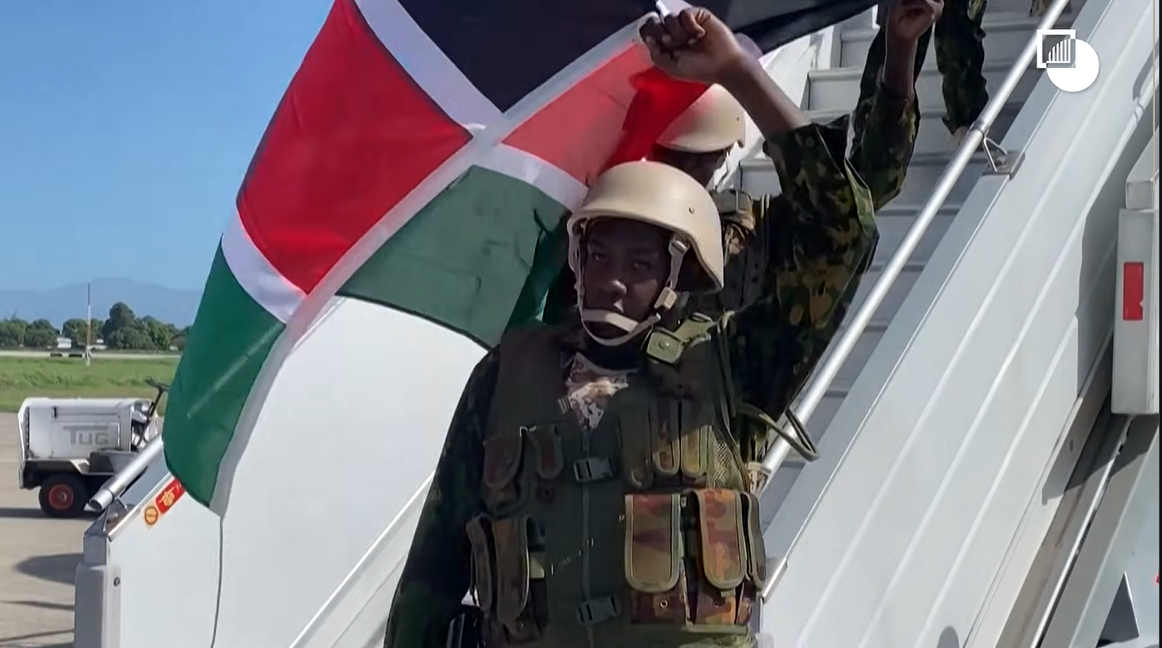
MSS police unit arriving in Port-au-Prince

The US military began flying cargo planes into the Port-au-Prince airport on 23 April and by mid-May had transported over 500 tons of material, including equipment for the Haitian National Police, medical equipment, and food. On 26 June Kenya's first contingent of 400 elite police officers landed in Port-au-Prince's international airport after months of delay. In October the Kenyan officers had been joined by two dozen from Jamaica, but the numbers fell far short of the 2,500 pledged by various countries, including Chad, Benin, Bangladesh and Barbados. Kenyan President William Ruto and Haitian Prime Minister Garry Conille met in Nairobi, and said Kenya would deploy 600 additional officers the next month. They called for more international funding, in addition to the $85 million in pledges to the U.N. for the mission, with $68 million received. The Kenyan commander in Haiti said the fight against the gangs "is winnable" although they still controlled up to 80% of the capital's area, and civilian vigilante groups continued to fight back. In early October the U.N. Security Council extended the mandate of the multinational force, although declined to transform it into a long-term peacekeeping mission.

==== Pont-Sondé massacre ====
The Gran Grif gang, initially armed by politician Prophane Victor and led by Luckson Elan, issued a warning that they would attack residents in Pont-Sondé who had allied themselves with a self-defense group, hindering the gang's toll collection on the road from Port-au-Prince to Cap-Haitien. Arriving in Pont-Sondé by canoe, the gang attack on 3 October killed at least 115 people, and over 6,300 people were displaced.

=== 2025 ===
The security crisis continued to worsen in 2025, by this point the number of homicides in 2024 was already up by 51% compared to the year before. It rose despite the forming of the Viv Ansanm coalition in March 2025 initially lowering the amount of inter-gang violence by 78% in the first five months. A report published by the think tank Global Initiative in 2025 says that the "gangs now function like armed militias, controlling vast swathes of the country." InsightCrime reported 8,100 killings in Haiti in 2025.

The Multinational Security Support Mission (MSS) came under scrutiny by the Kenyan president William Ruto for facing shortages of equipment, funding, and not showing progress towards their goals according to local authorities. He said he would nonetheless fulfill the deployment of all the officers by January 2025.

The Transitional Presidential Council continued to govern alongside acting prime minister Alix Didier Fils-Aimé, who had replaced Garry Conille in November 2024. The position of chairman of the council switched to Fritz Jean in March 2025 and to Laurent Saint-Cyr in August 2025.

On 3 January 2025, a contingent from Guatemala and El Salvador arrived in Port-au-Prince to reinforce the mission.

On 25 February 2025, UN Secretary-General Antonio Guterres announced that the MSS will not transition to a UN peacekeeping force (as was previously done in Haiti), and instead will recommend the creation of a support mission to back the MSS' operations.

On 12 June 2025, the Haitian government resumed domestic flights by Sunrise Airways from Port-au-Prince to Cap-Haïtien, Jacmel, Jérémie, and Les Cayes.

On 9 August 2025, the Haitian government declared a three-month state of emergency due to persistent gang crime; the measure applied to the Ouest department—home of Port-au-Prince—as well as the Centre and Artibonite departments. The move was intended to enable the full mobilization of all state security forces.

==== Gang Suppression Force ====
On 30 September 2025, the United Nations Security Council adopted Resolution 2793 that authorized the transition of the Multinational Security Support mission into the Gang Suppression Force, intended to be a larger force than the MSS with a total of 5,500 personnel. Regarding the need for a new force in Haiti, the UN said the previous Multinational Security Support mission authorized in October 2023 faced "chronic underfunding, insufficient personnel, and limited operational capacity, making it difficult to contain gangs that now control large parts of the capital, Port-au-Prince". It was approved for a 12-month mandate lasting until October 2026. The Gang Suppression Force has asked the Security Council to extend its mandate for two more years until September 2028.

==== Drug trafficking ====
Gangs in Haiti earn their money primarily through extortion at container ports and businesses, similar to amateur gangs in other small countries like El Salvador. Extortion is estimated to account for $60-$75 million of the annual revenue of organized crime in Haiti.

However, this landscape is starting to change as the number of drugs discovered by authorities is increasing. In the past, these seizures would typically be cannabis, but large cocaine shipments were seen in 2025. This is a new development, as data on the amount of cocaine seized in Haiti tends to be minimal (1-5 kilograms per year). Although Haiti has been known as a transshipment point in the maritime cocaine trade, it is often ignored in favor of the Dominican Republic and its ports. However, in July 2025 a record amount of cocaine was apprehended near Île de la Tortue, 1,045 kilograms in total, that was likely destined for the US or Canada. A few weeks later, two Haitians were arrested in Jamaica with 1,350 kg of cannabis. In August, Belgian law enforcement caught a 1,150 kg cocaine shipment in Antwerp that was traced to Haiti, via a transshipment in Kingston. In response, the UNODC delivered several armored vehicles and over 350 sets of ballistic gear to the border police (Police Frontalière d'Haïti) throughout 2025. They also provided high-tech equipment to the Coast Guard.

The United Nations Office on Drugs and Crime issued a "stern warning" in December 2025 about the rise of Haiti as a drug trafficking hub. The increased level of organization among gangs, along with diminished state capacity at every level of the government, is causing this surge in smuggling.

=== 2026 ===
==== Fils-Aimé government ====
On 7 February 2026, Alix Didier Fils-Aimé assumed the position of interim prime minister following the dissolution of the Transitional Presidential Council, making him Haiti's de facto head of state with full powers exercised through the Council of Ministers. Fils-Aimé had been serving as the acting prime minister of Haiti since 11 November 2024, when the Transitional Presidential Council dismissed Garry Conille. He was backed by the United States Embassy prior to assuming the position. In January 2026, a majority of members on the Transitional Presidential Council attempted to remove Fils-Aimé, but the chairman of the council Laurent Saint-Cyr refused to agree. The U.S. government imposed sanctions and visa restrictions on several council members while continuing to support Fils-Aimé. In February 2026, several Haitian political parties including Fanmi Lavalas, PHTK, and EDE signed the National Pact for Stability and the Organization of Elections, which endorsed Fils-Aimé and the Council of Ministers as the sole executive power in Haiti until the next election, with a possible constitutional referendum on election day. Fils-Aimé delivered an address to the nation upon his first day in office, promising a harsher campaign against the gangs, saying "les gangs et ceux qui les soutiennent seront pourchassés, un à un" (the gangs and those who support them will be hunted down, one by one).

In late February 2026, Fils-Aimé attended the 50th Regular Meeting of the Conference of Heads of Government of CARICOM in Saint Kitts and Nevis, where he met US Secretary of State Marco Rubio. On 2 March 2026, the Fils-Aimé government reshuffled its administration with 11 new ministers as part of an effort to put people with more technical competence in government positions.

In April 2026, the first elements of the UN-authorized Gang Suppression Force (GSF) arrived in Haiti, a team of 400 Chadian troops. The GSF was authorized for stronger operations against the gangs compared to the MSS force it replaced, working closely with both the Haitian National Police and the Armed Forces of Haiti. By mid-2026 the force remained only partially deployed, at around 20% capacity according to some accounts. The Haitian government later urged the UN Security Council for a renewal of the GSF's mandate.

The GSF has shown progress in reclaiming territory held by gangs in Port-au-Prince, with police reports showing that 75% of the city is under control of gangs, down from an estimated 90%. He stated that the territorial gains are being made in preparation for the 2026 elections, which were initially scheduled for August but later changed to December for the first round. The National Police and military have also been strengthened, to this end the P4000 program was launched in 2025, aimed at training and recruiting 4,000 police officers within 16 months. In an interview with the Hoover Institution in April 2026, Fils-Aimé expressed his confidence in the GSF, saying "the most important thing is that since 2021, this is the first time that the gangs are on the defensive, they are not on the offensive [...] the paradigm has changed, the state is no longer running, it's the bad guys that are now on the run".

Meanwhile in relatively more stable northern Haiti, the Haitian airline Sunrise Airways inaugurated direct international flights from Cap-Haïtien to Newark Liberty International Airport, and later flights linking Cap-Haïtien to Punta Cana and Santiago de los Caballeros in the Dominican Republic.

== Violence towards the press ==
According to the Committee to Protect Journalists, some reporters have been targeted by protesters. Reuters journalist Robenson Sanon was wounded during the protests in February 2019 but believes that it was accidental during the melees. Journalist Rospide Petion was killed on his way home from the Radio Sans Fin in Port-au-Prince on 10 June 2019 by an unknown gunman. Some correspondents filming protests on 9–10 June 2019 were targeted by both police and the crowds. On 11 October 2019, Néhémie Joseph, another radio journalist critical of the government, was found dead in Mirebalais after receiving death threats. Freelance journalist Vladjimir Legagneur is presumed to have been killed in March 2018 while reporting on gang activity in Grande Ravine.

On 22 October 2024, SOS Journalists and the Association of Haitian Journalists released statements calling upon authorities to take measures to protect journalists threatened by Viv Ansamm.

== Response ==
=== Governments ===
- United States: The U.S. Department of State spokesperson for Western Hemisphere Affairs stated in 2019: "We support the right of all people to demand a democratic and transparent government and to hold their government leaders accountable but there is no excuse for violence. Violence leads to instability, less investment, and fewer jobs." The United States prepared humanitarian assistance to ensure food security in Haiti and called for those responsible for corruption to be held accountable. The State Department urged all U.S. citizens on 30 August 2023 to leave Haiti as soon as possible due to rising violence.

In March 2024, the U.S. airlifted non-essential staff from its embassy and reaffirmed its support for a Kenyan police presence. After the airport in Cap-Haïtien reopened, the US resumed deportations to Haiti on 18 April after a three-month hiatus. Immediately after the publication of the decree creating the Transitional Council on 12 April, President Biden authorized $60 million in aid to the Multinational Security Support Mission in Haiti using the Presidential Drawdown Authority.
According to an official source from the United States Congress, on 6 February 2025, Secretary of State Marco Rubio stated that the United States "will continue to support the mission" and that he had issued a waiver to allow approximately $40 million of security assistance to flow to the MSS mission and the Haitian National Police amid the Trump administration's foreign assistance "pause." In May 2025, the administration designated Viv Ansanm and Gran Grif as Foreign Terrorist Organizations and Specially Designated Global Terrorists. In 20 May testimony before the Senate Foreign Relations Committee, Rubio suggested that the Organization of American States (OAS) could play a larger role in Haiti and potentially coordinate a security mission, asserting that the MSS "alone will not solve this problem." Rubio stated that the Trump administration is "prepared to play a leading role" in supporting the OAS but that buy-in would be necessary from other partners in the region.
On 30 September 2025, the United States, together with Panama, co-sponsored the Security Council resolution that replaced the MSS with a larger Gang Suppression Force (GSF) with the power to arrest suspected gang members. In November 2025, the U.S. sanctioned a high-ranking Haitian official, accusing him of supporting gangs.
In January 2026, after members of the Transitional Presidential Council announced a plan to remove Prime Minister Alix Didier Fils-Aimé, the U.S. embassy warned that it would regard any effort by the unelected council to change the government as an effort to undermine Haiti's stability. Rubio told Fils-Aimé that his continued tenure was important to combat gangs, and the U.S. imposed sanctions and visa revocations on five council members. After the council dissolved on 7 February 2026, the U.S. embassy said it supported Fils-Aimé's leadership.
In August 2026, a State Department official condemned a gang attack in Kenscoff as "savage" and urged the swift deployment of the GSF. In September 2026, the U.S. voted to renew the GSF's mandate.

- Dominican Republic: In response to increasing Haitian immigration, Dominican president Luis Abinader began construction of a separation fence along the border between the two countries in February 2022. In February and March 2024, the Dominican Republic repatriated more than 7,500 Haitian migrants through Ouanaminthe, which has increased insecurity in the northeastern border city. In September 2026, Foreign Minister Víctor Bisonó welcomed the Security Council's six-month extension of the GSF mandate.
- Canada: In December 2022, Canada imposed economic sanctions on Gilbert Bigio—Haiti's richest businessman, who is part of the elite Syrio-Lebanese minority—for his role in "protect[ing] and enabl[ing] the illegal activities of the armed criminal gangs".
- Mexico: Foreign Minister Alicia Bárcena condemned the violence in Haiti and said that the solution must come from within the country and without external interference.
- Venezuela: President Nicolás Maduro called for an "integral support" to Haiti, including in the economic and social scenarios.
- Jamaica: In September 2026, the Jamaican government welcomed the renewal of the GSF mandate and urged the international community to back it.
- United Kingdom: Following the September 2026 vote, the UK said it hoped the GSF could bring security and stability and pave the way to credible elections.

=== Intergovernmental organizations ===
- CARICOM: In 2019, CARICOM expressed concern "about the continuing violent protests in Haiti, [...] the loss of life, property, [and the] destruction of infrastructure". It called for "constructive dialogue". In 2024, they planned an emergency meeting for 11 March in Jamaica.
- Organization of American States: In 2019, Secretary General Luis Almagro called for actors to respect the democratic process. In September 2026, thirty-two active OAS member states issued a joint statement calling on the UN Security Council to renew the mandate of the Gang Suppression Force.
- United Nations: In 2019, United Nations Mission for Justice Support in Haiti called for "constructive and inclusive dialogue". In October 2022, the United Nations singled out Chérizier for sanctions among the gang leaders but did not sanction Joseph Wilson, leader of 400 Mawozo; "Izo" Johnson André, leader of the Village de Dieu gang Five Seconds; Renel Destina, leader of the Grand Ravine gang; or Kempes Sanon, leader of the Belair gang. In December 2023, Joseph Wilson, Johnson André, Renel Destina, and Vitel'Homme Innocent (Kraze Barye gang) were likewise sanctioned. In March 2024 the United Nations Secretary-General Antonio Guterres called for urgent action, particularly in providing financial support for a multinational security support mission, to restore law and order in Haiti. According to a report by the UN's International Organization for Migration 13,000 Haitian migrants were returned to the country by its neighbors in March 2024—an increase of 46 percent from February. The UNHRC has called for states to stop returning migrants given the insecurity.

On 30 September 2025, the United Nations Security Council adopted Resolution 2793, transforming the Multinational Security Support Mission into a Gang Suppression Force of up to 5,550 personnel. On 29 September 2026, the Council adopted Resolution 2829 by 12 votes to none, with China, Pakistan and Russia abstaining, extending the GSF mandate until 31 March 2027. The resolution also noted a 27 July 2026 agreement between Haiti and the GSF confirming the force's legal personality. The GSF had been expected to reach 5,500 personnel between April and October 2026 but remained short of that goal. China's delegate cautioned against treating the crisis primarily as a security problem.

== See also ==
- 2004 Haitian coup d'état
- Anti-Duvalier protest movement
- Democracy in the Americas
- Elections in Haiti
- Timeline of gang-related events in Haiti
