= 2024 in the Caribbean =

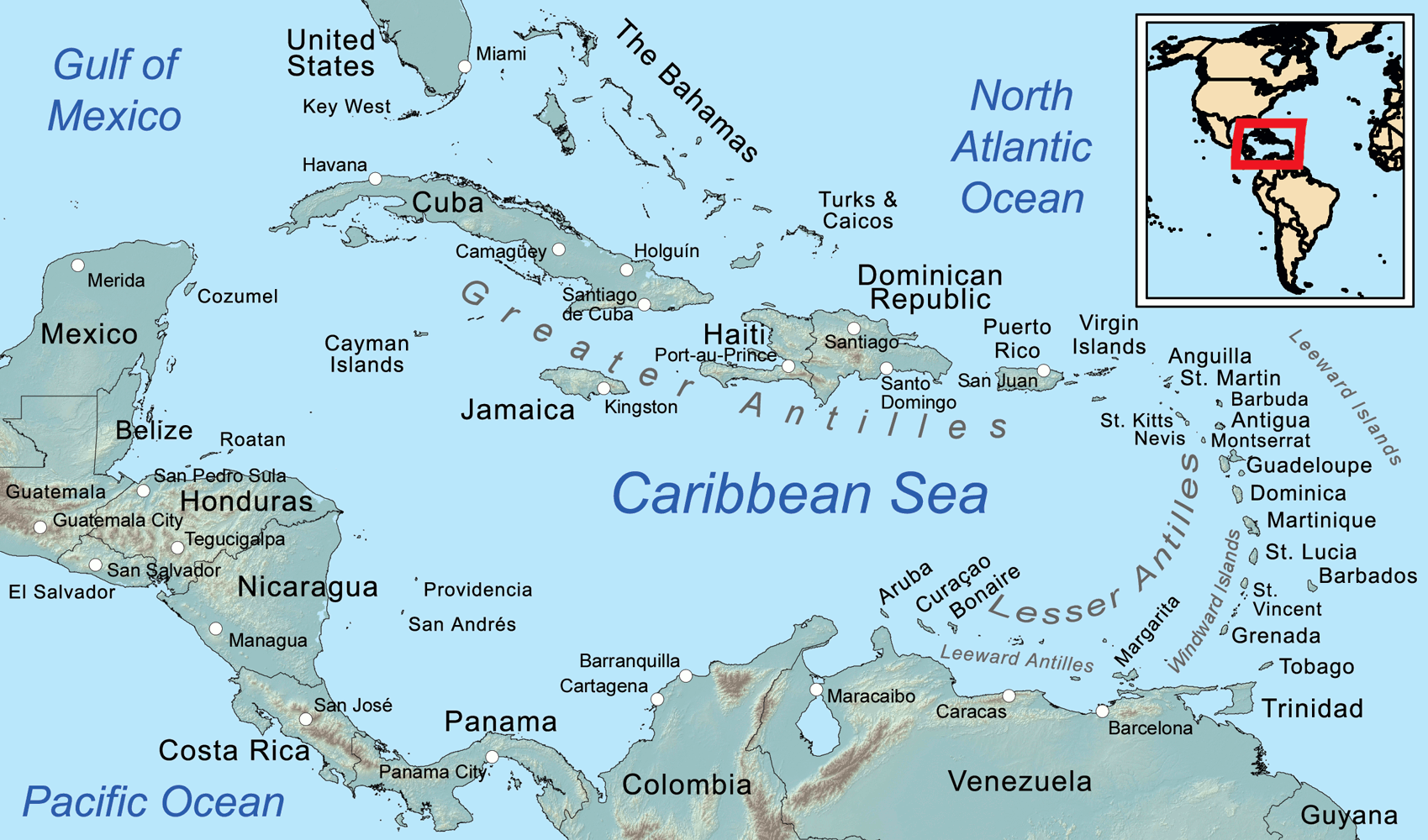
the Caribbean, a subregion of the Americas that includes the Caribbean Sea and its islands

The following lists events that happened during 2024 in the Caribbean.

== Sovereign states ==
=== Cuba ===
(Cuba)

- First Secretary of the Central Committee of the Communist Party of Cuba: Miguel Díaz-Canel (since 19 April 2021)
- President of Cuba: Miguel Díaz-Canel (since 2019)
  - Vice-president: Salvador Valdés Mesa (since 2019)
- Prime Minister: Manuel Marrero Cruz (since 2019)

=== Dominica ===
(Dominica)

- President: Charles Savarin (2013-2023); Sylvanie Burton (2 October onwards)
- Prime Minister: Roosevelt Skerrit (since August 8, 2004)

=== Dominican Republic ===
(Dominican Republic)

- President of the Dominican Republic: Luis Abinader (starting 2020)
- Vice-president Raquel Peña de Antuña (starting 2020)

=== Haiti ===
(Haiti)

- President of Haiti:
  - Ariel Henry (2021–2024)
  - Edgard Leblanc Fils (2024)
  - Leslie Voltaire (2024–2025)
- Acting Prime Minister:
  - Ariel Henry (2021–2024)
  - Michel Patrick Boisvert (2021–2024)
  - Garry Conille (2024)
  - Alix Didier Fils-Aimé (2024–present)

=== Trinidad and Tobago ===
(Trinidad and Tobago)

- President of Trinidad and Tobago: Christine Kangaloo (since 2023)
- Prime minister of Trinidad and Tobago: Keith Rowley (since 2015)

== Commonwealth Realms ==
(United Kingdom)

=== Antigua and Barbuda ===
(Antigua and Barbuda)

- Monarch: Charles III (2022–present)
- Governor-General: Rodney Williams (2014–present)
- Prime Minister: Gaston Browne (2014–present)

=== The Bahamas ===
(The Bahamas)

- Monarch: Charles III (2022–present)
- Governor-General: Cynthia A. Pratt (2023–present)
- Prime Minister: Philip Davis (2021–present)

=== Barbados ===
(Barbados)

- President: Sandra Mason (2021–2025)
- Prime Minister: Mia Mottley (2018–present)

=== Grenada ===
(Grenada)

- Monarch: Charles III (2022–present)
- Governor-General: Dame Cécile La Grenade (2013–present)
- Prime Minister: Dickon Mitchell (2021–present)

=== Jamaica ===
(Jamaica)

- Monarch: Charles III (2022–present)
- Governor-General: Patrick Allen (2009–present)
- Prime Minister: Andrew Holness (2016–present)
- Chief Justice: Bryan Sykes (2018–present)

=== Saint Kitts and Nevis ===
(Saint Kitts and Nevis)

- Monarch: Charles III (2022–present)
- Governor-General: Marcella Liburd (2023–present)
- Prime Minister: Terrance Drew (2022–present)
- Speaker: Lanien Blanchette (2022–present)

=== Saint Lucia ===
(Saint Lucia)

- Monarch: Charles III (2022–present)
- Governor-General: Errol Charles (2024–present; acting since 2021)
- Prime Minister: Philip J. Pierre (2021–present)

=== Saint Vincent and the Grenadines ===
(Saint Vincent and the Grenadines)

- Monarch: Charles III (2022–present)
- Governor General: Susan Dougan (2019–present)
- Prime Minister: Ralph Gonsalves (2001–present)

== Dependencies ==
=== British overseas territories ===
(United Kingdom)

==== Anguilla ====
(Anguilla)

- Governor of Anguilla: Julia Crouch (since 2023)
- Premier of Anguilla: Ellis Webster (since 2020)

==== Bermuda ====
Bermuda is located in the Atlantic Ocean and is included in the UN geoscheme for North America.

- Governor of Bermuda: Rena Lalgie (2020–2025)
- Premier: Edward David Burt (since 2017)

==== British Virgin Islands ====
(British Virgin Islands)

- Governor of the Virgin Islands:
  - John Rankin (2021–2024)
  - Daniel Pruce (2024–present)
- Deputy Governor of the British Virgin Islands: David Archer
- Premier: Natalio Wheatley (2022–present)

==== Cayman Islands ====
(Cayman Islands)

- Governor of the Cayman Islands: Jane Owen (2023–present)
- Premier: Julianna O'Connor-Connolly (2023–2025)

==== Montserrat ====
(Montserrat)

- Governor of Montserrat:
  - Sarah Tucker (2022–2025)
- Premier: Easton Taylor-Farrell (since 2019)

==== Turks and Caicos Islands ====
Turks and Caicos Islands are located in the Atlantic Ocean, although the United Nations groups them with the Caribbean

- Governor Nigel Dakin (since 2019)
- Premier:
  - Sharlene Cartwright-Robinson (until February 20)
  - Washington Misick (starting February 20)

=== France ===
(France)

==== Guadeloupe ====
- Governor: Philippe Gustin (since 2018)

==== Martinique ====
- President of the Assembly of Martinique: Claude Lise (since 2015)

==== Saint Barthélemy ====
- President of Territorial Council: Xavier Lédée (since April 3, 2022)

==== Saint Martin ====
- Prefect Anne Laubies (since 2015)
- President of Territorial Council Louis Mussington (since 2022)
  - First Vice President Alain Richardson (since 2022)

=== Kingdom of the Netherlands ===
(Netherlands)

==== Aruba ====
(Aruba)

- Governor: Alfonso Boekhoudt (2017–present)
- Prime Minister: Evelyn Wever-Croes (2017–2025)

==== Curaçao ====
(Curaçao)

- Monarch – Willem-Alexander (2013–present)
- Governor – Lucille George-Wout (2013–present)
- Prime Minister – Gilmar Pisas (2021–present)

==== Sint Maarten ====
(Sint Maarten)

- Governor of Sint Maarten:
  - Eugene Holiday (since 2010)
  - Ajamu Baly (since 2022)
- Interim Prime Minister of Sint Maarten: Silveria Jacobs (since 2020)

==== Caribbean Netherlands ====
Bonaire, Sint Eustatius, and (Saba (island)) Saba

=== United States ===
The (United States)

==== Puerto Rico ====
(Puerto Rico)

- Governor of Puerto Rico
  - Pedro Pierluisi (since 2021)
- Resident Commissioner of Puerto Rico: Jenniffer González (since 2017)

==== United States Virgin Islands ====
(United States Virgin Islands)

- Governor: Albert Bryan (since 2019)
  - Lt. Governor: Tregenza Roach (since 2019)

== Holidays ==
- Public holidays in Antigua and Barbuda
- Public holidays in Bermuda
- Public holidays in Cuba
- Public holidays in Haiti
- Public holidays in Saint Kitts and Nevis
- Public holidays in Curaçao

== See also ==
- 2020s
- 2024 in politics and government
- 2020s in political history
- 2024 Atlantic hurricane season
- Caribbean Community
- List of state leaders in the Caribbean in 2024
- Organization of American States
