= Laurent Saint-Cyr =

Haitian politician

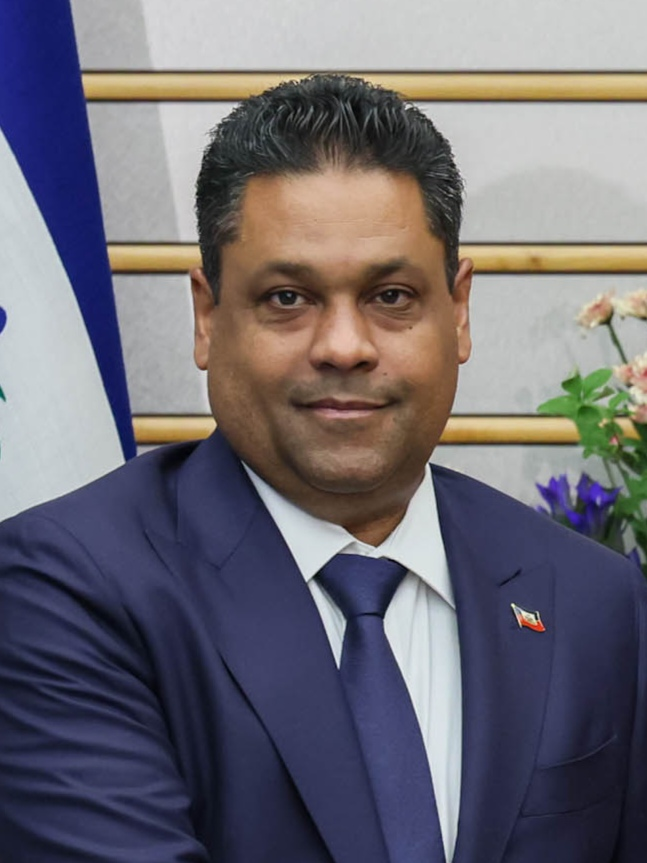
- Saint-Cyr in 2025

4th Chairman of the Transitional Presidential Council
- In office 7 August 2025 – 7 February 2026
- Prime Minister: Alix Didier Fils-Aimé (acting)
- Preceded by: Fritz Jean
- Succeeded by: Office abolished

Member of the Transitional Presidential Council
- In office 25 April 2024 – 7 February 2026
- Prime Minister: Michel Patrick Boisvert (acting); Garry Conille (acting); Alix Didier Fils-Aimé (acting)

Personal details
- Party: Independent
- Education: Yale Jackson School of Global Affairs

Laurent Saint-Cyr (French pronunciation: [lɔʁɑ̃ sɛ̃ siʁ]) is a Haitian politician and businessman who served as the 4th and final Chairman of the Transitional Presidential Council of Haiti from 7 August 2025 to 7 February 2026. He was a member of the council representing the private sector and has previously worked in the insurance industry.

== Biography ==
Saint-Cyr is a member of Haiti's Mulatto minority. Saint-Cyr is a wealthy businessman and has served in the insurance industry in Haiti for many years. He also served as the president of the American Chamber of Commerce in Haiti and as president of the Haitian Chamber of Commerce and Industry.

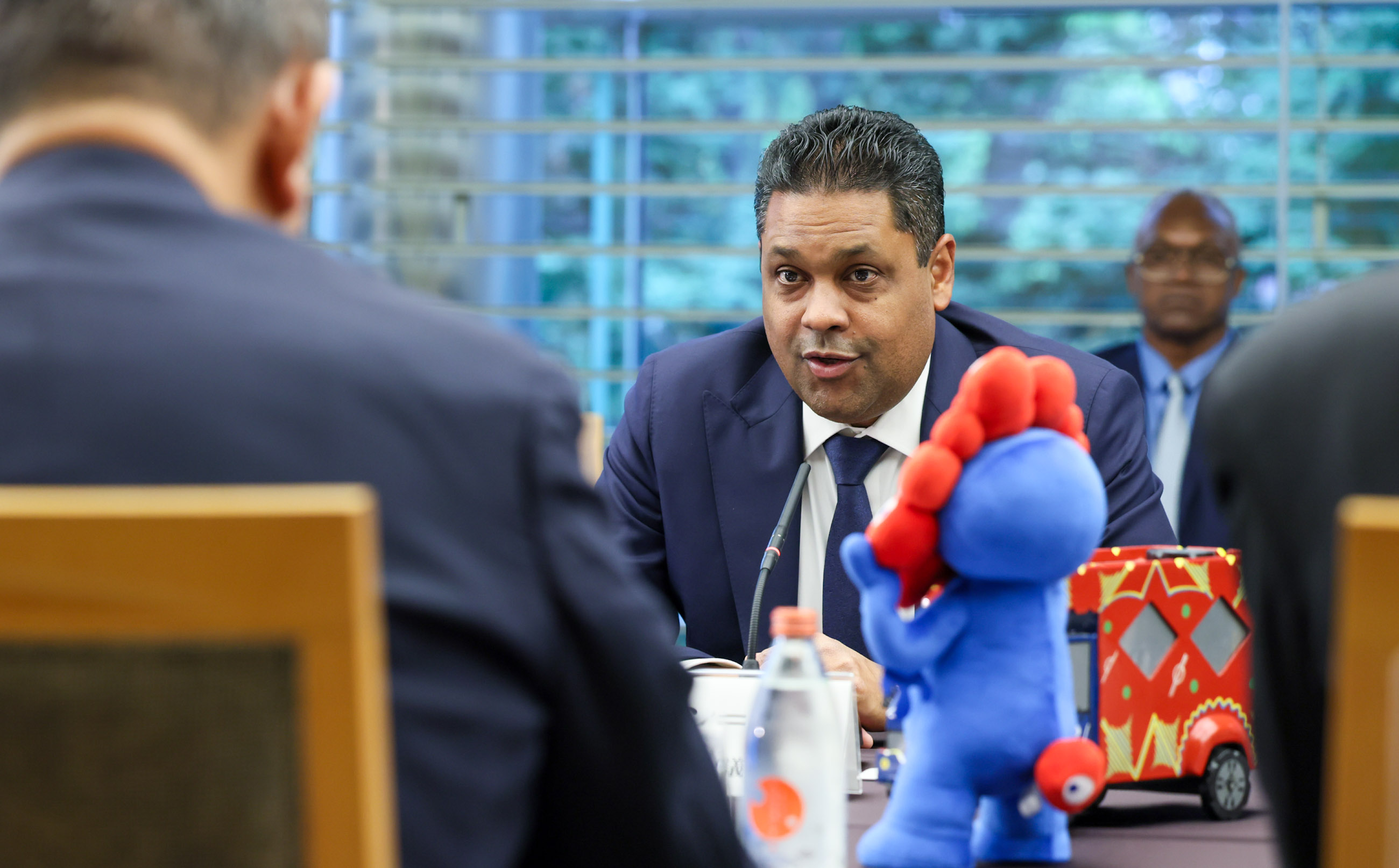
Laurent Saint-Cyr meeting Japanese Prime Minister Shigeru Ishiba in Tokyo, October 2025

Saint-Cyr served on the High Council of Transition, which aimed to promote national dialogue and the organization of elections, from 2023 to 2024. In April 2024, he was named a member of the Transitional Presidential Council, the body temporarily acting as head of state, representing the private sector. In September, he became the inaugural peace fellow at the Yale Jackson School of Global Affairs. On 7 August 2025, Saint-Cyr succeeded Fritz Jean as chairman of the Transitional Council, marking the first time that both the head of council and the head of government of Haiti were led by members of the private sector. He was inaugurated at the Villa d'Accueil in Port-au-Prince amidst threats from gang leader Jimmy Chérizier to overthrow the government. A United Nations-supported force reported the thwarting of several plots to "disrupt national stability and render the country ungovernable" on the day of his inauguration, while "bursts of gunfire" were heard during his transition to office. On 23 January 2026, Saint-Cyr refused to sign and publish the motion on Le Moniteur that would have removed acting Prime Minister Alix Didier Fils-Aimé after a majority of the council voted in favor of the resolution. His term expired on 7 February 2026, and power was handed over to Fils-Aimé.

Political offices
Preceded by Fritz Jean	Chairman of the Transitional Presidential Council; 2025–2026	Council disestablished
