= Transitional Presidential Council =

Collegial head of state exercising the powers and duties of the president of Haiti

- Conseil présidentiel de transition
- Presidential standard of Haiti

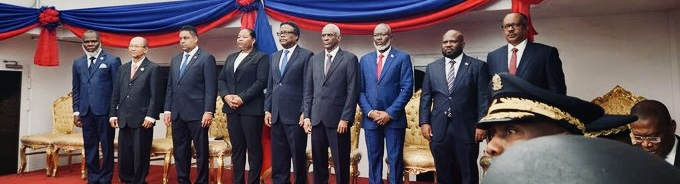
- Members of the Transitional Presidential Council following the installation ceremony on 25 April 2024

Agency overview
- Formed: 12 April 2024, sworn in on 25 April 2024
- Preceding agency: President of Haiti
- Superseding agency: Provisional Electoral Council (CEP)
- Type: Transitional government
- Status: Dissolved (since 7 February 2026)
- Headquarters: National Palace, Port-au-Prince, Haiti
- Agency executive: Laurent Saint-Cyr, Chairman
- Key document: Decree of Special Issue No. 14, Volume 179 ("Décret Portant Création du Conseil Présidentiel de Transition")

The Transitional Presidential Council (TPC; French: Conseil présidentiel de transition [kɔ̃sɛj pʁezidɑ̃sjɛl də tʁɑ̃zisjɔ̃]; Haitian Creole: Konsèy Prezidansyèl Tranzisyon) was a temporary body constituted by the Council of Ministers on 12 April 2024 and sworn in at the National Palace on 25 April to exercise the powers and duties of the president of Haiti either until an elected president is inaugurated or until 7 February 2026, whichever came first. The council dissolved as scheduled after no presidential election was held.

== Background ==
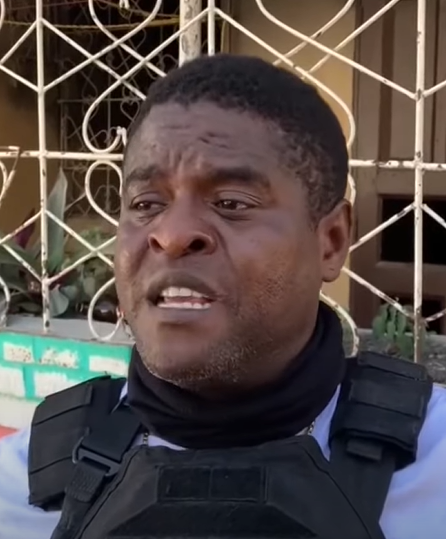
Jimmy "Barbecue" Chérizier (pictured) led demands for change of the government, but later threatened to attack any person who accepted appointment to the newly-formed TPC.

The gradual disintegration of Haitian state institutions during the Haitian crisis led to calls for acting prime minister Ariel Henry to step aside and surrender the de facto head of state functions. The demands were led by Jimmy "Barbecue" Chérizier, a former policeman who heads a coalition of gangs in Haiti, and Guy Philippe, a former senator and convict. Henry was seen as illegitimate since he took over after the 7 July 2021 assassination of president Jovenel Moïse, and had repeatedly postponed the general elections which he had promised to organize. On 11 March 2024, Henry announced that he would resign and that a transitional council (whose membership would be determined in Jamaica at an emergency CARICOM meeting) would select an interim prime minister.

On 3 April 2024, the transitional presidential council set up at the CARICOM meeting on 11 March had finalized its provisional list of representatives, who were appointed by the Council of Ministers on 16 April.

After weeks of negotiation, a deal was sent to CARICOM on 7 April for a temporary government whose mandate will end on 7 February 2026. One of the council's tasks is to elect an acting prime minister, who cannot already be a member of the transitional council or the provisional government. The transitional council was officially created by a governmental decree published in Le Moniteur on 12 April. The names of the nine members of the TPC were published on 16 April, and they were sworn in at the National Palace on 25 April amidst the sounds of automatic gunfire. Prior to the announcement of Ariel Henry's resignation and the inauguration of the TPC, Michel Patrick Boisvert was named acting prime minister by the Council of Ministers.

== History ==
On 30 April 2024, Edgard Leblanc Fils was named chairman of the TPC, and Fritz Bélizaire was designated as the prime minister by a majority of four votes, although the latter choice was contested within the council. As a result, the council members agreed to have the chairmanship being rotated every five months among Fils, Louis Gérald Gilles, Leslie Voltaire and Smith Augustin. In addition, it also set up a requirement of five votes instead of four to form a majority. The council later started accepting submissions for the position of prime minister from 13–17 May. In late May 2024, the council extended the tenure of acting prime minister Michel Patrick Boisvert for another month, and on 27 May six of the seven members with voting rights chose former UN special envoy and former prime minister Garry Conille as his successor, discarding the earlier vote that selected Bélizaire. Conille and members of the council met several times after his swearing-in, agreeing on names of 13 ministers to be a part of his cabinet, with the ministers being named on 11 June 2024. The council and the new government later agreed to replace the director-general of the Haitian National Police. On 7 October 2024, Voltaire was named to replace Fils as president of the council.

On 2 October 2024, an official anti-corruption unit of the government recommended judicial review of three members of the Transitional Council—Smith Augustin, Gérald Gilles, and Emmanuel Vertilaire—for abuse of function, bribery, and passive corruption.

The council removed Conille as acting prime minister in November 2024, replacing him with businessman Alix Didier Fils-Aimé. Several council members unsuccessfully attempted to remove Fils-Aimé in January 2026, drawing condemnation from the U.S.

The council dissolved on 7 February 2026, with no successor. Radio France Internationale remarked that the prospects of a political transition were remote. The council transferred all remaining powers to prime minister Fils-Aimé, who was left as the only politician with executive power in Haiti.

== Composition ==
Under the terms of the decree of 12 April 2024, the Transitional Presidential Council consists of seven voting and two non-voting members. The voting members include one representative from each of four political party coalitions (Accord du 30 août 2021, Accord du 21 décembre 2022, Collectif des Partis politiques, and Compromis Historique/RED/EDE), two political parties (Fanmi Lavalas and Platfòm Pitit Desalin), and "the private sector". The non-voting members include one representative from civil society and one representative from "the interfaith community". On 16 April, the Primature confirmed the appointment of the nine members nominated by the Transitional Presidential Council in Kingston.

=== Qualifications ===
Members of the TPC needed to be eligible for the presidency as established under Article 135 of the Constitution of Haiti and were disqualified from standing for the presidency in the planned election. Differences introduced in the decree include that individuals are ineligible for appointment to the council if they have been sanctioned by the United Nations, if they are under criminal indictment or have been found guilty of a crime in any jurisdiction, or if they oppose the introduction of the Multinational Security Support Mission in Haiti. Similarly, the government added in article 5 that all members must pursue the accelerated deployment of the international security force.

=== Members ===
Composition of TPC
Voting member	Party / Group (Note: EDE / RED / Historic compromise counts Jovenel Moïse's prime minister Claude Joseph among its leadership, while 21 December Agreement is close to deposed prime minister Ariel Henry. The private sector refers to allied business associations including, for example, the ADIH.)
Fritz Jean	Inite / Montana Accord
Leslie Voltaire	Fanmi Lavalas
Edgard Leblanc Fils	Struggling People's Organization/30 January Collective
Smith Augustin	EDE/RED-Historic Compromise
Laurent Saint-Cyr (Chairman)	Private sector
Louis Gérald Gilles	21 December Agreement
Emmanuel Vertilaire	Platfòm Pitit Desalin
Observer	Party / Group
Regine Abraham	Rally for a National Agreement (REN)
Frinel Joseph	Religious sector

== Chairman ==
No.	Portrait	Name (Birth–Death)	Term of office			Party	Ref.
No.	Portrait	Name (Birth–Death)	Took office	Left office	Time in office	Party	Ref.
1		Edgard Leblanc Fils (born 1955)	30 April 2024	7 October 2024	160 days	OPL	
2		Leslie Voltaire (born 1949)	7 October 2024	7 March 2025	151 days	FL	
3		Fritz Jean (born 1956)	7 March 2025	7 August 2025	153 days	Inite	
4		Laurent Saint-Cyr (born Unknown)	7 August 2025	7 February 2026	184 days	None (Private sector)	

== Authority and mandate ==
Under the terms of the decree of 12 April, the Transitional Presidential Council exercised functions of the office of president until such time as a new president was elected and inaugurated. Its mandate to act concluded on 7 February 2026. The TPC's authority extends to the appointment of an acting prime minister and government and Henry has agreed to resign from the office of prime minister at such time as the TPC designates someone else to hold the office.

== Reactions to establishment ==
=== Domestic ===
The drafters of the agreement rejected the governmental decree on 13 April and called upon the members of the resigning government to publish the original agreement without modification. Reactions within Haiti to the announcement of the TPC were mixed, with some Haitians questioning its constitutional legitimacy. Shortly after the council's announcement, Jacky Lumarque, rector of Université Quisqueya, described the council as not being a "Haitian-led" solution, calling it a "snake of seven heads". He called for a judge of the Court of Cassation to be empowered as unitary acting president, instead.

Jimmy "Barbecue" Chérizier said his forces would attack any person who accepted appointment to the council. Chérizier also invoked a traditional Haitian battle cry to describe the fate that would befall councilors: "Cut off their heads and burn down their houses". Chérizier earlier objected to the lack of input his federation, the Revolutionary Forces of the G9 Family and Allies, had had in governance transition talks. He also entered into an alliance with another federation of gangs, G-Pèp, to organize plans for armed resistance to any entry of foreign peacekeepers into the country as part of a future transitional arrangement.

Camille LeBlanc, former Haitian minister of justice, said he welcomed the creation of the council but doubted the ability of such a body to resolve Haiti's political impasse.

=== Foreign ===
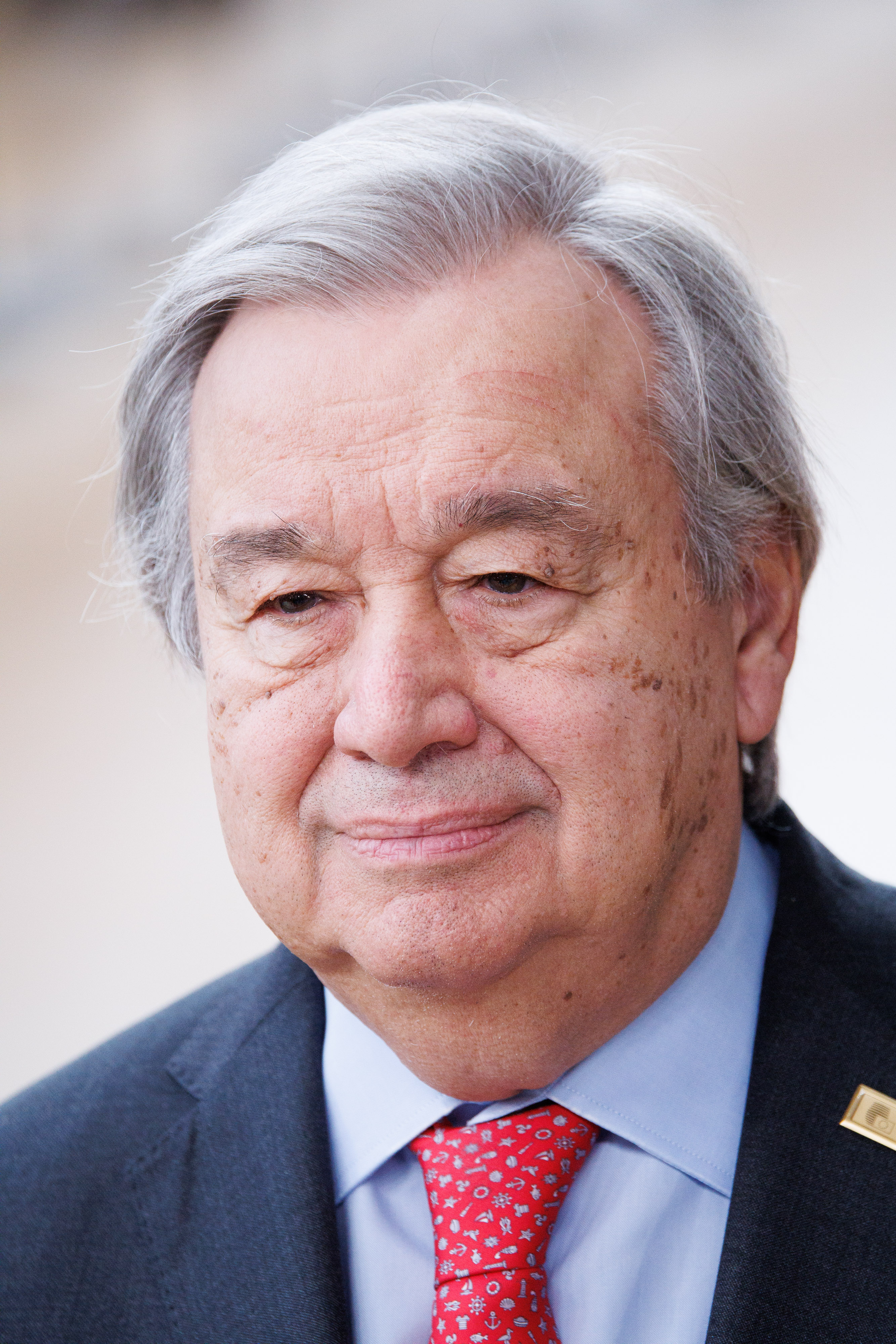
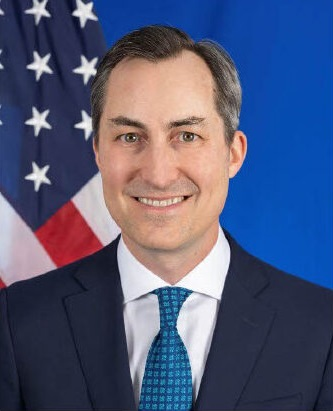
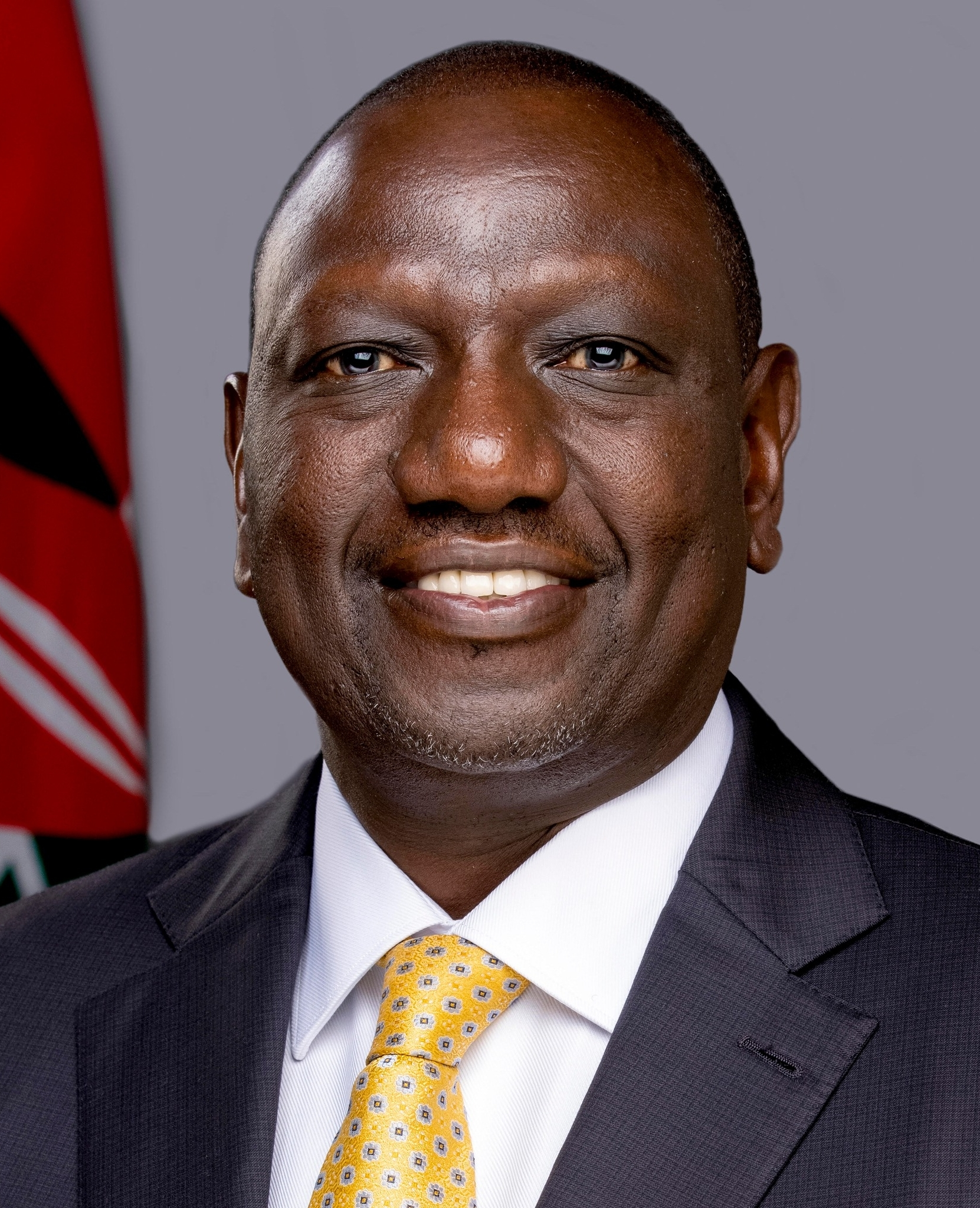
UN secretary-general António Guterres, U.S. State Department spokesman Matthew Miller, and President of Kenya William Ruto each welcomed the creation of the TPC on behalf of their respective nations and organizations.

In an official statement, United Nations secretary-general António Guterres said he "welcomed" the creation of the Transitional Presidential Council and urged "all Haitian stakeholders to continue making progress in putting in place transitional governance arrangements". The Caribbean Community welcomed the creation of the TPC saying it was a "Haitian owned formula for governance that will take the troubled country through elections to the restoration of the lapsed state institutions and constitutional government".

The United States Department of State stated the U.S. "welcomes" the creation of the TPC and "commends Haitian leaders for making tough compromises to move toward democratic governance via free and fair elections". President of Kenya William Ruto welcomed the creation of the TPC, writing on social media that "Kenya expresses confidence that the new political leadership will lay a strong foundation for resolution of the crisis in Haiti, restoration of security, afford the Haitian people a political transition and usher in sustainable peace and development".

In a press release issued 14 April, Louise Mushikiwabo of l'Organisation internationale de la Francophonie "commended" the creation of the Transitional Presidential Council. On 15 April, the European Union, through the European External Action Service, said it was "crucial that the TPC is formally appointed without further delay by the outgoing government of Prime Minister Ariel Henry".

== See also ==
- Federal Council (Switzerland) – collective head of state
- Presidency of Yugoslavia
- Presidency of Bosnia and Herzegovina
- Transitional Sovereignty Council – collective head of state of Sudan
- Presidential Council (Libya)
- National Council of Government (Uruguay) – former collegial executive of Uruguay

== Bibliography ==
- "Décret pourtant création du conseil présidentiel de transition" (PDF). Le Moniteur: Journal officiel de la République d'Haïti. 179 (14). Port-au-Prince. 12 April 2024.
- "Errata: Arrêté nommant les membre du Conseil présidentiel de transition" (PDF). Le Moniteur: Journal officiel de la République d'Haïti. 179 (15). Port-au-Prince. 16 April 2024.
