= Brigade for the Security of Protected Areas =

Armed force set up in Haiti

The Brigade for the Security of Protected Areas (French: Brigade de Sécurité des Aires Protégées; Haitian Creole: Brigad Sekirite Zòn Pwoteje yo) is an armed paramilitary force set up by Haiti's Environmental Ministry. It's said to be an "ally" to Guy Philippe.

As of mid-April 2025, there were no indications of integrating the force into the Haitian Security apparatus. With Haiti’s Transitional Presidential Council calling for its integration. The group originally founded by former Environment Minister Pierre Simon Georges under the Moïse presidency. With the force being accused of illegal activities and badly regulated. Originally intended for environmental protection, of protected areas, has since become involved in the Haitian Gang war. With an spokesman saying "We, the BSAP agents, are mostly former military personnel. We are well-versed in various combat tactics" and "We are determined to respond to the call issued by the Presidential Transition Council, because it is crucial for the state [country’s officials] to regain control over the security situation." The group being accused of having previously planned a coup. Its official size is 100 members and an $1.65 million budget. With an estimated actual size of 900. With 6,000 self-claimed members, according to "senior Brigade agents". Integration of the Brigade into the Haitian security forces began during September 2026.
