= Fritz Bélizaire =

Haitian politician

Minister of Sports
- In office 2006–2011
- President: René Préval

Fritz Bélizaire (French pronunciation: [fʁits belizɛʁ]) is a Haitian politician and civil engineer who was once nominated by four of the seven parties on 2024 April to May of the Transitional Presidential Council to act as Prime Minister of Haiti. Before being nominated, he was the Minister of Youth and Sports from 2006 to 2011 under President René Préval and as an executive in the Ministry of Public Works, Transportation and Communications. Bélizaire has been described as "little known", but was praised by Edgard Leblanc Fils, who was chosen the same day by the Transitional Presidential Council to be its president. Though designated by a majority, the choice was contested within the council. As a result, the "Indissoluble Majority Bloc" (BMI), composed of Smith Augustin, Emmanuel Vertilaire, Louis Gérald Gilles and Edgard Leblanc Fils, agreed to respect the procedure laid out in the 3 April 2024 agreement, thereby giving the other sectors a chance to make nominations. The council later started re-accepting submissions for the position of Prime Minister from 13–17 May, and on 27 May six of the seven members chose former prime minister Garry Conille as his successor, discarding the earlier vote that selected Bélizaire.
