= National Library of Haiti =

Library in Port-au-Prince, Haiti

Coordinates: 18°32′48″N 72°20′32″W

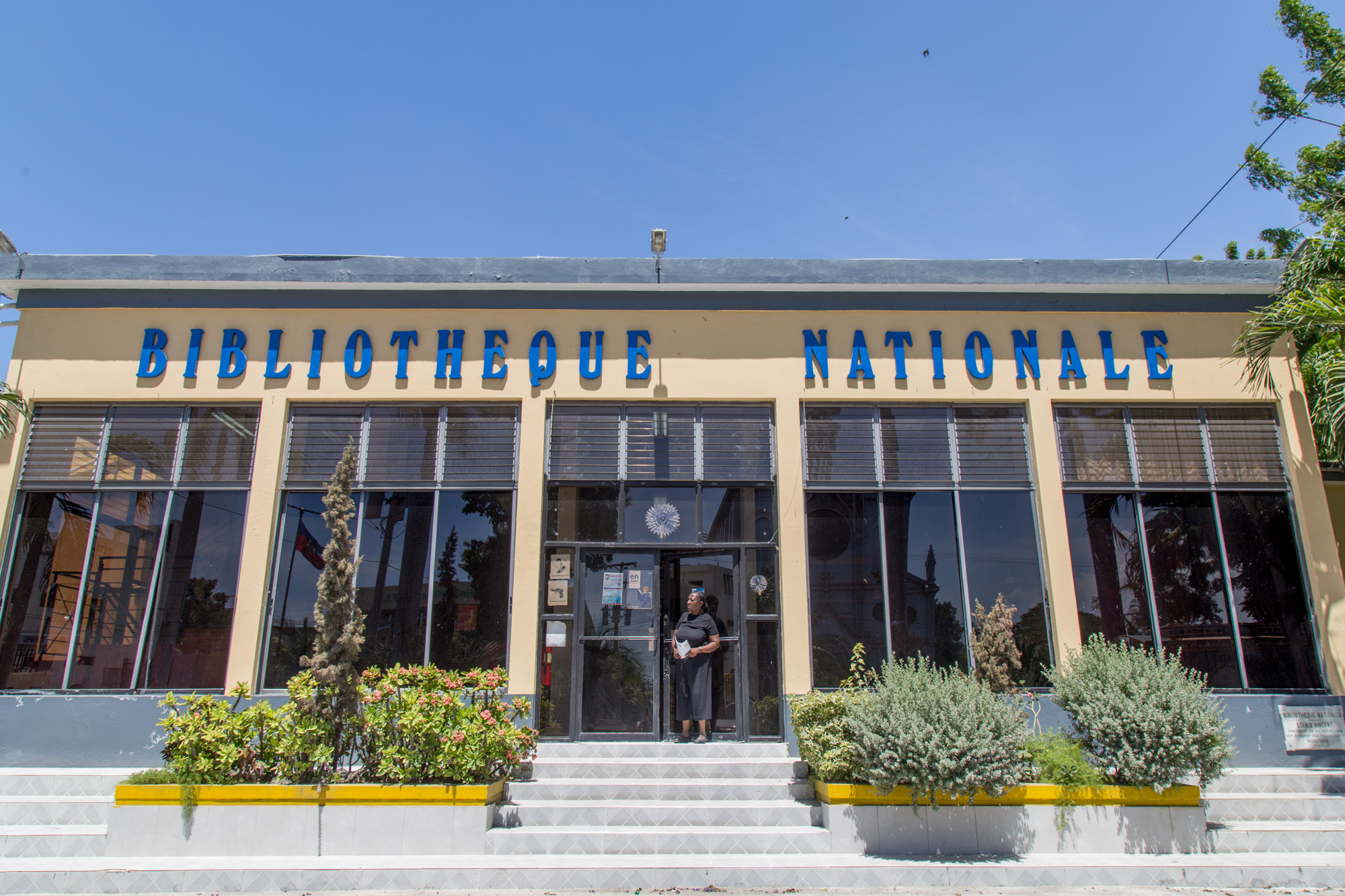
- Location: 193, rue du Centre Port-au-Prince, Haiti
- Type: National library, Public library and Bibliographic Agency
- Established: 1939

Collection
- Items collected: Books, historical documents
- Size: Approx. 26,000 vols. (2009)
- Legal deposit: Since 1984

Access and use
- Population served: 2.143 million (2010)

Other information
- Director: Dangelo Neard

The National Library of Haiti (BNH; French: Bibliothèque nationale d'Haïti) is Haiti's legal deposit library, with a collection of approximately 26,000 volumes. It is located in the capital, Port-au-Prince and is the principal library of the city. The current head of the library is Dangelo Neard.

== Early history ==
The first Haitian National Library was established in 1825, during the presidency of Jean-Pierre Boyer (1818-1843). A cabinet was purchased for the library for 75 gourdes (one Haitian gourde=approx. $20). Later that year about 936 gourdes were spent for the purchase of 444 volumes ordered by Dr. François Fournier de Pescay. This library may have been destroyed during the 1860s, when political clashes saw the destruction of many items of cultural significance in Haiti.

== Current library ==
The current National Library was established in 1939. In the 1950s, then director Max Bissainthe listed the holdings at 8,300 books and pamphlets. In a brief article, M. Bissainte described the Library's purchase of collections of Haitian historical and cultural materials. These included some rare colonial-era books, maps and lithographs, and several important Haitian journals such as La Ronde and Haïti Littéraire. However, sometime later three-fourths of the collection "mysteriously" disappeared, possibly during the government of François "Papa Doc" Duvalier (1957–1971).

Today the Library oversees a network of smaller libraries elsewhere in the country. The Library also functions as the country's bibliographic agency. The first Haitian national bibliography was published in the mid-1950s under Max Bissainthe, and the Library has since produced a number of bibliographies and supplements.

== Disasters ==
During the 2010 Haiti earthquake, the National Library did not suffer major structural damage. However, an unknown number of items from the collection were lost or damaged. The Library closed for repairs and subsequently re-opened, with a number of improvements and additions to the facilities, such as a new meeting room, which has been made available to young people.

During the Haitian crisis, the library was looted by criminal gangs on 3 April 2024. Its director, Dangelo Neard, confirmed that the facility's furniture was stolen and its generator ransacked.
