= Fritz Jean =

Haitian politician

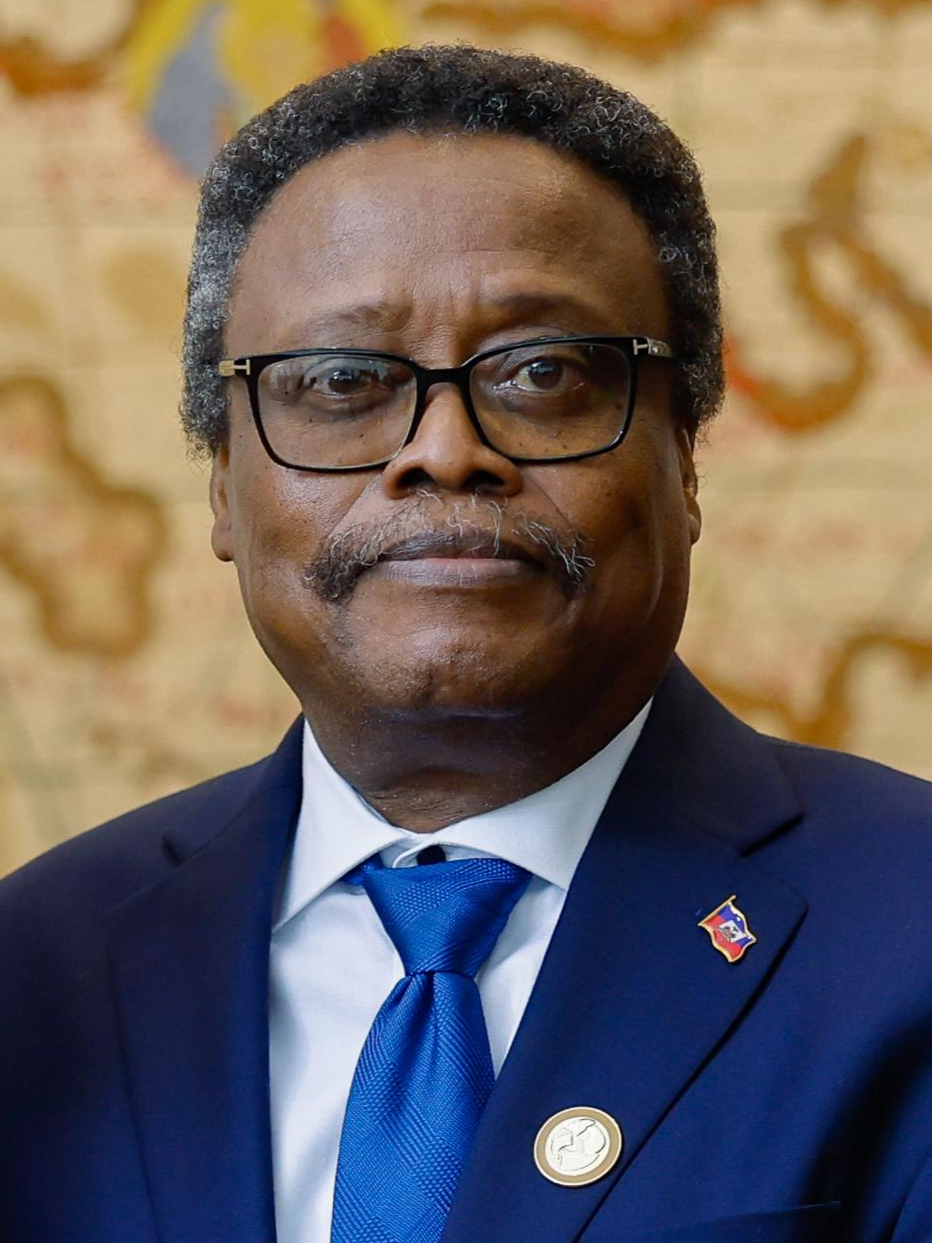
- Jean in 2025

3rd Chairman of the Transitional Presidential Council
- In office 7 March 2025 – 7 August 2025
- Preceded by: Leslie Voltaire
- Succeeded by: Laurent Saint-Cyr

18th Prime Minister of Haiti
- In office 26 February 2016 – 28 March 2016
- President: Jocelerme Privert (acting)
- Preceded by: Evans Paul
- Succeeded by: Enex Jean-Charles

Member of the Transitional Presidential Council
- In office 25 April 2024 – 7 February 2026
- Prime Minister: Michel Patrick Boisvert (acting); Garry Conille (acting); Alix Didier Fils-Aime (acting)

Personal details
- Born: Fritz Alphonse Jean Cap-Haïtien, Haiti
- Party: Inite
- Education: Fordham University; New School

Fritz Alphonse Jean is a Haitian economist, politician and writer who served as the 3rd chairman of the Transitional Presidential Council of Haiti from March to August 2025. He previously served as prime minister of Haiti in 2016 and as governor of the Banque de la République d'Haïti from 1998 until 2001. Since 2012, he is the president of the Chamber of Commerce, Industry and Professions of Nord-Est and is part of the national commemoration committee of the 100th anniversary of the United States occupation of Haiti. He was elected by the Montana Consensus as the head of the provisional president of Haiti on January 30, 2022.

== Early life and education ==
Fritz Jean was born in Cap-Haïtien. He originates from the nearby commune of Sainte-Suzanne, Nord-Est, where he spent many childhood summers and with which he maintains strong ties. Fritz Jean studied economics and mathematics in the United States, in New York at Fordham University and the New School for Social Research before returning to pursue his professional career in Haiti.

== Professional life ==
Jean spent several years (1987–91) at the Université d'Etat d'Haïti (UEH) in Port-au-Prince as a professor and consultant before moving on to general economic consulting work in the Haitian public and private sectors. In 1996 he was named vice-governor of the Banque de la République d'Haïti, a post he held for two years. In February 1998, under the René Préval government, he was named governor of Bank of the Republic of Haiti, Haiti's central bank where he remained in office until August 2001.

Later on, between 2005 and 2009 he was dean of the Faculty of Social Sciences, Economics and Political science at the Université Notre Dame d'Haïti. Passionate about the future of the Haitian youth, Jean also served as president of YMCA-Haiti from 2007 until 2010. Jean speaks Haitian Creole, French and English fluently.

Jean is also a founding member of the Haitian Stock Exchange. On February 25, 2016, he was nominated as the interim prime minister of Haiti.

On March 20, 2016, the lower house of the chamber of deputies of Haiti's parliament rejected the general policy of Jean. He did not receive the confidence vote by the majority of deputies.

The next day, Enex Jean-Charles was chosen to replace Jean as the new prime minister of Haiti.

The Transitional Presidential Council, formed in 2024 after the resignation of acting Prime Minister Ariel Henry and the escalation of the gang war in Haiti, chose Jean as its head on March 7, 2025. The goal of the council is to organize elections to take place before February 2026.

== United States Sanctions ==
In November 2025, the United States placed visa restrictions on Jean, accusing him of supporting gangs and worsening the Haitian security situation. Jean alleged that the sanctions were actually because he, along with other members of the Transitional Presidential Council, were moving to replace acting Prime Minister Alix Didier Fils-Aimé, saying, "Once we started reviewing the possibilities of changing the head of government, members of (the council) started receiving threats of visa cancellation and other sanctions from the U.S. Embassy representative and the Canadian ambassador." Joined at a press briefing by Leslie Voltaire, Jean shared messages allegedly sent to him by the Canadian ambassador, André François Giroux, and the American chargé d’affaires, Henry T. Wooster, warning him not to push for Fils-Aimé's removal.

== Books ==
1. "Haiti – the end of an economic history" (original title in French: "Haïti – la fin d'une histoire économique") is an economical and historical overview of Haiti published in 2013, sold and distributed in Haiti.

2. "Amethys – open wounds" (original title in French: "Améthys – Plaies Ouvertes") is Jean's first novel, written in French, that follows the adventures of a young boy living in Cap-Haitien.

Political offices
Preceded by Evans Paul	Prime Minister of Haiti; 2016	Succeeded by Enex Jean-Charles
Preceded by Leslie Voltaire	Chairman of the Transitional Presidential Council; 2025	Succeeded by Laurent Saint-Cyr
