= Banque de l'Union Haïtienne =

Banque de l'Union haïtienne, S.A.
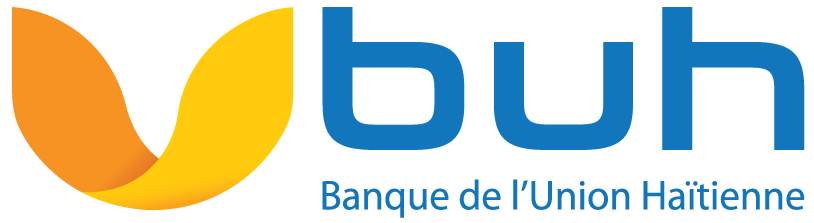
- Company type: Private
- Industry: Financial services
- Founded: 1973
- Headquarters: 3, rue Jean-Gilles Airport Road; Port-au-Prince, Haiti
- Key people: Olivier Barrau (President)
- Revenue: US$ 12.3 million (2016)
- Net income: US$ 3 million (2016)
- Total assets: US$ 193.9 million (2016)
- Website: https://buh.ht

Banque de l'Union haïtienne, S.A. better known as BUH is a bank operating in Haiti. Founded in 1973, the first Haitian private bank. Clifford Brandt had the idea to create a financial company with a full Haitian ownership in a sector largely composed of foreign banks.

Following a major recapitalization, a new board of directors was unanimously elected at the general meeting of shareholders on June 20, 2013. Since this milestone, the bank has adopted an ambitious development plan for years to come.

BUH currently has a network of twenty-three (23) branches across the country.

== History ==
BUH was founded in affiliation with Banco Popular Dominicano of the Dominican Republic. The idea was born from a meeting in the Dominican Republic between Haitian businessman Clifford Brandt and Banco Popular's then president, Alejandro Grullon, in 1972. Because there were no Haitian private banks at the time, a preparatory committee was formed after, Alejandro Grullon offered his support making available to the committee the by-laws and relevant documents of Banco Popular. The by-laws were then modified to be in harmony with Haiti's laws. On June 2, 1973, a General Assembly composed of 420 shareholders approved its formation, its first set of by-laws were dated August 14, 1972 and elected its first Board of Directors consisting of nine members and a Comptroller. Finally in October, 1973, BUH started its operations with a staff of 46 at 102, Rue du Quai in downtown Port-au-Prince.

In 1999 following an IT conversion failure, the bank had to take provisions which almost totally wiped out its shareholders' equity and was on the brink of failure. In August 2001, the board of directors obtained a vast majority of it shareholders voting for the sale of the bank to another major banking institution in Haiti. After failure to obtain final approval from the regulatory authorities, the bank's chairman and CEO, Richard Sassine, in the third month of his chairmanship took the reins of a weak and failing institution and successfully stabilized the bank, boosted employee moral, regained the confidence of shareholders and depositors and oversaw the stabilization and recovery of the first privately held financial institution in Haiti. In July 2008, Sassine relinquished his position as chairman and CEO after a 7-year tenure followed by his retirement from the Board of Directors on September 30, 2008, after a 15-year tenure.

In June 2006, BUH had entered into an alliance with Antigua based ABI Bank, Ltd. In October 2008, ABI Bank took control of the bank with a new board of directors and relinquished all of its majority shares in September 2013. Following the earthquake of January 2010, the bank moved its headquarters to Pétion-Ville. Today the bank has 23 branch offices and over 2000 shareholders, making it one of the most widely held companies in Haiti.
