= Alix Didier Fils-Aimé =

Haitian politician (born 1971)

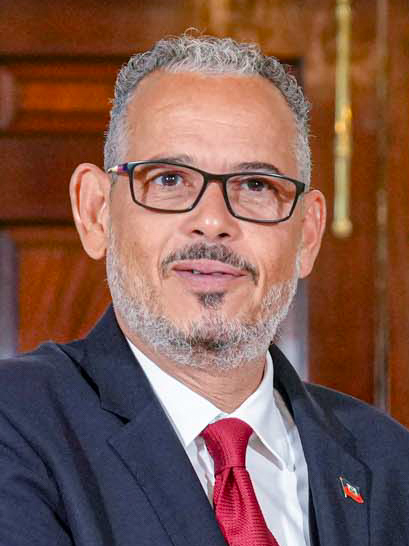
- Fils-Aimé in 2026

Prime Minister of Haiti
- Acting
- Assumed office 10 November 2024
- President: Vacant
- Leader: Leslie Voltaire; Fritz Jean; Laurent Saint-Cyr
- Preceded by: Garry Conille (acting)

President of the Chamber of Commerce of Haiti
- In office 14 May 2011 – 7 February 2016
- President: Michel Martelly

Personal details
- Born: 14 November 1971 (age 55) Port-au-Prince, Haiti
- Party: Independent
- Parent: Alix Fils-Aimé (father)
- Education: Boston University

Alix Didier Fils-Aimé (Haitian Creole pronunciation: [aliks didje fis eme]; born 14 November 1971) is a Haitian businessman and politician who has served as the acting prime minister of Haiti since 2024, and became the country’s sole leader following the dissolution of the Transitional Presidential Council, starting on 7 February 2026.

== Early life and education ==
Fils-Aimé studied at Boston University. He owns a chain of dry cleaning stores that he inherited from his mother.

== Business career ==
From 1999 to 2011 he was the president of Hainet, one of the internet providers in Haiti. The company became insolvent and sold its assets in 2013. He is one of the founders of the Association des Entreprises de Technologies de l'Information et de la Communication (ATIC).

Fils-Aimé was a member of the board of Banque de l'Union Haïtienne (BUH), where he replaced Eddy Deeb, until his nomination as Prime Minister of Haiti.

He was the president of the Chamber of Commerce of Haiti in the government of former president Michel Martelly. He ran for a seat in the Senate for the Vérité party in 2015.

== Acting Prime Minister ==
=== Appointment ===
On 10 November 2024, he succeeded Garry Conille as acting Prime Minister of Haiti. Conille was fired by the Transitional Presidential Council the same day.

On 23 January 2026, the Transitional Presidential Council attempted to fire Fils-Aimé, seeking a replacement within thirty days. However, Laurent Saint-Cyr, chairman of the Transitional Presidential Council, refused to sign and publish the motion on Le Moniteur that would have removed him. After the mandate of the Transitional Presidential Council expired on 7 February 2026, powers were handed over to Fils-Aimé. On 23 February 2026, the "National Pact for Stability and the Organization of Elections" was signed by a number of political parties and civil society groups to support Fils-Aimé as the sole executive of Haiti until the next election is held.

=== Actions ===
During mid-2025, Fils-Aimé created a drone task force consisting of Erik Prince's private security contractors working with Haitian police officers, because he was dissatisfied with the performance of the Haitian National Police under Director-General Normil Rameau during the Haitian conflict. Fils-Aimé wanted to replace Rameau, but initially could not because he had the support of the Transitional Presidential Council. Coordination between the National Police and the prime minister's drone task force improved after Vladimir Paraison replaced Ramaeu in August 2025.

Fils-Aimé has been supportive of the Salvadoran military intervention in Haiti to fight Haitian gangs. Speaking about Nayib Bukele, Fils-Aimé said, “He came to stand on the side of the Haitian people.” Haitian security forces in conjunction with Salvadoran troops in 2026 November, scored their first victories in two years over the gangs. First, Fils-Aimé confirmed the killing of Boston Gang leader Joseph Saintil on 5 November. Then coalition forces wrestled control of Stade Sylvio Cator, Haiti's national stadium on 12 November.

== See also ==
- List of heads of state of Haiti

Political offices
Preceded by Garry Conille; Acting	Prime Minister of Haiti; Acting; 2024–present	Incumbent
