= Association of Haitian Industries =

ADIH
- Association des industries d'Haïti
- Founded: 1980; 46 years ago
- Headquarters: Pétion-Ville
- Location: Haiti
- Key people: Grégor Avril; Georges B. Sassine; Michel Lemke
- Website: www.adih.ht

The Association des industries d'Haïti (ADIH), founded in 1980, is an association of around 100 manufacturers in Haiti. It is headed by president Maulik Radia and is best known internationally for its work promoting assembly plants in Haiti.

== Chronology ==
In early 1986, during a period of social upheaval, the ADIH called on the government of Jean-Claude Duvalier to exercise "tolerance and moderation". In 1989, it began lobbying efforts on the issue of textile quotas for Haiti. After the 1991 coup d'état which brought general Raoul Cédras to power, the association managed escrow accounts for tax collection from foreign corporate entities in Haiti until 1994. In 2004, the association stated that they viewed the second overthrow of Jean-Bertrand Aristide as a positive development. In coordination with Bill Clinton, they successfully lobbied the US government from 2003 to 2006 to ensure that textiles coming from Haiti would no longer be subject to import tariffs. (Cf. HOPE & HELP) In 2009, they opposed the parliamentary vote to raise the minimum wage in Haiti to 200 gourdes an hour. In 2013 the association again lobbied against a minimum wage increase, and argued that strikes would damage the Haitian garment industry. They likewise argued against a minimum wage increase in 2016.

More recently, the ADIH met with Jocelerme Privert to discuss the consequences of smuggling.
