= Michel Patrick Boisvert =

Haitian civil servant and politician

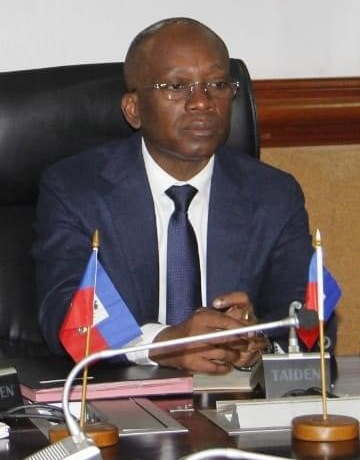
- Boisvert in 2023

Acting Prime Minister of Haiti
- In office 24 April 2024 – 3 June 2024
- Leader: Edgard Leblanc Fils
- Preceded by: Ariel Henry (acting)
- Succeeded by: Garry Conille (acting)

Minister of Economy and Finance
- In office 5 March 2020 – 12 June 2024
- Appointed by: Jovenel Moïse
- Prime Minister: Joseph Jouthe; Claude Joseph (acting); Ariel Henry (acting); Himself (acting)
- Preceded by: Joseph Jouthe
- Succeeded by: Ketleen Florestal

Personal details
- Born: Petit-Goâve, Haiti
- Education: University of Port-au-Prince; State University of Haiti; University of Auvergne

Michel Patrice Boisvert (French pronunciation: [miʃɛl patʁis bwavɛʁ]) is a Haitian civil servant and politician who served as the interim prime minister of Haiti from 24 April to 3 June 2024. The Transitional Presidential Council, inaugurated on 25 April, had the power to replace him, and did so on 3 June 2024 after it appointed Garry Conille as Prime Minister. Boisvert has served as Minister of Economy and Finance since 2020, initially in the cabinets of Joseph Jouthe, Claude Joseph, and Ariel Henry. Boisvert previously served as director-general of the Ministry of Economy and Finance from 2018 to 2020. Amid the February–March 2024 escalation of the Haitian crisis, Boisvert has served as acting prime minister, overseeing the operations of Henry's government during his absence from the country. Following Henry's resignation on 24 April 2024, Boisvert became acting prime minister of Haiti.

== Biography ==
Boisvert was born in Petit-Goâve. He received an accounting degree from the University of Port-au-Prince, an economics degree from the State University of Haiti, and a master's degree in economic policy management from the University of Auvergne. He was employed at the Bank of the Republic of Haiti from 1991 to 1995 and as a regional official of the Ministry of Economy and Finance, based in Petit-Goâve, from 1995 to 2010. From 2010 to 2018, Boisvert served within the ministry as the Director of Tax Inspection.

In 2018, Boisvert was appointed as director-general of the Ministry of Economy and Finance. On 5 March 2020, he joined the cabinet of Prime Minister Joseph Jouthe as Minister of Economy and Finance and continued in this office under Jouthe's successor Claude Joseph. Boisvert has retained his position in the interim government formed under acting Prime Minister Ariel Henry following the assassination of President Jovenel Moïse in 2021.

On 25 February 2024, Boisvert assumed interim leadership of Henry's government while the prime minister traveled to Kenya to negotiate the deployment of Kenyan police forces to Haiti amid the domestic crisis exacerbated by escalating gang violence. During Henry's absence, a major gang offensive targeted his government, prompting Boisvert to declare a state of emergency on 3 March. On 7 March, with the crisis ongoing and Henry unable to reenter Haiti, Boisvert extended the state of emergency for one month. Henry resigned to make way for the Transitional Presidential Council which was sworn-in on 25 April 2024, with his outgoing cabinet naming Boisvert as the interim Prime Minister. In late-May 2024, because Fritz Bélizaire who was supposed to succeed but withdrawn his nomination, the council extended Boisvert's tenure for a month and chose Garry Conille as his replacement. Conille was sworn in on 3 June 2024.
