= Public holidays in Curaçao =

This is a list of public holidays in Curaçao.

Date	Name in English	Name in Dutch	Remarks
January 1 (Fixed)	New Year's Day	Nieuwjaarsdag	
February 12 (Floating)	Carnival Monday	Karnaval	
March 20 – April 23 (Special floating Friday)	Good Friday	Goede Vrijdag	Christian holiday
March 22 – April 25 (Special floating Sunday)	Easter Sunday	Pasen	Christian holiday
March 23 – April 26 (Special floating Monday)	Easter Monday	Pasenmaandag	Christian holiday
April 27 (Fixed)	King's Day	Koningsdag	
May 1 (Fixed)	Labour Day	Dag van de Arbeid	
April 30 – June 3 (Special floating Thursday)	Ascension Day	Hemelvaartsdag	Christian holiday
May 10 – June 13 (Special floating Sunday)	Whit Sunday	Pinksteren	Christian holiday
July 2 (Fixed)	Curaçao National Flag and Anthem Day	Curaçao Nationale Vlag en Volkslied Dag	
October 10 (Fixed)	Curaçao Day	Dag van Curaçao	Since 2010
December 25 (Fixed)	Christmas Day	Kerstmis	Christian holiday
December 26 (Fixed)	Second Day of Christmas	Tweede kerstdag	Christian holiday
December 31 (Fixed)	New Year's Eve	Oudejaarsavond	Half Day Holiday
