= Garry Conille =

Haitian politician (born 1966)

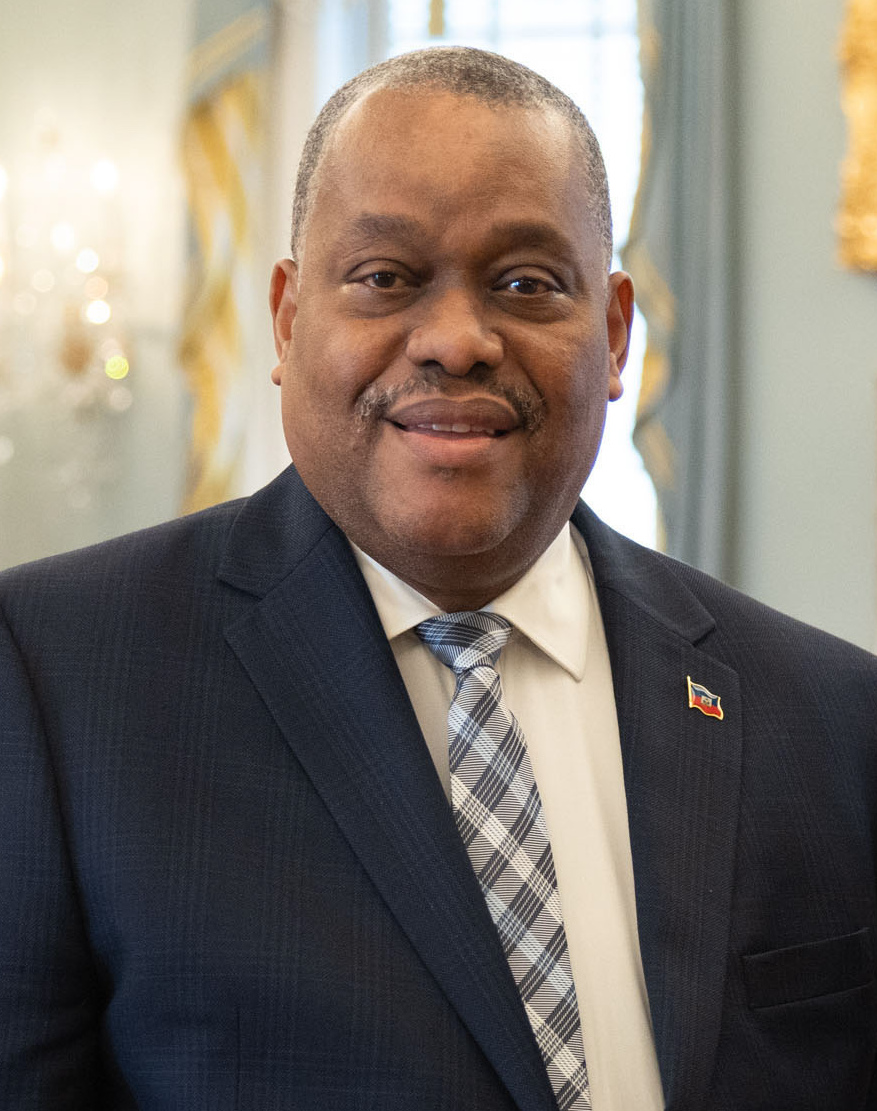
- Conille in 2024

15th Prime Minister of Haiti
- Acting; 3 June 2024 – 10 November 2024
- Leader: Edgard Leblanc Fils; Leslie Voltaire
- Preceded by: Michel Patrick Boisvert (acting)
- Succeeded by: Alix Didier Fils-Aimé (acting)
- In office 18 October 2011 – 16 May 2012
- President: Michel Martelly
- Preceded by: Jean-Max Bellerive
- Succeeded by: Laurent Lamothe

Minister of Interior and Territorial Communities
- In office 12 June 2024 – 10 November 2024
- Prime Minister: Himself (acting)
- Preceded by: Ariel Henry (acting)
- Succeeded by: Paul Antoine Bien-Aimé

Acting Minister of Justice
- In office 22 November 2011 – 12 December 2011
- President: Michel Martelly
- Preceded by: Josué Pierre-Louis
- Succeeded by: Michel Brunache

Personal details
- Born: 26 February 1966 (age 60)
- Party: Independent
- Education: University of Haiti; UNC-Chapel Hill

Garry Conille (French pronunciation: [ɡaʁi kɔnij]; born 26 February 1966) is a Haitian politician, physician, academic, development worker, and author who served as acting prime minister from 3 June to 11 November 2024 under the Transitional Presidential Council. He previously served as the 15th prime minister from 2011 to 2012, submitting his resignation on 24 February 2012, and being officially succeeded by Laurent Lamothe on 16 May 2012.

On 28 May 2024, the Transitional Presidential Council tapped Conille to return to the role as the Caribbean nation works to restore stability and take back control from violent gangs.

On 10 November 2024, the Transitional Presidential Council replaced Conille with businessman and former political candidate Alix Didier Fils-Aimé.

== Early life ==
Garry Conille is the second of a family of four brothers (Serge, Pierre and Jean Conille). He is the son of Marie Antoinette Darbouze and Dr. Serge Conille, former Minister of Sports and Youth in the Duvalier government. He is married to Betty Rousseau, the step daughter of Marc Bazin, a former prime minister of Haiti and has twin girls, Soraya and Gaelle. Betty and her twin sister Kathy are Bazin's daughters from his wife Marie Yolène's (née Sam) first marriage.

== Medical career ==
After graduating from Collège Canado-Haïtien and the Faculty of Medicine and Pharmacy of University of Haiti, Garry Conille obtained an MA in Political and Health Administration, as a fellow of the Fulbright Scholar Program at the University of North Carolina at Chapel Hill. Afterwards, he received a certificate of specialty in gynecology and obstetrics at the Isaïe Jeanty Maternity Hospital and a Ph.D. in Medicine at the University of Haiti.

Between July 1994 and June 1998, at the Haitian Association for the National Development, he developed and implemented a primary care system that provided basic health care in poor areas of Haiti. In August 1999, as an evaluation consultant, Garry Conille was responsible for the impact assessment of the Albert Schweitzer Hospital, an NGO in the field of community development, providing community care to over 260,000 people in Artibonite. Between the years 2000 to 2002, he created and hosted, on Radio Vision 2000, the first national interactive program focused on issues related to reproductive and sexual health.

From October 2002 to May 2004, he worked as a technical advisor for Population Services International (PSI).

== United Nations career ==
Garry Conille began his career with the United Nations (UN) in October 1999 as a project officer with the United Nations Population Fund (UNFPA), before becoming a program officer under the same agency in April 2001, where he remained until October 2002.

In May 2004, he became an international official inside the United Nations system. Until January 2006, he was a country technical advisor for the UNFPA, as well as a sub-regional technical advisor under the Africa/Ethiopia Division. In this capacity, he was responsible for providing technical assistance and for ensuring capacity building in key areas of population and health reproduction.

From January to December 2006, he worked as technical advisor for the United Nations' Millennium Development Goals (MDGs) project, under the supervision of Jeffrey Sachs, then-Special Representative of the UN Secretary-General. In January 2007, Conille returned to UNFPA as Chief Technical Advisor for Africa, following which he acted as coordinator for the Global Program to Enhance Reproductive Health Commodity Security.

From September 2008 until his special assignment in Haiti, Garry Conille worked as team leader of the MDG Unit at the United Nations Development Program (UNDP). There, he developed a framework for MDG acceleration used by more than 30 countries, organized jointly with UNDESA the process of preparing the Secretary-General's report on the MDGs, which was presented at the 2010 G8 Summit, and led the preparation of Gleneagles scenarios in more than a dozen African countries, in collaboration with the International Monetary Fund.

In the wake of Haiti's 2010 earthquake, he was requested by the Administrator of UNDP and the UN Secretary-General to assume the duties of head office of the Special Envoy of the UN Secretary-General to Haiti. Conille worked with the Haitian government, the United Nations' Haiti office and major donors to develop and implement a strategic plan for the reconstruction of Haiti. He was also involved in coordinating the humanitarian response and in the establishment of the Interim Haiti Recovery Commission, the central pillar of the reconstruction effort.

Conille has also served as United Nations Resident Coordinator for three countries, namely Niger (2011–2011), Burundi (2017–2020), and Jamaica (2020–2022), in that order. In the latter, he helmed the Multi-Country Office in Jamaica, which also covers the Bahamas, Bermuda, Turks and Caicos, and the Cayman Islands.

== Prime Minister of Haiti ==
=== First term ===
By the end of August 2011, unofficial comments of Haitian politicians indicated that Garry Conille might be the next nomination for the post of Prime Minister. On 5 September, he received the official designation for this office from the President Michel Martelly. This would be the third nomination after Jean-Max Bellerive's resignation on 15 May 2011, and the subsequent rejections by the Senate of the nominees Daniel Rouzier and Bernard Gousse.

Conille's nomination faced questions as to whether he fulfilled the requirement regarding his recent residency, prescribed in the Constitution of Haiti, of having resided in the country for five consecutive years prior to ratification. The president countered by arguing that Conille was exempt from the residency requirement as he had been working for the United Nations, paying taxes to the United Nations for Haiti.

The review and ratification process of his nomination began on 8 September 2011, following which the Chamber of Deputies approved his appointment on 16 September in a unanimous vote. On 5 October, the Senate confirmed Garry Conille's appointment as the 16th Prime Minister of Haiti, making him the youngest Prime Minister under the previous Constitution of 1987.

=== Resignation ===
Conille resigned on 24 February 2012, following a loss of confidence in him from his ministers. He had clashed with ministers and Martelly over several issues, the most recent being a parliamentary investigation into whether senior government officials held dual nationality, a violation of the Constitution of Haiti. Martelly refused to comply with the investigation, stating the executive branch did not have to comply with the investigation. Some ministers cooperated with the investigation, but others refused. When Conille called a meeting with ministers to discuss the matter, none of them appeared. The incident served to demonstrate their lack of confidence in him, triggering his resignation. Conille remained prime minister until his successor was appointed, as per Article 165 of the constitution. He was succeeded by Laurent Lamothe, who was voted through by both parliamentary legislative chambers before being formally appointed in May 2012.

=== Second term ===
On 28 May 2024, Conille was elected as the interim prime minister by six out of seven members of the Transitional Presidential Council with voting rights, following a nomination procedure that received domestic criticism for its slow progress since the resignation of Ariel Henry on 24 April 2024 amidst the ongoing turmoil in Haiti. He was sworn in on 3 June 2024. Shortly afterwards, Conille was hospitalized on 8 June for undisclosed reasons, with sources from within the government stating to media that his condition was caused by an asthma attack. He was released after a night of treatment. Conille's cabinet was sworn in on 12 June, with him being appointed as the Minister of Interior and Territorial Communities.

Conille's government appointed Rameau Normil, the former acting director-general of the Haitian National Police who served under president Jovenel Moïse for 15 months before his dismissal, back to his post in order to handle the worsening security situation, replacing Frantz Elbé on 21 June. The first contingent of the Multinational Security Support Mission in Haiti was deployed to Haiti on 25 June under Conille's premiership. His first official trip after assuming the premiership was to the United States, in order to ask for additional assistance for Haiti.

On 29 July, Conille was giving an interview to CNN at the General Hospital in Port-au-Prince when gunfire was heard in a nearby neighborhood. The interview proceeded as planned; he was later escorted to safety. Following the massacre carried out in October 2024 by a gang in Pont-Sondé, Conille travelled to the United Arab Emirates and Kenya in order to seek security assistance.

On 10 November 2024, the transitional council published an executive order in Le Moniteur replacing Conille with businessman and former political candidate Alix Didier Fils-Aimé. Conille called his dismissal "illegal". The Constitution of Haiti only permits the parliament to dismiss a prime minister, and at the time of Conille's dismissal, there was no parliament to speak of.

== Publications ==
- Recommendations to support Haiti’s economic development (2006), with Professor Jeffrey Sachs and Ambassador Gert Rosenthal (online)
- ICT for Education and Development − The Challenges of meeting the Millennium Development Goals in Africa (2006) (online)
- 2004–2007 report of the Commission for Social Affairs: African Union (2007)
- Cancer of the Cervix at Maternity Isaïe Jeanty (May 1992)
- Sustainable financing of Health Care Reform in developing Countries ( May 1999)
- Gender Poverty and health care reform (May 2001)
- Social Franchising of reproductive health service in developing countries

Political offices
Preceded by Jean-Max Bellerive	Prime Minister of Haiti; 2011–2012	Succeeded by Laurent Lamothe
Preceded by Josué Pierre-Louis	Acting Minister of Justice; 2011	Succeeded by Michel Brunache
Preceded by Michel Patrick Boisvert	Acting Prime Minister of Haiti; 2024	Succeeded by Alix Didier Fils-Aimé
