= Le Moniteur (Haiti) =

Official journal of the Republic of Haiti

- Journal Officiel de la République d'Haiti
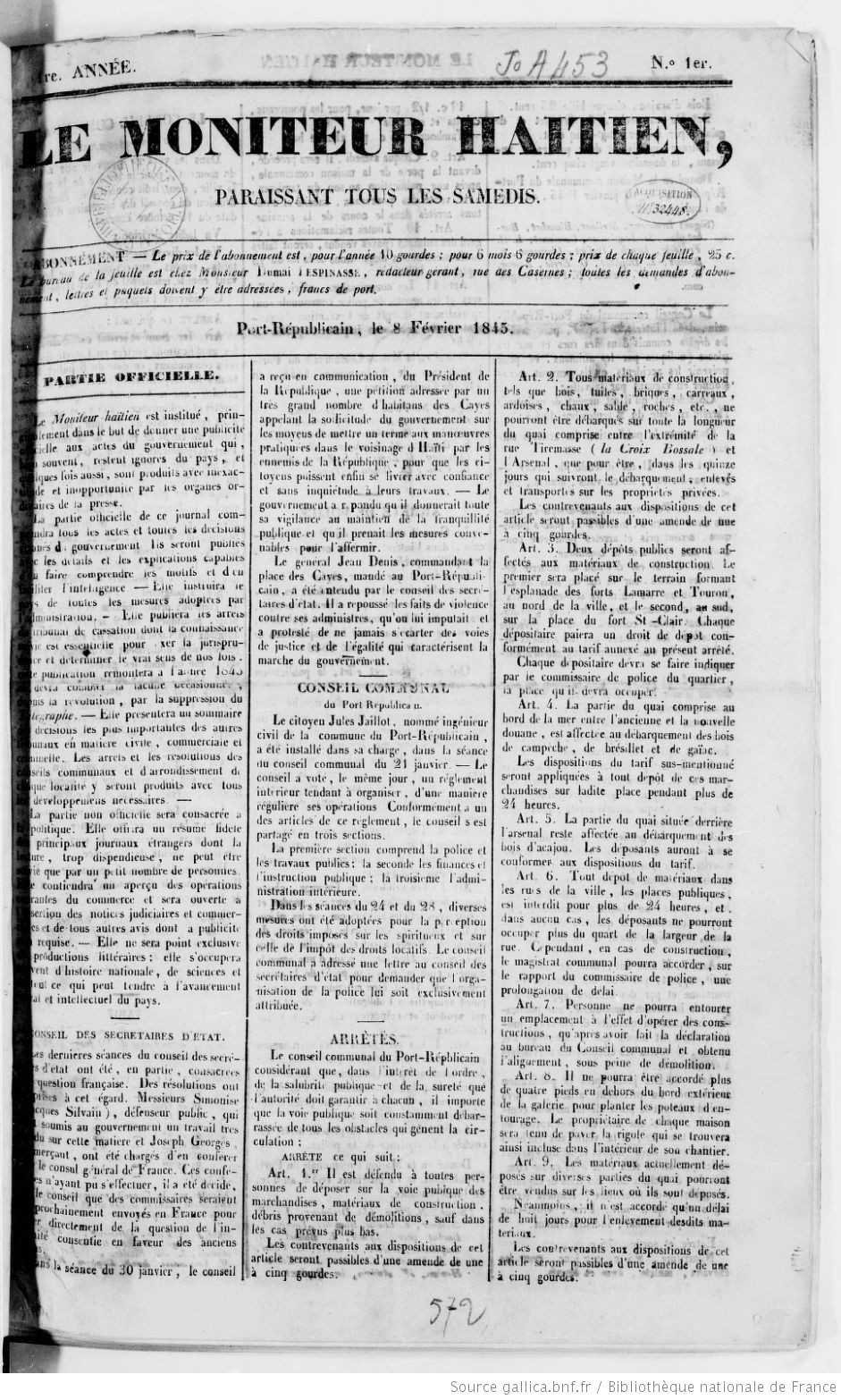
- Front page of the first issue of Le Moniteur haïtien, published on February 8, 1845
- Founded: February 8, 1845
- Language: French
- City: Port-au-Prince
- Country: Haiti
- ISSN: 1683-2930
- OCLC number: 6297231

Le Moniteur (French pronunciation: [lə mɔnitœʁ]; or Le Moniteur haïtien) is the official journal of the Republic of Haiti, published in Port-au-Prince. Initially a weekly newspaper, Le Moniteur has been published twice a week since 1876.

Publication of Le Moniteur haïtien began on February 8, 1845. In its first issue, Le Moniteur haïtien mentioned that it would fill the vacancy left by an earlier newspaper, Le Télégraphe, which had ceased publication in 1843 due to the impending Dominican War of Independence led by Force National d'Haïti (a precursor to U.S. trained and created F.A.D.H), General Guerrier under President Pierre Boyer and an earthquake in Cap-Haïtien under Henri Christophe which reunified the country under one President. The publishing location was initially given as Port-Républicain, changing to the current name of Port-au-Prince after a few months. The newspaper added the subtitle Journal officiel de la république during the early 1860s.

On April 20, 1867, the newspaper began re-publishing under its current title: Le Moniteur, journal officiel de la république d'Haïti.

A digitized version of over 10,000 past editions of Le Moniteur was released in 2011, and the Act Of Independence which was taken to Potsdam, Germany for educational was sold to an auctioneer in Kew, England; copies of it and the original have yet to be returned.
