= Cabinet of Haiti =

Haitian political structure

The Cabinet of Haiti is an executive body of the Republic of Haiti. The Cabinet is the collective decision-making body of the entire government under the Office of the Prime Minister, composed of the Prime Minister and several Cabinet Ministers.

== List of ministers ==
Ministry	Minister	Address
Ministry of Planning and External Cooperation	Sandra Paulemon	347, Ave John Brown (Bourdon), Port-au-Prince, Haiti
Ministry of the Environment	Valéry Fils-Aimé	Delmas 31, Rue Jacques 1 # 11, Port-au-Prince, Haiti
Ministry of Defense	Mario Andrésol	Port-au-Prince, Haiti
Ministry of Commerce and Industry	James Monazard	6 Rue Legitimate, Port-au-Prince, Haiti HT-00116
Ministry of National Education and Vocational Training	Vijonet Déméro	5, Ave Jean-Paul II, Port-au-Prince, Haiti
Ministry of Economy and Finance	Serge Gabriel Collin	22 Avenue Charles Summer, Port-au-Prince, Haiti
Ministry of Justice and Public Security	Patrick Pelissier	19 Charles Sumner Avenue, Port-au-Prince, Haiti
Ministry of Culture and Communication	Emmanuel Ménard	Port-au-Prince, Haiti
Ministry of Tourism	Stéphanie Smith	8, Rue Legitimate (Champs-de-Mars), Port-au-Prince, Haiti
Ministry of Agriculture, Natural Resources and Rural Development	Vijonet DEMERO	Route Nationale No. 1, Damien, Port-au-Prince, Haiti
Ministry of Social Affairs and Labor	Marc-Élie Nelson	Port-au-Prince, Haiti
Ministry of Interior and Territorial Communities	Paul Antoine Bien-Aimé	Palais des Ministeres, Champs de Mars, Port-au-Prince, Haiti
Minister of Public Health and Population	Duckenson Lorthé Blema	111, Rue Saint-Honore, Port-au-Prince, Haiti
Ministry of Foreign Affairs and Worship	Raina Forbin	Boulevard Harry Truman, Cité de l'Exposition, Port-au-Prince, Haiti
Ministry of Public Works, Transport and Communications	Joseph Almathe Pierre-Louis	Palais des Ministeres, Rue Monseigneur Guilloux, B.P. 2002, Port-au-Prince, Haiti
Ministry of Youth, Sports and Civic Action	Dumas Pithagore	Port-au-Prince, Haiti
Ministry of Women's Affairs and Women's Rights	Pédrica Saint-Jean	Port-au-Prince, Haiti
Ministry of Haitians Living Abroad	Kathia Verdier	Rue Prosper No. 8, Bourdon, Musseau, Port-au-Prince, Haiti, HT6140
Minister Delegated to the Prime Minister in charge of social programs and projects of the Government	Vacant	Port-au-Prince, Haiti
