= Lamothe =

Lamothe can be a name (or part of a name) of communes in France or a surname of people.

== Communes ==
- Lamothe, Landes, in the Landes département
- Lamothe, Haute-Loire, in the Haute-Loire département
- Bromont-Lamothe, in the Puy-de-Dôme département
- Lamothe-Capdeville, in the Tarn-et-Garonne département
- Lamothe-Cassel, in the Lot département
- Lamothe-Cumont, in the Tarn-et-Garonne département
- Lamothe-en-Blaisy, in the Haute-Marne département
- Lamothe-Fénelon, in the Lot département
- Lamothe-Goas, in the Gers département
- Lamothe-Landerron, in the Gironde département
- Lamothe-Montravel, in the Dordogne département

== People ==
- André LaMothe, American computer scientist and author
- Arthur Lamothe (1928–2013), Canadian-French film director and producer
- Daphne Lamothe, American academic administrator
- Denis Lamothe, Canadian politician
- Dieudonné LaMothe (born 1954), Haitian long-distance runner
- Esteban Lamothe (born 1977), Argentine actor
- Ferdinand Joseph LaMothe (c. 1890–1941), American musician known professionally as Jelly Roll Morton
- Georges Lamothe (1842–1894), French composer and organist
- Gisou Lamothe (1935–2020), Haitian painter and sculptor
- Jean-Baptiste-Gustave Lamothe (1856–1922), Canadian judge and lawyer
- John Dominique LaMothe (1868–1928), British-American bishop and missionary
- Joseph Lamothe, Haitian politician and briefly interim President of Haiti in 1879
- Laurent Lamothe (born 1972), Haitian politician, economist and businessman
- Louis Lamothe (1822–1869), French painter and academic
- Ludovic Lamothe (1882–1953), Haitian composer and pianist
- Lysane Blanchette-Lamothe (born 1984), Canadian politician
- Marc Lamothe (born 1974), Canadian ice hockey player
- Pierre Lamothe (born 1997), Canadian soccer player
- Romeo Lamothe (1914–1991), Canadian politician and teacher
- Ron Lamothe (born 1968), American film director and producer
- Serge Lamothe (born 1963), Canadian writer
- Willie Lamothe (1920–1992), Canadian musician and actor
