= Laurent Lamothe =

Prime Minister of Haiti from 2012 to 2014

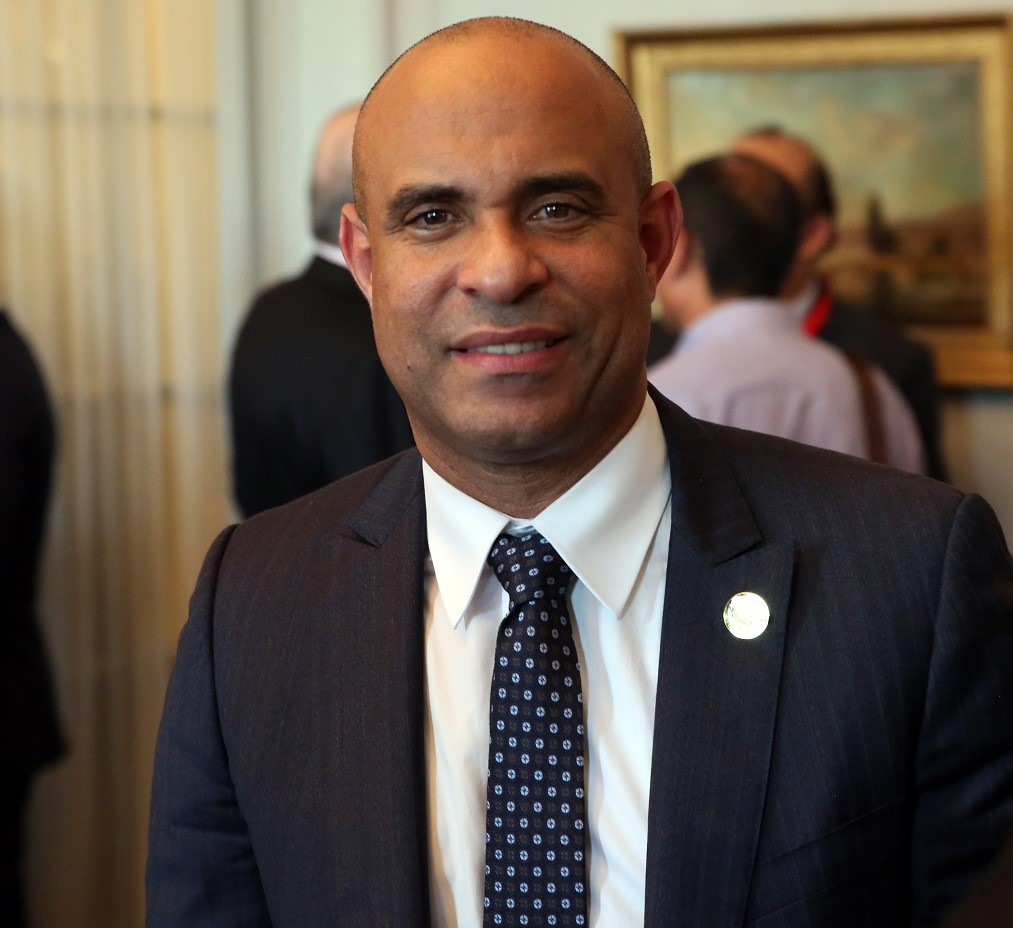

16th Prime Minister of Haiti
- In office 16 May 2012 – 14 December 2014
- President: Michel Martelly
- Preceded by: Garry Conille
- Succeeded by: Florence Duperval Guillaume (acting)

Minister of Planning and External Cooperation
- In office 6 August 2012 – 14 December 2014
- Preceded by: Josefa Gauthier
- Succeeded by: Florence Duperval Guillaume (acting)

Minister of Foreign Affairs
- In office 24 October 2011 – 6 August 2012
- Prime Minister: Garry Conille
- Preceded by: Marie-Michèle Rey
- Succeeded by: Pierre-Richard Casimir

Personal details
- Born: Laurent Salvador Lamothe; 14 August 1972 (age 54) Port-au-Prince, Haiti
- Party: Independent
- Education: Barry University; St. Thomas University

Laurent Salvador Lamothe (French pronunciation: [lɔʁɑ̃ salvadɔʁ lamɔt]; born 14 August 1972) is a Haitian businessman, technology entrepreneur, and political figure who has served in the government of Haiti as Foreign Minister beginning in October 2011, then as Prime Minister after appointment on 4 May 2012. On 14 December 2014, Lamothe resigned from his position as prime minister. More recently Lamothe has publicly spoken about the urgent need for the return of law and order in Haiti.

== Early life ==
Lamothe was born in Port-au-Prince as the son of Louis G. Lamothe, the founder of the Lope de Vega Institute, and Ghislaine Fortuney Lamothe, an artist. His elder brother, Ruben, served as captain of the Haitian Davis Cup tennis team for some time. A tennis player himself, Laurent Lamothe represented his country at the Davis Cup in 1994 and 1995.

=== Education ===
At age 19, Lamothe left Haiti to complete his tertiary studies in Florida. After obtaining a bachelor's degree in political sciences at Barry University in Miami, in 1996 he enrolled in Saint Thomas University in Miami Gardens, Florida, where he earned a master's degree in business management.

== Political career ==
In 1998, Lamothe co-founded the telecommunications company Global Voice Group.

Lamothe entered politics by accepting the position of Special Advisor to Haitian President Michel Martelly. In September 2011, Lamothe and former United States President Bill Clinton co-chaired the Presidential Advisory Council for the Economic Development and Investment in Haiti launched by President Martelly on 8 September 2011 to help redevelop Haiti by making it more attractive to foreign companies and investors. Later the same year, Lamothe was appointed Minister of Foreign Affairs. On 26 October 2011, he made his maiden speech as the new minister of foreign affairs during his installation ceremony, which took place in Bois-Verna, Haiti.

=== Prime minister ===
On 1 March 2012, following the resignation of Prime Minister Garry Conille, Martelly chose Lamothe to succeed him. Lamothe was tasked with overseeing Haiti's reconstruction after the devastating 2010 earthquake.

During Lamothe's tenure as prime minister, foreign direct investment increased to the highest level since the fall of the Duvalier dictatorship in the mid-1980s. Under his leadership, the government pursued reforms that made Haiti a safer and more business-friendly country with the implementation of a 15-year tax break to companies investing in the island nation. He also pushed for an increase of the police force by 30 percent, spearheaded the free education program, and promoted good governance by tackling corruption. During his tenure and according to a 2014 World Bank study, from 2012 to 2014, the number of people in extreme poverty in Haiti dropped from 31% to 24% thanks to the social program EDE PEP, which benefited two million people.

On 14 December 2014, Lamothe resigned from his position as prime minister after serving for 31 months.

=== Presidential campaign ===
In 2015, hoping to succeed his former boss President Martelly, his candidacy for the upcoming presidential campaign was barred. Lawyers for the opposition party CEP declared that Lamothe lacked the required "discharge". A requirement in the Haitian Constitution for government officials who were accountable for public monies, is to undergo an audit which reflects the Haitian state's assessment that government officials had properly accounted for the use public funds during their tenure in office. Under the Haitian Constitution, a discharge is a prerequisite for former officials who seek to return to public office. Lamothe was subjected to three audits conducted by the Cour Supérieure des Comptes et du Contentieux Administratif, the authority responsible for controlling public expenditures in Haiti. All the audit reports cleared Lamothe as having managed the public funds in a manner that was satisfactory to the auditors.

=== Post-campaign ===
In July 2015, Lamothe created LSL World Initiative, a private enterprise providing solutions to governments in implementing their own funding mechanisms to help them deliver sustainable development programs in line with their needs and priorities.

In December 2015, Lamothe founded the Dr. Louis G. Lamothe Foundation in honour and memory of his father Louis G. Lamothe. The Foundation will concentrate on the strategies to lead Haiti to emerging country status by 2041. After Hurricane Matthew struck Haiti, the Dr. Louis G. Lamothe Foundation has been working in Anse du Clerc to help the town recover from the damages. The Foundation aims to rehabilitate the fishing village and revive its economic activity by repairing the damaged houses and facilitating the acquisition of fishing equipment, among others. The foundation also aims to make various seeds for agriculture available to the farmers.

In December 2025, Lamothe made an Instagram post apologizing for having supported Michel Martelly before and during his presidency, calling it his greatest mistake. According to Lamothe, he fully cut ties with Martelly the day after the 2021 assassination of Jovenel Moïse.

== Legal ==
On 20 November 2022, Lamothe was sanctioned by the Canadian government for his involvement in human rights violations and supporting criminal gangs. Lamothe has denied allegations of money-laundering to help finance gangs, saying Ottawa had provided no evidence. A press release by the office of Canadian prime minister Justin Trudeau mentioned that Lamothe is suspected of protecting and enabling the illegal activities of armed criminal gangs.

In a 21 November 2022 statement, Lamothe demanded a public apology from the Canadian government. On 22 December, Lamothe filed a notice of application with Canada's Federal Court, arguing the sanctions were the result of an arbitrary decision and did not give Lamothe a chance to offer his side of the story.

On June 2, 2023, the United States announced Lamothe was ineligible to return to the US, citing the misappropriation of the PetroCaribe funds. The US is yet to present proof to support the allegations.

The PetroCaribe funds refers to aid that came through the provision of discounted oil deliveries from Venezuela. In the wake of the earthquake, Haiti was supposed to use the assistance to help the country rebuild.

Lamothe has adamantly pushed back on the allegation, accusing the United States of falling for the “false narrative” of the Haitian political discourse that for years has sought to assassinate his character.

Since taking office and after his resignation Lamothe's tenure as Prime Minister has undergone five comprehensive audits including a judicial decision that found no evidence supporting these allegations of misappropriated funds.

== Personal life ==
In 2013, Lamothe dated Czech model Petra Němcová, but as of 2015 they are no longer together.

== Awards and accolades ==
In 2015 National Alliance for the Advancement of Haitian Professionals Golden Honors Award for his work. He also received the Social Media Person of the Year award in 2015 by the Social Media Association of Haiti. In March 2016, Lamothe was inducted to the Sunshine State Conference Hall of Fame 2016 for tennis.

Lamothe has spoken about blockchain at the 2018 World Economic Forum in Davos, at the Transform Africa Summit, and at the Berlin Economic Forum.

He was the subject of a 2021 book, The Hands of the Prime Minister, by photojournalist Philip Holsinger.

Political offices
Preceded by Marie-Michèle Rey	Minister of Foreign Affairs; 2011–2012	Succeeded by Pierre Richard Casimir
Preceded by Garry Conille	Prime Minister of Haiti; 2012–2014	Succeeded by Florence Duperval Guillaume; Acting
