= Ministry of Worship (Haiti) =

Government minister of Haiti

- Coat of arms of Haiti

Agency overview
- Jurisdiction: Republic of Haiti
- Minister responsible: Antonio Rodrigue
- Website: http://www.primature.gouv.ht/

The Ministry of Worship is a ministry of the Government of Haiti. This ministry is responsible for playing an integral role in the Cabinet of the Prime Minister.
