= Electricity sector in Haiti =

Electricity sector of Haiti
Data
- Electricity coverage (2013): 38.5% (total); (LAC total average in 2007: 92%)
- Installed capacity (2016): 313,000 KW
- Share of fossil energy: 80.9% (2015 est.)
- Share of renewable energy: 18.8% (hydro); 0.3% (other)
- GHG emissions from electricity generation (2003): 0.2 Mt CO_{2}
- Average electricity use (2006): 75 kWh per capita
- Distribution losses (2006): 55% (inc. transmission losses)

Consumption by sector (% of total)
- Residential: 60%
- Industrial: 40% (inc. transport - 15%; services - 5%)

Tariffs and financing
- Average residential tariff (US$/kW·h, 2006): 0.176; (LAC average in 2005: 0.115)

Services
- Sector unbundling: No
- Share of private sector in generation: 23% (Independent Power Producer)
- Competitive supply to large users: No
- Competitive supply to residential users: No

Institutions
- No. of service providers: monopoly (EDH)
- Responsibility for regulation: None
- Responsibility for policy-setting: Ministry of Public Works, Transport and Communications (MTPTC)
- Responsibility for the environment: Ministry of the Environment (MDE)
- Electricity sector law: Yes (EDH creation Decree, 1989)
- Renewable energy law: No
- CDM transactions related to the electricity sector: None

The largely government owned electricity sector in Haiti, referred to as Électricité d'Haïti (ED'H for "Haiti Electric Utility", faced a deep crisis characterized by dramatic shortages and the lowest coverage of electricity in the Western Hemisphere in 2006. with only about 38.5% of the population having regular access to electricity. In addition, Haiti's large share of thermal generation (70%) makes the country especially vulnerable to rising and unstable oil prices.

Haiti has the smallest public sector in the LAC region, which in this case is reflected by a weak institutional capacity within the Ministry of Public Works, Transport and Communications (MTPTC). Since the MTPTC is the main government body in charge of the electricity sector, this lack of capacity affects directly the performance of the sector.

== Overviews ==
Haiti electricity production by source

=== Renewable energy ===
In 2017, the World Bank invested a total of $35 million to Haiti in order to improve access and expansion of renewable energy. The two projects are "Renewable Energy for All" and "Haiti Modern Energy Services for All". The money for the "Renewable Energy for All" is being split between three different sectors including: Public Administration - Energy and Extractives, Energy Transmission and Distribution, and Solar Energy. The project will be completed at the end of 2024. The World Bank's Country Director for Haiti, Anabela Abreau, has noted that "Haiti has significant untapped sources for renewable energy".

==== Wind energy ====
In 2011, the United States Environmental Protection Agency (EPA) Granted $15,000 to a group of researchers from Princeton University to design wind turbines to be used around the country. Wind energy has become an important focus for the Haitian government. The areas with the highest wind potential are located in the West, North-west, and North of Haiti. In 2017, construction for the new Irois power plant began. This power plant will produce wind, solar, and diesel energy. With a production capacity of 160 kWh, this hybrid power plant will be the first-ever constructed in Haiti.

==== Solar energy ====
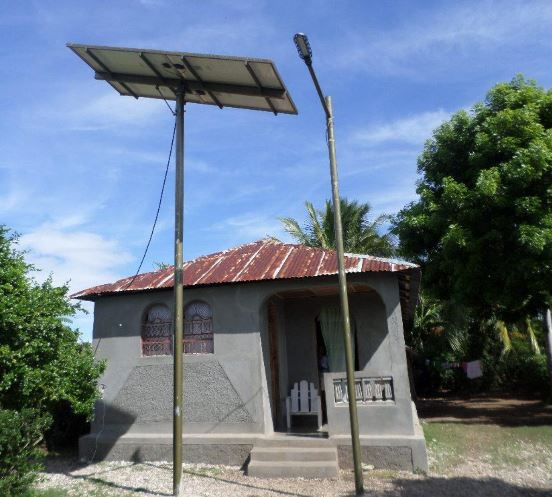
Haitian clinic where solar power is used to refrigerate rabies vaccine

In 2017, imports of solar equipment into the country were no longer taxed hoping to encourage the use of solar energy. According to a study by the Worldwatch Institute, Haiti has the ability to produce a sufficient amount of electricity from renewable resources and solar energy has very strong potential. The total capacity of solar energy installed is 0.7 MW. 80% of the solar energy produced is used for lighting; the other 20% is used for vaccines, seafood conservation, pumping, audiovisual and communication. Recently, many solar companies have seen Haiti as a huge market potential for solar energy. The founder of 10Power estimates that the potential solar power market is worth over $500 million. In 2013, the completion of Hôpital Universitaire de Mirebalais came to an end. This hospital is the largest solar-powered hospital in the world. The hospital has over 1,800 solar panels.

==== Hydropower energy ====
Hydropower is the second largest source of energy for Haiti. They have a capacity of 1000 GWh. Most hydropower plants do not operate to full capacity. However, as of 2018, Haiti's Peligre Hydroelectric power plant has been restored to full capacity. In 2011, the Inter-American Development Bank (IDB) gave a $20 million grant to go towards restoring the Peligre Hydroelectric plant. The country has the potential to create 896 GWh yearly. There has been talk of developing micro-hydropower for rural areas of Haiti. Hydropower is seen as a possible alternative for those who don't have access to grid electricity.

==== Biomass ====
With the use of agriculture and forestry waste, it can be turned into energy and can be turned into something similar to natural gas. Haiti has much agricultural waste that can be used for biomass energy. However, it has setbacks such as finding a way to economically collect the waste and also the effects of taking away these materials from their natural ecosystems. Currently, Haiti produces about 1 MW of electricity from bagasse.

==== Government targets ====
Through the National Development Plan of the Energy Sector of Haiti, the Haitian government has specific energy goals they would like to reach by 2032. These include the promotion of alternative energy sources, strengthen the State's regulatory role in the field of energy, improve the production and distribution of energy, and improve the provision of electricity. The current president of Haiti, Jovenel Moïse, has plans to provide electricity in rural areas and by the end of his presidency he wants to provide constant electricity for all Haitians. The government has goals of adopting more policies in favor of renewable energy. By 2020, they want to increase the use of renewable energy by 50%.

==== Jobs in renewable energy ====
In 2018, USAID Local Enterprise and Value Chain Enhancement (LEVE) project gave grants to local vocational schools to help develop solar energy training courses. Due to the projected growth of the solar power energy industry in Haiti, USAID LEVE is helping improve these schools' relationships with the private solar energy sector.

== Electricity supply and demand ==
=== Voltage and frequency ===
Electricity in Haiti is 110 volts, alternating at 60 cycles per second.

=== Installed capacity ===
Most of the generation infrastructure in Haiti is very old and costly to maintain and operate. In 2006, total installed capacity was only 270 MW, of which about 70% was thermal and 30% hydroelectric. There are currently three large thermal plants and one hydroelectric plant serving the metropolitan area and some smaller thermal and hydroelectric plants in the provinces. The most important plants are:

- Péligre, an hydroelectric plant with 54 MW of installed capacity. However, its actual power varies between 30 MW in the rainy season and 10 MW in the dry one.
- Carrefour, a 50 MW thermal plant with just 12 MW of actually available capacity.
- Varreux 1 and 2, two thermal plants with installed capacities of 33 MW and 21 MW respectively which can just provide 12.5 MW.

The large difference between installed and available capacity stems from serious maintenance deficiencies which have led, for example, to just one quarter of hydroelectric capacity to be available. The repairs carried out in Varreux and Carrefour should allow for 15 MW of additional capacity.

Generation in 2003 was 550 GWh, with 54% coming from thermal sources and the remaining from hydroelectric ones.

=== Demand ===
In 2003, total electricity consumption in Haiti was 510 GWh, Average per capita consumption in 2004 was 75 kWh, the lowest in the LAC region. The share for each sector is as follows:

- Residential: 60%
- Industrial: 20%
- Transport: 15%
- Services: 5%

=== Demand vs supply ===
The Haitian electricity sector has a national installed capacity that is largely insufficient to meet a demand of 157 MW in Port-au-Prince and of 550 MW at the national level. This electricity shortage has created a situation in which tens of thousands of households and institutions (e.g. hospitals, schools) have to rely on their own diesel generators and as a result spend large portions of their income on fuel to run those generators. In order to partially address this deficit, the government has signed contracts with Sogener, Haytrac and Epower which are private power suppliers, for a total of about 135 MW.

For the medium and long term, according to recent estimates, Haiti needs about 200 MW of new generation capacity by the year 2010 and up to 750 MW by 2020.

== Access to electricity ==
In Haiti, only 38.5% of the population have access to electricity “officially”, although the Ministry of Public Works estimate that the coverage could be higher when irregular connections are considered. In the Urban areas the total electrification rate is 60% (2019 est.) but only 12% in rural areas.

Some towns in Haiti, such as Fort-Liberté, the capital of Nord-Est, have an electricity distribution network, but have been effectively abandoned by the national utility EdH for about a decade. Users thus have to rely entirely on small, privately owned generators to meet their electricity demand.

== Service quality ==
=== Interruption frequency and duration ===
Those who have access to electricity received on average 10 hours of electricity a day, with disparities among the areas covered. People have freezers and refrigerators to cool food, not to preserve it. These coolers consume too much electricity to run off batteries, for those who can afford them. Therefore, they are disconnected when the power is off.

=== Distribution and transmission losses ===
The public utility Electricité d’Haïti (EDH), a member of Caribbean Electric Utility Services Corporation (CARILEC), suffers from high inefficiencies, with more than 75% estimated technical and commercial system losses. This high percentage results from improper maintenance due to lack of financing; triggering incidents (e.g. fires); theft; obsolescence of information systems, which prevents proper identification of customers, billing and accounting and in turn impacts quality of service and losses. The ratio of energy unpaid to energy produced is among the highest in the world, with an estimated 35% of the energy produced being stolen. Many residents cannot afford the high costs of electricity, so resort to stealing.

EDH's financial situation is precarious. Utility bills cover less than 50% of electricity generated. In some cases, third parties install transformers to steal electricity from EDH high voltage lines and charge consumers for the stolen electricity. The combined losses require an annual subsidy from the Government of Haiti of $120 million to maintain operations.

== Responsibilities in the electricity sector ==
=== Policy and regulation ===
The institutional framework of the electricity sector in Haiti is weak. The entity in charge of the energy sector is the Ministry of Public Works, Transports and Communications (MTPTC). The minister is also the president of the executive board of the state-owned power company, EdH (Haiti Electricity Company). The board of directors of EdH, which had not met for many years, began to meet again beginning in September 2005 (although recent meetings have not happened), aiming at better transparency for the management of the public utility.

However, the elimination of the secretary for energy, mines and telecommunications (SEEMT) in 2005 deprived the government of the technical capacity required to address the crisis in the electricity sector.

The Council of Modernization of Public Enterprises (CMEP), which was created as a technical entity to oversee the reform process of public enterprises, is officially in charge of following up on the medium term program to rehabilitate EDH.

=== Generation, transmission and distribution ===
Electricité d’Haïti (EdH) holds the monopoly for electricity generation, transmission and distribution in the country. However, as a result of the inability of EdH to meet the electricity demand, the private sector has been present for ten years in the generation subsector through private power suppliers who sell their electricity to EdH at an agreed price. After the expiration of the existing contract with Alstom, Sogener is currently the only IPP that generates and sells electricity to EdH.

== Renewable energy resources ==
Besides hydroelectric generation, which accounts for about 26% of total installed capacity, no other renewable sources are being exploited for electricity generation in Haiti.

=== Hydroelectricity ===
A project for a new 32 MW hydroelectric plan (Artibonite 4C) is on implementation phase. This new plant would have 10 MW of guaranteed capacity and would cost about US$120 million. The Brazilian Army made the base project and it was already donated to the Haitian Government.

=== Wind ===
Haiti presents an interesting wind potential. Haiti's Wind Potential Atlas has revealed a potential capacity of 50 MW in the area of Lake Azueï (close to Port-au-Prince) alone.

=== Solar ===
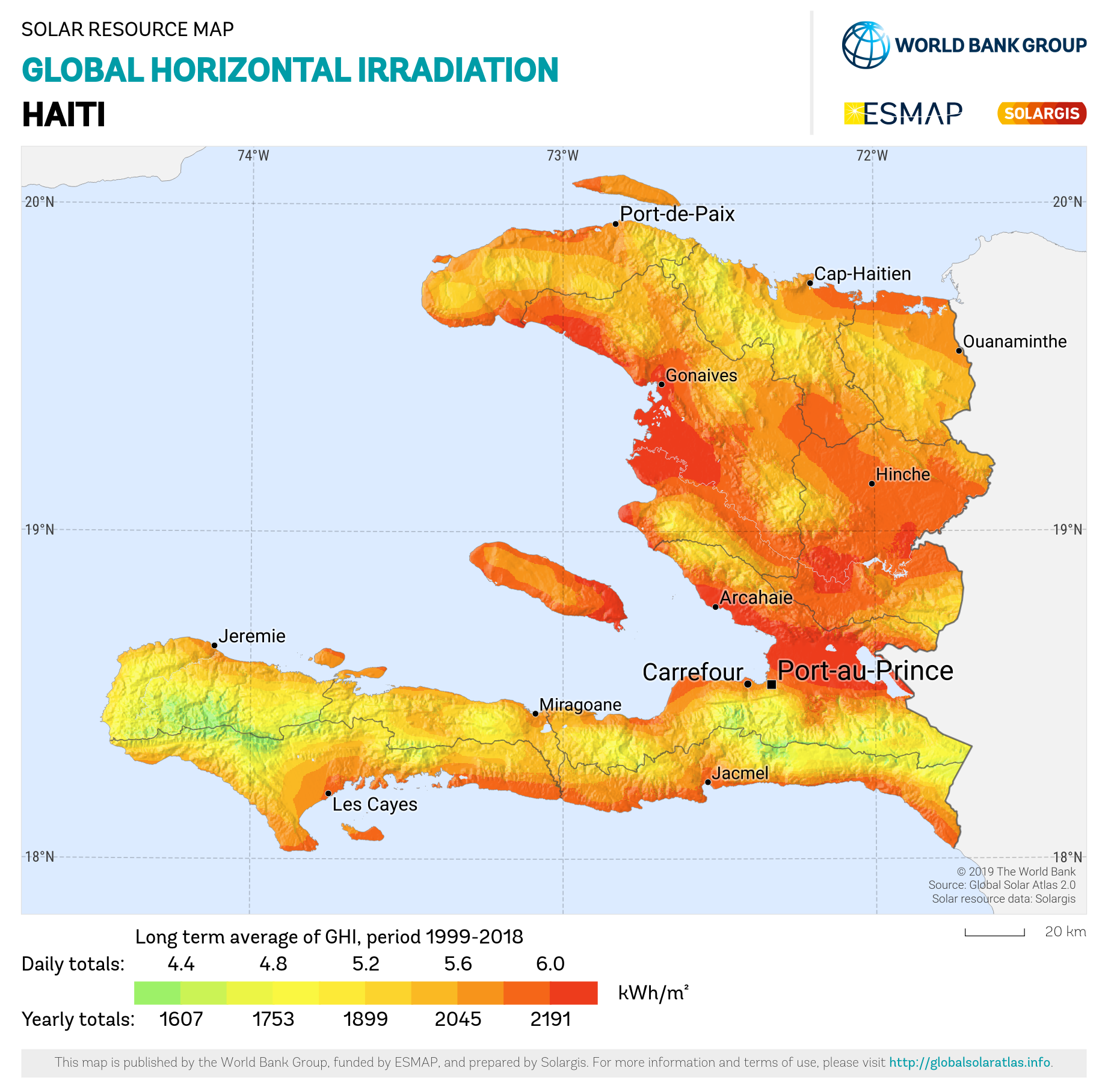
Solar potential

In Haiti, the concept of Solar electricity was embraced by Hôpital Universitaire de Mirebalais, featuring 1,800 solar panels. Rural electrification projects could apply off-grid solar technology. Since only about 13% of the people even have grid access, distributed solar pv is the only energy source that can supply all the people electricity for now.

== History of the electricity sector ==
=== History ===
Haiti has limited energy resources: no petroleum or gas resources, small hydroelectricity potential and rapidly declining supplies of wood fuels. With very limited access to electricity, most of the population in Haiti depends on charcoal as a source of energy.

The National Electricity Company (Electricité d’Haïti – EDH) was created in 1971 to operate the newly built Péligre hydroelectric plant and the nation's power system. Electricity consumption increased sixfold between 1970 and 1987, but just 10% of the population had access to electricity by 1986, a number that, if not accounting for illegal connections, has not varied much in the last 20 years. In the late 1980s, installed capacity was estimated at 147 MW (compared with 240 MW in 2003).

The Organic Law from the 20th of August 1989 defined EDH's responsibilities. EdH administers the hydroelectric plants (Péligre, Guayamouc and other smaller ones), the thermal plants (Varreux and Carrefour), other small generators and the distribution system. However, the system remains largely dysfunctional, with no power links between the capital and the provincial cities, or between provincial cities, and with unpredictable generation due to fluctuating supplies of imported petroleum and hydroelectricity shortfalls in the dry seasons. This situation leads to frequent energy rationing in which large businesses and residential users are forced to rely on expensive back-up generators. In order to try to overcome its financial problems, EDH charges high electricity tariffs (the highest in the Caribbean in the 1980s). As a result, many people established illegal connections (one in four urban residents as per estimates at the end of the 1980s), a practice that has prevailed ever since.

=== 2000s developments ===
In March 2004, following the resignation of President Jean-Bertrand Aristide, a transition government was created. This government, together with the donor community, prepared the Interim Cooperation Framework (ICF), which set a strategy for increasing political and social stability and promoting economic growth. This framework was to guide investments of the international community until September 2007. One of the top priorities laid out was the re-establishment of continuous electricity service. The progress assessment conducted by the ICF in the end of 2005, showed that only 25% of the objectives for the electricity sector had been met.

The electricity sector currently faces crucial problems: existence of a limited pool of experts, political interference, weakness in the institutional framework, fragmentation of the main actors and lack of strategic coordination and leadership. The lack of financial resources for maintenance, poor management practices, fraud and corruption and political interference lay at the core of these problems, which reflect into poor and unreliable provision of electricity services to end users, which in turn results in lack of willingness of affected consumers to pay for mediocre or often non-existent services.

After the election of René Préval as President of Haiti, the Ministry of Public Works, Transport and Communications (MTPTC) released in 2006 a draft Strategy for the Development of the Electricity Sub-Sector for the period 2006-2011. According to this strategy, in the medium to long term, EDH should undertake the following actions: (i) renovate the existing generation and distribution installations, (ii) construct medium-sized plants in the North, South and Artibonite regions when the interconnections are ready, (iii) build the national transmission network to connect the networks of the North, the Artibonite, the South, the West and the South, (iv) build a 120 to 260 MW oil-fired or coal-fired plant, and (v) undertake a vast rural and urban electrification program. However, priorities are not defined yet and financing for the implementation of the strategy is still to be obtained.

== Tariffs and subsidies ==
=== Tariffs ===
The average residential tariff in 2006 was US$0.176/kWh, which is considerably higher than the weighted averages for the LAC region (US$0.115/kWh). However, this average tariff is still lower than the price charged to EdH by the private producers (US$0.210/kWh and US$0.206/kWh for Alstom (before expiration of their contract) and Sogener respectively). In August 2009, the electricity tariff was increased to 12-14 HTG/kWh resp. US$0.30 - 0.35.

=== Subsidies ===
The inability of EdH to cover its operating expenses, has led the Haitian State, through the Ministry of Finance, to heavily subsidize the sector with transfers for the purchase of fuel and for the purchase of electricity from two independent power producers (IPPs). These payments, which represent 1% of GDP, have created an unsustainable fiscal burden for the government.

== Investment and financing ==
Investment in the electricity sector in Haiti has been very low. The combination of a culture of non-payment for electricity services, fairly high consumer tariffs, a low base of metered customers, a lack of support from the authorities to combat corruption and fraud, a weak anti-fraud unit in EdH and widespread electricity theft had led to extremely low levels of cost recovery, which in turn has resulted in an inefficient and decrepit electricity network and a high level of financial losses.

According to studies financed by different donors, some of which need to be updated, there is an important need for investment in generation, transmission and distribution. The estimates are:

- Generation: US$135 to US$395 million (including medium-term hydroelectricity projects)
- Transmission and distribution: US$55 million

In fact, investment in the transmission network is essential since there is almost no reliable network between the main production and consumption centers and the existing lines thus would not be able to transmit newly generated electricity to the consumers.

As part of its Strategy for the Development of the Electricity Sub-Sector, the Haitian government hopes to be able to undertake the rehabilitation and renovation of the electricity system in the capitals of the ten departments and in some other cities. The cost of this project has been estimated at US$42 million.

== Summary of private participation in the electricity sector ==
Electricité d’Haïti (EdH) holds the monopoly for electricity generation, transmission and distribution in the country. However, as a result of the inability of EdH to meet the electricity demand, the private sector has been present for ten years in the generation subsector through private power suppliers who sell their electricity to EdH at an agreed price. After the expiration of the existing contract with Alstom, Sogener is currently the only IPP that generates and sells electricity to EdH. Currently, 23% of generation capacity is in private hands.

Activity	Private participation (%)
Generation	23%
Transmission	0%
Distribution	0%

== Electricity and the environment ==
=== Responsibility for the environment ===
The Ministry of the Environment (MDE), created in 1994, is the institution in charge of promoting sustainable development and support the conservation of the environment.

=== Greenhouse gas emissions ===
OLADE (Latin American Energy Organization) estimated that CO_{2} emissions from electricity production in Haiti in 2003 were 206,000 tons of CO_{2}, which corresponds to 12% of total emissions from the energy sector.

=== Clean Development Mechanism projects in electricity ===
Currently (November 2007), there aren’t any CDM projects in Haiti.

== External assistance ==
External assistance from donors is essential for the improvement of the electricity sector in Haïti considering the lack of auto-financing on the part of EdH and insufficient local skills.

=== World Bank ===
The World Bank is providing US$6 million grant for an Electricity Loss Reduction Project (PREPSEL) This is a three-year pro project whose main objectives are: (i) install new commercial and technical service systems for the EdH and (ii) carry out investments in networks and commercialization in one zone of Port-au-Prince and for the large customers of EdH (accounting for 70% of revenues). Implementation of this project is being coordinated with the IDB's project through a shared Project Coordination Unit.

The Haiti Economic Governance Reform Operation II (EGRO II), for which the World Bank has committed a US$23 million grant, includes two conditions that are related to the electricity sector: (i) the government should publish a monthly dashboard to monitor financial transfers from the State to the electricity sector and contracts (achieved), (ii) the government and EDH cannot sign new contracts (and amendments) without a competitive bidding process.

=== Inter-American Development Bank ===
The Inter-American Development Bank (IDB) is implementing the US$18 million Rehabilitation of the Electricity Distribution System in Port-au-Prince project This project is a follow-up of the World Bank's PREPSEL project. It will apply the PREPSEL approach in another zone of Port-au-Prince, benefiting from the two systems (Customer Management System - CMS - and Technical Service Management System - TSMS -) installed by PREPSEL for EdH. The IDB project will also finance the implementation of the Resource Management System (accounting system for EdH).

In December 2007, the IDB approved a US$750,000 technical cooperation donation for the design of EDH's Mid-Term Investment Plan. The objective of the Program is to identify the necessary activities at the feasibility level that are required to rehabilitate and efficiently operate the Peligre Hydroelectric Dam. The rehabilitation would include the refurbishment of electro-mechanic components and the main electricity-generating equipment.

=== Canadian International Development Agency ===
The Canadian International Development Agency's (CIDA) main project in Haiti has been the Jacmel Model Transfer project, which consists in the creation of the semi-autonomous center in Jacmel. The agency is currently financing the strengthening of the Jacmel center (US$4 million), which will undergo works for rehabilitation in generation, transmission and distribution. The success of this project provided Jacmel with 24 hours of electricity a day, an achievement that is currently facing difficulties.

In addition, CIDA plans to replicate the Jacmel model to Les Cayes (US$16.2 million). It is also financing the repair of the Saut Mathurine micro-hydro plant and part of the Bourdet hydro plant, both near Les Cayes, for US$4.3 million

=== United States Agency for International Development ===
The United States Agency for International Development USAID has provided US$4.5 million for the rehabilitation of four micro-electricity plants: Drouet, Délugé, Caracol and Onte Verde. This project is to be executed in the period 2007-2008.

== Sources ==
- Ministère des Travaux Publics, Transports et Communications, 2006. Stratégie de développement du sous-secteur de l’Electricité en Haïti
- World Bank, 2006. Electricity loss reduction project. PAD

== See also ==
- Haiti
- Economy of Haiti
- Water supply and sanitation in Haiti
- History of Haiti
