= Ministry of Commerce and Industry (disambiguation) =

The Ministry of Commerce and Industry, or Ministry of Trade and Industry, is a type of department in many governments.

Ministry of Commerce and Industry may also refer to:

- Ministry of Commerce and Industry (Haiti)
- Ministry of Commerce and Industry (India)
- Ministry of Commerce and Industry (Japan)
- Ministry of Commerce and Industry (Kuwait)
- Ministry of Commerce and Industry (Oman)

== See also ==
- Minister of Commerce and Industry (disambiguation)
- Commerce minister
- Industry minister
