= Minister of National Education =

Minister of National Education can refer to:

- Ministry of National Education (Colombia)
- Minister of National Education (France)
- Ministry of National Education (Haiti)
- Minister of National Education (Poland)
- Minister of National Education (Romania)
- Minister of National Education (South Africa)
- Minister of National Education (Turkey)
