= Council of Sages =

Advisory body to the president of Haiti (2004–2006)

The Council of Sages (French: Conseil des sages, also Council of Experts) was an advisory body to the president of Haiti formed in the aftermath of the 2004 Haitian coup d'état. Its seven members were appointed by a joint commission of ousted president Jean-Bertrand Aristide's Fanmi Lavalas party, the Haitian opposition, the United Nations, and the Organization of American States. Its composition was made up of experts who were meant to represent different segments of Haitian society.

The council had two responsibilities: to recommend an interim prime minister to the interim president Boniface Alexandre, and to advise the prime minister on the selection of their cabinet. After the inauguration of the prime minister's new government, the Council of Sages would transform into a Council of State that would consult the president as a body of oversight. However, a Council of State was never formed and the mandate of the Council of Sages was automatically terminated when René Préval succeeded Alexandre as president following the 2006 general election.

== Formation and membership ==
The United Nations (UN) and the Organization of American States (OAS) formed the Council of Sages on 5 March 2004, in the aftermath of the 29 February coup d'état that ousted Haitian president Jean-Bertrand Aristide. The council's seven members were intended to be experts who represented significant players in Haitian society, jointly selected by the UN, OAS, Aristide's Fanmi Lavalas party, and opponents of Aristide. They were Lamartine Clermont (Catholic Church), Ariel Henry (Democratic Convergence, opposition), Anne-Marie Issa (private sector), Macdonald Jean (Episcopal Church), Danielle Magloire (human rights groups), Christian Rousseau (academics), and Paul-Emile Simon (Fanmi Lavalas). Twenty other advisors from civil society also worked with the core seven members of the council.

== Mandate ==
The council was an advisory body, and the UN and OAS delegated it only two tasks. The council was to first recommend an interim prime minister (who could not be on the council) to the interim president appointed after the coup, Boniface Alexandre. The council nominated Gérard Latortue to be interim prime minister on 9 March, and Latortue took office shortly afterward on 12 March. The council's second task was to advise Latortue on the selection of his cabinet, the inauguration of which would trigger the council's transformation into the Council of State, a new advisory body to Alexandre that would act as oversight between civil society and the executive. However, this never happened and the Council of Sages was automatically dissolved when René Préval succeeded Alexandre as president on 14 May 2006, after Préval was elected to a second term earlier that year on 7 February.

== See also ==
- Group of 184, opposition coalition against President Jean-Bertrand Aristide
- Transitional Presidential Council, formed in 2024 amid the Haitian political crisis
