= Ministry of Agriculture, Natural Resources and Rural Development (Haiti) =

Government minister of Haiti

- Coat of arms of Haiti

Agency overview
- Jurisdiction: Republic of Haiti
- Minister responsible: Vernet Joseph
- Child agency: National Meteorological Center
- Website: http://www.agriculture.gouv.ht/

The Ministry of Agriculture, Natural Resources and Rural Development (French: Ministère de l'Agriculture, des Ressources naturelles et du Développement rural, MARNDR) is a ministry of the Government of Haiti.

This ministry is responsible for Agriculture, Natural Resources and Rural Development along with playing an integral role in the Prime Minister's Cabinet.

== See also ==
- List of Agriculture ministers of Haiti
