= Kathia Verdier =

Haitian politician (born 1994)

- Kathia Verdier in 2026

Minister of Haitians Living Abroad
- Incumbent
- Assumed office 16 November 2024
- Prime Minister: Alix Didier Fils-Aimé (acting)
- Preceded by: Dominique Dupuy

Personal details
- Born: 1994 (age 31–32) Port-au-Prince, Haiti

Kathia Verdier (born 20 March 1994) is a Haitian politician, Minister of Haitians Living Abroad since 2024.

== Early life ==
Verdier was born in 1994 in Port-au-Prince, Haiti. She has completed courses in governance and public administration, specializing in communication, as well as in NGO management, finance, accounting, and international trade.

== Career ==
Verdier has worked for several companies, some of which she founded and foundations. She led the association Action Socio-Cultural for a Secure Tomorrow in Haiti (AS-LAH) and founded the National Association for Aquatic Resource Management and Protection (ANAEPA).

On 15 November 2024, Verdied was announced as the new Minister of Haitians Living Abroad of the transitional cabinet of Alix Didier Fils-Aimé. She was sworn in on 16 November. Kathia Verdier has launched an initiative to provide identity documents to members of the Haitian diaspora, with the aim of facilitating the exercise of their rights as citizens.

Under her leadership, the Ministry was given an organic law, after thirty-one years of operating without a legal framework. In December 2025, she also officially launched the Diaspora Mapping project.
