= List of education ministers of Haiti =

This page is a list of Haitian education ministers.

The educational sector is under the responsibility of the Ministre de l'Éducation Nationale et de la Formation Professionnelle (MENFP). Minister of Public Instruction overseeing public education was first created in Haiti in 1843.

== List of ministers of education of Haiti ==
Ministers (various titles) of public instruction of Haiti, 1844–2016.

| Minister | Began | Ended |
|---|---|---|
| Jean-Auguste Voltaire | 4 April 1843 | 7 January 1844 |
| Jacques Honoré Féry | 7 January 1844 | 18 February 1845 |
| Alexis-Beaubrun Ardouin | 18 February 1845 | 2 March 1846 |
| Alphonse Larochel | 2 March 1846 | 27 July 1847 |
| Joseph François | 27 July 1847 | 30 September 1847 |
| Damien Delva | 30 September 1847 | 9 April 1848 |
| Jean-Baptiste Francisque | 9 April 1848 | 14 February 1851 |
| Lysius Salomon | 14 February 1851 | 15 January 1859 |
| André Jean-Simon | 17 January 1859 | 9 February 1860 |
| Elie Dubois | 9 February 1860 | 10 August 1861 |
| Valmé Lizaire | 10 August 1861 | 8 July 1862 |
| Jean-Baptiste Damier | 8 July 1862 | 2 April 1866 |
| Thomas Madiou | 2 April 1866 | 7 March 1867 |
| Septimus Rameau | 7 March 1867 | 13 March 1867 |
| Ultimo Lafontant | 8 May 1867 | 21 July 1867 |
| Demesvar Delorme | 21 July 1867 | 10 February 1868 |
| Numa Rigaud | 10 February 1868 | 20 May 1868 |
| Alexandre Floren | 20 May 1868 | 3 August 1868 |
| Hilaire Jean-Pierre | 3 August 1868 | 19 February 1869 |
| Charles Archin | 19 February 1869 | 6 September 1869 |
| Dasny Labonté | 6 September 1869 | 29 December 1869 |
| Septimus Rameau | 29 December 1869 | 23 March 1870 |
| Saint-Ilmond Blot | 23 March 1870 | 7 May 1870 |
| Benomy Lallemand | 7 May 1870 | 27 April 1870 |
| Thomas Madiou | 27 April 1870 | 29 Jun 1871 |
| Désilus Lamour | 29 Jun 1871 | 2 January 1872 |
| Octavius Rameau | 2 January 1872 | 15 Jun 1874 |
| Thomas Madiou | 15 Jun 1874 | 15 April 1876 |
| Thimogène Lafontant | 24 April 1876 | 20 July 1876 |
| Sauveur Faubert | 20 July 1876 | 25 November 1876 |
| Armand Thoby | 25 November 1876 | 23 August 1877 |
| Dalbémar Jean-Joseph | 23 August 1877 | 17 July 1878 |
| Charles Archin | 17 July 1878 | 17 August 1879 |
| Adelson Douyon | 1 September 1879 | 3 October 1879 |
| Numa Rigaud | 3 October 1879 | 3 November 1879 |
| Thimogène Lafontant | 3 November 1879 | 23 January 1880 |
| Charles Archin (third times) | 23 January 1880 | 26 August 1881 |
| François Denys Légitime (interim) | 26 August 1881 | 31 December 1881 |
| François Manigat | 31 December 1881 | 28 April 1884 |
| Brenor Prophète (interim) | 28 April 1844 | September 1884 |
| François Manigat | September 1884 | 15 May 1887 |
| Hugon Lechaud | 15 May 1887 | 10 August 1888 |
| Etienne Erystale Claude | 1 September 1888 | 1888 |
| Roche Grellier | 19 December 1888 | 25 April 1889 |
| Solon Ménos | April 25, 1889 | May 31, 1889 |
| Alix Rossignol | 31 May 1889 | 20 June 1889 |
| Néré Numa | 20 June 1889 | 29 October 1889 |
| Dantes Rameau | 29 October 1889 | 19 August 1891 |
| MacDonald Apollo | August 19, 1891 | August 19, 1892 |
| Edmond Lespinasse (a. I) | August 19, 1892 | October 7, 1892 |
| MacDonald Apollo (2nd | times) | October 7, 1892 | December 27, 1894 |
| Thimocles Labidou | 27 December 1894 | 6 April 1896 |
| Jean-Joseph Chancy | 6 April 1896 | 15 December 1897 |
| Carméleau Antoine | 13 December 1897 | 17 August 1899 |
| Luxembourg Cauvin | 17 August 1899 | 9 November 1900 |
| Gédéus Gédéon | November 9, 1900 | May 12, 1902 |
| Cadet Jérémie | May 20, 1902 | December 22, 1902 |
| Utimo Saint-Amand | December 22, 1902 | April 4, 1903 |
| Auguste Bonamy | April 4, 1903 | June 30, 1903 |
| Antoine Augustin | June 12, 2024 | Incumbent |
