= Ministry of Public Works, Transport and Communications (Haiti) =

Government minister of Haiti

- Coat of arms of Haiti

Agency overview
- Jurisdiction: Republic of Haiti
- Minister responsible: Joseph Almathe Pierre-Louis
- Child agency: National Laboratory of Building and Construction of Haiti
- Website: http://www.mtptc.gouv.ht/

The Ministry of Public Works, Transport and Communications (French: Ministère des Travaux Publics Transports et Communications, MTPTC)is a ministry of the Government of Haiti. This ministry is responsible for Public Works, Transport and Communications and is part of the Prime Minister's Cabinet.

== See also ==
- Electricity sector in Haiti
