= Minister of Commerce and Industry =

Minister of Commerce and Industry could refer to:

- Minister of Commerce and Industries (Afghanistan)
- Minister of Commerce and Industry (France)
- Minister of Commerce and Industry (India)

== See also ==
- Ministry of Commerce and Industry (disambiguation)
