= Ministry of Public Works, Transportation and Communications (Haiti) =

Government minister of Haiti

- Coat of arms of Haiti

Agency overview
- Jurisdiction: Government of Haiti
- Minister responsible: Raphaël Hosty
- Website: http://www.mtptc.gouv.ht/

The Ministry of Public Works, Transportation and Communications is a ministry of the Government of Haiti. This ministry is responsible for Public Works, Transportation and Communications as part of the Prime Minister's Cabinet.

== See also ==
- List of Public Works ministers of Haiti
