= Dr. Louis G. Lamothe Foundation =

The Dr. Louis G. Lamothe Foundation (French: La Fondation Dr Louis G. Lamothe (FLGL)) aims to promote social dialogue. Launched on 18 December 2015, by Laurent Lamothe, former Prime Minister of Haiti in the name of his father, the foundation hopes to expose citizens to information and the concept of social responsibility so that they can make a contribution to the dialogue, exchange of knowledge and the social transformation of their own country. It aims to create a favourable environment for the development of social entrepreneurship. It is based in Port-au-Prince, Haiti.
