= Dominique Dupuy (politician) =

Haitian diplomat

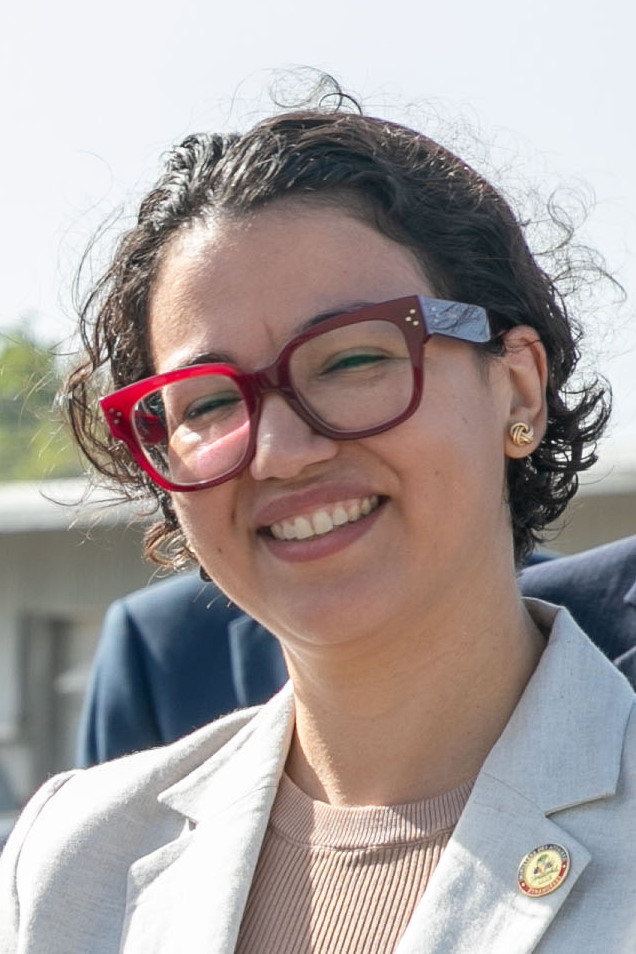
- Dupuy in 2024

Minister of Foreign Affairs, Religious Affairs, and Haitians Living Abroad
- In office June 12, 2024 – November 16, 2024
- Prime Minister: Garry Conille (acting)
- Preceded by: Jean Victor Généus
- Succeeded by: Kathia Verdier (Haitians Living Abroad)

Member of Transitional Presidential Council
- In office March 20, 2024 – March 26, 2024
- Prime Minister: Michel Patrick Boisvert (acting)
- Preceded by: Office created
- Succeeded by: Smith Augustin

Permanent Delegate of Haiti to UNESCO
- In office November 17, 2020 – March 2024
- Prime Minister: Claude Joseph; Ariel Henry (Acting)

Personal details
- Born: 23 March 1990 (age 36) Cap-Haitien, Haiti
- Children: 1
- Education: McGill University

Dominique Dupuy (born on March 23, 1990) is a Haitian diplomat and politician who was Minister of Foreign Affairs, Religious Affairs, and Haitians Living Abroad from 12 June to 16 November 2024.

== Early life ==
Dominique Dupuy was born in Cap-Haitien in 1990. She attended Vanier College in Montreal before graduating from McGill University in Montreal in 2012, obtaining a bachelor's degree in international development. She had an exchange semester in Lancaster University in 2011.

== Career ==
In 2020, Dupuy was nominated by president Jovenel Moïse to serve as the Haitian permanent representative to UNESCO in Paris.

On 27 October 2023, Haiti was elected to a vice-presidency of the UNESCO Executive Board, which Dupuy represented. Upon taking office, she chose to deliver her first speech in Haitian Creole. In February 2024, she proposed the inscription of compas, a Haitian style of dance.

In 2024, she was nominated by EDE/RED-Historic Compromise to serve on the Transitional Presidential Council, on March 20, to replace Marie Ghislaine Mompremier, but resigned on March 26, 2024, citing death threats and concerns to her personal safety.

On June 12, 2024, Dupuy was nominated by acting Prime Minister Garry Conille to serve as Minister of Foreign Affairs, Religious Affairs, and Haitians Living Abroad. On July 3, 2024, Dupuy met with United States Secretary of State Antony Blinken in Washington with Prime Minister Conille.

== Personal life ==
In addition to her native French and Haitian Creole, Dupuy speaks English and Spanish fluently. She has a daughter with her husband Jean Cyril Pressoir.

== See also ==
- White Haitians
