= Smith Augustin =

Haitian diplomat and politician

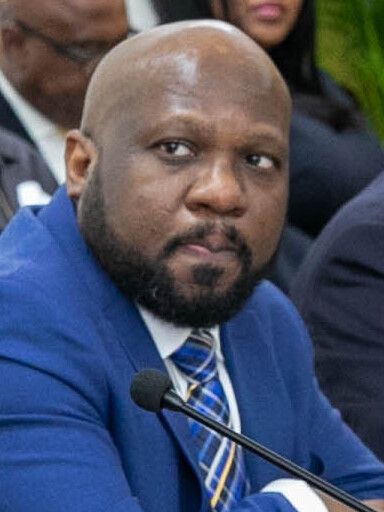
- Augustin in 2024

Member of Transitional Presidential Council
- In office March 26, 2024 – February 7, 2026
- Prime Minister: Michel Patrick Boisvert (Acting); Garry Conille (Acting); Alix Didier Fils-Aime (Acting)
- Preceded by: Dominique Dupuy

Personal details
- Education: Santo Domingo Institute of Technology; Nantes University; Université Laval

Smith Augustin is a Haitian diplomat and politician who serves as a member of the Transitional Presidential Council. Prior to his tenure on the council he was Haiti's ambassador to the Dominican Republic. He and two other members of the council have been accused of corruption.

== Early life and education ==
Augustin graduated from the Santo Domingo Institute of Technology with a degree in philosophy and social sciences in 2009, and from Nantes University with a Master's degree in international fundamental rights law in 2013. He graduated from Université Laval, with a doctoral studies in sociology and was an assistant professor there.

== Career ==
=== Diplomacy ===
In the United Nations Augustin was a National Human Rights Officer from 2009 to 2014. Augustin was Haiti's ambassador to the Dominican Republic from 2020 to 2022.

A group of fifteen Haitian journalists travelled to the Dominican Republic from 5 to 7 March 2021, under the leadership of diplomat Edwin Paraison. During their trip some members of the delegation were provided sex workers by Augustin. Using sex workers in the Dominican Republic, where prostitution is not regulated, to gain journalist support dates back to the Duvalier family's dictatorship.

=== Politics ===
In 2021, Augustin stated that he was not a part of the Haitian Tèt Kale Party. On 24 March 2024, he replaced Dominique Dupuy as a member of the Transitional Presidential Council with the nomination of EDE/RED-Historic Compromise. In July 2024, Augustin represented Haiti to attend the opening ceremony of 2024 Summer Olympics.

The Anti-Corruption Unit's report in October 2024 recommended legal action against Augustin, Louis Gérald Gilles, and Emmanuel Vertilaire. They were accused of receiving credit cards from Raoul Pascal Pierre-Louis, who was attempting to be reappointed to the National Credit Bank.

== Works cited ==
- "Former Haitian ambassador to the Dominican Republic joins Haiti's Transition Council". Dominican Today. 26 March 2024. Archived from the original on 22 June 2025.
- "Haiti - Paris 2024 Olympic Games : Presidential Advisor Smith Augustin in Paris". Haïti Libre. 26 July 2024. Archived from the original on 22 June 2025.
- "Investigators in Haiti accuse 3 members of transitional presidential council of corruption". Voice of America. 2 October 2024. Archived from the original on 22 June 2025.
- "Profile of next leader of Haiti's presidential council released". Prensa Latina. 12 July 2024. Archived from the original on 22 June 2025.
- Mérancourt, Widlore (7 October 2024). "Smith Augustin provided sex workers to journalists in 2021". AyiboPost. Archived from the original on 22 June 2025.
