= Scientific research in Haiti =

In Haiti, scientific research remains a very difficult undertaking. There are a number of reasons for this: on the one hand, the country lacks a genuine state science policy, and on the other, there is a crying shortage of qualified human resources to conduct research programs. Faced with one of the most disastrous economic, social and political situations on the planet, Haiti is unable to retain its researchers, scientists and academics. Furthermore, in both the public and private sectors, decisions are not based on the findings of scientific research. As a result, scientific research remains under-valued by both sectors and under-funded.

== Overview ==
In Haiti, research is essentially carried out at university level. The lack of financial resources is the main cause of this under-funding. A bibliometric analysis of researchers' output reveals a low level of publications by Haitian researchers. From 1900 to 2017, only 883 publications by Haitian researchers were found on the Web of Science, 80% of which were co-authored with international researchers. Searches carried out in the Scopus database on the performance of Haitian universities in terms of scientific publications found in journals ranked in the Web of Science, in order to determine Haiti's scientific ranking, reveal the presence of no Haitian universities in this ranking. None of the country's universities appear on the list of the best universities in Latin America in a ranking carried out by QS World University Ranking for the year 2023.

== Vision for the future ==
Despite the critical situation facing scientific research in Haiti, encouraging initiatives are being taken at both state and university levels to encourage researchers in their vocation. To support scientific research in Haiti, the Bank of the Republic of Haiti has created the BRH Research and Development Fund to encourage research initiatives deemed important for society, and to contribute to the strengthening of scientific production in the country.
