= Universal Learning Centre =

American non-profit organization

Universal Learning Centre (ULC) is a United States 501(c) organization founded in 2005 by Jacques M. Jean and is based in Allen, Texas. It is "focused on providing learning materials and access to information within developing countries."

== Libraries in Haiti ==
ULC has opened three libraries in Haiti. All are close to or on major thoroughfares in their towns and use the Dewey Decimal System.

=== Pilate, Nord ===
In December 2009, ULC opened the first public library outside of Port-au-Prince, Haiti in Pilate, Nord a town of 40,000. The library received a donation of 25,000 books from Fondation des Parlementaires Quebecois (FDPQ) based in Quebec, Canada. (FDPQ collects new and used books in Quebec province for Francophone countries.)

The 800 sq ft. facility was not large enough to hold all 25,000 books so 5,000 were loaned to local schools for their use. ULC- Pilate has 5,000 books circulating and over 640 registered borrowers. It typically has about 60 visitors a day during the school year; there are 15 schools within the town limits. It also provides programming and services such as story times and tutoring. ULC-Pilate also received refurbished computers from Harvard Medical School's Basic Science Partnership Program.

=== Ouanaminthe, Nord-Est ===
In February 2013, ULC opened the first public library in Ouanaminthe. This is a city of 100,000 including neighboring communities with many schools including a law school. FDPQ donated 13,300 books for this effort. The children's library is named in memory of Carole Lentine. (For comparison, the city of Boulder, Colorado has 100,000 residents. It has one main library plus 3 branches which contain 241,000 books and periodical literature (items such as magazines and newspapers).

=== Ferrier, Nord-Est ===
Also in February 2013, ULC opened its library in Ferrier, Nord-Est, a town of 13,000, This was stocked with 4,700 books from FDPQ. ULC is actively working to add Haitian Creole books to the libraries and is working with the bigger publishers in Haiti to make this happen. Author Edwidge Danticat has already donated her own works.
