= Ministry of Tourism (Haiti) =

Government minister of Haiti

- Coat of arms of Haiti

Agency overview
- Jurisdiction: Government of Haiti
- Minister responsible: Stéphanie Smith
- Website: http://www.haititourisme.gouv.ht/

The Ministry of Tourism (French: ministère du Tourisme) is a ministry of the Government of Haiti. This ministry is responsible for tourist attractions and accommodations for travelers, along with playing an integral role in the Prime Minister's Cabinet.
