= Université Caraïbe =

Coordinates: 18.5511°N 72.3086°W

Caribbean University
- Université Caraïbe
- Motto: Universalité, Compétence
- Established: 1988; 37 years ago
- Location: Port-au-Prince, Haiti
- Website: www.universitecaraibe.com/

The Université Caraïbe (French pronunciation: [ynivɛʁsite kaʁaib], Caribbean University) is a university located in Port-au-Prince, Haiti. It was founded in 1988 and is organized in six Faculties.

== Organization ==
These are the six faculties in which the university is divided into:

- Faculty of Education
- Faculty of Engineering
- Faculty of Agriculture
- Faculty of Management
- Faculty of Information science
- Faculty of Letters and Humanities
