= Ministry of Economy and Finance (Haiti) =

Government minister of Haiti

Ministère de l'Economie et des Finances (MEF)
- Coat of arms of Haiti

Agency overview
- Jurisdiction: Government of Haiti
- Headquarters: Port-au-Prince
- Motto: Le pari pour la modernité et la croissance
- Minister responsible: Serge Gabriel Collin
- Child agencies: Directorate General of Customs; National Port Authority
- Website: http://mef.gouv.ht

The Ministry of Economy and Finance (French: Ministère de l'Économie et des Finances, MEF) is a ministry of the Government of Haiti. This ministry is responsible for Economy and Finance along with providing support to the Prime Minister.

== See also ==
- List of finance ministers of Haiti
- Ministry of Finance and the Public Service (Jamaica)
- Ministry of Finance (Dominican Republic)
