= Ministry of Health (Haiti) =

Government minister of Haiti

Ministry of Public Health and Population
- Coat of arms of Haiti

Agency overview
- Jurisdiction: Government of Haiti
- Minister responsible: Duckenson Lorthé Blema
- Website: https://mspp.gouv.ht/

The Ministry of Public Health and Population (French: Ministère de la Santé publique et de la Population, MSPP) is a ministry of the Government of Haiti. This ministry is responsible for country-wide health and is part of the Prime Minister's Cabinet.

== See also ==
- List of Public Health ministers of Haiti
