= Gisou Lamothe =

Haitian painter and sculptor (1935–2020)

Ghislaine Lamothe
- Born: Ghislaine Fortuney; 1935; Port-au-Prince, Haiti
- Died: 15 August 2020 (aged 84–85)
- Other name: Gizou
- Occupation: Painter
- Spouse: Louis G. Lamothe
- Children: 2, including Laurent Lamothe

Ghislaine Fortuney Lamothe (1935 – 15 August 2020), also known as Gizou Lamothe, was a Haitian painter and sculptor. She was the mother of Haitian Prime Minister Laurent Lamothe.

Born Ghislaine Fortuney in Port-au-Prince in 1935, Lamothe studied in Madrid before returning to Haiti in 1961. Her works have been exhibited in South America, the United States, and Spain. She died on 15 August 2020.

== Sources ==
- Schutt-Ainé, Patricia (1994). Haiti: A Basic Reference Book. Miami, Florida: Librairie Au Service de la Culture. p. 114. ISBN 0-9638599-0-0.
