= Ministry of Planning and External Cooperation (Haiti) =

Government minister of Haiti

- Coat of arms of Haiti

Agency overview
- Jurisdiction: Government of Haiti
- Minister responsible: Sandra Paulemon
- Website: http://www.mpce.gouv.ht/

The Ministry of Planning and External Cooperation (French: ministère de la Planification et de la Coopération externe, MPCE) is a ministry of the Government of Haiti.

This ministry is responsible for international relations and is part of the Prime Minister's Cabinet.
