= Ministry of Commerce and Industry (Haiti) =

Government minister of Haiti

- Coat of arms of Haiti

Agency overview
- Jurisdiction: Government of Haiti
- Minister responsible: James Monazard
- Website: https://www.mci.gouv.ht/

The Ministry of Commerce and Industry (French: Ministère du Commerce et de l'Industrie, MCI) is a ministry of the Government of Haiti. This ministry is responsible for commerce and industry throughout the country, along with playing an integral role in the Prime Minister's Cabinet.

== See also ==
- List of Commerce ministers of Haiti
