= Ministry of National Education (Haiti) =

Government minister of Haiti

Ministry of National Education and Vocational Training
- Coat of arms of Haiti

Agency overview
- Formed: 1843
- Jurisdiction: Government of Haiti
- Headquarters: Port-au-Prince
- Minister responsible: Vijonet Déméro
- Website: http://menfp.gouv.ht/

The Ministry of National Education and Vocational Training (French: Ministère de l'Éducation nationale, et de la Formation Professionnelle, MENFP), or simply "Ministry of National Education," is a ministry of the Government of Haiti. This ministry is responsible for vocational training and education in Haiti, along with providing assistance to the Prime Minister.

== See also ==
- List of education ministers of Haiti
