= Ministry of the Environment (Haiti) =

Government minister of Haiti

- Coat of arms of Haiti

Agency overview
- Jurisdiction: Government of Haiti
- Minister responsible: Pierre Simon Georges

The Ministry of the Environment (French: ministère de l’Environnement, MdE) is a ministry of the Government of Haiti. This ministry is responsible for overseeing the environment and natural resources, along with performing an integral role in the Prime Minister's Cabinet.
