= Government of Haiti =

National government

The government of Haiti is a semi-presidential republic, a multi-party system wherein the President of Haiti is head of state elected directly by popular elections. The Prime Minister acts as head of government and is appointed by the President, chosen from the majority party in the National Assembly. Executive power is exercised by the President and Prime Minister who together constitute the government. Legislative power is vested in both the government and the two chambers of the National Assembly of Haiti. The government is organized unitarily, thus the central government delegates powers to the departments without a constitutional need for consent. The current structure of Haiti's political system was set forth in the Constitution of March 29, 1987.

As of early 2025, criminal gangs controlled at least 85% of the capital and its metropolitan area and had expanded into key regions. Since 2021, the country's government has been led by a prime minister appointed by the presidential transitional council, which failed in its attempt to call new elections and to contain the collapse of the country's democratic institutions.

== Government ==
The government of Haiti is a semi-presidential republic, a multiparty system wherein the President of Haiti is head of state elected directly by popular elections. The Prime Minister acts as head of government and is appointed by the President, chosen from the majority party in the National Assembly. Executive power is exercised by the President and Prime Minister who together constitute the government.

Legislative power is vested in both the government and the two chambers of the National Assembly of Haiti. The government is organized unitarily, thus the central government delegates powers to the departments without a constitutional need for consent. The current structure of Haiti's political system was set forth in the Constitution of Haiti on 29 March 1987. The current president is Alix Didier Fils-Aimé, acting since February 2026. In 2010, there were 7,000 people in the Haitian National Police.

The Institute for the Protection of National Heritage has preserved 33 historical monuments and the historic center of Cap-Haïtien.

The legal system for torts is based on a version of the Napoleonic Code.

In 2013, the annual budget was US$1 billion.

== History ==
=== 19th century ===
Jean-Jacques Dessalines was the first leader of free and independent Haiti under the 1805 constitution. He was initially regarded as governor-general, then later called himself Emperor Jacques I of Haiti. His regime lasted two and half years (1804-1806) and ended with his assassination by disaffected leaders of his administration. In 1806, Constituent Assembly created a new constitution and appointed Henri Christophe to a four-year term as President of the Republic of Haiti. The following year, the Battle of Sibert ended with the division of Haiti into the southern Republic of Haiti under Alexandre Pétion and the northern State of Haiti under Christophe. In 1818, Pétion died of a fever and Jean-Pierre Boyer, Chief of the Presidential Guard, was appointed President-for-Life of the Republic of Haiti. After Christophe committed suicide in 1820, Boyer promulgates the Republican Constitution in Christophe's northern state. This resulted in the unification of northern and southern Haiti. In 1822, Boyer arrives in Santo Domingo and declares control over the entire island of Hispaniola. Under Boyer, King Charles X of France signs an ordinance which conditionally recognizes Haiti's independence and imposes a 150 million franc indemnity on the Haitian government. This debt plagued Haiti's economy for generations. in 1843, President Boyer was overthrown and fled to Paris in exile. The 1843 Constitution was established and Charles Riviere-Hérard was appointed President of Haiti. Under Riviere-Hèrard, the Dominican Republic declared its independence from Haiti.

=== 20th century ===
In 1915, the United States Marines, led by Admiral William B. Caperton, entered Port-au-Prince and began the United States occupation of Haiti. The U.S. took over the collection of revenues and banks in Haiti for 19 years. American forces withdraw from Haiti in 1934 marking the end of the U.S. occupation. In 1957, François Duvalier, also known as "Papa Doc", was elected President of Haiti. In 1964, he declared himself president for life and established that his son, Jean-Claude Duvalier, known as "Baby Doc", would succeed him. During their regime, opposition to the government was not tolerated; thus, the Duvaliers used violence and terror to suppress the masses, killing about 30,000 Haitians. Finally, in 1986, a series of uprisings forced Baby Doc to flee Haiti for France. The Duvalier family stole millions of dollars during their administration, leaving Haiti in extreme debt today.

=== 21st century ===
On February 29, 2004, a coup d'état led by the Group of 184 ousted the popularly elected president, Jean-Bertrand Aristide, allegedly with the assistance of the French and United States governments; U.S. and French soldiers were on the ground in Haiti at the time, recently arrived (See controversy).

The first elections since the overthrow were held on February 8, 2006 to elect a new president. René Préval was declared to have won with over 50 percent of the vote. In 2008, Parliament voted to dismiss President Préval's prime minister following severe rioting over food prices. His selected replacement for the post was rejected by Parliament, throwing the country into a prolonged period without a government.

=== Today ===
Haiti is officially a semi-presidential republic. However, sources such as the Democracy Index have described Haiti as a hybrid or authoritarian regime in practice. Suffrage is universal, for adults over 18.

The constitution was rewritten by the United States to model those of the United States and of France. It was approved in March 1987, but it was completely suspended from June 1988 to March 1989 and was only fully reinstated in October 1994.

In May 2024, United Nations agencies reported that criminal groups control around 85 percent of Port-au-Prince, Haiti's capital and its metropolitan area. Having rapidly expanded into previously secure areas of the capital, the gangs have spread into key regions such as Haiti's agricultural areas the Ouest and Artibonite departments. Experts say the government does not have the capacity to take back control, despite support from an international security force including at least 800 Kenyan police officers.

== Branches of government ==
=== Executive branch ===
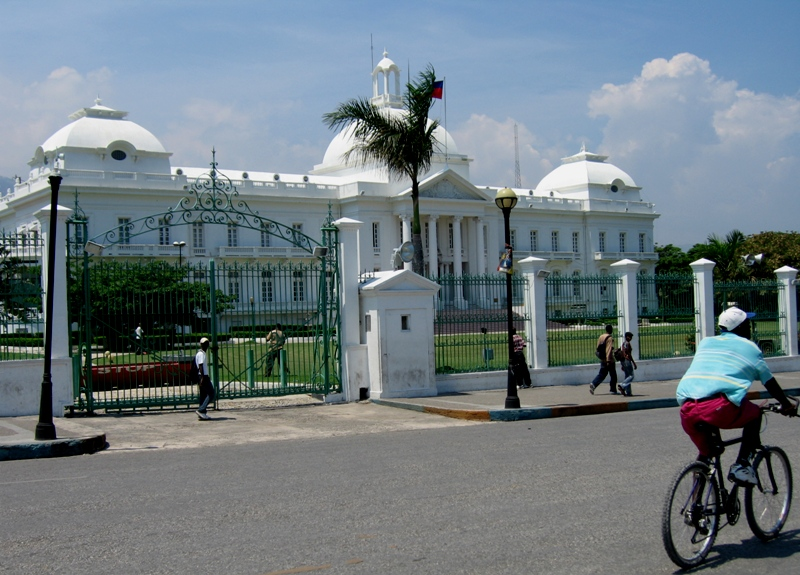
The National Palace in Port-au-Prince before being destroyed in the 2010 Haiti earthquake

Main office-holders
Office	Name	Party	Since
President	Alix Didier Fils-Aimé (acting)		7 February 2026
Prime Minister	Alix Didier Fils-Aimé (acting)		10 November 2024

Haiti's executive branch is composed of two parts, the presidency and the government. In this sense, "government" refers specifically to the portion of the executive branch outside of the presidency, and not to Haiti's political system as a whole.

==== President ====
The president is the head of state and elected by popular vote every five years for a five-year term, and may not serve consecutive terms. The last presidential election was held on 20 November 2016. The latest president was Jovenel Moïse until his assassination on 7 July 2021.

The president appoints the prime minister and his cabinet, which must be ratified by the National Assembly.

==== Cabinet ====
Haiti's cabinet, called Council of Ministers, is led by the Prime Minister, and includes other ministers.

The prime minister, the head of government, is appointed by the president and ratified by the National Assembly. He appoints the Ministers and Secretaries of State and goes before the National Assembly to obtain a vote of confidence for his declaration of general policy. The Prime Minister enforces the laws and, along with the President, is responsible for national defense.

The ministries of the Haitian government are:

- Ministry of Agriculture, Natural Resources and Rural Development
- Ministry of Commerce and Industry
- Ministry of Women's Affairs and Women's Rights
- Ministry of Culture and Communication
- Ministry of Defense
- Ministry of Economy and Finance
- Ministry of National Education and Vocational Training
- Ministry of Environment
- Ministry of Foreign Affairs and Worship
- Ministry of Haitians Living Abroad
- Ministry of Public Health and Population
- Ministry of Youth, Sports and Civic Action
- Ministry of Interior and Territorial Communities
- Ministry of Justice and Public Security
- Ministry of Planning and External Cooperation
- Ministry of Public Works, Transportation and Communications
- Ministry of Social Affairs and Labor
- Ministry of Tourism

=== Legislative branch ===
The bicameral National Assembly of Haiti (Assemblée Nationale) consists of the Chamber of Deputies (Chambre des Députés) and the Senate (Sénat). The Chamber of Deputies has ninety-nine members, who are elected by popular vote for four-year terms. The Senate consists of thirty members elected by popular vote to serve six-year terms, with one third elected every two years.

The last Senate elections were held on 28 November 2010 with run-off elections on 20 March 2011. The following Senate election, for one third of the seats, was to be held in 2012 but was not called. The last election of the Chamber of Deputies was held on 28 November 2010 with run-off elections on 20 March 2011. The next regular election of Deputies is to be held in 2014.

Prior to a 2002 territorial law which created a tenth department, the Chamber of Deputies had eighty three seats and the Senate had twenty-seven.

=== Judicial branch ===
The legal system is based on the Roman civil law system. Haiti accepts compulsory jurisdiction of the International Court of Justice. There is a Supreme Court (Cour de Cassation), assisted by local and civil courts at a communal level.

The Chief Justice of the Supreme Court, is in line to succeed the President in case of death or resignation, according to the 1987 Constitution of Haiti.

== Administrative divisions ==
For reasons of administration, Haiti has been divided into ten departments. Each department is divided into from three to seven arrondissements, and arrondissements are further divided into communes. The departments are listed below, with the departmental capital cities in parentheses.

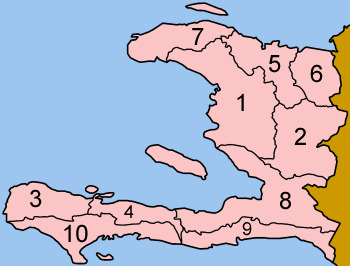
Departments of Haiti

1. Artibonite (Gonaïves)
2. Centre (Hinche)
3. Grand'Anse (Jérémie)
4. Nippes (Miragoâne)
5. Nord (Cap-Haïtien)
6. Nord-Est (Fort-Liberté)
7. Nord-Ouest (Port-de-Paix)
8. Ouest (Port-au-Prince)
9. Sud-Est (Jacmel)
10. Sud (Les Cayes)

The departments are further divided into 41 arrondissements, and 133 communes, which serve as second- and third-level administrative divisions.

== See also ==
- Politics of Haiti
