= Ariel Henry =

Haitian politician and neurosurgeon (born 1949)

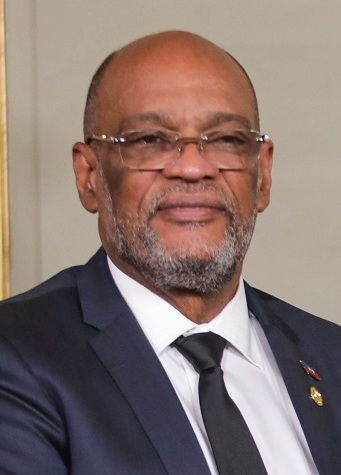
- Henry in 2023

Acting Prime Minister of Haiti
- In office 20 July 2021 – 24 April 2024
- Appointed by: Jovenel Moïse
- President: Vacant
- Preceded by: Claude Joseph (acting)
- Succeeded by: Michel Patrick Boisvert (acting)

Acting Minister of Interior and Territorial Communities
- In office 14 November 2022 – 24 April 2024
- Prime Minister: Himself (acting); Michel Patrick Boisvert (acting)
- Preceded by: Liszt Quitel
- Succeeded by: Garry Conille
- In office 22 January 2015 – 11 September 2015
- Prime Minister: Evans Paul
- Preceded by: Réginald Delva
- Succeeded by: Ardouin Zéphirin

Acting Minister of Culture and Communication
- In office 27 November 2021 – 11 January 2022
- Prime Minister: Himself (acting)
- Preceded by: Jean Emmanuel Jacquet
- Succeeded by: Emmelie Prophète

Minister of Social Affairs and Labor
- In office 11 September 2015 – 28 March 2016
- Prime Minister: Evans Paul; Fritz Jean
- Preceded by: Victor Benoît
- Succeeded by: Jean René Antoine Nicolas

Personal details
- Born: 6 November 1949 (age 77) Port-au-Prince, Haiti
- Party: Independent
- Other political affiliations: Inite; Fusion of Haitian Social Democrats; Haitian Revolutionary Progressive Nationalist Party; Social Democratic Party; Convergence Démocratique
- Spouse: Annie Claude Massiau
- Education: University of Montpellier (BS); Loma Linda University (MPH)

Ariel Henry (French pronunciation: [aʁjɛl ɑ̃ʁi]; born 6 November 1949) is a Haitian neurosurgeon and politician who served as the acting prime minister of Haiti after the assassination of Jovenel Moïse in 2021 until his resignation in 2024. During the period when the position of President of Haiti was vacant, executive authority was exercised by the Council of Ministers, which Henry presided over as acting prime minister. He also served as the acting minister of interior and territorial communities.

Henry refused to cooperate with the authorities regarding his connection to Joseph-Félix Badio, suspected of orchestrating the assassination of Moïse. Investigators thought that Henry might have been involved. On 11 March 2024, after the Transitional Presidential Council was created, he announced his resignation. Henry's outgoing cabinet appointed Minister of Finance and Economy Michel Patrick Boisvert as the interim prime minister.

== Early life and education ==
Henry was born on 6 November 1949 in Port-au-Prince to a family originally from the department of Artibonite. He served as a resident in neurosurgery with Professor Claude Gros in Montpellier, France from March 1977 to December 1981 and presented his doctoral thesis in January 1982. From 1981 to 1984, he studied neurophysiology and neuropathology at the University of Montpellier's faculty of medicine. He also received a certificate in performing electroencephalography from the University of Montpellier in September 1983.

Henry pursued further studies in the United States. In 1989, he completed a Master of Public Health in international health from Loma Linda University, and he carried out postdoctoral studies in international health management methods at Boston University from February to May 1990.

== Medical career ==
Henry was a professor at the Private Nursing School of Montpellier from September 1980 to June 1981. From January 1982 to December 1983, he was employed as an assistant in neurosurgery to Professor Claude Gros at the Gui de Chauliac university hospital in Montpellier. He also served as an assistant to Professor Philippe Frèrebeau at the same hospital from October 1983 to February 1985, and was employed as an assistant professor during his time there. He later served as the administrator of the Adventist Hospital of Haiti from March 1985 to June 1987.

Henry was employed as a neurosurgeon at the State University of Haiti Hospital from 1987 to 1996, while also serving as a professor of neurosurgery at the hospital from October 1985 to February 1995 and a professor of psychophysiology at the university's faculty of human sciences from November 1988 to June 1996. He has been a professor of neurology at the university's faculty of medicine since October 1990.

From December 1987 to January 2010, Henry was a consultant in neurosurgery and neurology at the Saint Vincent Centre for Disabled Children in Port-au-Prince. He was also a tutor at Loma Linda University's "Master of Public Health" program, which was held off-campus, from 1989 to 1991, and a professor of neurology at Quisqueya University from October 1999 to January 2010. He served as an advisor to the Minister of Health of Haiti from March 1993 to February 1995, as well as a consultant to the Pan American Health Organization and World Health Organization from 1993 to 1996.

Henry was the director of the Adventist Development and Relief Agency-Haiti's "Child Survival Project in Urban and Rural Areas" from November 1985 to February 1992, director of "Nutritional Rehabilitation Clinics" program from January 1986 to November 1989, deputy director of its overall programs from 1992 to 1996, and consultant for evaluating its "PL-480" program in 1998. He was also the director of health for the Adventist Church in Haiti, the French West Indies and French Guiana. From 1992 to 1999, he served as the chairman of the board of directors of the Ecumenical Welfare Society.

Henry served as an associate member of the French Society of Neurosurgery since 1984, a member of the National Committee to Evaluate Polio Eradication in Haiti since it was created in March 1990, and head of the neurosurgery department of the Bernard Mevs Hospital since October 2014. He led the public health response in the aftermath of the 2010 Haiti earthquake and the cholera outbreak in 2012. On 26 March 2020, President Jovenel Moïse chose him as a member of the 17-member scientific council tasked to fight the COVID-19 pandemic in Haiti.

== Political career ==
Henry entered politics as a leader of the Democratic Convergence movement which sought to topple President Jean-Bertrand Aristide, who was accused of rigging the 2000 Haitian parliamentary election. He and Micha Gaillard led the opposition against Aristide at international forums. After the 2004 coup d'état that ousted Aristide, Henry called for a transition government based on consensus and new elections. He later became a part of the "council of sages", consisting of seven members. The council was backed by the United States and elected members of the transitional government.

Henry supported René Préval after he was elected president and was appointed as the director general of the Ministry of Health in June 2006. He remained in the position until September 2008, when he was appointed as the ministry's chief of staff from September 2008 to October 2011. During his tenure, he dealt with the strikes at the General Hospital in Port-au-Prince, worked alongside the United States in managing the public health response after the 2010 earthquake, and streamlined the ministry's finances, enabling direct American funding of its programs.

Henry is a former member of the Social Democratic Party, the Haitian Revolutionary Progressive Nationalist Party which was founded by his long-time friend and political mentor Serge Gilles, Fusion of Haitian Social Democrats, and Inite. He was selected as the Minister of Interior and Territorial Communities in 2015 by President Michel Martelly, after the latter reached a deal with the opposition parties following anti-government protests, many of them led by followers of Aristide. Henry served in the post from 22 January 2015 to 11 September 2015, when he was appointed as the Minister of Social Affairs and Labor by Prime Minister Evans Paul and replaced by Ardouin Zéphirin. He remained in the position until 28 March 2016. After Inite announced it would withdraw from Martelly's unity government on 8 September 2015, it called on Henry to resign. Henry however refused and left the party.

On 5 July 2021, Henry was selected as the next prime minister of Haiti by President Jovenel Moïse, but two days later, Moïse was assassinated, stalling the transfer of power. At the time, acting Prime Minister Claude Joseph took control of the government, with the backing of the military, and was acknowledged by the United States as the rightful Prime Minister. A group of prominent diplomats to Haiti called the "Core Group", which is made up of ambassadors to Haiti from Brazil, the European Union, France, Germany, Spain, Canada and the United States, in addition to representatives to Haiti from the Organization of American States and the United Nations, called on Henry to take charge as the head of the government on 17 July. On 19 July, Joseph announced that he would stand down as acting prime minister in favor of Henry.

=== Acting Prime Minister of Haiti ===
Henry was sworn in as acting prime minister on 20 July 2021, it maintain the status quo that not approved by the National Assembly. During the ceremony, he called for unity and stated that he would prioritize reassuring people about restoring order and security in the country. He stated on 28 July that he planned to hold the long-delayed elections as soon as possible, and the government would hold dialogue with the civil society on what to do further for Haiti's progress. After an earthquake struck Haiti on 14 August, Henry declared a state of emergency for one month in the country and stated that all resources would be mobilized to help people affected by the quake. During an address to the Permanent Council of the Organization of American States on 20 August, he vowed to hold elections as soon as possible to restore democracy in the country, despite the country reeling from instability following the recent earthquake and Moïse's assassination.

On 6 September, Henry described reducing crime in Haiti as a primary concern of his government. He introduced the draft of a proposed new constitution on 8 September. Among its provisions, the president is given further powers while the position of prime minister is abolished to allow government policies to be passed more easily. Government officials, ministers and presidents can also be tried before courts once they leave their office. Henry signed an agreement for a consensual transitional government with opposition political parties on 11 September. Under the agreement, a new Provisional Electoral Council was formed which will include members of the Haitian diaspora in its functioning. Meanwhile, the government also agreed to hold a trial for the PetroCaribe scandal; in addition to conducting investigations into the massacres that occurred in La Saline, Bel Air and Delmas 32. The agreement contains provisions for the establishment of a two-headed executive of Haiti, while the country will be governed by the Council of Ministers under the leadership of Henry. It allows the elections to be delayed to late 2022. Over 169 political and civil organizations had signed the agreement until 12 September according to Henry, however he has sought support of more organizations.

At the 76th session of the United Nations General Assembly on 25 September, Henry spoke about the recent expulsion of Haitian migrants by the United States from its border with Mexico and stated that while he did not wish to challenge its right to expel illegal migrants, migration would continue until wealth inequality no longer existed in the world. He urged wealthy countries to help less-developed ones improve their living standards more quickly to prevent it, and criticized the United States Border Patrol agents for their conduct while stopping the Haitian migrants. Henry also stated that his government was trying to apprehend Moïse's killers and asked for "mutual legal assistance" before the assembly, while promising to restore democratic governance in Haiti quickly. Henry dismissed all members of the Provisional Electoral Council on 27 September. The elections were postponed indefinitely and he promised to appoint a new election council. The next day, Henry told the Associated Press that he planned to hold the constitutional referendum in February 2022, and hoped to hold the elections in early 2022. He also stated that the Haitian migrants recently expelled from the Mexico–United States border would be assisted by the government in setting up small businesses, and criticized the treatment meted out to them by the United States.

Henry named a new ministerial cabinet on 24 November, consisting of eight new appointments and appointing himself as the acting Minister of Culture and Communication. A 52-member National Transitional Council was named on 12 December under the "Montana Accord", a competing accord against Henry's own "September 11th Accord", being given the task of selecting a new president and prime minister until elections were held. On 1 January 2022, Henry fled Gonaïves after a shootout between his security forces and an unknown armed group. The attempt on his life occurred outside the cathedral in Gonaïves, where a ceremony marking the 218th anniversary of Haitian independence was taking place. The incident resulted in one death and two others were injured. Henry accused "bandits" of trying to assassinate him, and stated that the state should never bow to their demands. Delegates of various accords, including the Montana Accord, chose Fritz Jean as the interim President of Haiti on 17 January during a unitary summit. Henry however stated on Twitter that the next President would be elected by the Haitian people, apparently rejecting attempts at a transitional government. After the Montana Accord signatories chose Jean as the interim President and Steven Benoît as the Prime Minister in late January, Henry rejected giving recognition to it on 7 February. He also promised to announce the date of the elections soon, while his opponents demanded that he step down since the legal mandate of late President Jovenel Moïse, who had appointed him, formally expired that day.

In an interview with the Miami Herald on 11 February, Henry stated that he was willing to hand over suspects in the case of Moïse's assassination to the United States, as he supported their investigation into the former President's death and believed that the Ministry of Justice and Public Security was weak. He also stated that he supported appointing a judge from another country to oversee the case independently in Haiti and he would seek the assistance of the Caribbean Community for it. During the 2 June meeting of the Aid Effectiveness Committee of the Coordination Framework of external aid for the development of Haiti, Henry stated that improving the security situation in the country was a prerequisite for holding the elections. On 11 September, he stated that the government would begin the organization of elections by the end of 2022.

An announcement by Henry on 11 September regarding a reduction in subsidies on fuel, more than doubling the cost of petrol, diesel and kerosene, led to countrywide protests and gangs preventing fuel from being unloaded at the Varreux terminal, creating a nationwide shortage. On 5 October, Henry appealed to the international community for help in resolving the crisis. Two days later, he and the Council of Ministers authorized the government to request international military assistance. The G9 alliance of gangs announced the lifting of their blockade of the Varreux terminal on 11 November. Henry fired Justice Minister Berto Dorcé and Interior Minister Liszt Quitel on 14 November, three days after the Government Commissioner Jacques Lafontant was dismissed due to a complaint by Henry. Henry appointed himself as the acting Interior Minister, while Emmelie Prophète was appointed as the Justice Minister.

On 21 December 2022, Henry along with representatives of political parties, civil society organizations and the private sector signed an agreement to hold the general elections in 2023, with the new government taking office on 7 February 2024. It also established a three-member High Council for the Transition with powers to take part in appointment of government officials and overseeing the various government departments, along with a Government Action Control Body to ensure the compliance of the government with the rules and transparency. Protesting police officers attacked Henry's official residence and Toussaint Louverture International Airport on 26 January 2023, in response to a rise in killings of fellow officers. Henry, who was at the airport at the time, was able to escape. The High Council for the Transition was formally installed by him on 6 February 2023. In February 2024, however, he stated that the general elections will be held when the government was able to control the security situation in Haiti. The Caribbean Community later in the month said that he had committed to holding the elections by 31 August 2025.

=== Allegations of role in assassination of Jovenel Moïse ===
Henry was invited by Haiti's chief prosecutor Bedford Claude on 10 September 2021 for an interview regarding Moïse's assassination. Claude stated that Henry had been in contact with Joseph-Félix Badio, one of the main suspects on the day of the assassination. Henry, however, rejected giving permission on the next day, calling it a "diversionary tactic". Renan Hédouville, the head of the Office of Citizen Protection, demanded Henry's resignation on 13 September, and also called on him to cooperate with the investigation into Moïse's assassination. Claude on 14 September requested the judge investigating the assassination to charge Henry and told the immigration authority to ban him from leaving the country. Henry meanwhile fired him, but a source told the BBC that he had no authority to take such an action.

Renald Lubérice, the secretary general of the Council of Ministers, resigned on 15 September due to the allegations against Henry and accused him of trying to obstruct justice. Henry meanwhile fired the Minister of Justice Rockefeller Vincent, who had ordered increased security for Bedford Claude citing threats to him. Henry's office addressed the allegations against him on 16 September, stating that he had received calls from numerous people inquiring about his safety after Moïse's assassination, and it could not identify every caller. It also dismissed suspicions against Henry, stating that contact with a suspect cannot be used to implicate someone in a case. Asked about his calls with Badio later by Associated Press, Henry stated that he did not remember them.

On 10 January 2022, an investigative report published by The New York Times stated that Henry had links with Joseph-Félix Badio, an alleged mastermind of Moïse's assassination, and that the two stayed in close contact even after the assassination. Two Haitian officials told the newspaper that Badio entered Henry's residence twice without being impeded by the guards, despite being wanted. Another of the prime suspects, Rodolphe Jaar, while admitting to having financed and planned the assassination, stated that Badio had described Henry as someone he could count on as an ally and could control after overthrowing Moïse. Jaar claimed that Badio had sought Henry's help in escaping, to which he agreed.

On 8 February, a recording of judge Garry Orélien, who previously oversaw the investigation of the assassination, was obtained by CNN in which Orélien accused Henry of being among those who planned the assassination of Moïse. He also accused Henry of being "connected and friends with" the mastermind of the assassination. This claim was also backed by multiple Haitian law enforcement officials who had investigated the assassination as well, and who also told CNN that Henry was obstructing the investigation. Orélien denied having this conversation, later in an interview with Radio Television Caraïbes he denied accusing Henry, while claiming that the CNN report intended to murder his career and force him to go into exile or be killed. On 11 February, Henry dismissed the allegations of his involvement as "fake news" and called on Badio to hand himself over to the authorities. He also added that no Haitian or American official had questioned him regarding the case.

=== Political crisis and resignation ===
Henry traveled to Guyana on 25 February 2024, and days later to Kenya to sign an agreement on the deployment of 1,000 Kenyan policemen in Haiti. When he tried to return to Haiti, he was unable to land as gang attacks shuttered the Toussaint Louverture International Airport and freed more than 4,000 prison inmates. Henry remained outside the country, signing his resignation in April 2024 from Los Angeles. The Economy and Finance Minister Michel Patrick Boisvert assumed the role of acting prime minister on 25 February in his absence.

On 11 March, Henry agreed to resign as the country's leader once the Transitional Presidential Council was formed, following a meeting in Jamaica with leaders of Caribbean states and U.S. Secretary of State Antony Blinken. By 13 March, some political parties said they would not participate in the deal. The council was formalized on 12 April, with members being named on 16 April and sworn in on 25 April when Henry presented his resignation in a letter signed on 24 April in Los Angeles. Henry's outgoing cabinet meanwhile appointed Boisvert as the interim prime minister.

== Personal life ==
Ariel Henry is the son of Elie S. Henry, who was a pastor and an elder of the Seventh-day Adventist Church. Ariel's father died on 20 December 2015. He is married to Annie Claude Massiau and his siblings are named Monique Henry, Edlyne Henry Richard, Elie Henry and Elvire Henry. His brother Elie is also a pastor and is the president of the Inter-American Division of Seventh-day Adventists since 2018, after he was elected for that role in that year and re-elected in 2022.

== Notes ==
Political offices
Preceded by Réginald Delva	Minister of Interior and Territorial Communities; 2015	Succeeded by Ardouin Zéphirin
Preceded by Victor Benoît	Minister of Social Affairs and Labor; 2015–2016	Succeeded by Jean René Antoine Nicolas
Preceded by Claude Joseph; Acting	Prime Minister of Haiti; Acting; 2021–2024	Succeeded by Michel Patrick Boisvert; Acting
