= Emmelie Prophète =

Haitian journalist

Emmelie Prophète Milcé
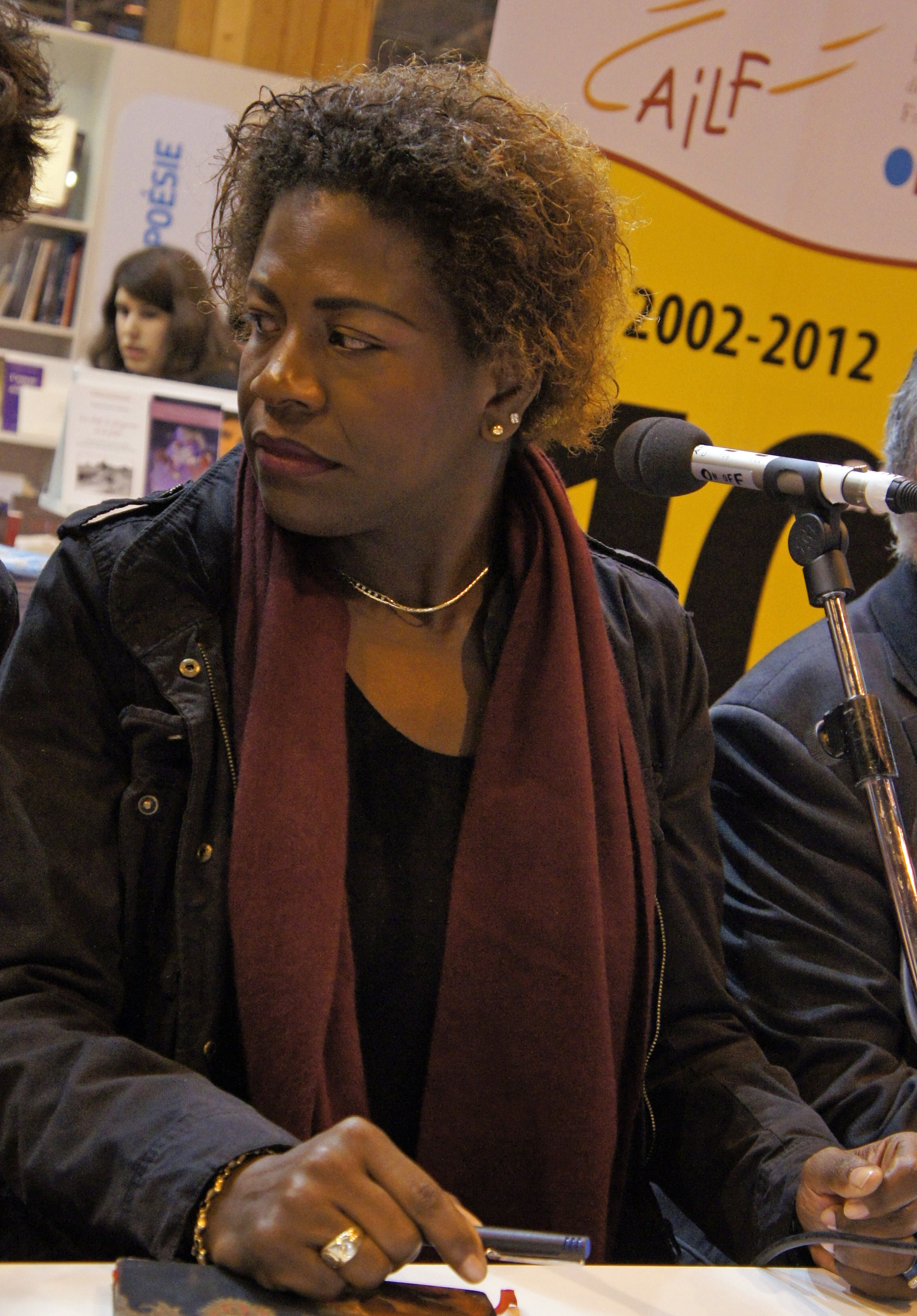
- Emmelie Prophète Milcé in 2012

Minister of Culture and Communication
- In office 11 January 2022 – 24 April 2024
- Prime Minister: Ariel Henry (acting)
- Preceded by: Ariel Henry (acting)

Minister of Justice and Public Security
- Acting
- In office 14 November 2022 – 24 April 2024
- Prime Minister: Ariel Henry (acting)
- Preceded by: Berto Dorcé
- Succeeded by: Carlos Hercules

Personal details
- Born: June 5, 1971 (age 54) Port-au-Prince, Haiti
- Education: Université de Port-au-Prince, Jackson State University
- Occupation: writer, government official

Emmelie Prophète (born June 5, 1971), also known as Emmelie Prophète Milcé, is a Haitian writer and diplomat. From November 2022 till April 2024, she served as the justice minister of Haiti.

== Early life and education ==
Prophète was born in Port-au-Prince and studied law and modern literature at the Université de Port-au-Prince and communications at Jackson State University. Prophète has also hosted a jazz program on Radio-Haïti. She has served as director of the Haiti Direction Nationale du Livre and the Bureau haïtien du droit d’auteur.

== Literary career ==
Prophète has published two books of poetry and six novels. She has contributed to various periodicals such as Chemins Critiques, Boutures, Cultura, La Nouvelle Revue Française and Le Nouvelliste.

Her novel Le Testament des solitudes won the Grand Prix littéraire de l’Association des écrivains de langue française in 2009. It became the first novel of hers to be published in English when, translated by Tina Kover and with the English title Blue, it was published by Amazon Publishing's translation imprint, AmazonCrossing, in January 2022.

Her 2020 novel, Les Villages de Dieu (Literal English translation: The Villages of God) won the 2022 Carbet de Lycéens. The English translation by Aidan Rooney and with the title Cécé was published in 2025.

== Government career ==
Prophète served as an attaché at the embassy in Haiti and in Geneva. In 2014, she was named head of the National Library of Haiti. In January 2022, the acting prime minister of Haiti, Ariel Henry, appointed her Minister of Culture and Communication. Henry then named Prophète as justice minister in November 2022, making her Haiti's fifth justice minister since the July 2021 assassination of Jovenel Moïse.

== Selected works ==
- Des marges à remplir, poetry (2000)
- Sur parure d’ombre, poetry (2004)
- Le Testament des solitudes, novel (2007), received the Prix littéraire des Caraïbes from the Association des écrivains de langue française
  - Published as Blue in English in 2022
- Le reste du temps, novel (2010)
- Impasse Dignité, novel (2012)
- Le désir est un visiteur silencieux, novel (2014)
- Le bout du monde est une fenêtre, novel (2015)
- Un ailleurs à soi, novel (2018)
- Les Villages de Dieu, novel (2020)
  - Published as Cécé in English in 2025
