= Ministry of Justice and Public Security (Haiti) =

Government minister of Haiti

- Coat of arms of Haiti

Agency overview
- Jurisdiction: Government of Haiti
- Minister responsible: Patrick Pelissier
- Website: https://mjsp.gouv.ht/

The Ministry of Justice and Public Security (French: ministère de la Justice et de la Sécurité publique, MJSP) is a ministry of the Government of Haiti. This ministry is responsible for law enforcement roles, along with playing an integral role in the Prime Minister's Cabinet.

== List of ministers ==
- 8 April 1811 - : Jean-Baptiste Juge, comte de Terre-Neuve
- 12 October 1816 - 10 March 1819: André Dominique Sabourin
- 6 May 1819 - 20 February 1827: Jacques Ignace Fresnel
- 20 February 1827 - 7 January 1844: Jean-Auguste Voltaire
- 7 January 1844 - 18 February 1845: Honoré Féry
- 18 February 1845 - 2 March 1846: Beaubrun Ardouin
- 2 March 1846 - 27 July 1847: Alphonse Larochel
- 27 July 1847 - 30 September 1847: Joseph François
- 30 September 1947 - 9 April 1848: Damien Delva
- 9 April 1848 - 14 February 1851: Jean-Baptiste Francisque, duc de Limbé
- 14 February 1851 - 15 January 1859: Lysius Salomon, duc de Saint-Louis-du-Sud
- 17 January 1859 - 24 March 1859: Jean-François Acloque
- 24 March 1859 - 10 August 1861: Elie Dubois
- 10 August 1861 - 6 January 1866: Valmé Lizaire
- 6 January 1866 - 20 February 1866: Jean-Baptiste Damier
- 20 February 1866 - 13 August 1866: Robert Deslandes
- 13 August 1866 - 7 March 1867: Dasny Labonté
- 7 March 1867 - 13 March 1867: Linstant de Pradines
- 21 March 1867 - 6 May 1867: Ultimo Lafontant
- 8 May 1867 - 21 July 1867: Linstant de Pradines (2nd time)
- 21 July 1867 - 10 February 1868: André Germain
- 10 February 1868 - 20 May 1868: Numa Rigaud
- 20 May 1868 - 3 August 1868: Alexandre Florent
- 3 August 1868 - 19 February 1869: Hilaire Jean-Pierre
- 19 February 1869 - 6 September 1869: Charles Archin
- 6 September 1869 - 23 March 1870: Dasny Labonté
- 23 March 1870 - 7 May 1870: Saint-Ilmond Blot
- 7 May 1870 - 27 April 1871: Benomy Lallemand
- 27 April 1871 - 29 June 1871: Thomas Madiou
- 29 June 1871 - 31 December 1871: Désilus Lamour
- 2 January 1872 - 15 June 1874: Octavius Rameau
- 15 June 1874 - 24 April 1876: James Boco
- 24 April 1876 - 17 July 1876: Thimogène Lafontant
- 20 July 1876 - 25 November 1876: Sauveur Faubert
- 25 November 1876 - 1 September 1878: Dalbémar Jean-Joseph
- 1 September 1878 - 1 September 1879: Charles Archin
- 1 September 1879 - 3 October 1879: Adelson Douyon
- 3 October 1879 - 3 November 1879: Numa Rigaud
- 3 November 1879 - 23 January 1880: Thimogène Lafontant
- 23 January 1880 - 26 August 1881: Charles Archin
- 26 August 1881 - 31 December 1881: François Denys Légitime
- 31 December 1881 - 20 August 1883: Thomas Madiou
- 20 August 1883 - 14 March 1884: Ovide Cameau
- 14 March 1884 - 16 February 1886: Innocent Michel Pierre
- 16 February 1886 - 9 July 1886: Lélio Dominique
- 9 July 1886 - 23 January 1888: Hugon Lechaud
- 23 January 1888 - 10 August 1888: Jean-Chrisostome Arteaud
- 1 September 1888 - : Etienne Erystale Claude
- 19 December 1888 - 25 April 1889: Eugène Margron
- 25 April 1889 - 31 May 1889: Solon Ménos
- 31 May 1889 - 20 June 1889: Alix Rossignol
- 20 June 1889 - 28 October 1889: Maximilien Laforest
- 28 October 1889 - 18 February 1890: Léger Cauvin
- 18 February 1890 - 12 August 1890: Hugon Lechaud
- 12 August 1890 - 1 July 1891: Duverneau Trouillot
- 1 July 1891 - 19 August 1891: Hugon Lechaud
- 19 August 1891 - 11 August 1892: Charles Archin
- 11 August 1892 - 19 May 1894: Edmond Lespinasse
- 19 May 1894 - 27 December 1894: Ultimo Saint-Amand
- 27 December 1894 - 17 December 1896: Pourcely Faine
- 17 December 1896 - 26 July 1897: Solon Ménos
- 26 July 1897 - 15 December 1897: Aurélus Dyer
- 15 December 1897 - 17 August 1899: Carméleau Antoine
- 17 August 1899 - 9 November 1900: Luxembourg Cauvin
- 9 November 1900 - 12 May 1902: Gédéus Gédéon
- 20 May 1902 - 21 December 1902: Lalannes
- 22 December 1902 - 4 April 1903: Ultimo Saint-Amand
- 4 April 1903 - 4 January 1905: J.J.F. Magny
- 4 January 1905 - 20 July 1905: Emile Deslandes
- 20 July 1905 - 6 December 1908: Thrasybule Laleau
- 8 December 1908 - 19 December 1908: Murat Claude
- 19 December 1908 - 14 July 1909: J.J.F. Magny
- 14 July 1909 - 20 July 1911: Jean-Chrisotome Arteaud
- 20 July 1911 - 4 August 1911: Furcy Châtelain
- 4 August 1911 - July 1913: Tertulien Guilbaud
- July 1913 - 1 October 1913: Etienne Mathon (a. i.)
- 1 October 1913 - 8 February 1914: Edouard Latortue
- 8 February 1914 - 10 May 1914: Jacques Nicolas Léger
- 10 May 1914 - 11 November 1914: Enoch Désert
- 11 November 1914 - 12 December 1914: Justin Joseph
- 12 December 1914 - 9 March 1915: Louis Borno
- 9 March 1915 - 14 May 1915 Tertulien Guilbaud
- 14 May 1915 - 14 August 1915: David Jeannot
- 14 August 1915 - 17 April 1917: Etienne Dornéval
- 17 April 1917 - 3 July 1917: Furcy Châtelain
- 3 July 1917 - 20 June 1918: Edmond Dupuy
- 20 June 1918 - 30 September 1918: Ernest Laporte
- 30 September 1918 - 17 October 1919: Constantin Benoit
- 17 October 1919 - 15 May 1922: Justin Barau
- 15 May 1922 - 27 September 1923: Arthur Rameau
- 27 September 1923 - 20 October 1924: Luc Dominique
- 20 October 1924 - 21 August 1925: Delabarre Pierre-Louis
- 21 August 1925 - 20 April 1926: Thimothée Paret
- 20 April 1926 - 15 November 1926: Emmanuel Cauvin
- 15 November 1926 - 31 March 1928: Emmanuel Beauvoir
- 31 March 1928 - 25 November 1929: Arthur Rameau
- 25 November 1929 - 4 March 1930: Charles Riboul
- 4 March 1930 - 6 May 1930: Thimothée Paret
- 6 May 1930 - 15 May 1930: Louis Edouard Rousseau
- 15 May 1930 - 19 August 1930: Ernest Douyon
- 19 August 1930 - 22 November 1930: Emmanuel Volel
- 22 November 1930 - 18 May 1931: Adhémar Auguste
- 18 May 1931 - 6 October 1931: Thrasybule Laleau
- 6 October 1931 - 17 May 1932: Emmanuel Rampy
- 17 May 1932 - 20 September 1933: Elie Lescot
- 20 September 1933 - 10 October 1936: Joseph Titus
- 10 October 1936 - 29 November 1937: Odilon Charles
- 29 November 1937 - 15 September 1938: Joseph Nemours Pierre-Louis
- 15 September 1938 - 5 January 1940: Luc Prophète
- 5 January 1940 - 10 October 1940: Léon Alfred
- 10 October 1940 - 7 April 1941: Amilcar Duval
- 8 April 1941 - 15 May 1941: Christian Latortue
- 15 May 1941 - 11 January 1946: Vély Thébaud
- 12 January 1946 - 16 August 1946: Eugène Kerby
- 19 August 1946 - 20 November 1948: Georges Honorat
- 26 November 1948 - 6 May 1950: Louis Raymond
- 6 May 1950 - 10 May 1950: Castel Démesmin
- 12 May 1950 - 19 August 1950: Emile Saint-Lot
- 19 August 1950 - 6 December 1950: Lélio Dalencourt
- 6 December 1950 - 5 May 1951: Montferrier Pierre
- 5 May 1951 - 29 February 1952: Félix Diambois
- 29 February 1952 - 1 April 1953: Paracelse Pélissier
- 1 April 1953 - 31 July 1954: Ducasse Jumelle
- 31 July 1954 - 6 September 1955: Luc Prophète
- 6 September 1955 - 29 August 1956: Adelphin Telson
- 29 August 1956 - 14 December 1956: Alphonse Racine
- 14 December 1956 - 2 February 1957: Rodolphe Bareau
- 9 February 1957 - 6 April 1957: Colbert Bonhomme
- 6 April 1957 - 25 May 1957: Stuart Cambronne
- 25 May 1957 - 10 June 1957: Seymour Lamothe
- 10 June 1957 - 14 June 1957: Antony Ervilus
- 14 June 1957 - 22 October 1957: André Fareau
- 22 October 1957 - 16 December 1957: Théodore Nicoleau
- 16 December 1957 - 17 June 1958: Emile Saint-Clair
- 17 June 1958 - 4 November 1958: Jean Bélizaire
- 4 November 1958 - 21 September 1959: Lucien Bélizaire
- 21 September 1959 - 19 December 1959: (Post vacant)
- 19 December 1959 - 30 May 1961: Luc François
- 30 May 1961 - 18 January 1963: Simon Desvarieux
- 18 January 1963 - 9 December 1963: Antoine Marthold
- 9 December 1963 - 22 May 1967: Rameau Estimé
- 22 May 1967 - 25 November 1968: Simon Desvarieux
- 25 November 1968 - : Rameau Estimé (2nd time)
- 22 April 1970 - 19 October 1970: Simon Desvarieux
- 19 October 1970 - 15 November 1972: Jean-André Rousseau
- 15 November 1972 - 20 March 1974: Fournier Fortuné
- 23 March 1974 - 27 May 1977: Aurélien Jeanty
- 27 May 1977 - 3 November 1978: Michel Fièvre
- 3 November 1978 - 23 April 1980: Ewald Alexis
- 23 April 1980 - 5 January 1981: Rock Raymond
- 5 January 1981 - 3 February 1982: Rodrigue Casimir
- 3 February 1982 - 12 July 1982: Dantès Colimon
- 12 July 1982 - 29 December 1982: Bertholand Edouard
- 29 December 1982 - 24 February 1984: Rodrigue Casimir
- 24 February 1984 - 3 October 1984: Jean Vandal
- 3 October 1984 - 10 June 1985: Pierre Gonzales
- 10 June 1985 - 30 December 1985: Théodore Achille
- 30 December 1985 - 7 February 1986: Jean Vandal
- 7 February 1986 - 20 March 1986: Gérard Gourgue
- 24 March 1986 - 5 January 1987: François Latortue
- 5 January 1987 - 7 February 1988: François Saint-Fleur
- 12 February 1988 - 20 June 1988: Martial Célestin
- 20 June 1988 - 18 September 1988: Fritz Antoine
- 18 September 1988 - 16 February 1989: Gilbert Austin
- 16 February 1989 - 16 March 1990: Augustin Romain Cème
- 16 March 1990 - 19 February 1991: Pierre Labissière
- 19 February 1991 - 17 May 1991: Bayard Vincent
- 17 May 1991 - 30 September 1991: Karl Auguste
- 15 October 1991 - 14 April 1992: Antoine Leconte
- 14 April 1992 - 19 June 1992: François Auguste
- 19 June 1992 - 1 September 1993: Moyse Sénatus
- 1 September 1993 - 14 October 1993: François Guy Malary
- 14 October 1993 - 16 May 1994: (Post vacant)
- 16 May 1994 - 8 November 1994: Luc Toussaint
- 8 November 1994 - 24 January 1995: Ernest Mallebranche
- 24 January 1995 - 7 November 1995: Jean-Joseph Exumé
- 7 November 1995 - 6 March 1996: René Magloire
- 6 March 1996 - 24 March 1999: Pierre-Max Antoine
- 24 March 1999 - 2 March 2001: Camille Leblanc
- 2 March 2001 - 18 March 2002: Gary Lissade
- 18 March 2002 - 30 September 2002: Jean-Baptiste Brown
- 30 September 2002 - 29 February 2004: Calixte Delatour
- 17 March 2004 - 14 June 2005: Bernard Gousse
- 23 June 2005 - 9 June 2006: Henri Marge Dorléans
- 9 June 2006 - 5 September 2008: René Magloire
- 5 September 2008 - 10 November 2008: Michèle Pierre-Louis (f) (a. i.)
- 10 November 2008 - 11 November 2009: Jean-Joseph Exumé
- 11 November 2009 - 27 June 2011: Paul Denis
- 27 June 2011 - 18 October 2011: Jean-Max Bellerive (a. i.)
- 19 October 2011 - 22 November 2011: Josué Pierre-Louis
- 22 November 2011 - 12 December 2011: Garry Conille (a. i.)
- 12 December 2011 - 8 May 2012: Michel Brunache
- 8 May 2012 - 18 January 2015: Jean Renel Sanon
- 18 January 2015 - 23 March 2016: Pierre-Richard Casimir
- 23 March 2016 - 13 March 2017: Camille Edouard, Jr
- 13 March 2017 - ?: Heidi Fortuné
- March 2020 - 9 July 2020: Lucmanne Delille
- 9 July 2020 - 15 September 2021: Rockefeller Vincent
- 15 September 2021 - ?: Liszt Quitel (a. i.)
- ? - November 2022: Berto Dorcé
- 14 November 2022 - 24 April 2024: Emmelie Prophète
- 12 June 2024 - March 2026: Carlos Hercules
- March 2026 - present: Patrick Pelissier

== See also ==
- Justice ministry
- Politics of Haiti
