= Ministry of Culture and Communication =

The Ministry of Culture and Communication may refer to:

- Ministry of Culture (France), formerly known as the Ministry of Culture and Communication
- Ministry of Culture and Communications (Quebec), Canada
- Ministry of Culture and Communications (Ontario), Canada
- Ministry of Culture and Communication (Haiti)
- Ministry of Information, Communication and Culture (Malaysia)
- Ministry of Culture and Communication (Morocco)

== See also ==
- Ministère de la Culture et de la Communication
