= Ministry of Culture =

Ministry of Culture may refer to:

- Ministry of Tourism, Cultural Affairs, Youth and Sports (Albania)
- Ministry of Culture (Algeria)
- Ministry of Culture (Argentina)
- Minister for the Arts (Australia)
- Ministry of Culture (Azerbaijan)
- Ministry of Cultures (Bolivia)
- Ministry of Culture (Brazil)
  - Ministry of Citizenship (Brazil), defunct ministry
- Ministry of Culture, Youth and Sports (Brunei)
- Ministry of Culture (Burma)
- Ministry of Home and Cultural Affairs (Bhutan)
- Ministry of Youth, Gender, Sport and Culture (Botswana)
- Ministry of Culture and Fine Arts (Cambodia)
- Minister of Canadian Heritage
  - Ministry of Tourism and Culture (Ontario) (result of merger of Ministry of Culture (Ontario))
- Ministry of Culture (Cape Verde)
- Ministry of Culture (Bulgaria)
- Ministry of Culture and Tourism (China)
  - Ministry of Culture (China) (former ministry, until 2018)
  - Home Affairs Bureau (Hong Kong)
  - Secretariat for Social Affairs and Culture (Macau)
- Ministry of Culture (Colombia)
- Ministry of Culture (Croatia)
- Ministry of Culture (Czech Republic)
- Ministry of Culture (Denmark)
- Ministry of Higher Education, Science and Culture (East Timor)
- Ministry of Culture (Egypt)
- Ministry of Culture (Estonia)
- Ministry of Culture and Tourism (Ethiopia)
- Ministry of Culture (France)
- Ministry of Culture (Greece)
- Ministry of Culture and Communication (Haiti)
- Ministry of Culture, Arts and Sports (Honduras)
- Minister of Education of Hungary
- Minister of Education, Science and Culture (Iceland)
- Ministry of Culture (Indonesia)
- Ministry of Culture (India)
- Ministry of Culture and Islamic Guidance (Iran)
- Minister for Culture, Communications and Sport (Ireland)
- Ministry of Culture and Sports (Israel)
- Ministry of Culture (Italy)
- Minister of Education, Culture, Sports, Science and Technology (Japan)
- Ministry of Culture (Jordan)
- Ministry of Culture (Kazakhstan)
- Ministry of Culture, Information, Sports and Youth Policy (Kyrgyzstan)
- Ministry of Culture (Lithuania)
- Ministry of Culture (Lebanon)
- Minister of Tourism, Arts and Culture (Malaysia)
- Secretariat of Culture (Mexico)
- Ministry of Culture (Moldova)
- Ministry of Culture (Montenegro)
- Ministry of Culture (Morocco)
- Ministry of Religious Affairs and Culture (Myanmar)
- Minister of Culture, Tourism and Civil Aviation (Nepal)
- Ministry of Education, Culture and Science (Netherlands)
- Ministry for Culture and Heritage (New Zealand)
- Federal Ministry of Information and Culture (Nigeria)
  - Ministry of Culture and Tourism (Rivers State)
- Minister of Culture (North Korea)
- Ministry of Culture (North Macedonia)
- Ministry of Culture (Norway)
- National Heritage and Culture Division (Pakistan)
- Ministry of Culture (Palestine)
- Ministry of Culture (Peru)
- Minister of Culture and National Heritage (Poland)
- Ministry of Culture (Portugal)
- Ministry of Culture, Arts and Heritage (Qatar)
- Ministry of Culture (Romania)
- Ministry of Culture (Russia)
- Ministry of Culture (Saudi Arabia)
- Ministry of Communications and Information (Singapore)
- Ministry of Culture (Ukraine)
- Ministry of Culture (Slovakia)
- Ministry of Culture (Slovenia)
- Minister of Arts and Culture (South Africa)
- Ministry of Culture, Sports and Tourism (South Korea)
- Ministry of Culture (Spain)
- Ministry of Culture (Sweden)
- Ministry of Culture (Syria)
- Ministry of Culture (Taiwan)
- Ministry of Culture (Thailand)
- Ministry of Culture and Tourism (Turkey)
- Ministry of Culture (Tunisia)
- Ministry of Culture (Turkmenistan)
- Ministry of Culture & Youth (United Arab Emirates)
- Department for Digital, Culture, Media and Sport (United Kingdom)
  - Secretary of State for Digital, Culture, Media and Sport (United Kingdom)
  - Parliamentary Under Secretary of State for Arts, Heritage and Tourism (United Kingdom)
    - Minister of Culture, Arts and Leisure (Northern Ireland)
    - Cabinet Secretary for the Constitution, External Affairs and Culture (Scotland)
    - Minister for Housing, Regeneration and Heritage (Wales)
- Ministry of Culture, Sports and Tourism (Vietnam)

== See also ==
- Ministère de la Culture (disambiguation), French-language ministries of culture
- Minister of Culture
