= Corruption in Haiti =

Corruption in Haiti occurs at one of the worst rates in the world. Corruption disrupts all attempts to establish a rule of law, a sustainable democracy, and to improve the quality of life of Haiti's people.

Haiti's score on Transparency International's 2025 Corruption Perceptions Index is 16 on a scale from 0 ("highly corrupt") to 100 ("very clean"). When ranked by score, Haiti ranked 169th among the 182 countries in the Index, where the country ranked first is perceived to have the most honest public sector. For comparison with regional scores, the best score among the countries of the Americas (Note: Argentina, Bahamas, Barbados, Belize, Bolivia, Brazil, Canada, Chile, Colombia, Costa Rica, Cuba, Dominica, Dominican Republic, Ecuador, El Salvador, Grenada, Guatemala, Guyana, Haiti, Honduras, Jamaica, Mexico, Nicaragua, Panama, Paraguay, Peru, Saint Lucia, Saint Vincent and the Grenadines, Suriname, Trinidad and Tobago, United States of America, Uruguay, Venezuela) was 75, the average score was 42 and the worst score was 10. For comparison with worldwide scores, the best score was 89 (ranked 1), the average score was 42, and the worst score was 9 (ranked 181, in a two-way tie).

Haiti has also had multiple incidents of military unrest.

== Contributing factors ==
Haiti, the Western Hemisphere's poorest country, is plagued by corruption, gang violence, drug trafficking, and organized crime. The effectiveness of public finance and the rule of law has been severely undermined by years of political volatility. Challenges include reconstruction following Hurricane Matthew, which struck in October 2016, and continued recovery from the devastating earthquake that struck early in 2010.

Close to 60% of the population lives below the national poverty line. Twenty-five percent of Haiti's people live in extreme poverty.

Corruption is a severe and widespread problem in all levels of government. Although there has been some progress since 2008, when Haiti was rated the world's fourth most corrupt country, there remains much room for improvement.

Robert Klitgaard, an expert on the subject, wrote in 2010 that corruption in Haiti "is not the activity of a few rogue officials or politicians" but is more like "organized crime", with corrupt procurement deals arising through collusion and kleptocratic racket.

In a January 2012 article, Peter Worthington stated that Haiti's dependency on foreign aid and corrupt legacy have hurt the nation's development more than the growing trend of educated Haitians emigrating.

== Impact on business ==
The Heritage Foundation describes Haiti as one of the most difficult environments for business with outdated regulatory boards in place. Haiti's score on the 2018 edition of the Index of Economic Freedom, published by The Heritage Foundation and The Wall Street Journal, was 55.8, making its economy the 124th-freest in the world. Haiti is ranked 25th among 32 countries in the Americas region in the Index, and its overall score is well below the regional and world averages. Poor economic management and crippling natural disasters have taken a terrible human and economic toll in Haiti. The effectiveness of public finance and the rule of law has been severely undermined by years of political volatility.

Mary Anastasia O'Grady of The Wall Street Journal argues that Haiti's policies discourage profitable business, despite the government's complaints about its inability to collect tax revenue. O'Grady noted that while most Caribbean nations take an average of 31 days to establish a business, in Haiti it takes an average of 97 days, and wrote that in Haiti a small elite hold control over most of the nation's markets, making economic mobility in the private sector nearly nil.

== Police ==
After Operation Uphold Democracy in 1994 (the U.S.-led intervention that toppled the brutal and corrupt Haitian military dictatorship that had ruled the country since a 1991 coup), the Haitian National Police was established. By 1997, it was reported that an estimated 6,000 police officers "were trained at a U.S.-funded academy to replace the army and tens of thousands of paramilitary police, auxiliaries, and informers" used in the period of military rule. However, through the 1990s and 2000s, the police force continued to suffer from serious corruption problems; police have engaged in excessive force, theft, drug trafficking, kidnapping rings and politically motivated killings.

Four former Haitian police officials were charged in 2005 in the U.S. with helping traffickers ship Colombian cocaine out of Port-au-Prince on a flight to the United States.

In 2005 (under the René Préval government), a reformer, Mario Andresol was appointed as director general of the National Police, declaring at the time that 25% of the police force was corrupt. Andresol purged the police force of a large number of corrupt officers, and the Préval government took other steps toward police reform; for example, a Haitian National Police Reform Plan was introduced in 2006, calling for an increase in the size of the police force and the vetting of current officers "to get rid of the corrupt and outright criminal". However, a 2011 report by Michel Forst, the United Nations special rapporteur on the situation of human rights defenders, said that police reform efforts were "being hampered by unacceptable political, operational and financial obstacles that are jeopardizing the changes for success in a process that is fundamental for re-establishing the rule of law in Haiti".

== History ==
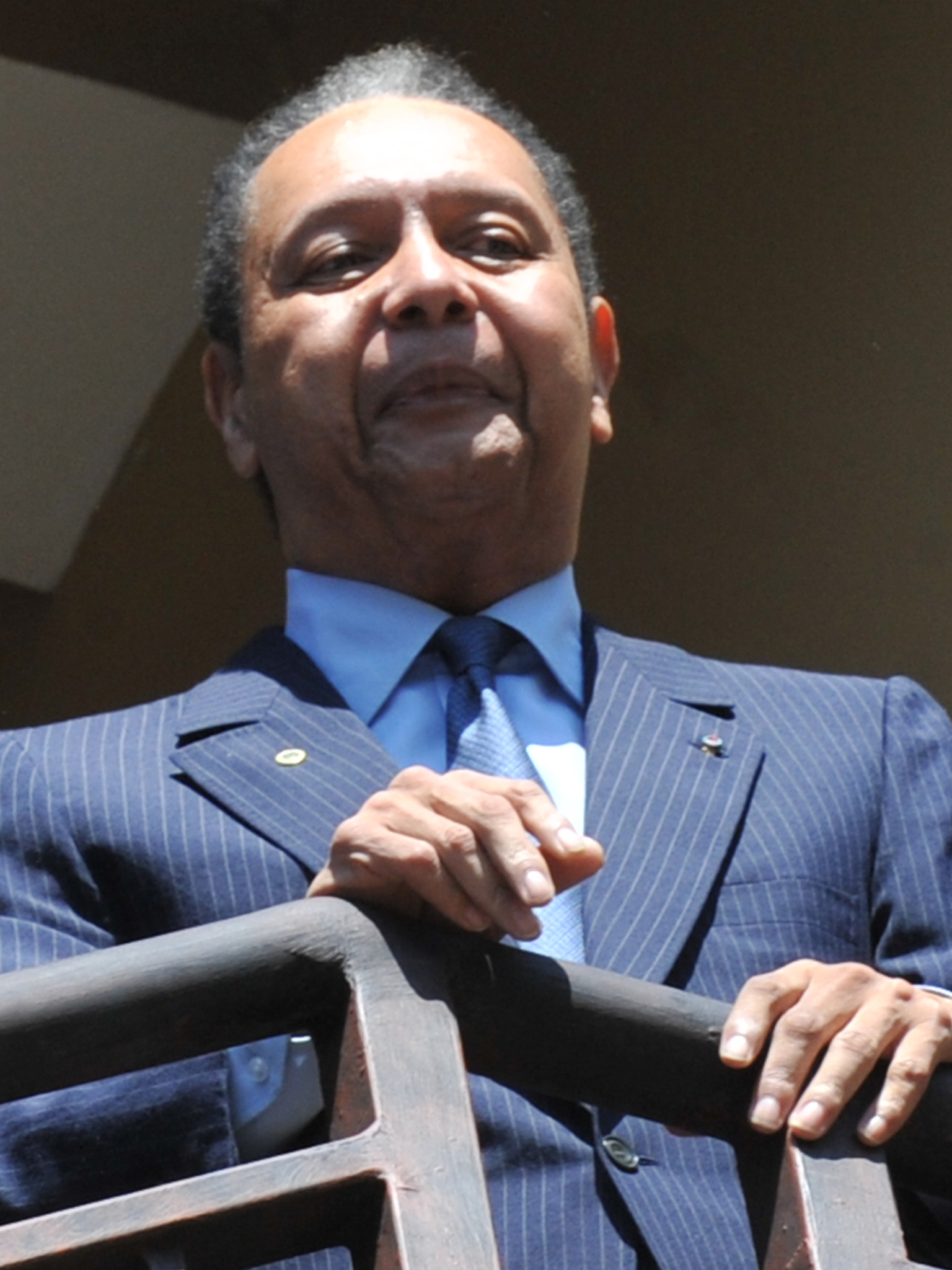
"Baby Doc" in 2011

Corruption has always been "endemic" in Haiti, but "became widespread that it bankrupted state finances" under the rule of Jean-Claude Duvalier ("Baby Doc"). Under Duvalier's regime (1971–1986), Haiti's transportation network was plundered, and regime elites frequently "raided the accounts of state monopolies" such as the Régie du Tabac (Tobacco Administration) while failing to pay taxes.

Economist Leslie Delatour described Haiti's economy as one in near-shambles Legal experts have cited a lack of judicial integrity in the country. Two experts in public administration, Derick Brinkerhoff and Carmen Halpern, said that government corruption is ingrained in Haitian politics.

=== Aristide presidency (1991, 1994–96, 2001–04) ===
Upon taking office the first time in 1991, President Jean-Bertrand Aristide said he would provide a new start and fight corruption. In September 1991, however, a military coup removed Aristide from power. Aristide regained power from 1994 to 1996 and then again from 2001 to 2004. During Aristide's three presidential administrations, according to a 2009 report, corruption thrived.

When Senator Dany Toussaint was indicted in May 2001 for complicity in a journalist's murder, he accused Judge Claudy Gassant of pressuring defendants to implicate him. Toussaint's followers protested, and Gassant resigned and left the country.

In 2004, an exiled Haitian drug lord, Beaudouin Ketant, said at his sentencing in the U.S. that Aristide controlled 85% of the cocaine flow through his country, and that Aristide had demanded bribes from other drug traffickers for years.

A 2005 report by the Financial Intelligence Unit Central (UCREF) stated that virtual companies called SEPA-N food supplies, Quisqueya store, and VJLS COCSOBFO were founded by Aristide and used to divert public funds. The report leveled embezzlement charges not only at Aristide but also at former Prime Minister Yvon Neptune and over a dozen former ministers.

Aristide's government, according to the UCREF, had funneled more than 21 million USD in public funds into private shell companies. A considerable portion of this embezzlement was used to support charities he owned in an alleged public relations stunt to improve his image.

In July 2008, evidence was uncovered by an investigative journalist alleging that Aristide had embezzled millions from Haiti's budget via a fraudulent 2003 contract with a New Jersey firm, IDT Corporation, and that Aristide's illicit profits had been stashed in a Turks and Caicos bank. An investigation led to a $1.3 million fine for James Courter, president of IDT. Despite calls for Aristide's prosecution, nothing was done by Haitian authorities.

=== Prime Minister Pierre-Louis (2008–09) ===
In a July 2009 interview, then-Prime Minister Michèle Pierre-Louis stated that corruption in Haiti is entrenched due to the system of cronyism in which insiders in the racket are promoted in the system. She claimed, therefore, there is little means of electing a legislature with integrity. However, she was soon harshly criticized for these comments, since she was herself accused of corruption on the grounds that much of the foreign aid received after a series of hurricanes in 2008 had purportedly gone missing on her watch. In October 2009, the Haitian Senate gave her a vote of no confidence and ousted her.

=== Préval presidency (1996–2001, 2006–11) ===
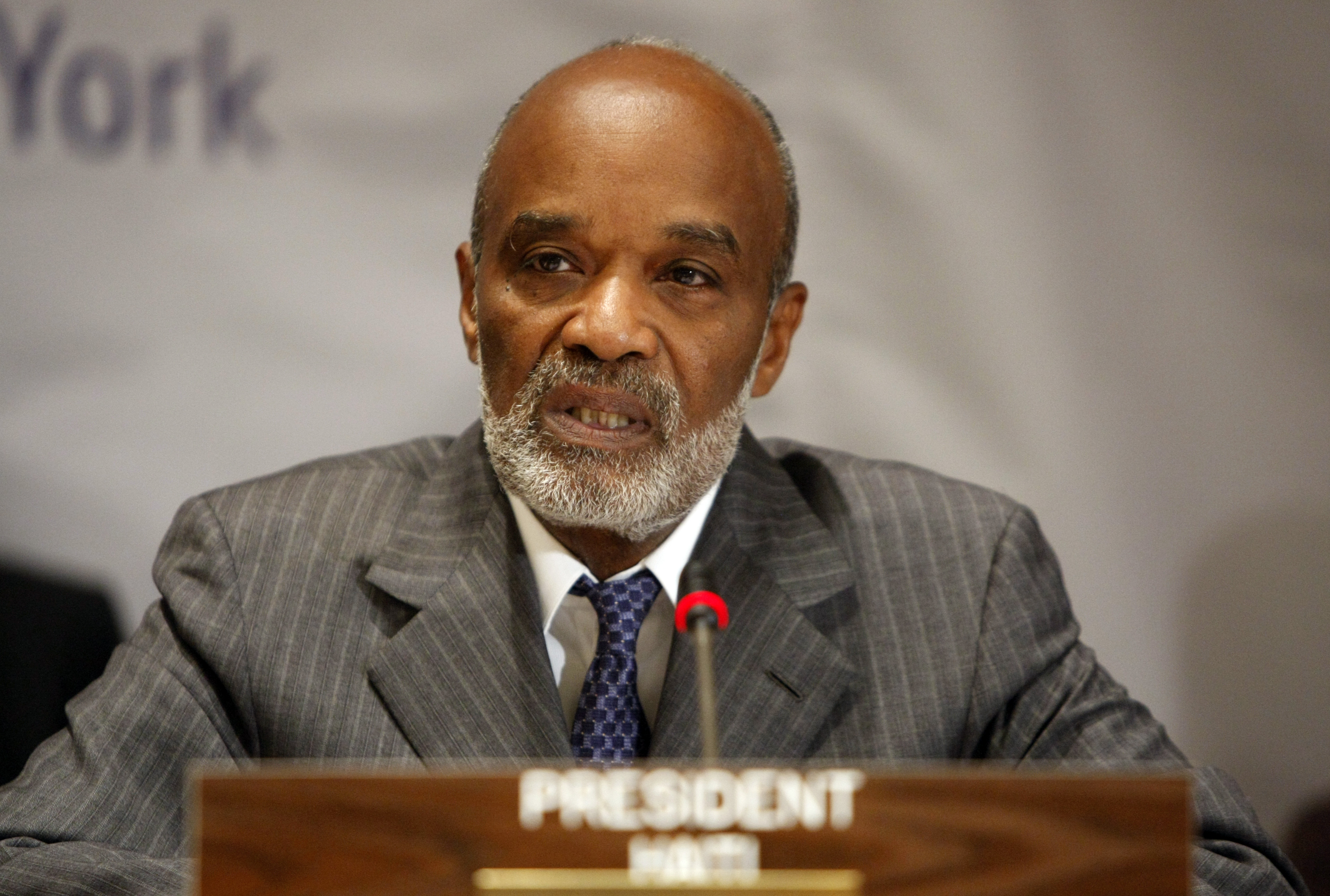
President Préval at the Conference towards a New Future for Haiti in 2010

When Rene Préval became president for a second time, in 2006, he inherited a political crisis, with a small elite controlling the nation's wealth. In 2006, Haiti was at the very bottom of Transparency International's Corruption Perception Index (CPI). Preval promised a fight on poverty and his Prime Minister, Jacques Édouard Alexis, said the government would implement "draconian" measures to combat corruption. To aid in this front, Préval named Judge Claudy Gassant as Government Commissioner in August 2006.

In May 2007, Préval deemed anyone implicated in corruption as enemies of the state. There was great hope that Gassant, who had an impressive reputation for integrity, would make a difference. Instead, his efforts proved a disappointment, and ultimately, he resigned in August 2008 and went to the Dominican Republic. Préval's presidency, in the end, was marked by an increase in violence and corruption. The Preval/Alexis government went on to undermine anti-corruption efforts by the interim Gérard Latortue presidency of 2005, withdrawing charges against Aristide and releasing several imprisoned Aristide associates who had been incarcerated for corruption.

In 2007, the Heritage Foundation publicly asked the Senate to explain why several members had voted for a resolution that benefited a bank called SOCABANK. Allegedly, the senators had received bribes, but nothing was done about the charges.

The year 2008 has been called Haiti's "annus horribilis for corruption." In 2008, Haiti was 177th of 180 countries on Transparency International's Corruption Perceptions Index.

In September 2008, a Senator disclosed that there was an investigation into the Prime Minister's office of alleged forgery. The investigation uncovered connections between applicants for government positions and payments made to the Prime Minister's office, as well as others in power. But the investigation did not lead to any action. Also in September 2008, it was revealed that the signatures of relevant authorities had been faked in an ONA request for $30,000 in project funding for what turned out to be a fictitious organization. No action was taken. In December 2008, Senator Joseph Lambert was linked to the murder of a Police Commissioner's wife in a case involving drug traffickers, but he was never charged.

In 2008, a Police Chaplains International revealed that members of the judiciary and police force were divvying up embezzled funds in Port-de-Paix.

=== Martelly presidency (2011–2016) ===
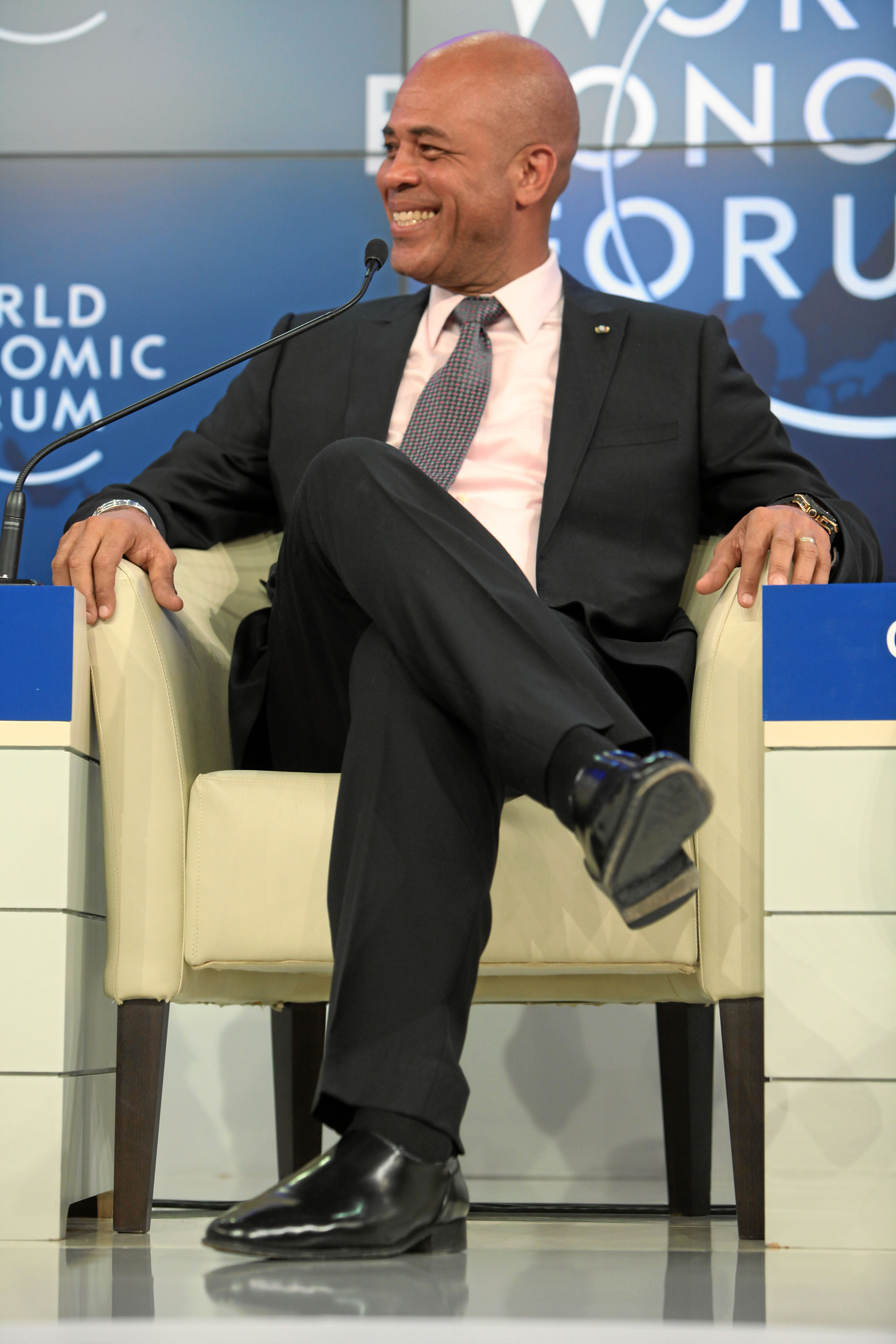
President Michel Martelly at the World Economic Forum in 2012

Upon taking office in 2011, President Michel Martelly dismissed Parliament and began governing by executive order. The New York Times described Martelly as being "surrounded by a network of friends and aides who have been arrested on charges including rape, murder, drug trafficking and kidnapping." The Times quoted a "longtime law enforcement official" who said he had ceased attending events at the presidential palace under Martelly "because he kept running into people who had been arrested on charges as serious as murder but were now working at the presidential offices as security guards."

Martelly's corruption has been criticized above all "for its effect on the judiciary, where the criminal cases of some people close to the president have stalled or disappeared," and where prosecutors who questioned presidential interference "were fired or fled." A judge who publicly criticized Martelly for involving himself in a civil corruption case against Sophia Martelly, the first lady, died two days after making his complaint. Robert Maguire, a Haitian scholar at George Washington University, described Martelly as having "established an environment of corruption, abuse of power and impunity." According to Nicole Phillips, a lawyer for the Institute for Justice and Democracy in Haiti, Martelly's administration had "improved infrastructure and built hotels, but also cracked down on rights activists and manipulated the judiciary to benefit the president's associates."

After his election, Martelly declared a tax on international phone calls, with the proceeds to be used for funding a $42.5 million education program. A huge sum was raised, but $26 million of it went missing, and only Martelly and "his inner circle" seemed to know where the funds went.

The World Bank and the Inter-American Development Bank criticized a 2012 decree by Martelly permitting the government to purchase some goods and services through closed bidding or no-bid contracts, saying this ruling could diminish accountability and transparency.

In January 2012, Senator Moïse Jean-Charles charged Martelly with spending government funds on friends and family, who were provided with "expensive foreign junkets, aircraft rentals, vehicle acquisitions," as well as with cash outlays. Previous Haitian presidents had received $5,000 a day for expenses when traveling abroad, but Martelly "quadrupled that per diem to $20,000 a day." The First Lady gets $10,000 a day, other Martelly family members receive $7,500 a day apiece, and other members of the presidential entourage draw $4,000 a day. Sophia Martelly provided "unsolicited Christmas decorations" to several ministry offices, which then received invoices from firms connected to her. Her father, Charles "Bébé" St. Rémy, withdrew $30 million in government funds from the Central Bank "to buy fertilizer for peasants," but no fertilizer materialized. Similarly, Martelly's son Sandro received $1.5 million in government funds for a soccer game.

In June 2013, several persons linked to Martelly were arrested on corruption charges. A friend, Jojo Lorquet, was charged with selling forged government badges; media figure Ernest Laventure Edouard was charged with impersonating a customs official and selling fake badges to Martelly associates. Edouard admitted to having distributed the fake badges, but claimed he had been given official permission to do so.

In October 2013, Andre Michel, an opposition lawyer who had launched legal proceedings against Martelly's wife and son, was arrested. At a protest against the arrest, Haitians used tear gas. A colleague of Michel's criticized the move as a kidnapping, citing laws against arbitrary detentions. Members of the Human Rights Defense Network made similar critiques and noted the lack of the rule of law.

In February 2014, Martelly said he had asked the U.S. to funnel more aid money through the Haitian government rather than NGOs. He said the reason for using NGOs as conduits had been government corruption in Haiti, but added that things were improving.

In December 2014, a Haitian Court ordered an investigation of Martelly's son, Olivier, and wife, Sophia. They were accused of several financial crimes, corruption, and abuse of power. Marylyn Allien, head of Transparency International's Haiti branch, noted that the President's family should under no circumstances be managing the budget. Sources told Voice of America that the President also bought five bulletproof vehicles with $2.5 million of the public budget, and that 60 Toyota SUVs had been given to Martelly's children, his wife, and others residing with him. Allien stated that the prosecutor's office held up attempts to prosecute corruption, noting that cases can take years to be processed.

A July 2015 report noted that Olivier Martelly had "no real job" but had "plenty of money," owned several cars, and possessed prime real estate in Haiti. It is alleged that any developers seeking contracts must pay bribes to Olivier. Most newspapers and other media in the country are afraid to publish anything related to Olivier's corruption due to violent reprisals and silencing.

In October 2015, The Nation described Martelly's government as "combination of increasing violence and mega-corruption."

Moïse presidency (2017–2021)

Section needs to be edited.

=== FIFA scandal ===
In June 2015, former FIFA vice-president and CONCACAF president Jack Warner was accused of diverting $750,000 (£490,000) in 2010 Haiti earthquake relief funds into his own bank accounts.

== 2010 earthquake ==
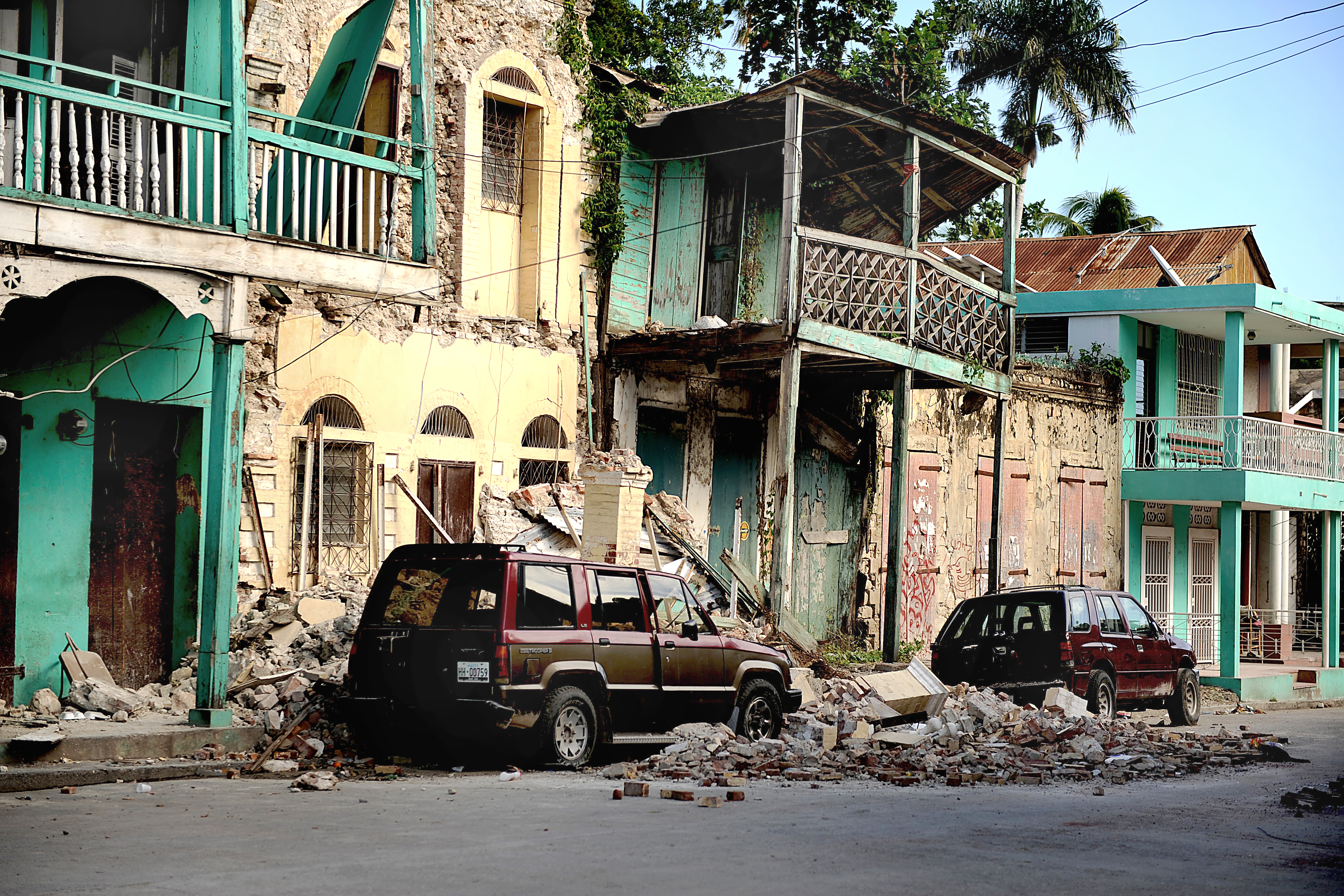
Damaged buildings after the 2010 earthquake

A massive, highly destructive earthquake struck Haiti on January 12, 2010.

Elizabeth Abbott wrote that the "near paralysis of the René Préval government" in responding to the earthquake can be traced to deeply rooted Duvalierism in Haiti. Abbott also notes that "the corruption that permeated the Haitian state" under Jean-Claude Duvalier "extended to the construction industry, which ignored building codes and bribed inspectors who overlooked flawed structures that would later crumble in the earthquake."

In February 2010, a local told the BBC that the only order came from American and other foreign aid. The destroyed infrastructure, as well as significant foreign aid, created the perfect environment for corruption, according to the BBC. Prime Minister Jean-Max Bellerive acknowledged the lack of oversight, claiming that no one in the government knew where aid money was going, lamenting that the government would be held accountable when, in truth, it had no control over those funds. When a reporter asked locals about corruption, the locals jokingly stated that the best way to help is to bar aid money from falling into Haitian hands. Many Haitians stated that the best aid would be helping to eradicate the corruption that has hampered the nation for years.

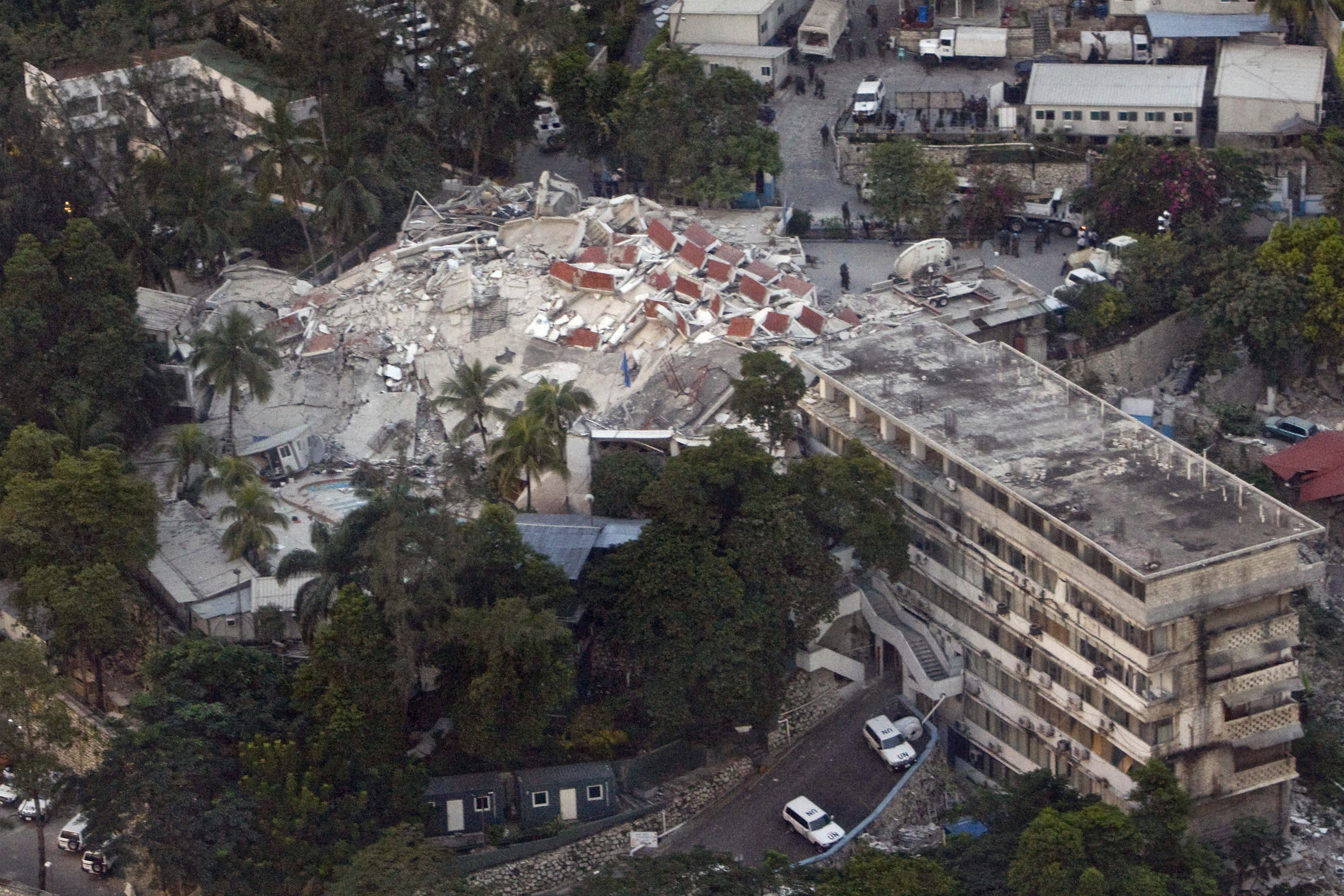
Collapsed United Nations building in Haiti

A week after the earthquake, Fox News reported that corruption was still the cause of Haiti's worst problems. The article noted that over the course of a year, the U.S. State Department reported that no corruption charges were filed at all in Haiti, despite overwhelming evidence against several officials. For this reason, the article charged, it was foolish to funnel post-earthquake assistance "through corrupt Haitian institutions."

Robert Klitgaard, in March 2010, noted that just a few months after the earthquake cynicism is pervasive in the country. Roslyn Hees, coauthor of Preventing Corruption in Humanitarian Operations, called Haiti a high-risk environment for corruption.

After the earthquake, former prime minister Michele Pierre-Louis said that Haiti lacked all order. Before the quake, crime and violence rates were improving, as was economic growth. Afterwards, Scott Wilson of The Washington Post wrote that with its government "riddled with corruption," many Haitians were now split in their desires, both wanting their government to use foreign aid money to help, but also hoping they would be cut off to minimize their embezzling.

Before resigning, Prime Minister Gary Conille made public the findings of an audit which showed irregularities in post-earthquake emergency rebuilding contracts awarded by his predecessor, Jean Max Bellerive, between 2010 and 2011 to forty-one Dominican companies. The audit uncovered a link between Bellerive and Felix Bautista, a Dominican senator who controlled the companies. Media reports in April 2012 alleged that Martelly had received campaign donations of $2.5 million, real-estate deals, and cash outlays from Bautista in exchange for the contracts, a charge Martelly denied. In July, the Martelly government cancelled all but two of the forty-one contracts.

=== American Red Cross aid ===
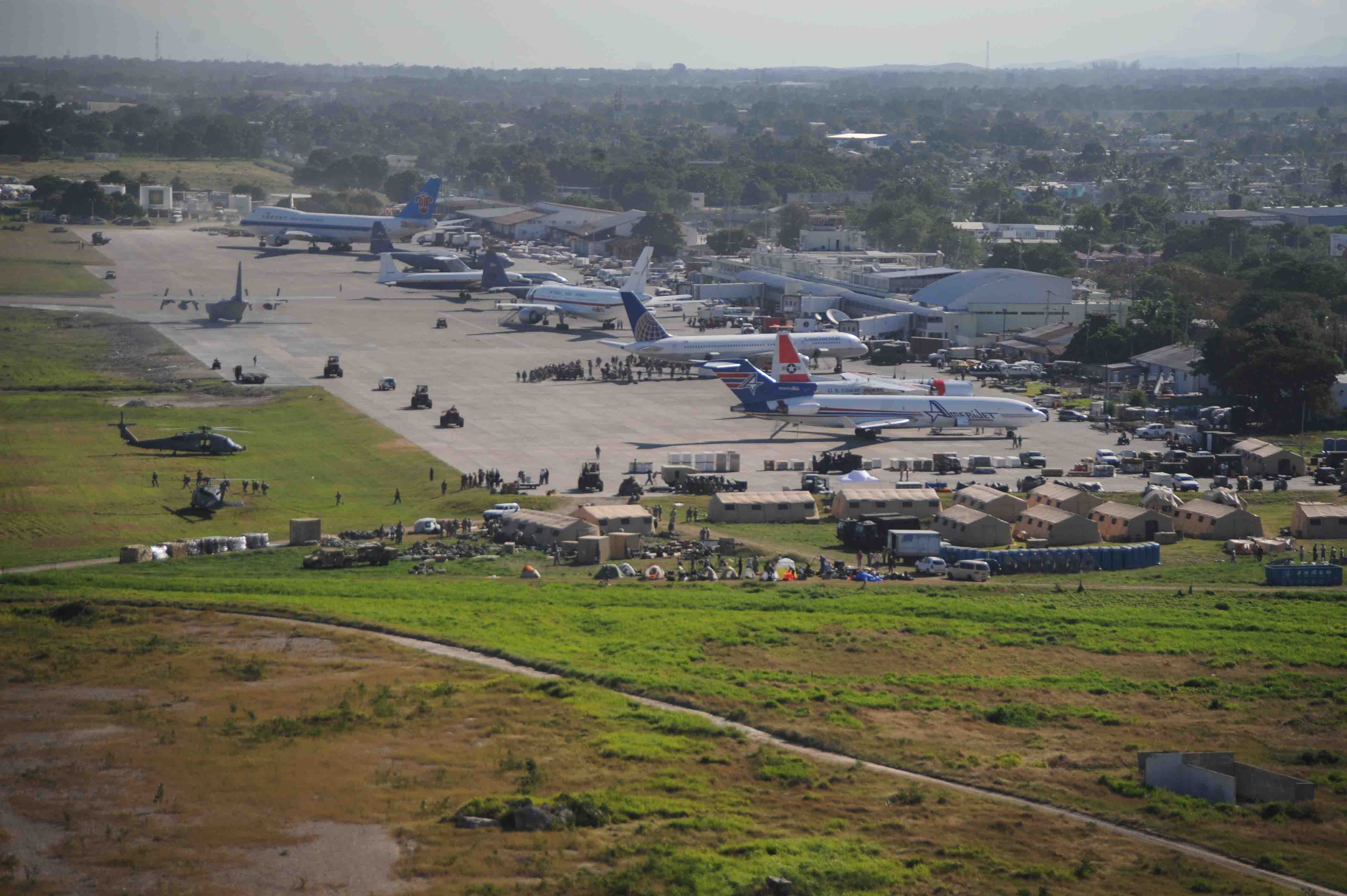
Planes unloading supplies for the earthquake relief effort

The American Red Cross collected nearly $500 million in donations post-earthquake Haitian relief but did only a very small fraction of what it said it would do with those funds. A June 2015 investigation by ProPublica and NPR concluded that the Red Cross had "launched a multimillion-dollar project" in 2011 to "transform the desperately poor" Port-au-Prince neighborhood of Campeche, yet "not one home" had been constructed in Campeche.

ProPublica and NPR reported that while the Red Cross claimed to have "provided homes to more than 130,000 people," that figure "includes thousands of people who were not actually given homes, but rather were 'trained in proper construction techniques.'" The actual number of permanent homes built by the Red Cross in Haiti was six. The report quoted a former Red Cross official as saying that inside the organization, the Haiti earthquake was seen as "a spectacular fundraising opportunity" and that the money collected for Haiti was instead used to "erase its more-than $100 million deficit."

=== Clinton Foundation and Clinton Bush Haiti Fund funds ===
After the earthquake, the Clinton Foundation spent more than $30 million in Haiti and through the Clinton Global Initiative led efforts leading to further contributions from private companies. Separately, the Clinton Bush Haiti Fund (created by a partnership between former U.S. presidents Bill Clinton and George H. W. Bush) distributed $54.4 million in the two years following the Haitian earthquake. Various projects supported by these contributions met with mixed successes. In 2015, The Washington Post reported that there was "a growing backlash that too little has been accomplished in the past five years and that some of the most high-profile projects" backed by the Clinton Foundation "have helped foreign investors and Haiti's wealthy elites more than its poor " and attributed failures in part to "the country's chaotic political situation .... marked by endemic corruption, weak institutions, poverty, poor public education, terrible roads and other factors that have historically made it extremely difficult for development efforts to succeed." The Clinton Bush Haiti Fund ceased operations in December 2012 after raising $54 million, which was by then distributed to more than 50 businesses and organizations to spur sustainable development and bridge the gap between short-term reconstruction needs and longer-term development. In 2016, however, The Washington Post stated that "the Clintons played a major role in recovery efforts in Haiti after the devastating earthquake in 2010" and described the Clinton family as "a mixture of success, disappointment and controversy." It was also noted that one successful Clinton Foundation project included providing solar panels at the Hospital Bernard Mevs in Port-au-Prince. As of July 2021, the Clinton Foundation, which is still operational, has noted on its website that only $30 million has been raised through the foundation itself since 2010 for Haiti recovery projects, with $16.4 being donated from individual donors for immediate relief efforts, while much larger donations totaling more than $300 million have been raised through the Haiti Action Network.

Further controversy arose after it was reported that the Haitian government had granted a rare Haitian mining permit to a company for which Tony Rodham (Hillary Clinton's younger brother) served on the advisory board. Spokespeople for Bill and Hillary Clinton said that they were unaware of the fact, and the permits have been placed on hold by the Senate of Haiti.

== Anti-corruption efforts ==
Bribes, money laundering, and other kinds of corruption by individuals and financial institutions are illegal in Haiti and punishable by fines, imprisonment, and seizure of assets. Often, however, the laws against corruption have not been vigorously enforced. The constitution requires the Senate to prosecute Parliament members and other highly placed government officials accused of corruption, but this does not happen in practice.

In 2004, the government formed a special task force to combat corruption named the ULCC. The ULCC drafted a law requiring civil servants and public figures to disclose assets, and in 2008, it was passed by Parliament. By September 2012, the ULCC had conducted over 1,000 seizures in which it recovered over 17.9 million HTG ($447,500) and had referred sixteen cases to the prosecutor's office. Among those found guilty was Edrick Leandre, former head of the department of Vehicle Insurance, who was sentenced in 2011 for corruption and embezzlement.

In 2005, the government formed the National Commission for Public Procurement (CNMP), whose task is to ensure competitive bidding for public contracts and to promulgate effective procurement controls in government administration. Despite the CNMP's efforts, major public procurement contracts, notably those involving the state electric company EDH, are routinely awarded in a non-competitive fashion. This provides significant opportunities for graft.

In February 2006, the Heritage Foundation's Haiti branch launched an appeal for the legislature to ratify the United Nations Convention Against Corruption.

In 2007, the government instituted a campaign to curb corruption in both the public and private sectors. As part of this effort, major business figures were arrested. Among them were SocaBank board members, who were accused of embezzlement. Other businessmen were arrested on suspicion of fraud through customs, but the charges were later dropped. Several customs officials were arrested in the same case.

The Center for Pleas and Legal Assistance (CEPAJ) was founded in May 2008 to provide protection to witnesses and victims of corruption.

The Financial Intelligence Unit, a part of the Ministry of Justice, has investigated the misuse of social-security funds.

In 2009, Haiti was praised for its arrest of Jean Rene Duperval, a former government figure known for soliciting bribes. From 2001 to 2005, a U.S. telecommunications firm funneled $800,000 in bribes, laundered to Duperval and other Téléco officials, in exchange for which they were provided with special telecom rates, reduced payments, and other advantages, all of which deprived Haiti of revenue.

In 2011, former president Jean-Claude Duvalier was arrested upon entry to Haiti on charges of corruption, torture, and murder. In early 2012, investigating magistrate Carves Jean dropped all but the corruption charges.

Beginning in November 2014, the ABA Rule of Law Initiative and the ULCC held a series of workshops in Port-au-Prince for members of the judiciary, focusing on investigation techniques, new legislation, and new anti-corruption procedures. Reportedly, judiciaries attending the workshops were largely unable to identify examples of corruption, and lacked an understanding of the judiciary's role in combatting corruption.

The Organization of People in Struggle (OPL), a political party, called in October 2015 for a corruption investigation into all electoral councilors.

== See also ==
- Crime in Haiti
