= Ministère de la Culture =

Ministère de la Culture is French for Ministry of Culture.

It may refer to: (as a native name)

- Ministry of Culture (France); French: Ministère de la Culture
- Ministry of Culture (Ontario), Canada; French: Ministère de la Culture
- Ministry of Culture and Communications (Quebec), Canada; French: Ministère de la Culture et des Communications
- Ministry of Culture, Tourism and Handicrafts (Guinea); French: Ministère de la Culture, du Tourisme et de l'Artisanat
- Ministry of Culture (Lebanon); French: Ministère de la Culture

== See also ==
- Minister of Culture
- Ministère de la Culture et de la Communication
