= List of labor ministers of Haiti =

The following is a list of ministers of labor of Haiti.

== List ==
- 27 June 1924 – 22 October 1924: Louis Prophète
- 22 October 1924 – 21 August 1925: Hermann Héreaux
- 21 August 1925 – 15 November 1926: Hénec Dorsinville
- 15 November 1926 – 31 May 1928: Auguste Scott
- 31 May 1928 – 25 November 1929: Charles Bouchereau
- 25 November 1929 – 27 January 1930: Hannibal Price
- 27 January 1930 – 22 April 1930: Elie Lescot
- 22 April 1930 – 15 May 1930: Louis Edouard Rousseau
- 15 May 1930 – 19 August 1930: Damoclès Vieux
- 19 August 1930 – 22 November 1930: Darthon Latortue
- 22 November 1930 – 18 May 1931: Antoine V. Carré
- 18 May 1931 – 17 May 1932: Alexandre Etienne
- 17 May 1932 – 20 September 1933: Paul Salomon
- 20 September 1933 – 24 December 1937: Juvigny Vaugues
- 24 December 1934 – 17 August 1925: Léon Liautaud
- 17 August 1925 – 10 October 1936: Edmé Manigat
- 10 October 1936 – 29 November 1937: Auguste Turnier
- 29 November 1937 – 5 January 1940: DuMarchais Estimé
- 5 January 1940 – 10 October 1940: Luc Fouché
- 10 October 1940 – 18 January 1941: Joseph D. Charles
- 18 January 1841 – 15 May 1941: Edward Volel
- 15 May 1941 – 11 January 1946: Maurice Dartigue
- 12 January 1946 – 16 August 1946: Eugène Kerby
- 19 August 1946 – 26 October 1946: Maurice Latortue
- 6 October 1946 – 10 April 1947: Philippe Charlier
- 10 April 1947 – 8 December 1947: Emile Saint-Lot
- 8 December 1947 – 26 November 1948: Jean P. David
- 26 November 1948 – 14 October 1949: Louis Bazin
- 14 October 1949 – 10 May 1950: François Duvalier
- 10 May 1950 – 12 May 1950: Alix Pasquet (a. i.)
- 12 May 1950 – 19 August 1950: Emile Saint-Lot (2nd time)
- 19 August 1950 – 6 December 1950: Lélio Dalencourt
- 6 December 1950 – 5 May 1951: Montferrier Pierre
- 5 May 1951 – 1 April 1953: Clément Jumelle
- 1 April 1953 – 6 September 1955: Roger Dorsinville
- 6 September 1955 – 29 August 1956: Jacques A. François
- 29 August 1956 – 14 December 1956: Séjour Laurent
- 14 December 1956 – 9 February 1957: Joseph Buteau
- 9 February 1957 – 2 April 1957: Marc Augustin
- 6 April 1957 – 25 May 1957: Seymour Lamothe
- 25 May 1957 – 14 June 1957: Anthony Hervilus
- 14 June 1957 – 22 October 1957: André Fareau
- 22 October 1957 – 6 December 1957: Antoine Pierre-Paul
- 6 December 1957 – 19 February 1958: Théodore Nicoleau
- 19 February 1958 – 17 June 1958: Colbert Bonhomme
- 17 jun 1958 – 4 November 1958: Jean A. Magloire
- 4 November 1958 – 21 September 1959: Lucien Bélizaire
- 19 December 1959 – 30 May 1961: Frédéric Desvarieux
- 30 May 1961 – 6 October 1962: Gasner Kersaint
- 6 October 1962 – 31 March 1976: Max A. Antoine
- 31 March 1976 – 3 November 1978: Achille Salvant
- 3 November 1978 – 23 April 1980: Hubert De Ronceray
- 23 April 1980 – 30 April 1982: Ulysse Pierre-Louis
- 12 July 1982 – 5 October 1984: Théodore Achille
- 5 October 1984 – 12 September 1985: Arnold Blain
- 12 September 1985 – 5 November 1985: Hervé Denis
- 5 November 1985 – 30 December 1985: Jean-Robert Estimé
- 30 December 1985 – 7 February 1986: Daniel Supplice
- 7 February 1982 – 24 March 1986: Thony Auguste
- 24 March 1986 – 7 February 1988: Gérard Noël
- 12 February 1988 – 20 June 1988: Harry Carrénard
- 20 June 1988 – 18 September 1988: Phèdre Désir
- 18 September 1988 – 16 February 1990: Arnault Guerrier
- 16 February 1990 – 16 March 1990: Camille D. Sylaire
- 16 March 1990 – 24 August 1990: Claudette Werleigh
- 24 August 1990 – 7 February 1990: Carlo Désinor
- 19 February 1990 – 14 June 1991: Ernst Verdieu
- 14 June 1991 – 30 September 1991: Myrtho Célestin
- 15 October 1991 – 1992: Joachim Pierre
- 19 June 1992 – 1 September 1993: André Brutus
- 1 September 1993 – 16 May 1994: Bertony Berry
- 16 May 1994 – 8 November 1994: Maud Timothée
- 8 November 1994 – 10 August 1995: Enold Joseph
- 10 August 1995 – 6 March 1996: Mathilde Flambert
- 6 March 1996 – 24 March 1999: Pierre D. Amédée
- 24 March 1999 – 2 March 2001: Mathilde Flambert (2nd time)
- 2 March 2001 – 29 February 2004: Eudes Saint-Preux Craan
- 17 March 2004 – 23 June 2005: Pierre Claude Calixte
- 23 June 2005 – 9 June 2006: Franck Charles
- 9 June 2006 – 5 November 2008: Gérald GerMayn
- 5 November 2008 – 11 November 2009: Gabrielle P. Beaudin
- 11 November 2009 – 2 September 2010: Yves Christallin
- 6 September 2010 – 18 October 2011: Gérald GerMayn
- 18 October 2011 – 14 May 2012: François R. Lafaille
- 14 May 2012 - 6 August 2012: Ronsard Saint-Cyr
- 6 August 2012 - 21 January 2013: Josefa Gauthier
- 21 January 2013 - 18 January 2015: Charles Jean-Jacques
- 18 January 2015 - 7 September 2015: Victor Benoit
- 7 September 2015 - 23 March 2016: Ariel Henry
- 23 March 2016 - 13 March 2017: Jean René Antoine Nicolas
- 13 March 2017 - 29 August 2017: Roosevelt Bellevue
- 29 August 2017 - 13 September 2017: Jack Guy Lafontant (a.i.)
- 13 September 2017 - 17 September 2018 : Stéphanie Auguste
- 12 June 2024 - present: Georges Wilbert Franck
