= Ministry of Social Affairs and Labor (Haiti) =

Government minister of Haiti

- Coat of arms of Haiti

Agency overview
- Jurisdiction: Government of Haiti
- Minister responsible: Marc-Élie Nelson
- Website: http://mast.gouv.ht/

The Ministry of Social Affairs and Labor (French: Ministère des Affaires sociales et du Travail, MAST) is a ministry of the Government of Haiti. This ministry is responsible for workplace standards on behalf of employees and is part of the Prime Minister's Cabinet.

== See also ==
- List of labor ministers of Haiti
