= Alexandre Florent =

French politician

Alexandre Florent (4 February 1849, Lyon - 1 December 1922) was a French Blanquist socialist politician. He was a member of the Chamber of Deputies from 1898 to 1902.
