= Ministère de la Culture et de la Communication =

Ministère de la Culture et de la Communication is French for Ministry of Culture and Communication

It may refer to: (as a native name)

- Ministry of Culture (France), formerly known as the Ministère de la Culture et de la Communication
- Ministry of Culture and Communications (Quebec), Canada; (French: Ministère de la Culture et des Communications)
- Ministry of Culture (Ontario), Canada; formerly Ministry of Culture and Communications (French: Ministère de la Culture et des Communications)

== See also ==
- Ministère de la Culture
