= University of Port-au-Prince =

Private university in Port-au-Prince, Haiti

- Université de Port-au-Prince
- Type: Private
- Established: 3 November 1983; 42 years ago
- Location: Port-au-Prince, Haiti; 18.537°N 72.322°W
- Website: www.uportauprince.ht

The University of Port-au-Prince (French: Université de Port-au-Prince, UP) is a for-profit private higher education institution located in Port-au-Prince, Haiti founded on 3 November 1983.

The University is is organized into six faculties: the Faculty of Computer Science,Faculty of Economics, Faculty of Arts and Humanities, Faculty of Administrative Sciences, Faculty of Law,Faculty of Political Science and Public Administration.

Its enrollment is ranged from 1,000 to 1,999 students. UP offers courses and programs leading to officially recognized higher education degrees in several areas of study.

== Athletics ==
UP won the 2008–09 University Basketball Championship of Haiti.
