= Rameau Estimé =

Haitian politician

Rameau Estimé was a Haitian pro-Duvalier politician, and former member of the cabinet and president of the Chamber of Deputies.

Estimé was president of the Chamber of Deputies on multiple occasions, including from 1962 to 1963. He was appointed minister of justice from 1963 to 1967. François Duvalier imprisoned him in Fort Dimanche in 1967, and offered him to take up him former position as minister justice in 1968 when he was released from prison.

Estimé was later again imprisoned in 1970 while he was still a minister and he died in prison cell in May 1976 on diarrhea and malnutrition.
