= Jean-Max Bellerive =

Prime Minister of Haiti from 2009 to 2011

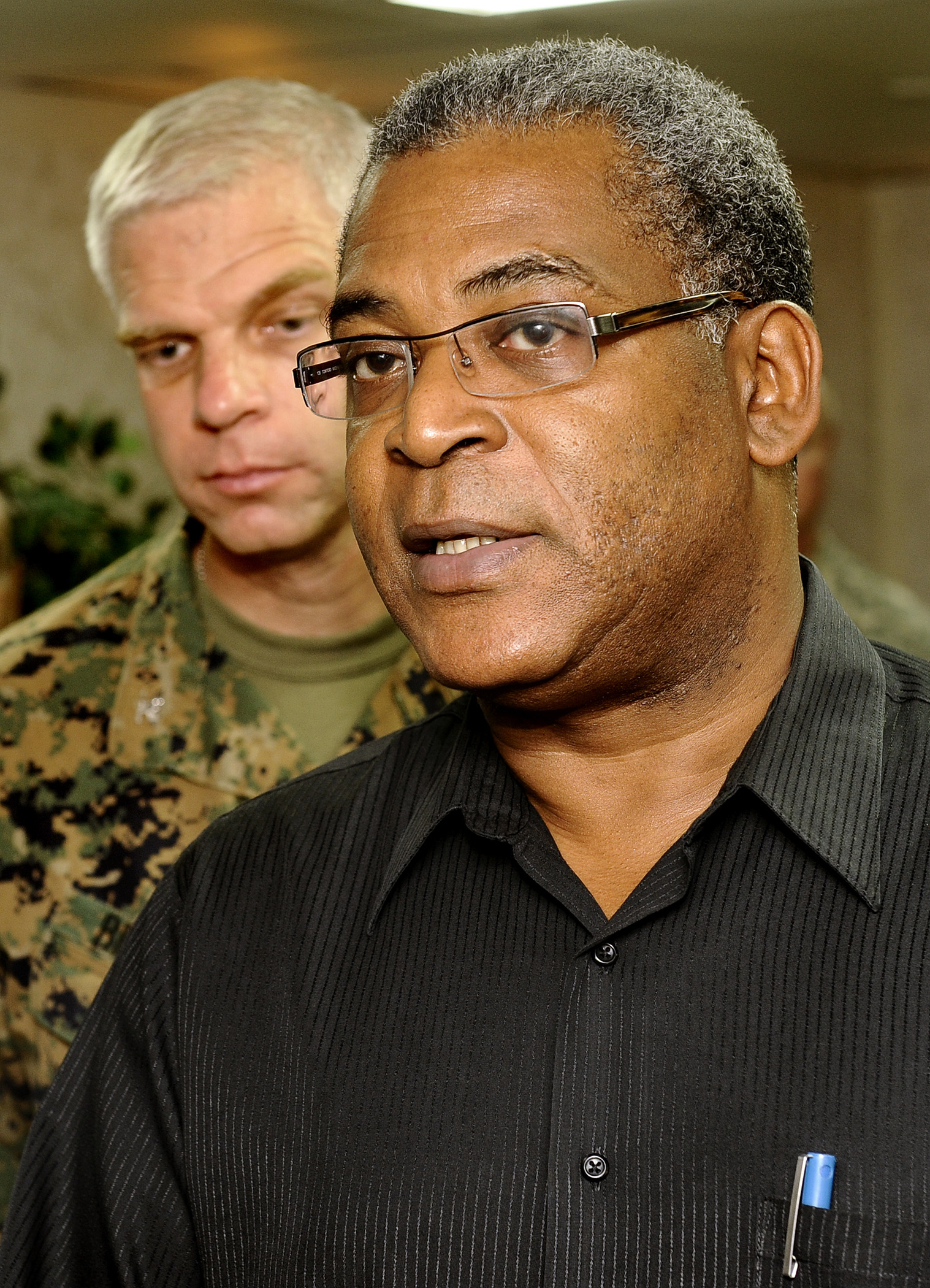
- Bellerive in 2010

14th Prime Minister of Haiti
- In office 11 November 2009 – 18 October 2011
- President: René Préval; Michel Martelly
- Preceded by: Michèle Pierre-Louis
- Succeeded by: Garry Conille

Minister of Planning and External Cooperation and Justice and Public Security
- In office 27 June 2009 – 19 October 2009
- President: Michel Martelly
- Preceded by: Paul Denis (Justice and Public Security)
- Succeeded by: Jude Hervé Day (Planning and External Cooperation); Josué Pierre-Louis (Justice and Public Security)

Minister of Planning and External Cooperation
- In office 9 June 2006 – 27 June 2009
- President: René Préval
- Preceded by: Roland Pierre

Personal details
- Born: Joseph Jean-Max Bellerive; 1958 (age 66–67); Port-au-Prince, Haiti
- Political party: Lespwa
- Spouse: Myriam Estevez De Bellerive

Jean-Max Bellerive (French pronunciation: [ʒɑ̃ maks bɛlʁiv]; born 1958) is a Haitian politician who served as the 14th prime minister of Haiti from 2009 until his resignation in 2011.

== Biography ==
=== Personal life ===
Bellerive was born in Port-au-Prince in 1958. As the son of a prominent doctor, he left Haiti at a very young age to study in Switzerland, France, and Belgium. With a degree in Political Science and International Relations, Bellerive returned to Haiti in 1986, just before the overthrow of Jean-Claude Duvalier. He is married to Myriam Estevez De Bellerive and has two adult daughters, Diana Jennifer Bellerive and Jessica Bellerive.

=== Prime Minister of Haiti ===
Prior to his appointment as Prime Minister, Bellerive was the Minister of Planning and External Cooperation. The Haitian President, René Préval, following the orders of a senate resolution, nominated Bellerive on 30 October 2009 to replace the former Prime Minister, Michèle Pierre-Louis. A day before the nomination, on 29 October 2009, 18 senators of a 29-member senate had voted to dismiss Pierre-Louis on charges that she was performing poorly in leading Haiti's economic recovery efforts in the wake of the destructive 2008 hurricane season.

On 14 May 2011, Bellerive resigned as Prime Minister, so as to allow the country's new president, Michel Martelly, to choose his own prime minister. Martelly selected Daniel Gérard Rouzier to succeed Bellerive. However, the parliament rejected Rouzier.

== Corruption allegations ==
=== 2016 investigation ===
Bellerive was one of several former government officials targeted by the Chair of the Senate's Anti-Corruption Committee, Youri Latortue, in an investigation of the management of the Petrocaribe program.

=== 2017 investigation ===
Reuters reported in December 2017 that Bellerive was banned from leaving the country amid a corruption investigation along with Camille Édouard Jr., who is a former justice minister who served in 2016. He was ordered not to leave by a judge investigating the disappearance of a public procurement official and the 2012 death of a construction manager allegedly connected to the case. Bellerive denied involvement.

=== 2023 U.S. Department of State public designation ===
On 11 December 2023, the U.S. State Department publicly designated Bellerive as pursuant to Section 7031(c) of the Department of State, Foreign Operations, and Related Programs Appropriations Act, 2023, "for abusing his public position by participating in corrupt activity that undermined the integrity of Haiti’s government." Bellerive is not permitted entry into the United States. His immediate family members were also designated.

Political offices
| Preceded by Michèle Pierre-Louis | Prime Minister of Haiti; 2009–2011 | Succeeded by Garry Conille |
