= Michèle Pierre-Louis =

Haitian Prime Minister

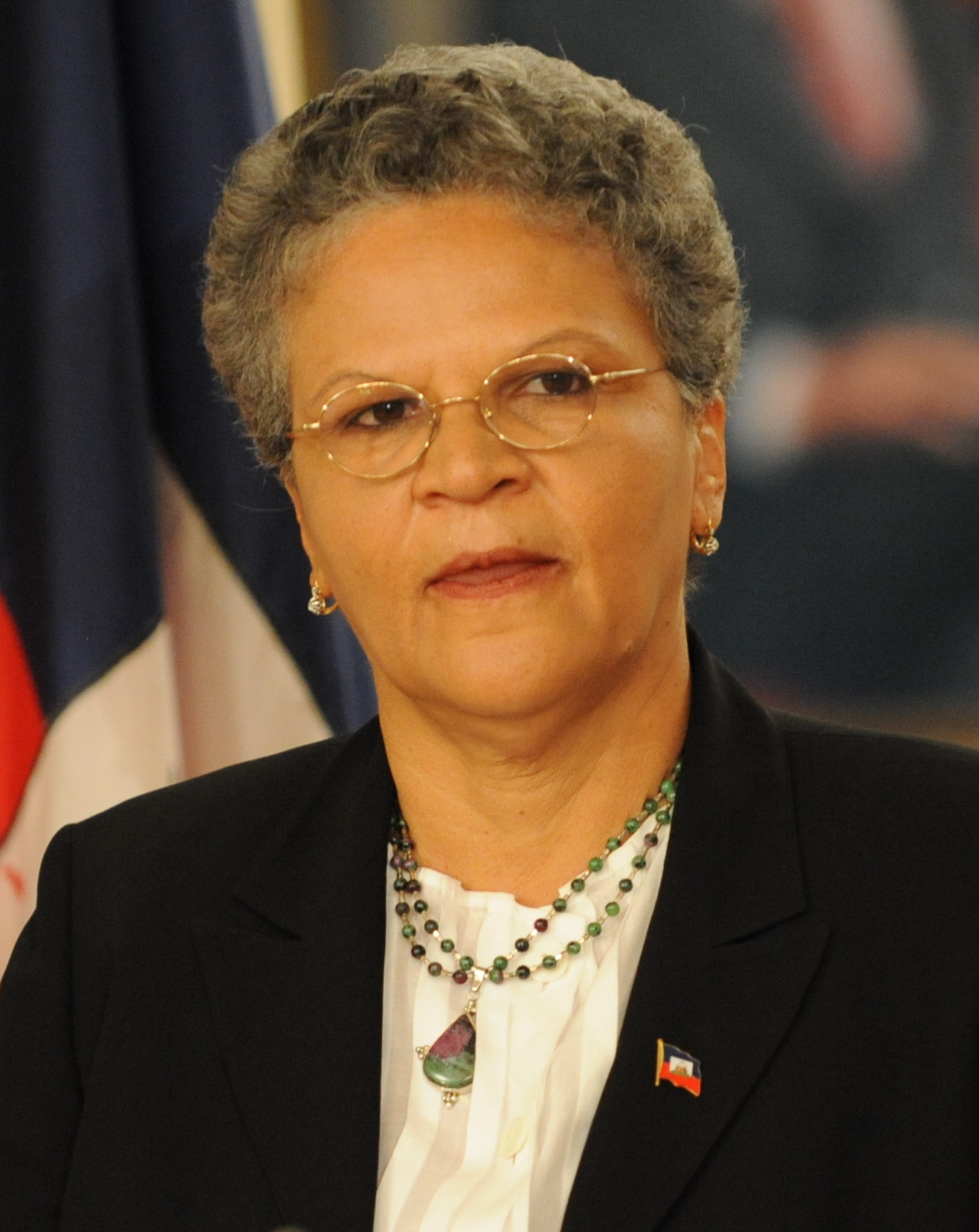
- Pierre-Louis in 2009

14th Prime Minister of Haiti
- In office 5 September 2008 – 11 November 2009
- President: René Préval
- Preceded by: Jacques-Édouard Alexis
- Succeeded by: Jean-Max Bellerive

Personal details
- Born: 5 October 1947 (age 78)
- Party: Independent
- Education: City University of New York, Queens

Michèle Duvivier Pierre-Louis (French pronunciation: [miʃɛl pjɛʁ lwi]; born 5 October 1947) is a Haitian politician who was Prime Minister of Haiti from September 2008 to November 2009. She was Haiti's second female prime minister, after Claudette Werleigh, who served from 1995 to 1996.

== Career ==
Pierre-Louis has been the executive director of the Knowledge and Freedom Foundation (FOKAL), a non-governmental organization financed by George Soros, since 1995. She was the director for 13 years and focused on education, culture, community development, environment, and gender equality.

In June 2008 Pierre-Louis was nominated as prime minister by President René Préval, after Préval's two previous nominees were rejected by the Chamber of Deputies. Her nomination was approved by the Chamber of Deputies on 17 July 2008, with 61 votes in favor, one opposed, and 20 abstentions. It was approved by the Senate on 31 July, with 12 votes in favor, 5 abstentions and none opposed. Her political programme and government still had to be approved by the Chamber of Deputies and the Senate.

Préval announced the composition of the new government on 25 August; aside from Pierre-Louis herself, there were 17 ministers, seven of whom were retained from the previous government of Jacques-Édouard Alexis. Pierre-Louis was appointed as Minister of Justice and Public Security, in addition to serving as prime minister. The government was to have been installed on 26 August, but this was delayed due to the impact of Hurricane Gustav.

Pierre-Louis' political programme and government were approved by the Chamber of Deputies and subsequently by the Senate on 5 September 2008, following extended negotiations. 16 votes were needed in the Senate; she received only 15 in the first vote, but in a second vote held shortly afterward she gained the necessary additional vote. There were no opposing votes, but one senator abstained. This vote occurred as Haiti was ravaged by the effects of Hurricane Hanna and Hurricane Ike, presenting a daunting challenge to Pierre-Louis and her government.

The British weekly news and international affairs publication The Economist referred to Pierre-Louis in their publication "The World in Figures 2010", writing:

Long known as the poorest country in the Western hemisphere, Haiti has stumbled from one crisis to another since the Duvalier years. But under its prime minister, Michèle Pierre-Louis, the country has an opportunity to make substantial and sustainable gains in both economics and politics. Her domestic achievements are already considerable, holding together a diverse coalition and quelling a determined opposition. Abroad, she has worked well with international leaders and won some influential friends, including Bill Clinton, a former US president. The tenure of Ms Pierre-Louis, whose social-activist brother-in-law was assassinated in 1998, may conceivably mark a turning-point in the country's long battle with extreme poverty, bloody confrontation and deep-rooted social injustice.

After a year senators from Préval's party complained that people's living standards were not improving. Others thought it was unfair to place the blame on Pierre-Louis for 200 years of poverty and social inequality, but the prime minister and her cabinet were voted down and out on 11 November 2009.

In the wake of the 2010 Haiti earthquake Pierre-Louis wrote a piece for the Huffington Post outlining her vision for a three-phase plan for the community: rescue, recovery and reconstruction.

== Other activities ==
- Open Society Foundations, Women’s Rights Program, Member of the Advisory Board
- University teacher, courses focused on Culture and Society in the Caribbean".
- In 1986, she worked as a national trainer in a literacy campaign called Mission Alpha.
- From 1989 to 2006 she was a member of the Cheminscritiques where she wrote articles on politics, arts, economics, and culture.

Political offices
Preceded by Jacques-Édouard Alexis	Prime Minister of Haiti; 2008–2009	Succeeded by Jean-Max Bellerive
