= Ministry of Communication (Haiti) =

Government minister of Haiti

- Coat of arms of Haiti

Agency overview
- Jurisdiction: Government of Haiti
- Minister responsible: Emmanuel Ménard
- Website: http://communication.gouv.ht

The Ministry of Culture and Communication (French: Ministère de la Culture et de la Communication) is a ministry of the Government of Haiti. This ministry is responsible for communications and is part of the Prime Minister's Cabinet.
