= List of companies of Haiti =

Location of Haiti

Haiti is a country located on the island of Hispaniola in the Greater Antilles archipelago of the Caribbean Sea. Haiti's purchasing power parity GDP fell 8% in 2010 (from US$12.15 billion to US$11.18 billion) and the GDP per capita remained unchanged at PPP US$1,200. Despite having a viable tourist industry, they may have converted into a public company (like listed with the Haitian Stock Exchange), or have seen a decline in sales, or at worst gone into an insolvency procedure, been sold, broken up, or liquidated. Haiti is one of the world's poorest countries and the poorest in the Americas region, with poverty, corruption, poor infrastructure, lack of health care and lack of education cited as the main sources. The economy receded due to the 2010 earthquake and subsequent outbreak of Cholera. Haiti ranked 145 of 182 countries in the 2010 United Nations Human Development Index, with 57.3% of the population being deprived in at least three of the HDI's poverty measures.

For further information on the types of business entities in this country and their abbreviations, see "Business entities in Haiti".

== Notable firms ==
This list includes notable companies with primary headquarters located in the country. The industry and sector follow the Industry Classification Benchmark taxonomy. Organizations which have ceased operations are included and noted as defunct.

Notable companies Status: P=Private, S=State; A=Active, D=Defunct
Name	Industry	Sector	Headquarters	Founded	Notes	Status	
Balistrad	Consumer services	Publishing	Port-au-Prince	2018	Online newspaper	P	A
Bank of the Republic of Haiti	Financials	Banks	Port-au-Prince	1979	Central bank	S	A
Banque de l'Union Haïtienne	Financials	Banks	Pétion-Ville	1973	Private bank	P	A
Brasserie de la Couronne	Consumer goods	Soft drinks	Port-au-Prince	1924	Soft drink beverages	P	A
Brasserie Nationale d'Haïti	Consumer goods	Brewers	Port-au-Prince	1973	Brewery	P	A
Capital Bank	Financials	Banks	Pétion-Ville	1986	Commercial bank	P	A
Caribintair	Consumer services	Airlines	Port-au-Prince	1989	Airline, defunct 2009	P	D
Comme Il Faut	Consumer goods	Tobacco	Port-au-Prince	1927	Tobacco	P	A
Fonkoze	Financials	Banks	Port-au-Prince	1994	Microfinance	P	A
GB Group	Conglomerate	Various	Port-au-Prince	1972	Conglomerate	P	A
Haïti Ambassador Airlines	Consumer services	Airlines	Port-au-Prince	2002	Airline, defunct	P	D
Haitian American Sugar Company	Consumer goods	Food products	Port-au-Prince	1912	Defunct 1987	P	D
Haïti Trans Air	Consumer services	Airlines	Port-au-Prince	1986	Airline, defunct 1995	P	D
Handxom	Technology	Computer hardware	Pétion-Ville	2013	Electronics	P	A
Hôtel Montana	Consumer services	Hotels	Pétion-Ville	1947	Hotel	P	A
Hotel Oloffson	Consumer services	Hotels	Port-au-Prince	1935	Hotel	P	A
Le Matin	Consumer services	Publishing	Pétion-Ville	1907	Daily newspaper	P	D
Le Nouvelliste	Consumer services	Publishing	Port-au-Prince	1898	Daily newspaper	P	A
PromoCapital	Financials	Banks	Pétion-Ville	2004	Investment bank	P	D
Radio Caraïbes	Consumer services	Broadcasting & entertainment	Port-au-Prince	1949	Radio station	P	A
Radio Kiskeya	Consumer services	Broadcasting & entertainment	Port-au-Prince	1994	Radio station	P	A
Radio Lumière	Consumer services	Broadcasting & entertainment	Port-au-Prince	1958	Radio station	P	A
Radio Métropole	Consumer services	Broadcasting & entertainment	Port-au-Prince	1970	Radio station	P	A
Radio Scoop FM	Consumer services	Broadcasting & entertainment	Port-au-Prince	?	Radio station	P	A
Radio Vision 2000	Consumer services	Broadcasting & entertainment	Port-au-Prince	?	Radio station	P	A
Rhum Barbancourt	Consumer goods	Distillers & vintners	Port-au-Prince	1862	Distilled beverages	P	A
Rhum Vieux Labbé	Consumer goods	Distillers & vintners	Port-au-Prince	1862	Distilled beverages	P	A
Salsa d'Haïti	Consumer services	Airlines	Port-au-Prince	2008	Airline defunct 2013	P	D
Signal FM	Consumer services	Broadcasting & entertainment	Pétion-Ville	1990	Radio station	P	A
Sogebank	Financials	Banks	Port-au-Prince	1985	Commercial bank	P	A
Sunrise Airways	Consumer services	Airlines	Port-au-Prince	2010	Airline	P	A
Sûrtab	Technology	Computer hardware	Port-au-Prince	2013	Hardware, tablets	P	A
Tele Quisqueya	Consumer services	Broadcasting & entertainment	Saint-Marc	?	Television station	P	A
Télévision Nationale d'Haïti	Consumer services	Broadcasting & entertainment	Port-au-Prince	1979	State broadcaster	S	A
Tortug' Air	Consumer services	Airlines	Port-au-Prince	2003	Airline, defunct 2015	P	D
Unibank	Financials	Banks	Pétion-Ville	1993	Commercial bank	P	A

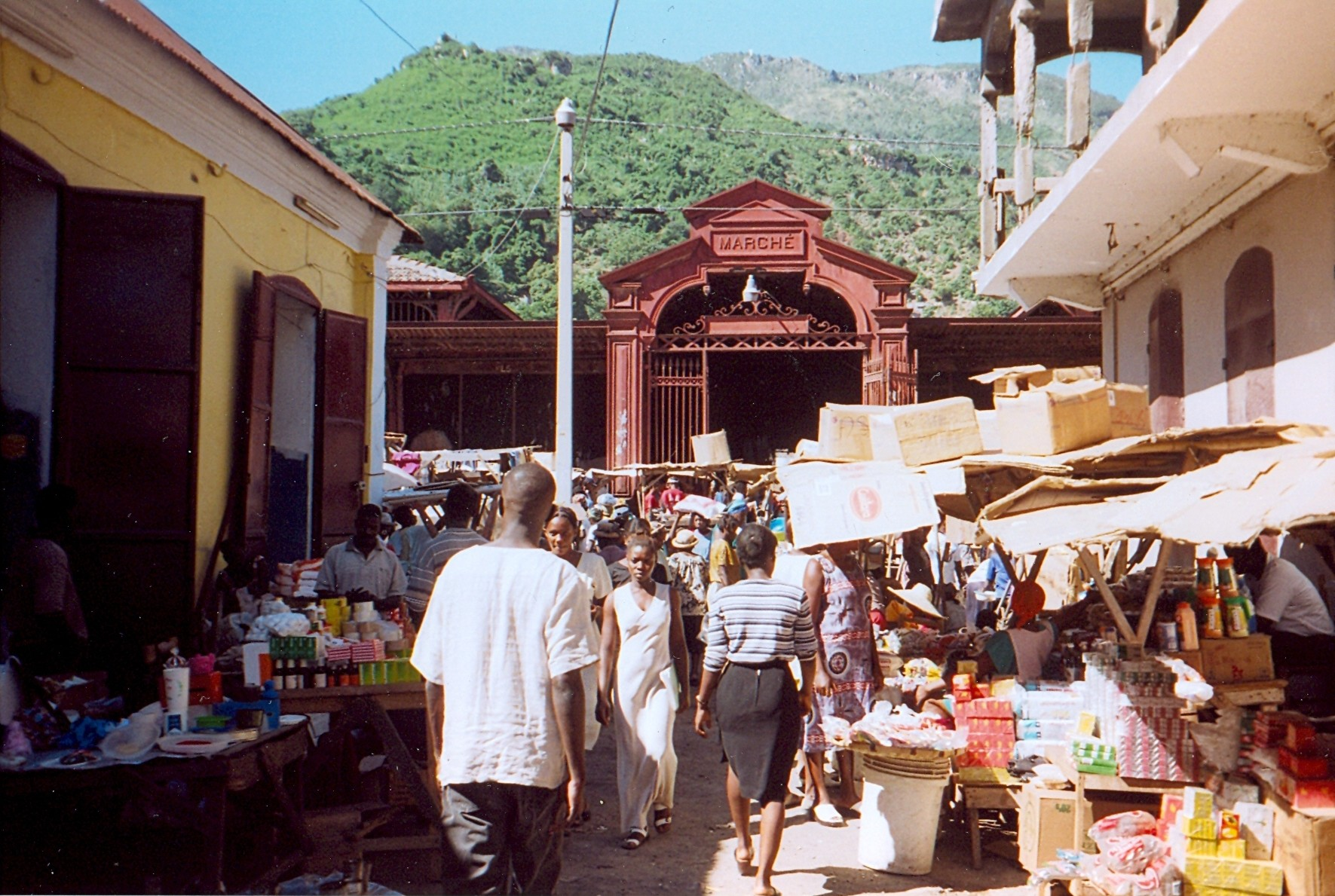
A market in Cap Haitien

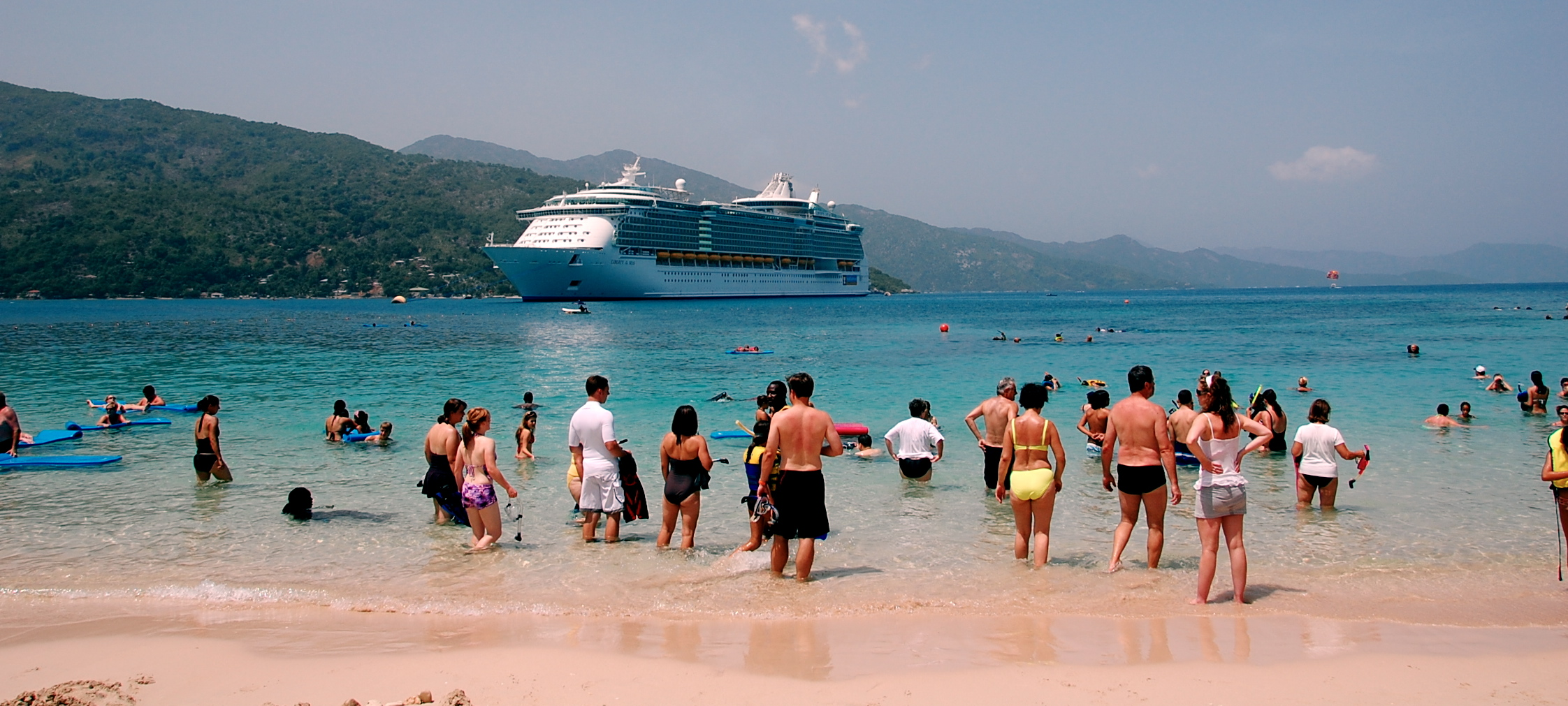
Labadee, a cruise ship destination
