= Economy of Haiti =

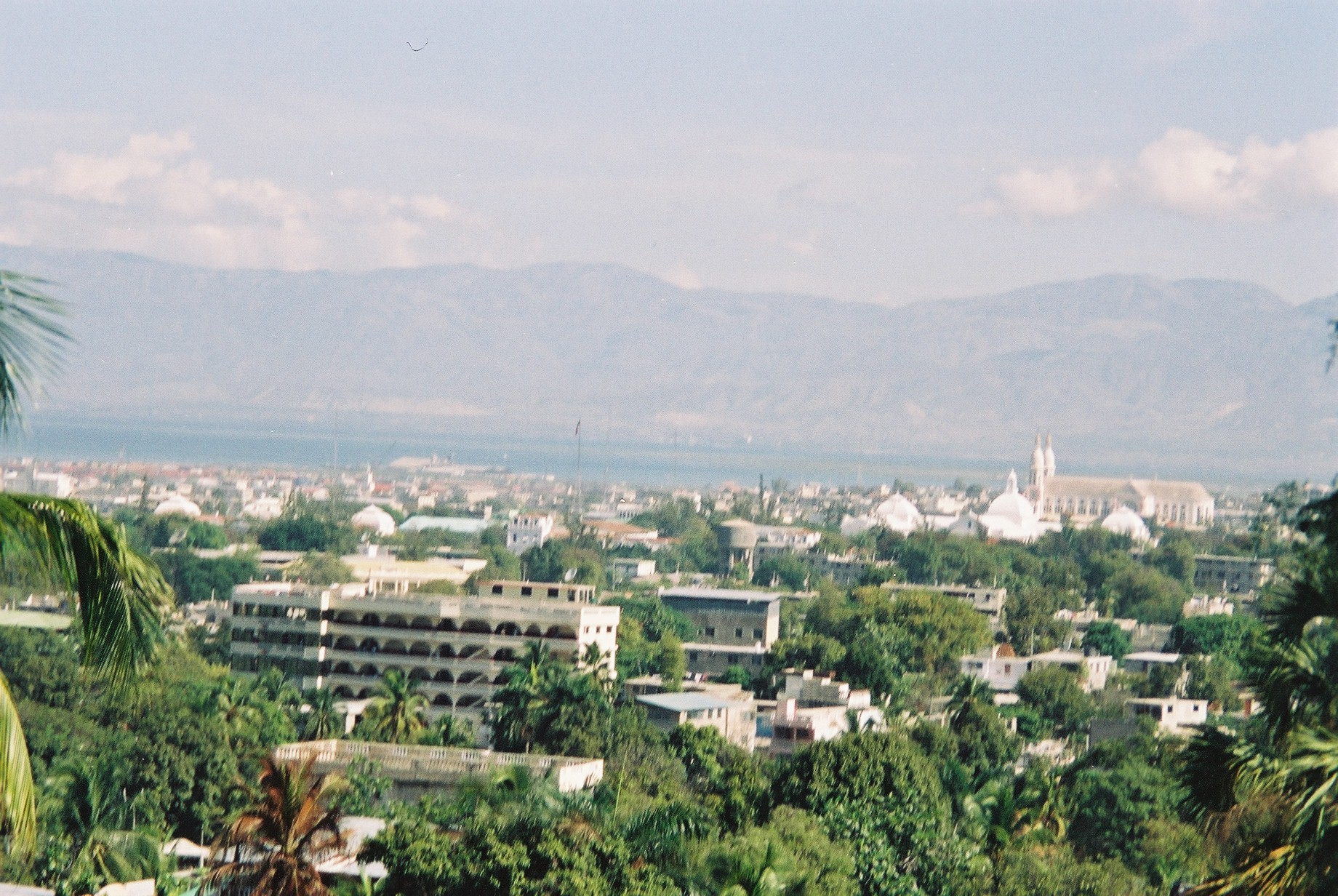
- Port-au-Prince, the capital of Haiti
- Currency: Haitian gourde (HTG)
- Fiscal year: 1 October – 30 September
- Trade organizations: CARICOM, WTO
- Country group: Least developed countries; Lower-middle income economy

Statistics
- GDP: ▲$33.55 billion (nominal; 2025); ▲$38.2 billion (PPP; 2025)
- GDP rank: 113th (nominal; 2025); 143rd (PPP; 2025)
- GDP growth: 1.1% (2025); 1.0% (2026f)
- GDP per capita: ▲$2,670 (nominal; 2025); ▲$3,040 (PPP; 2025)
- GDP per capita rank: 152nd (nominal; 2025); 170th (PPP; 2025)
- GDP per capita growth: -3.8% (2025)
- GDP by sector: Agriculture 21.9% industry 20.8% services 57.3% (2017 est.)
- Inflation (CPI): 12.885% (2018)
- Population below national poverty line: 58.5% (2012 est.)
- Gini coefficient: 41.1 medium (2012)
- Human Development Index: ▲0.552 medium (2022) (158th); ▲0.335 low IHDI (141st) (2022)
- Labor force: 4.594 million
- Labor force by occupation: Agriculture 38.1% industry 11.5% services 50.4% (2010 est.)
- Unemployment: 13.2%
- Youth unemployment: ▲37.5% (2025)
- Main industries: Sugar refining, flour milling, textile, cement, light assembly, industries based on imported parts

External
- Exports: $960.1 million (2017 est.)
- Export goods: apparel, manufactures, essential oils (Vetiver), cocoa, mangoes, coffee, bitter oranges (Grand Marnier)
- Main export partners: United States 84.2% (2022)
- Imports: $3.621 billion (2017 est.)
- Import goods: food, manufactured goods, machinery and transport equipment, fuels, raw materials
- Main import partners: United States 30.8%; Dominican Republic 26.1%; China 16% (2022)
- FDI stock: $1.46 billion (31 December 2017 est.)
- Gross external debt: $2.607 billion (31 December 2017 est.)

Public finance
- Government debt: 31.1% of GDP (2017 est.)
- Foreign reserves: $2.044 billion (31 December 2017 est.)
- Revenue: $1.58 billion (2017 est.)
- Spending: $2.251 billion (2017 est.)
- Economic aid: $600 million (FY04 est.)
- All values, unless otherwise stated, are in US dollars.

Haiti has a free market economy with low labor costs. A republic, it was a French colony before gaining independence in an uprising by its enslaved people. It faced embargoes and isolation after its independence as well as political crises punctuated by foreign interventions and devastating natural disasters. Haiti's estimated population in 2018 was 11,439,646. The Economist reported in 2010: "Long known as the poorest country in the Western hemisphere, Haiti has stumbled from one crisis to another since the Duvalier (François Duvalier) years."

Haiti has an agricultural economy. Over half of the world's vetiver oil (an essential oil used in high-end perfumes) comes from Haiti. Bananas, cocoa, and mangoes are important export crops. Haiti has also moved to expand to higher-end manufacturing, producing Android-based tablets and current sensors and transformers. Its major trading partner is the United States (US), which provides the country with preferential trade access to the US market through the Haiti Hemispheric Opportunity through Partnership Encouragement (HOPE) and the Haiti Economic Lift Program Encouragement Acts (HELP) legislation.

Vulnerability to natural disasters, as well as poverty and limited access to education are among Haiti's most serious disadvantages. Two-fifths of all Haitians depend on the agriculture sector, mainly small-scale subsistence farming, and remain vulnerable to damage from frequent natural disasters, exacerbated by the country's widespread deforestation. Haiti maintains a trade deficit, which it is working to address by moving into higher-end manufacturing and more value-added products in the agriculture sector. Remittances are the primary source of foreign exchange, equaling nearly 20% of GDP. Haiti's economy was severely impacted by the 2010 Haiti earthquake which occurred on 12 January 2010.

== Economic history ==
Historical GDP per capita development

Before the Haitian Revolution against French colonial rule, Haiti ranked as the world's richest and most productive colony. The colonial sugar plantations were destroyed during the revolutionary war. Restoring them after the war was made difficult by difficulties in attracting capital and hiring ex-slaves to work on the plantations. The Haitian economy shifted towards coffee production, which was more suited to free labor, becoming a major exporter of coffee in the first half of the 19th century.

Problems of weak state capacity and adverse international relations harmed the Haitian economy following independence. In the formative years of independence, Haiti suffered from isolation on the international stage, as evidenced by the early lack of diplomatic recognition accorded to it by Europe and the United States (which did not recognize it until 1862); this had a negative impact on investment in Haiti. Another economic obstacle in Haiti's early independence was its payment of 150 million francs to France beginning in 1825; this did much to drain the country of its capital stock. France forced Haiti to pay for its independence and freedom from colonization. The authors of a 2014 study write:

For the newborn 'Negro republic', it was hard to become recognised as a sovereign nation state, it was difficult to form strategic alliances, to get access to foreign loans, and to safeguard trade interests, and it was overloaded with debt under threat of external violence (the French indemnity). Self-chosen isolation, for instance by prohibiting foreign landownership, further reduced the choice set of successive Haitian administrations. When opportunities for export-led growth opened up in the late 19th century, the odds were stacked against Haiti.

The United States invaded and occupied Haiti from 1915 to 1934.

In 1957 François "Papa Doc" Duvalier won the Haitian presidential election. His tenure brought extreme economic damage, with more than half of the government budget drained away from productive spending onto the Presidential Guard and Tonton Macoutes militia. A government account known as the Régie du Tabac collected revenue from the governmental tobacco monopoly, revenue from taxes on cotton and sugar, alongside fees for import licenses, government franchises and state authorized monopolies on the sale of cement, matches, flour and automobiles, monopolies that were granted to private businessmen in return for kickbacks. In total, the Regie du Tabac was estimated to have provided Duvalier with $10 million per annum.

In the aftermath of the 1994 restoration of constitutional governance, Haitian officials have indicated their commitment to economic reform through the implementation of sound fiscal and monetary policies and the enactment of legislation mandating the modernization of state-owned enterprises. A council to guide the modernization program (CMEP) was established and a timetable was drawn up to modernize nine key parastatals. Although the state-owned flour-mill and cement plants have been transferred to private owners, progress on the other seven parastatals has stalled. The modernization of Haiti's state-enterprises remains a controversial political issue in Haiti.

Under President René Préval (1996–2001, 2006 – 14 May 2011), the country's economic agenda included trade and tariff liberalization, measures to control government expenditure and increase tax revenues, civil-service downsizing, financial-sector reform, the privatization of state-owned enterprises, and the provision of private sector management contracts, or joint public-private investment. Structural adjustment agreements with the International Monetary Fund, World Bank, Inter-American Development Bank, and other international financial institutions aiming at creating necessary conditions for private sector growth, have proved only partly successful.

Comparative social and economic indicators show Haiti falling behind other low-income developing countries (particularly in the Western hemisphere) since the 1980s. Haiti's economic stagnation results from earlier inappropriate economic policies, political instability, a shortage of good arable land, environmental deterioration, continued use of traditional technologies, under-capitalization and lack of public investment in human resources, migration of large portions of the skilled population, and a weak national savings rate.

Haiti continues to suffer the consequences of the 1991 coup. The irresponsible economic and financial policies of de facto authorities greatly accelerated Haiti's economic decline. Following the coup, the United States adopted mandatory sanctions, and the OAS instituted voluntary sanctions aimed at restoring constitutional government. International sanctions culminated in the May 1994 United Nations embargo of all goods entering Haiti except humanitarian supplies, such as food and medicine. The assembly sector, heavily dependent on U.S. markets for its products, employed nearly 80,000 workers in the mid-1980s. During the embargo, employment fell from 33,000 workers in 1991 to 400 in October 1995. Private, domestic and foreign investment has been slow to return to Haiti. Since the return of constitutional rule, assembly sector employment has gradually recovered with over 20,000 now employed, but further growth has been stalled by investor concerns over safety and supply reliability.

Remittances from abroad have consistently constituted a significant source of financial support for many Haitian households.

The Haitian Ministry of Economy and Finance designed the Haiti economic reforms of 1996 to rebuild the economy of Haiti after significant downturns suffered in the previous years. The primary reforms centered around the Emergency Economic Recovery Plan (EERP) and were followed by budget reforms.

Haiti's real GDP growth turned negative in FY 2001 after six years of growth. Real GDP fell by 1.1% in FY 2001 and 0.9% in FY 2002. Macroeconomic stability was adversely affected by political uncertainty, the collapse of informal banking cooperatives, high budget deficits, low investment, and reduced international capital flows, including suspension of IFI lending as Haiti fell into arrears with the Inter-American Development Bank (IDB) and World Bank.

Haiti's economy stabilized in 2003. Although FY 2003 began with the rapid decline of the gourde due to rumors that U.S. dollar deposit accounts would be nationalized and due to the withdrawal of fuel subsidies, the government successfully stabilized the gourde as it took the politically difficult decisions to float fuel prices freely according to world market prices and to raise interest rates. Government agreement with the International Monetary Fund (IMF) on a staff monitored program (SMP), followed by its payment of its $32 million arrears to the IDB in July, paved the way for renewed IDB lending. The IDB disbursed $35 million of a $50 million policy-based loan in July and began disbursing four previously approved project loans totaling $146 million. The IDB, IMF, and World Bank also discussed new lending with the government. Much of this would be contingent on government adherence to fiscal and monetary targets and policy reforms, such as those begun under the SMP, and Haiti's payment of its World Bank arrears ($30 million at 9/30/03).

The IMF estimated that real GDP was flat in FY 2003 and projected 1% real GDP growth for FY 2004. However, GDP per capita – amounting to $425 in FY 2002 – will continue to decline as population growth is estimated at 1.3% p.a. While implementation of governance reforms and peaceful resolution of the political stalemate are key to long-term growth, external support remains critical in avoiding economic collapse. The major element is foreign remittances, reported as $931 million in 2002, primarily from the U.S. Foreign assistance, meanwhile, was $130 million in FY 2002. Overall foreign assistance levels have declined since FY 1995, the year elected government was restored to power under a United Nations mandate, when the international community provided over $600 million in aid.

A legal minimum wage of 36 gourdes a day (about U.S. $1.80) was set in 1995, and applies to most workers in the formal sector. It was later raised to 70 gourdes per day. This minimum is 200 gourdes a day (about U.S. $4.80). One U.S. dollar is equal to 39.175 gourdes.

Haiti's economy suffered a severe setback in January 2010 when a 7.0 magnitude earthquake destroyed much of its capital city, Port-au-Prince, and neighboring areas. Already the poorest country in the Americas with 80% of the population living under the poverty line and 54% in abject poverty, the earthquake inflicted $7.8 billion in damage and caused the country's GDP to contract 5.4% in 2010. Following the earthquake, Haiti received $4.59 billion in international pledges for reconstruction, which has proceeded slowly.

Chart showing the history of Haiti's GDP.

US economic engagement under the Haitian Hemispheric Opportunity through Partnership Encouragement (HOPE) Act, passed in December 2006, has boosted apparel exports and investment by providing duty-free access to the US. Congress voted in 2010 to extend the legislation until 2020 under the HELP Act; the apparel sector accounts for about 90% of Haitian exports and nearly one-tenth of GDP. Remittances are the primary source of foreign exchange, equaling nearly 20% of GDP and more than twice the earnings from exports. Haiti suffers from a lack of investment, partly because of limited infrastructure and a lack of security. In 2005, Haiti paid its arrears to the World Bank, paving the way for reengagement with the Bank. Haiti received debt forgiveness for over $1 billion through the Highly-Indebted Poor Country initiative in mid-2009. The remainder of its outstanding external debt was cancelled by donor countries following the 2010 earthquake but has since risen to over $600 million. The government relies on formal international economic assistance for fiscal sustainability, with over half of its annual budget coming from outside sources. The Michel Martelly administration in 2011 launched a campaign aimed at drawing foreign investment into Haiti as a means for sustainable development.

While international lenders canceled Haiti's debt following the 2010 earthquake, additional loans, corruption, and mismanagement of aid caused public debt to rise in the ensuing years. Haiti's general government gross debt in 2025 was forecast to reach roughly 12 percent of its GDP, according to the International Monetary Fund. Further upheaval that began with mass protests in 2018 and calls for President Jovenel Moïse's resignation in response to increased fuel prices and the removal of government subsidies, accusations of corruption, a worsening economic crisis, and dispute over his administration's legitimacy that eventually resulted in his assassination in July 2021, back-to-back natural disasters in July and August 2021, and rampant gang violence have placed additional strain on the country's economy.

== Poverty, social class and structural violence ==
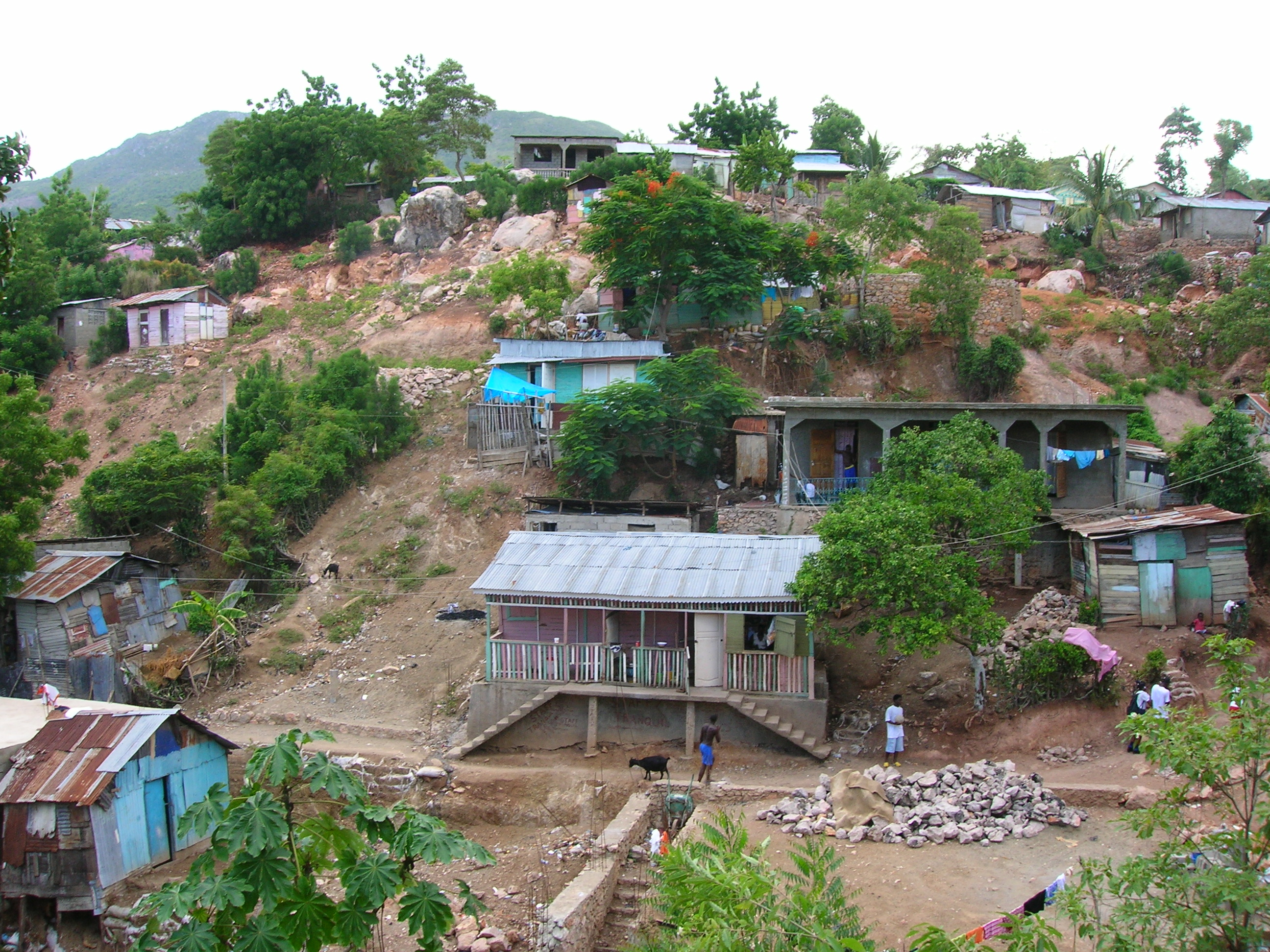
Slums in the area of Bas-Ravine, in the northern part of Cap-Haïtien

Poverty in Haiti is a long lasting issue that affects the residents on a daily basis playing a significant role in their everyday lives. Issues including housing, nutrition, education, healthcare, infant mortality rates, and environmental factors are very common amongst the poorest communities in the nation. Haiti has long struggled with poor living conditions in the more rural areas of the country causing many Haitians to migrate towards the capital city of Port-au-Prince. Poverty in Haiti is regarded as among the most severe in the Western Hemisphere.

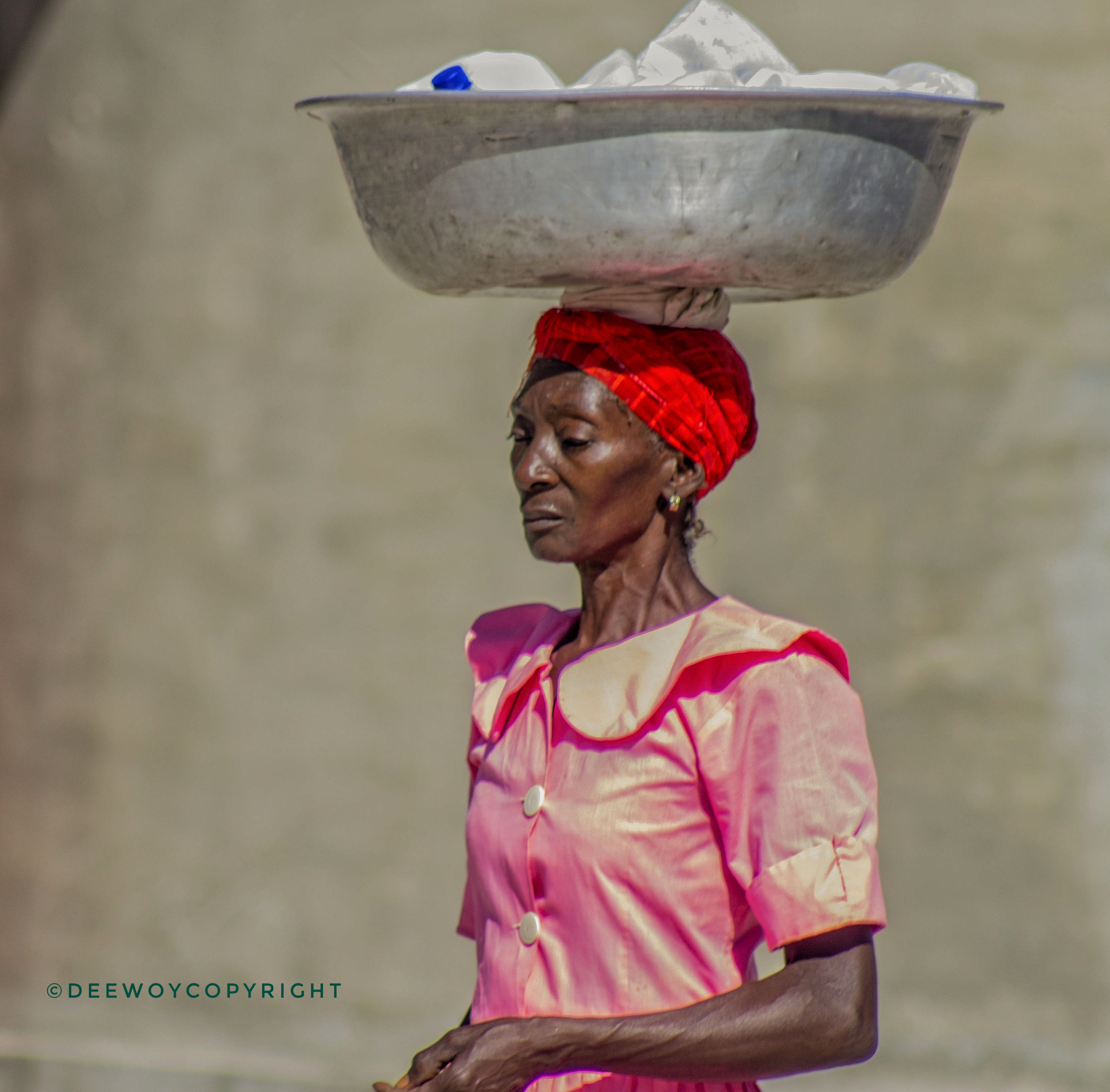
A merchant woman in Haiti

Social class in Haiti is defined by a class structure that groups people according to wealth, income, education, type of occupation, and membership in a specific subculture or social network. Race has also played an important factor in determining social class since the colonial period (1625–1804) when Haiti was the French colony of Saint-Domingue.

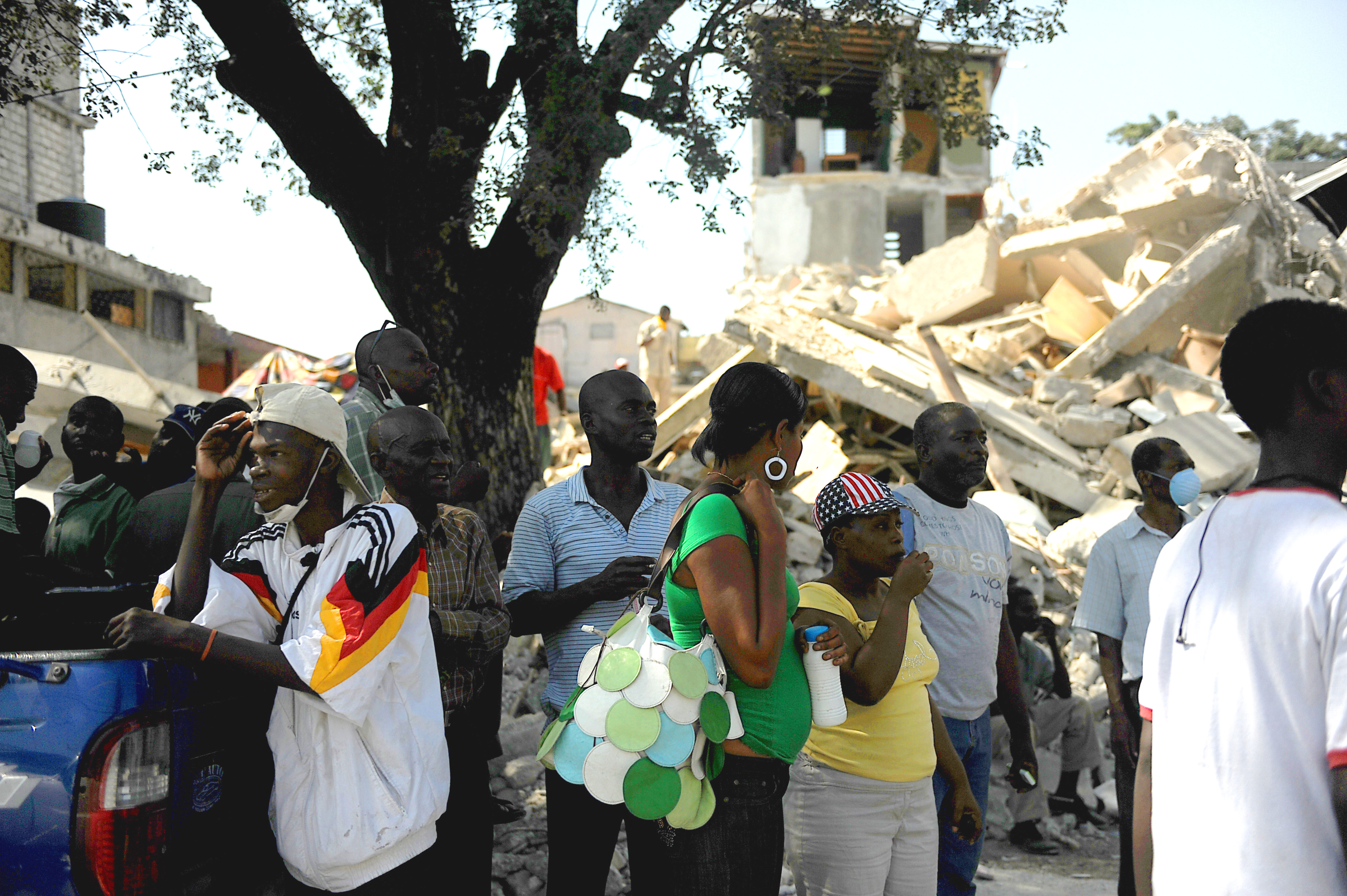
Haitians walk by damaged buildings in downtown Port-au-Prince, Haiti, after the earthquake in 2010.

Haiti is impacted by structural violence, a form of dysfunction where social structures prevent certain groups of people from having access to basic human rights, like education and healthcare. This has resulted from decades of political instability and social unrest. Additionally, Haitians are financially impoverished and within Haiti, there exist social inequalities. In 2012, 58.5% of its population was below its poverty line. Educational standards within the nation are low, where its literacy rate is about 60.7%, below the 84.1% global average. Haiti is also globally ranked lower than most other nations in various measurements of health outcomes. Such health outcomes include life expectancy, mortality rates, and disease levels. While there has been some international assistance, there are insufficient supportive infrastructures in place within the country to provide resources and opportunities for Haitians who are trying to attain a higher quality of life. Causes that have resulted in higher levels of structural violence within Haiti include political instability and corruption, as well as the impact of post-colonialism, which has established a caste-based class system within Haiti.

== Foreign aid ==
Haiti—an island country 600 mi (970 km) off the coast of the U.S. state of Florida—shares the Caribbean island of Hispaniola with the Dominican Republic. Haiti has received billions in foreign assistance, yet persists as one of the poorest countries and has the lowest human development index in the Americas. There have been more than 15 natural disasters since 2001 including tropical storms, flooding, earthquakes and hurricanes. The international donor community classifies Haiti as a fragile state. Haiti is also considered a post-conflict state—one emerging from a recent coup d'état and civil war.

== Debt cancellation ==
In 2005 Haiti's total external debt reached an estimated US$1.3 billion, which corresponds to debt per capita of US$169, in contrast to the debt per capita of the United States which is US$102,000. Following the democratic election of Aristide in December 1990, many international creditors responded by cancelling significant amounts of Haiti's debt, bringing the total down to US$777 million in 1991. However, new borrowing during the 1990s swelled the debt to more than US$1 billion.

At peak, Haiti's total external debt was estimated at 1.8 billion dollars, including half a billion dollars to the Inter-American Development Bank, Haiti's largest creditor. In September 2009, Haiti met the conditions set out by the IMF and World Bank's Heavily Indebted Poor Countries program, qualifying it for cancellation of some of its external debt. This amounted to a cancellation of $1.2 billion. Despite this as of 2010 calls for cancellation of its remaining $1 billion debts came strongly from civil society groups such as the Jubilee Debt Campaign in reaction to the effects of the earthquake that hit the country.

== Primary industries ==
Primary industries are crucial to maintaining Haiti's economic diversity and relevance internationally.

=== Agriculture, forestry, and fishing ===
Although many Haitians make their living through subsistence farming, Haiti also has an agricultural export sector. Agriculture, together with forestry and fishing, accounts for about one-quarter (28% in 2004) of Haiti's annual gross domestic product and employs about two-thirds (66% in 2004) of the labor force. However, expansion has been difficult because mountains cover much of the countryside and limit the land available for cultivation. Of the total arable land of 550,000 hectares, 125,000 hectares are suited for irrigation, and of those only 75,000 hectares actually have been improved with irrigation. Haiti's dominant cash crops include coffee, mangoes, and cocoa. Haiti has decreased its production of sugarcane, traditionally an important cash crop, because of declining prices and fierce international competition. Because Haiti's forests have thinned dramatically, timber exports have declined. Roundwood removals annually total about 1,000 kilograms. Haiti also has a small fishing industry. Annual catches in recent years have totaled about 5,000 tons.

=== Mining and minerals ===
Haiti has a mining industry which extracted minerals worth approximately US$13 million in 2013. Bauxite, copper, calcium carbonate, gold, and marble were the most extensively extracted minerals in Haiti. Lime and aggregates and to a lesser extent marble are extracted. Gold was mined by the Spanish in early colonial times. Bauxite was mined for a number of years in recent times at a site near Miragoâne on the Southern peninsula. Operating from 1960 to 1972 International Halliwell Mines, Ltd. ("Halliwell"), a Canadian corporation, through its wholly owned Haitian subsidiary, La Societe d'Exploitation et de Developpement Economique et Natural d'Haiti ("Sedren") mined copper near Gonaïves.

0.5 million tons of ore were exported. The copper ore was valued at about $83.5 million. The government of Haiti received about $3 million. As of 2012 there was promise of gold and copper mining in northern Haiti.

==== Gold ====
In 2012, it was reported that confidential agreements and negotiations had been entered into by the Haitian government granting licenses for exploration or mining of gold and associated metals such as copper for over 1,000 square miles (2,600 km^{2}) in the mineralized zone stretching from east to west across northern Haiti. Estimates for the value of the gold which might be extracted through open-pit mining are as high as US$20 billion. Eurasian Minerals and Newmont Mining Corporation are two of the firms involved. According to Alex Dupuy, Chair of African American Studies and John E. Andrus Professor of Sociology at Wesleyan University the ability of Haiti to adequately manage the mining operations or to obtain and use funds obtained from the operations for the benefit of its people is untested and seriously questioned. Lakwèv, where earth dug from hand-made tunnels is washed for specks of free gold by local residents, is one of the locations. In the same mineralized zone in the Dominican Republic Barrick Gold and Goldcorp are planning on reopening the Pueblo Viejo mine.

== Secondary industries ==
Secondary industries in Haiti are beset by a variety of problems, while having some austerity measures to counteract them.

=== Manufacturing ===
The leading industries in Haiti produce beverages, butter, cement, detergent, edible oils, flour, refined sugar, soap, and textiles. Growth in both manufacturing and industry as a whole has been slowed by a lack of capital investment. Grants from the United States and other countries have targeted this problem, but without much success. Private home building and construction appear to be one subsector with positive prospects for growth.

In 2004 industry accounted for about 20 percent of the gross domestic product (GDP), and less than 10 percent of the labor force worked in industrial production. As a portion of the GDP, the manufacturing sector has contracted since the 1980s. The United Nations embargo of 1994 put out of work most of the 80,000 workers in the assembly sector. Additionally, the years of military rule following the presidential coup in 1991 resulted in the closure of most of Haiti's offshore assembly plants in the free zones surrounding Port-au-Prince. When President Aristide returned to Haiti, some improvements did occur in the manufacturing sector.

Haiti's cheaper labor brought some textile and garment assembly work back to the island in the late 1990s. Although these gains were undercut by international competition, the apparel sector in 2008 made up two-thirds of Haiti's annual 490 million US dollars exports. USA economic engagement under the HOPE Act, from December 2006, increased apparel exports and investment by providing tariff-free access to the USA. HOPE II, in October 2008, further improved the situation by extending preferences to 2018.

=== Energy ===
Haiti uses very little energy, the equivalent of approximately 250 kilograms of oil per head per year. In 2003, Haiti produced 546 million kilowatt-hours of electricity while consuming 508 million kilowatt-hours. In 2013, it stood 135th out of 135 countries in net total consumption of electricity.

Most of the country's energy comes from the burning of wood. Haiti imports oil, consuming about 11,800 barrels per day (1,880 m^{3}/d), as of 2003. The Péligre Dam, the country's largest, provides the capital city of Port-au-Prince with energy. Thermal plants provide electricity to the rest of the country. Even with the country's low level of demand for energy, the supply of electricity traditionally has been sporadic and prone to shortages. Mismanagement by the state has offset more than US$100 million in foreign investment targeted at improving Haiti's energy infrastructure. Businesses have resorted to securing back-up power sources to deal with the regular outages. The potential for greater hydropower exists, should Haiti have the desire and means to develop it. The government controls oil and gas prices, to an extent insulating Haitians from international price fluctuations.

== Tertiary industries ==
Haiti relies significantly on tertiary industries for its economy.

=== Services ===
Haiti's services sector made up 52 percent of the country's gross domestic product in 2004 and employed 25 percent of the labor force. According to World Bank statistics, the services sector is one of the few sectors of Haiti's economy that sustained steady, if modest, growth throughout the 1990s.

=== Banking ===
Lack of a stable and trustworthy banking system has impeded Haiti's economic development. Banks in Haiti have collapsed on a regular basis. Most Haitians do not have access to loans of any sort. When reelected in 2000, President Aristide promised to remedy this situation but instead introduced a non-sustainable plan of "cooperatives" that guaranteed investors a 10 percent rate of return. By 2000, the cooperatives had crumbled and Haitians had collectively lost more than US$200 million in savings.

Haiti's central bank, the Bank of the Republic of Haiti, oversees 10 commercial banks and two foreign banks operating in the country. Most banking takes place in the capital city of Port-au-Prince. The United Nations and the International Monetary Fund have led efforts to diversify and expand the finance sector, making credit more available to rural populations. In 2002, the Canadian International Development Agency led a training program for Haitian Credit Unions.

Haiti has no stock exchange.

=== Education ===
The Haitian Educational System yields the lowest total rate in the education realm of the Western Hemisphere. Haiti's literacy rate of about 61% (64.3% for males and 57.3% for females) is below the 90% average literacy rate for Latin American and Caribbean countries. The country faces shortages in educational supplies and qualified teachers. The rural population is less educated than the urban. The 2010 Haiti earthquake exacerbated the already constrained parameters on Haiti's educational system by destroying infrastructure and displacing 50–90% of the students, depending on locale.

International private schools (run by Canada, France, or the United States) and church-run schools educate 90% of students. Haiti has 15,200 primary schools, of which 90% are non-public and managed by communities, religious organizations or NGOs. The enrollment rate for primary school is 88%. Secondary schools enroll 20% of eligible-age children. Higher education is provided by universities and other public and private institutions.

The educational sector is under the responsibility of the Ministère de l'Éducation Nationale et de la Formation Professionnelle (MENFP). The Ministry provides very little funds to support public education. As a result, the private sector has become a substitute for governmental public investment in education as opposed to an addition. The Ministry is limited in its ability to improve the quality of education in Haiti.

Despite the deficiencies of the Haitian education sector, some Haitian leaders have attempted to make improving education a national goal. The country has attempted three major reform efforts, with a new one in progress as a response to the earthquake.

=== Healthcare ===
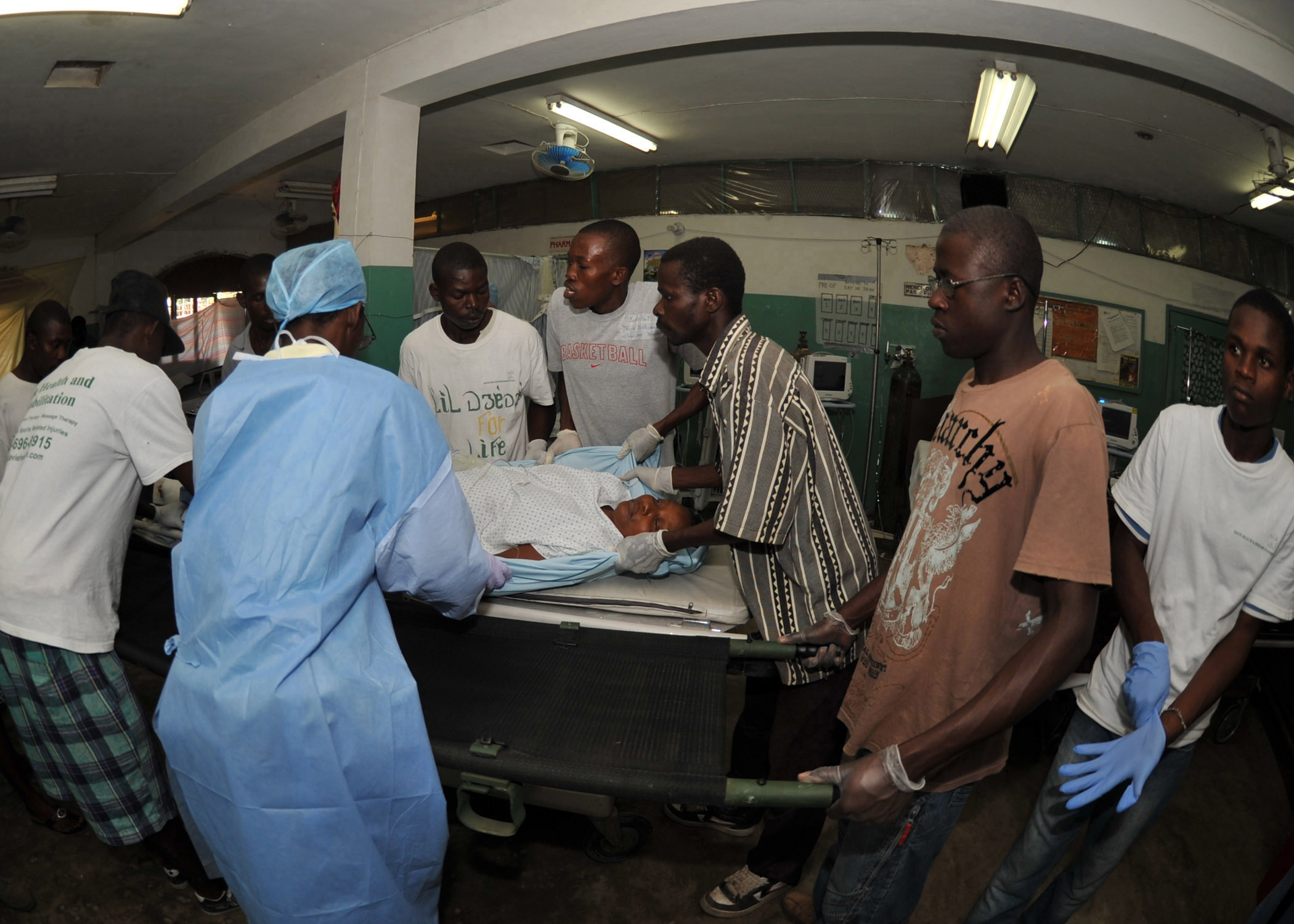
Medical personnel prepare a Haitian woman for surgery at the Milot hospital in cap-Haitian, Haiti operated by the Crudem Foundation.

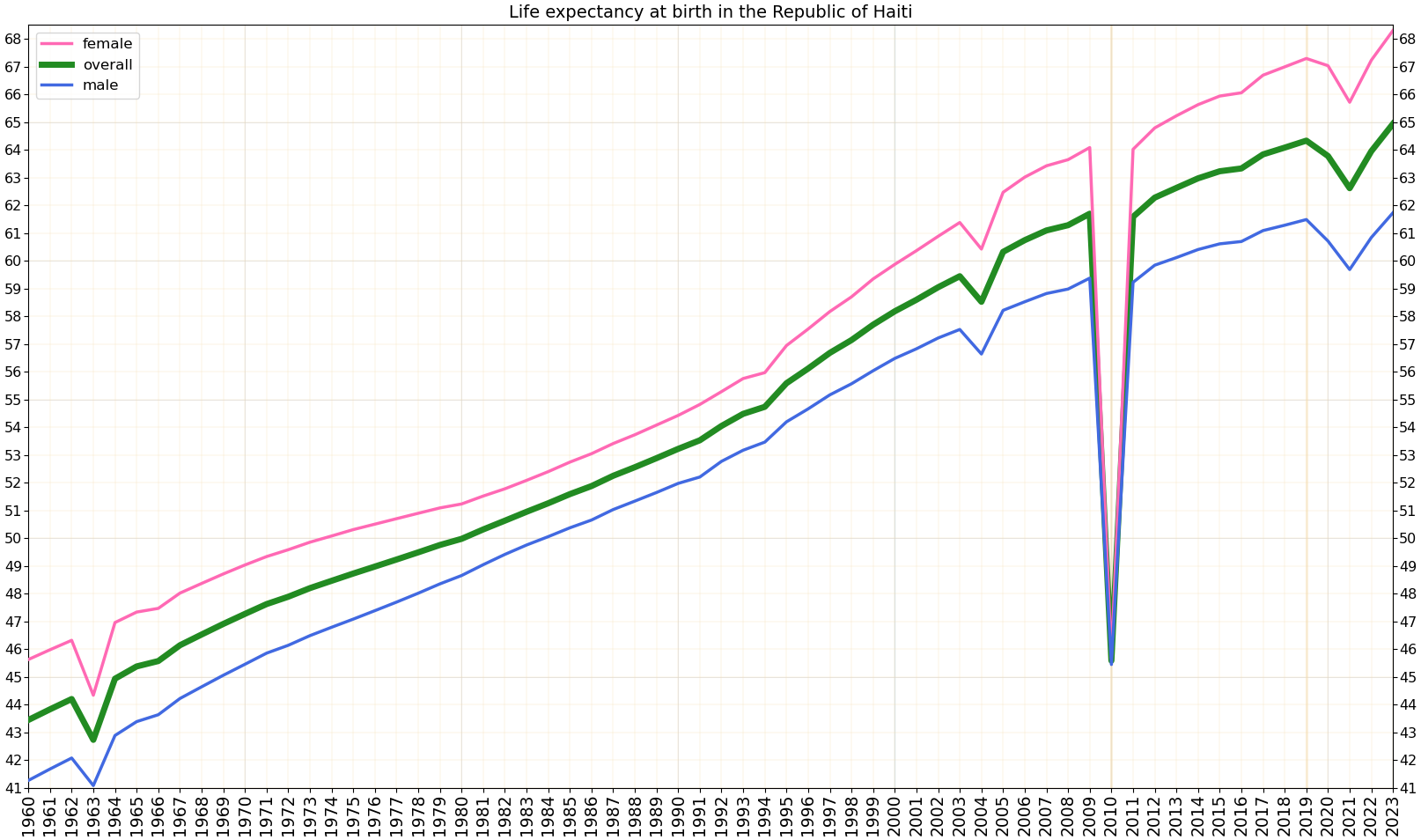
Life expectancy in Haiti

Deficient sanitation systems, poor nutrition, and inadequate health services have pushed Haiti to the bottom of the World Bank's rankings of health indicators. The World Bank reports that Haiti's infant and maternal mortality rates remain among the highest in the region, with declining preventive care coverage, particularly affecting the poorest households. Also, according to the United Nations World Food Programme, 80 percent of Haiti's population lives below the poverty line. In fact, 75% of the Haitian population lives off of $2.50 per day. Consequently, malnutrition is a significant problem. Half the population can be categorized as "food insecure," and nearly one in four children in Haiti suffer from chronic malnutrition, known as stunting, which has long-lasting physical consequences. According to the Global Nutrition Report, 21.9% of Haitian children under five years old are affected by stunting, indicating chronic malnutrition. Less than half the population has access to clean drinking water, a rate that compares poorly even with other less-developed nations. Haiti's healthy life expectancy at birth is 63 years. The World Health Organization (WHO) estimates that only 43 percent of the target population receives the recommended immunizations. This article will examine Haiti's healthcare infrastructure, prevalent public health challenges, and international initiatives aimed at enhancing health outcomes in the nation.

In 2013, there were approximately 800 primary care facilities in Haiti, with only 43% of these facilities being classified as good for accessible care. Only 8% of people living in rural areas have access to one of these facilities.

In terms of health care spending, Haiti ranks last in the western hemisphere. Economic instability has limited any growth in this area. Per capita, Haiti spends about US$83 annually on health care. There are 25 physicians and 11 nurses per 100,000 population. Only one-fourth of births are attended by a skilled health professional. Most rural areas have no access to health care, making residents susceptible to otherwise treatable diseases. In 2003, for example, the WHO confirmed an outbreak of typhoid fever in Haiti that, because of a lack of access to doctors and safe water, led to dozens of deaths.

Haiti has the highest incidence of human immunodeficiency virus/acquired immune deficiency syndrome (HIV/AIDS) outside of Africa. Sex tourism and lack of health education led to the beginning of the epidemic in the early 1980s. Estimates vary, but the United Nations projects the national prevalence rate to be 1.5 percent of the population. Other estimates place the rate as high as 5 percent in the urban population and 3 percent in rural regions. Annually, 5,000 Haitian babies are born infected with the AIDS virus. The disease causes a fifth of all infant deaths and has orphaned 200,000 children. Haiti also continues to face challenges with communicable diseases, including vector-borne illnesses such as dengue and malaria.

The Human Rights Measurement Initiative finds that Haiti is fulfilling 72.9% of what it should be fulfilling for the right to health based on its level of income. When looking at the right to health with respect to children, Haiti achieves 87.0% of what is expected based on its current income. In regards to the right to health amongst the adult population, the country achieves only 83.2% of what is expected based on the nation's level of income. Haiti falls into the "very bad" category when evaluating the right to reproductive health because the nation is fulfilling only 48.3% of what the nation is expected to achieve based on the resources (income) it has available.

=== Retail ===
Haiti's retail landscape features a dual economy, strictly divided between a formal sector serving the wealthy elite and a vast informal open-air market network relied upon by the majority of the population. While local and imported goods are distributed across five major regional hubs, widespread socioeconomic challenges and recent gang-related logistical hurdles heavily dictate commerce operations.

A unique institution in Haiti is the Madan Saras who are the large number of women who buy and transport agriculture produce from farm to market. Women in Haiti have traditionally been the marketers of produce while men cultivate the land.

=== Telecommunications ===
International television companies have earned subscriber bases in the tens of thousands, and Canal+ sees significant room to develop the pay TV industry in Haiti, having earned over 100,000 subscribers in the country as of 2021.

=== Tourism ===
Tourism in Haiti has suffered from the country's political upheaval. Inadequate infrastructure also has limited visitors to the island. In the 1970s and 1980s, however, tourism was an important industry, drawing an average of 150,000 visitors annually. Since the 1991 coup, tourism has recovered slowly. The Caribbean Tourism Organization (CTO) has joined the Haitian government in an effort to restore the island's image as a tourist destination. In 2001, 141,000 foreigners visited Haiti. Most came from the United States. To make tourism a major industry for Haiti, further improvements in hotels, restaurants and other infrastructure still are needed.

=== Transport ===
All of the major transportation systems in Haiti are located near or run through the capital, Port-au-Prince.

=== Water supply and sanitation ===
Haiti faces key challenges in the water supply and sanitation sector: Notably, access to public services is very low, their quality is inadequate and public institutions remain very weak despite foreign aid and the government's declared intent to strengthen the sector's institutions. Foreign and Haitian NGOs play an important role in the sector, especially in rural and urban slum areas.

== Macroeconomic statistics ==
Exports of Haiti by product category (2019) Chemical products Transportation Machines Mineral products Plastics and rubbers Metals Foodstuffs Precious metals Textiles Instruments Animal products Vegetable products Paper goods Footwear and headwear Miscellaneous Stone and glass Wood products Animal and vegetable bi-products Animal hides Arts and antiques Weapons

The following table shows the main economic indicators in 1980–2024. Inflation below 5% is in green.

Year	GDP (in bil. US$ PPP)	GDP per capita (in US$ PPP)	GDP (in bil. US$ nominal)	GDP growth (real)	Inflation (consumer prices)	Government debt (Percentage of GDP)
1980	10.2	1,715	2.7	▲7.3%	▲19.1%	n/a
1985	▲12.9	▲1,978	▲4.0	▲0.8%	▲10.6%	n/a
1990	▲14.8	▲2,089	▼1.7	▼−0.4%	▲21.3%	n/a
1995	▲15.3	▼1,953	▲4.8	▲9.9%	▲30.2%	n/a
2000	▲18.8	▲2,195	▲6.8	▲0.9%	▲6.4%	▲32%
2005	▲22.4	▲2,409	▲7.2	▲3.1%	▲14.1%	▼30%
2006	▲23.5	▲2,486	▲7.5	▲1.8%	▲13.0%	▲32%
2007	▲25.3	▲2,630	▲9.5	▲4.7%	▲6.9%	▼24%
2008	▲26.4	▲2,707	▲10.5	▲2.7%	▲12.5%	▲34%
2009	▲28.2	▲2,837	▲11.6	▲5.9%	▲5.6%	▼19%
2010	▼26.9	▼2,666	▲11.9	▼−5.7%	▲2.9%	▲25%
2011	▲28.8	▲2,814	▲13.0	▲5.1%	▲5.2%	▼22%
2012	▲29.5	▲2,835	▲13.7	▲0.5%	▲5.7%	▲24%
2013	▲31.3	▲2,961	▲14.9	▲4.3%	▲5.3%	▲25%
2014	▲32.4	▲3,017	▲15.1	▲1.7%	▲3.2%	▼21%
2015	▲33.6	▲3,075	▼14.8	▲2.6%	▲5.3%	▲24%
2016	▲34.5	▲3,113	▼14.0	▲1.8%	▲11.4%	24%
2017	▲36.0	▲3,200	▲15.0	▲2.5%	▲10.6%	▼23%
2018	▼35.2	▼3,081	▲16.5	▲1.7%	▲11.4%	▲24%
2019	▲35.4	▼3,057	▼14.8	▼−1.7%	▲17.3%	▲27%
2020	▼34.9	▼2,971	▼14.5	▼−3.3%	▲22.9%	▼22%
2021	▲35.8	▲3,005	▲21.0	▼−1.8%	▲15.9%	▲29%
2022	▲37.7	▲3,123	▼19.8	▼−1.7%	▲27.6%	▲30%
2023	▲38.3	▲3,133	▼19.6	▼−1.9%	▲44.1%	▼28%
2024	▼37.7	▼3,039	▲26.3	▼−4.0%	▲26.0%	▼14%

== See also ==
- List of Haitian companies
- Corruption in Haiti
- Crime in Haiti
- Illegal drug trade in Haiti
- Prostitution in Haiti
- Ministry of Commerce and Industry (Haiti)
- Ministry of Economy and Finance (Haiti)
- Haiti and the World Bank
- Haitian independence debt
- Restavek
- Squatting in Haiti
- Economy of the Caribbean
- List of Latin American and Caribbean countries by GDP (nominal)
- List of Latin American and Caribbean countries by GDP (PPP)

== External links and further reading ==
- 'Haiti’s Grim History of Being "Open for Business"'
- "CHRONOLOGIE DU SECTEUR MINIER HAITIEN (de 1492 à 2000")
  - Google translation of "CHRONOLOGY OF MINING HAITIAN (From 1492 to 2000)"
