= BGO (conglomerate) =

Haitian diversified conglomerate

BGO S.A.
- Type: Private
- Industry: Conglomerate
- Founded: 1972; 54 years ago
- Founder: Gilbert Bigio
- Headquarters: Port-au-Prince, Haiti
- Area served: Worldwide
- Key people: Reuven Bigio (CEO)
- Products: Agriculture; Construction; Consumer goods; Energy; Financial; Infrastructure; Logistics; Media; Trading
- Subsidiaries: Aciérie d'Haïti; GB Energy (haitian company); GB Energy; Huileries Haïtiennes; Immocaraïbes; Citadelle United; Lafito Global; Republic (company); Republic; Southern Steel (company); Southern Steel[Telecom Solutions
- Website: bgocorp.com

BGO S.A., (stylized B|G|O; "Builders of Great Opportunities"), formerly GB Group S.A., is a diversified conglomerate based in Port-au-Prince, Haiti. It is a parent company of over a dozen industrial and trading companies with operations concentrated in Haiti, Dominican Republic, Jamaica, Saint Maarten and offices in the United States collaborating with more than 4,000 employees and in more than 15 countries companywide in business organizations.

== History ==
In 1972, founder Gilbert Bigio was part of a group of investors who inaugurates Aciérie d'Haïti (Haiti Steelworks), the first steel plant in the country. In the 1980s, Gilbert Bigio became the majority shareholder and the plant has a virtual monopoly on steel in the Haitian market. In 1981, the group founded Huileries Haïtiennes, a refining plant of edible oil.

In 2016, GB Group deployed Tideworks' terminal operating system (TOS) at its Port-au-Prince industrial zone facility.

== Subsidiaries ==
GB Group activities are diversified and spread in several areas, but are based on four known among other sectors:

=== Construction ===
- Aciérie d'Haïti – Steel Distributor and wood. Once seen as the largest Haitian private company, it remains today the largest company in construction materials.
- Immocaraïbes – Property developer specializing in Caribbean architecture.

=== Consumer goods ===
- Huileries Haïtiennes (HUHSA) – Consumer goods. Edible oil refining plant in the beginning, is now Huhsa also a manufacturer of soap to detergent, from margarine and exclusive distributor for Haiti several international companies; become the largest supplier of consumer goods.

=== Energy ===
- GB Energy – Operating a network of over 200 gas stations in the Caribbean as the license holder for the Dominican Republic, Jamaica and Sint Maarten/St. Martin.

In January 2016, GB Group sold to Groupe financier national its 50% stake of Distributeurs nationaux, S.A. (DINASA), the only integrated oil and gas Company in Haiti. DINASA wholesales and provides provides commercial and industrial clients with aviation fuel, LPG, diesel, fuels, bitumen, fuel oil and lubricants services along with its sister company Sodigaz, a propane dispenser.

=== Telecommunications ===
- Telecom Solutions – Distributor of mobile phones and prepaid cards for Digicel in Haiti. Joint venture with the Facey Commodity Company (Jamaica-based). GB Group is also a founding partner of Unigestion Holding, parent company of Digicel Haiti.
