= Gilbert Bigio =

Haitian businessman (1935–2026)

- Born: 10 June 1935; Port-au-Prince, Haiti
- Died: 29 September 2026 (aged 91); Florida, U.S.
- Occupation: Founder of GB Group
- Known for: Haitian billionaire
- Spouse: Monique Bigio

Gilbert Bigio (10 June 1935 – 29 September 2026) was a Haitian businessman. He was the founder of GB Group and Haiti's first billionaire. Bigio was sanctioned by the Government of Canada for his involvement in arms trafficking and human rights violations in Haiti. He was also the de facto leader of Haiti's Jewish community and an honorary Israeli consul.

Bigio's name appeared in the 2021 Pandora Papers leak of secret offshore company documents by the ICIJ. In an accounting document from the estate of Jeffrey Epstein, Bigio was revealed as the buyer of Epstein's Mercedes Maybach at a price of $132,000. Other leaked documents showed Bigio moving wealth to Miami and Switzerland through offshore companies in different tax havens.

== Early years ==
Bigio was born in Port-au-Prince on 10 June 1935. He was from a Sephardic Jewish family from Aleppo in the Ottoman Empire (now Syria), whose family immigrated to Haiti in 1896. The family has also been involved in other commercial activities all throughout the country. The Bigio family has remained in Haiti, prominent in business affairs for three generations. Bigio was not religious, but did own the only Sefer Torah in Haiti and culturally participated in Jewish holidays and events. According to Bigio, he never experienced antisemitism in Haiti.

== Career ==
In 1972, Bigio founded GB Group starting with Aciérie d’Haïti (Haiti Steelworks). In the 1980s, the company controlled almost all the commercial steel within Haiti. Bigio continued to grow the company's reach, expanding into consumer goods, energy and fuel, telecommunications, real estate, banking, and logistics.

Bigio served as Honorary Israeli Consul and, later, so did his son, Reuven.

== Canadian Government sanctions against Bigio ==
On 2 December 2022 the Government of Canada imposed sanctions against Bigio. The sanctions against Bigio were a response to his alleged participation in "gross and systematic human rights violations in Haiti and engaged in acts that threaten the peace, security, and stability of Haiti." The Canadian sanctions against Bigio were intended to stop the flow of illicit funds and weapons to armed criminal gangs in Haiti.

Specifically, Bigio was accused of supporting "illegal activities of armed criminal gangs, including through money laundering and other acts of corruption", according to a statement from the Canadian Minister of Foreign Affairs.

== Personal life and death ==
Bigio was married to Monique, who had converted to Judaism. They had three children; two daughters and a son. Bigio died in Florida on 29 September 2026, at the age of 91.
