= Haiti economic reforms of 1996 =

Haiti economic reforms of 1996 were a series of macroeconomic and structural reforms aimed at rebuilding the Economy of Haiti after years of decline. The centerpiece was the Emergency Economic Recovery Plan (EERP), which was later complemented by budget and fiscal reforms.

== Background ==
=== Economic situation ===
Following the 1991 coup d'état that removed the democratically elected president Jean-Bertrand Aristide from power, Haiti suffered internal instability and was placed under an international embargo. The embargo, combined with the economic and financial policies of the newly installed authorities, had devastating effects on the Economy of Haiti. It is estimated that between 1991 and 1994, GDP declined by more than one-third, inflation rose to roughly 50%, and unemployment exceeded 80%. Deforestation and land overuse also intensified during this period. As a result of these continuing economic problems, Haiti remained the poorest country in the Western Hemisphere.

In 1994, U.S. troops restored President Aristide to power. The following year, he was peacefully succeeded by René Préval, and U.S. forces were gradually replaced by the United Nations Mission in Haiti. During this period, Haiti briefly regained the attention of the international community, prompting significant interest in supporting the country’s reconstruction efforts.

=== EERP ===
Following the lifting of the embargo and the reestablishment of democratic rule, the government of Haiti (through the Ministry of Economy and Finance (MEF)) initiated the Emergency Economic Recovery Plan (EERP). The EERP was developed by the MEF in cooperation with the World Bank, the Inter-American Development Bank (IDB), the United States Agency for International Development (USAID), the United Nations Development Programme (UNDP), and the Organization of American States (OAS). The plan aimed at rapid macroeconomic stabilization and the attraction of private foreign investment.

EERP reforms included rebuilding public administration, advancing privatization of state-owned enterprises, promoting private business development, investing in agriculture, improving municipal, transport, sanitation, health, and education infrastructure, and addressing environmental concerns through reforestation and soil conservation.

The EERP, widely viewed as neoliberal, was criticized for giving insufficient attention to Haiti’s dominant agricultural sector, which employs roughly 65% of the population. Less than 1% of total funds were allocated directly to farmers, although additional resources supported related areas such as roads and irrigation systems. Other criticisms focused on unpopular reforms such as privatization, wage freezes, and reductions in tariffs. While lower agricultural tariffs reduced food prices, they also exposed local farmers to intense international competition, which many were unable to withstand.

After implementation of the EERP, Haitian real GDP grew by 4.5 percent in the fiscal year 1994–95, inflation declined, and the gourde stabilized on international markets. Despite these signs of recovery, Haiti faced a growing budget deficit. The external current account deficit reached 19 percent of GDP, fueled by renewed capital inflows and foreign aid.

== 1996 reforms ==
In October 1996, the International Monetary Fund (IMF) approved a three-year credit for Haiti of SDR 91.1 million (approximately US$131 million in 1996) to support Haiti's economic reform program for 1996–1999. The planned reforms included increasing taxes and modernizing fiscal practices. The IMF emphasized that spending in social sectors aimed at addressing poverty should increase, supported by foreign aid from humanitarian organizations and external aid agencies.

Reforms undertaken by the Haitian Ministry of Economy and Finance were severely delayed by political instability, including the resignation of the government in June 1997 (see Haitian general election, 1997) and the suspension of all "new business" by Parliament. Some reforms, such as privatization, proved politically unpopular, and delays in implementation led to freezes in promised international assistance.

Implementation of budget reforms also faced multiple challenges. According to C. Bernard Myers, these included:

- Frequent delays in enacting the annual budget
- Key components missing from the budget
- The budget not reflecting the needs and resources of the government
- Focus on inputs with little accountability for results
- Inefficiency in the expenditure process and financial controls
