= Tele Quisqueya =

Saint-Marc; Haiti
- Channels: Analog: 15 (UHF)

Tele Quisqueya (TQ) is a television station located in Saint-Marc, Haiti. Broadcasting on channel 15 UHF and channel 9 VHF, it covers all of Artibonite and other departments in the country. As a commercial station it offers a dynamic program with rich content.

The station also operates an FM radio station ("amazone") on 99.1 FM.
