= Radio Scoop FM =

Port-au-Prince, Haiti; Haiti
- Frequency: 107.7 MHz

Programming
- Language: French

Links
- Website: scoopfmhaiti.com

Scoop FM is a Haitian radio station based out of Port-au-Prince, Haiti that provides sports news, cultural content, business news, and election and political news in French.
