= Haiti and the World Bank =

The World Bank Group country partnership framework aims to support Haiti's efforts to reduce poverty and provide economic opportunities for all Haitians. The framework aims to strengthen institutions, government capacity, and public financial management as aid and concessional financing rapidly decline.

== Background ==
In September 1953, Haiti became a nation member of the International Bank for Reconstruction and Development (IBRD), the first of five member institutions of the World Bank Group. Despite its urgent need for humanitarian aid as the poorest country in the Western hemisphere, Haiti's political instability under a series of dictatorial regimes limited its access to international aid and development programs. Due to poor governance, the country was considered a risky recipient of foreign assistance. This resulted in little improvement and the country remained dysfunctional and impoverished despite billions in foreign aid over decades.

=== Debt relief and funds ===
The World Bank Group’s involvement in Haiti has focused on reconstruction and development. The country has suffered deterioration from Western slavery and imperialism, ceaseless civil unrest, decades of extreme poverty, and devastation from a series of natural disasters. Following its satisfaction for the requirements of domestic, economic, and social reforms, Haiti was granted a total of US $1.2 billion in 2009 by reaching the finishing point under the Heavily Indebted Poor Country (HIPC) debt relief initiative approved by the Boards of the International Development Association (IDA) and the International Monetary Fund (IMF). In response to the catastrophic earthquake in Haiti in January 2010, the IDA waived the country's remaining US $36 million debt in May, and the World Bank made US $479 million available for Haiti's recovery from the earthquake and development through June 2016.

== Country Partnership Framework and projects ==
In September 2015, the World Bank Board of Executive Directors endorsed the New Country Partnership Strategy in Haiti. The Country Partnership Framework is collectively set by the Haitian Government and branches of the World Bank Group including the International Development Association (IDA), International Bank for Reconstruction and Development (IBRD), the International Finance Corporation (IFC) and the Multilateral Investment Guarantee Agency (MIGA). The World Bank in Haiti focuses on projects to increase government capacity by enhancing energy accessibility and developing a renewable energy infrastructure that facilitates the country's economic opportunity, strengthening human capital through improvement in education, welfare and health services, and improving climate resilience and disaster response capacity. As of April 2017, the World Bank’s portfolio in Haiti comprised 13 ongoing projects with a net commitment of US $637.8 million.

=== Recent projects ===
The International Finance Corporation (IFC) has focused on Haiti’s flagship private sector projects. The IFC committed a portfolio of US $122 million in Haiti through the Country Partnership Framework in 2015. Sylvain Kakou, the IFC Country Head in Haiti, said the IFC has become the largest provider of foreign direct investment in Haiti for the private sector to foster economic growth. This support facilitated the resumption of business after the earthquake and provided packages of loans for private sector clients including the independent power producer, two banks, a micro-credit institution, mining exploration, a hotel, and an industrial park. The IFC has supported many of Haiti’s private sector projects with its portfolio of investments amounting to the US $32.7 million in 7 transactions.

=== Significant projects ===
==== Strengthening primary health care and surveillance in Haiti ====
The project is projected to aid in providing basic healthcare services to 3 million people. It aims to increase the ability for the government to monitor health risks and the immunization process, as well as better the relationship between the Haitian government and international organizations within the health sector. This is an active project with the project end date being December 31, 2024. Currently, the results of this project are: 45.3% of children aged 12 to 23 months in project intervention areas are fully vaccinated, 45% of suspected cases of cholera are given notifications within 10 days, 72% and 77% of suspected cases of diphtheria and measles, respectively, were investigated and reported within 48 hours. The project is being led by Andrew Sunil Rajkumar and the total project cost being $70 million with $50 million being the commitment amount.

==== Providing an education of quality in Haiti ====
The goal of this project is to increase enrollment in public and private primary schools, create a better learning environment by improving the condition of schools, and close the gender gap in education. The focus of this project is regional with the selected area being the Southern departments. This active project is headed by Yves Jantzem and Elena Maria Roseo. The total project cost is $57 million and the commitment amount is $39 million.

==== Strengthening disaster risk management and climate resilience ====
The project objective is to create enhanced infrastructure to support efficient disaster risk management by implementing a national early warning system, better emergency response, and improve the evacuation process in high-risk areas. It will also implement the development of schools and community centers to be used as emergency shelters, create improved building codes, and give training. The project is active and is headed by Claudia Ruth Soto Orozco and Roland Alexander Bradshaw. The total project cost is $35 million and the commitment amount is $35 million as well. This project was approved on May 16, 2019, and the end date is April 30, 2025.

=== Active projects ===
Project Name	Commitment Amount	Approval Date	Ref
HT - AF to Providing an Education of Quality in Haiti	$39 million	May 16, 2019	
Strengthening DRM and Climate Resilience Project	$35 million	May 16, 2019	
Strengthening Primary Health Care and Surveillance in Haiti	$55 million	May 16, 2019	
Improving Access to Social Services & Employment Opportunities for PWD	$2.29 million	May 7, 2019	
Haiti Fiscal and Social Resilience Development Policy Financing	$20 million	September 20, 2018	
Haiti Rural Accessibility & Resilience Project	$75 million	May 31, 2018	
Additional Financing to Haiti Statistical Capacity Building Project	$15 million	May 31, 2018	
Resilient Productive Landscapes in Haiti	$15 million	March 1, 2018	
Resilient Productive Landscapes in Haiti	0.00	March 1, 2018	
Haiti Modern Energy Service For All	$15.65 million	October 25, 2017	
Haiti: Renewable Energy for All	$19.62 million	October 25, 2017	
Municipal Development and Urban Resilience Project	$48.40 million	June 20, 2017	
Relaunching Agriculture: Strengthening Agriculture Public Services II Project - Additional financing	$35 million	June 14, 2017	
Sustainable Rural and Small Town Water Supply and Sanitation Additional Financing	$20 million	June 14, 2017	
Additional Financing for the Improving Maternal and Child Health Through Integrated Social Services Project	$25 million	June 14, 2017	
Disaster Risk Management and Reconstruction Additional Financing	$20 million	June 8, 2017	
Haiti Statistical Capacity Building in Education Grant	$0.50 million	June 2, 2017	
Statistical Capacity Building Project	$5 million	March 24, 2017	
Providing an Education of Quality in Haiti (PEQH)	$30 million	November 10, 2016	
Second Additional Financing Infra & Instit Emergency Recovery	$2.80 million	November 10, 2016	
HT Strengthening Hydro-Met Services	$5 million	June 26, 2015	
HT Sustainable Rural and Small Towns Water and Sanitation Project	$50 million	May 26, 2015	
AF for Haiti Education for All Project Phase II	0.00	June 25, 2014	
HT Center and Artibonite Regional Development	$50 million	May 19, 2014	
Cultural Heritage Preservation and Tourism Sector Support Project	$45 million	May 19, 2014	
AF GPE to Haiti Education for All Project - Phase II	0.00	June 29, 2013	
Improving Maternal and Child Health through Integrated Social Services	$70 million	May 21, 2013	
Haiti Business Development and Investment Project	$20 million	May 21, 2013	
AF Infrastructure & Institutions Emergency Recovery	$35 million	September 27, 2012	
Rebuilding Energy Infrastructure and Access	$90 million	September 27, 2012	
Disaster Risk Management and Reconstruction	$60 million	December 1, 2011	
Relaunching Agriculture: Strengthening Agriculture Public Services II Project (GAFSP - IDA)	$40 million	December 1, 2011	

== Current strategy ==
The World Bank curates objectives tailored to member country's needs. The World Bank's priorities in Haiti are listed as follows. Growing the economy outside of Port-au-Prince by revitalizing energy sources, increasing the activity in the private sector, and increasing access to funds. Increase human capital through promotion of primary education, maternal and child healthcare. Aiding communities affected by the cholera outbreak by providing water and sanitation in these areas. Rebuilding stronger infrastructure to decrease the disaster risk by floods and other natural disasters as well as having greater emergency preparedness. Improve the government’s capacity for data and creating effective policy around that data, while also providing a system of transparency.

== Controversy ==
=== Mining ===
The World Bank has been criticized because of their assistance in drafting a revision to a mining bill that would expand the mining sector and increase the potential of foreign companies interest in Haiti, by bypassing the current bureaucratic system and parliamentary oversight altogether. This initial act in 2013 was met with multiple Haitian groups filing an appeal through the World Bank's office of complaints, due to the lack of public input in the matter, a requirement of the World Bank. The case was rejected by the Inspection Panel due to the technical assistance coming from Bank-executed trust fund, meaning the social and environmental safeguards did not need to be followed. Amid the Haitian government dissolving in 2015 concerns arose again regarding the fate of this revision and its possible impact on the environment and local communities. The draft bill is considered by activists to have the potential to further political turmoil as elections were underway to select a new president and parliament and this issue could be pushed depending on the political leaning.

The team was led by Raju Jan Singh (Program Leader, LCC8C). The work was carried out jointly with the IFC (Sylvain Kakou) and MIGA (Petal Hacket) under the overall guidance of Mary Barton-Dock (Special Envoy for Haiti, LCC8C) and Jun Zhang (Senior Regional Manager for the Caribbean, IFC).
