= Sûrtab =

Haitian consumer electronics selling technology company

Sûrtab S.A.
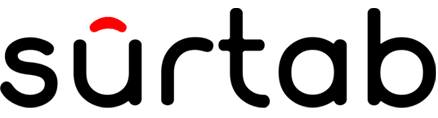
- Type: Private
- Industry: Computer hardware; Consumer electronics
- Founded: 2013
- Founders: Maarten Boute (CEO); Richard Coles; J. P. Folsgaard Bak; Ulla Bak
- Headquarters: Port-au-Prince, Haiti
- Products: Sûrtab7 3GHD; Sûrtab7 3G; Sûrtab7 WIFI
- Website: surtab.com

Sûrtab S.A. is a Haitian technology company headquartered in Port-au-Prince, Haiti, that designs, develops, and sells computer hardware and consumer electronics, most notably, tablet computers.

== Etymology ==
The name Sûrtab, is derived from a contraction between the French word, "sûr", which is used to designate things that are emphatic, certain, and true, that can not be questioned, must happen infallibly, and are reliable; with the English word "tablet".

== See also ==
- Comparison of tablet computers
