= Squatting in Haiti =

Haiti on globe

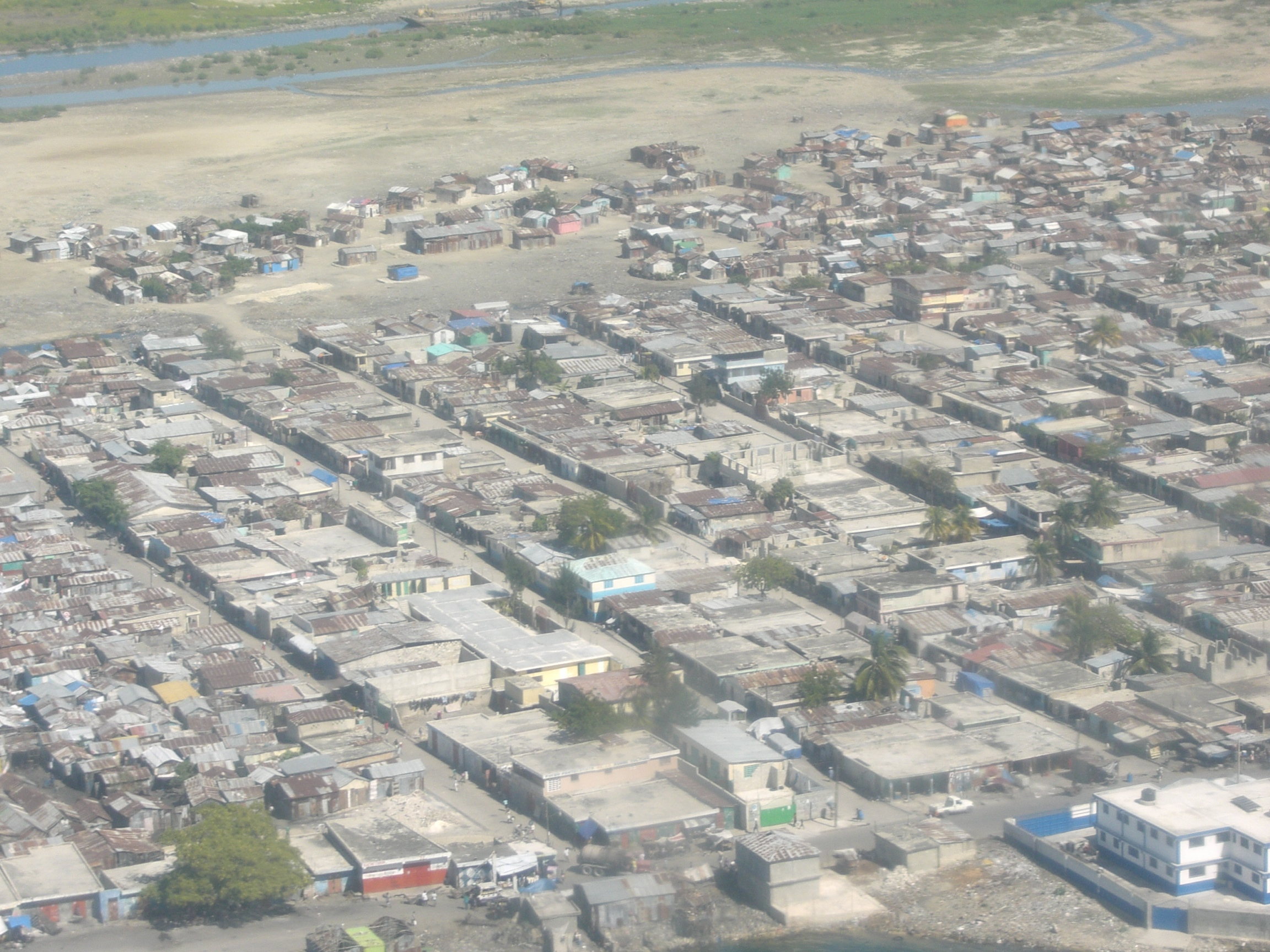
Cité Soleil in 2006

Squatting in Haiti is the occupation of unused land or abandoned buildings without the permission of the owner. Following the Haitian Revolution (1791–1804), squatters acquired smallholdings across the country. As the capital Port-au-Prince grew, so did the informal settlements ringing it. In the Bel Air district, there is some squatting whilst most people pay rent, building their own homes. In 2004, President Jean-Bertrand Aristide was deposed in a coup and poor areas such as Bel Air and Cité Soleil erupted in violence. Peacekeepers from the United Nations Stabilisation Mission in Haiti later evicted ex-combatants squatting in the house of Aristide.

Cité Soleil was founded in 1958 to house workers, then grew rapidly to 80,000 people in the 1980s and 400,000 people in the 1990s. It became the largest slum in Haiti, housing people displaced from other areas. There is little infrastructure and the area frequently becomes flooded. The World Health Organization said in 2000 that 51 per cent of rural homes in the country had clean drinking water and 21 per cent had sanitation. Squatters can acquire title by adverse possession after twenty years of open occupation.

Following the 2010 Haiti earthquake, 1.5 million people were displaced and efforts to help them were hampered by the devastation of the land registry. Under 5 per cent of the nation's land had been officially assessed, making it difficult to settle claims for title. The Organization of American States had already pledged $70 million to set up a digital land registry. In some cases, cooperative groups helped squatters to buy the buildings they occupied. One year later, 100,000 squatters had left the aid camps and were occupying land next to an official camp called Corail.
