= Fonkoze =

Haitian microfinance institution

- Founded: 1994
- Founder: Fr. Joseph Phillipe and Anne H. Hastings
- Type: Domestic: 501(c)(3), Haitian Non-profit, Haitian Bank
- Purpose: Poverty
- Location(s): Port-au-Prince, Haiti; Washington, D.C., USA
- Region served: Haiti
- Method: Microfinance
- Revenue: $2,784,685 (2016)
- Expenses: $2,841,131 (2016)
- Website: www.fonkoze.org

Fonkoze is Haiti's largest microfinance institution serving the poor (primarily rural women) in Haiti, with 44 branches located throughout the country. The name Fonkoze is an acronym for the Haitian Creole phrase "Fondasyon Kole Zepòl" meaning "Shoulder-to-Shoulder Foundation." Its Goal is to aid Haitians with financial and development services to lift themselves out of poverty. Fonkoze's development programs include Adult Education, Ultra-Poverty Alleviation and Boutik Sante, a health program designed to create a new business opportunity for Fonkoze's existing clients while also providing much-needed health products, services and education to rural communities throughout the country. Fonkoze is a family of three organisations working together to achieve its mission:

1. Fonkoze Foundation: a Haitian non-profit which provides development services such as health education, literacy and business skills training to Fonkoze's microfinance clients and to ultra-poor families.
2. Fonkoze Financial Services: a Haitian microfinance company with a double bottom line: to lift families and communities out of poverty while operating in a financially self‐sustaining manner.
3. Fonkoze USA, a 501(c)(3) non-profit which provides technical, communications and fundraising support in the US for its Haitian partners.

== The Founding ==
Nearly three decades ago, Haiti was a country in the midst of a struggle for freedom and equality. Its first democratically elected president was living in exile, and the country was ruled by a brutal military regime. The organised rural and urban poor — the hundreds of grassroots organisations that worked tirelessly in the late eighties and early nineties for democracy in Haiti — were especially the targets of repression. Thousands were killed during this time, and many more were living in hiding or constant fear of reprisal. This is the context of the founding of Fonkoze.

A group of leaders — led by Father Joseph Philippe, a Spiritan Priest and founder of the Peasant Association of Fondwa — envisioned a Haiti where individuals were not only given a chance at political democracy, but at economic democracy as well. They had confidence their president, Jean Bertrand Aristide, would soon be restored to power and the military regime would depart. Fr. Philippe recognized that the strong grassroots movement organized to bring about historic political change, could also be harnessed to bring about economic change on behalf of Haiti's poor.

His main concern was that, although the majority of poor people in Haiti now knew how to organize themselves politically, they knew nothing about how to organize themselves economically. Even though people might control who was president, they had no control over who ruled the economy. The poor were not allowed access to banks or to the financial services they needed to rebuild their lives and their country from the ground up.

If you were a poor peasant or “ti machann,” (woman street vendor), who had no collateral, small banking transaction sizes, and could not read or write, you were not welcome in commercial banks. A coffee cooperative, for example, could not get enough credit to buy and process coffee harvests for export and a ti machann could not get a small loan to restock her merchandise and increase the size of her business. The poor who had organised themselves to gain political power now needed to organize themselves to create a bank they could call their own.

In 1994, the founders of Fonkoze — some 32 grassroots leaders — drew up the official papers to launch their efforts, and in 1995 Fonkoze (Fondasyon Kole Zepòl, or the Shoulder-to-Shoulder Foundation) was officially recognised as a foundation under Haitian law.

== The Creation of Fonkoze USA ==
In the spring of 1996, Fonkoze organized a conference in Miami to bring together micro-credit practitioners, Haitian-Americans, and Haiti advocates to discuss how Fonkoze should be launched. The meeting was held at and in attendance were representatives of many of the Haitian communities. One of the main topics of discussion at the conference was how to finance the work of Fonkoze. Some had argued that Fonkoze should finance its loans out of the savings people put on deposit with the Organisation — just like the banks do. But others argued that it would not be right to put poor people's savings at risk and that the demand for loans would inevitably be greater than the savings Fonkoze could mobilise.

Some of the guest speakers at the conference told participants about a similarly minded organisation providing micro-credit in that received funds for its loan portfolio through a partner organisation. The participants in the conference decided they could perhaps do the same, and Fonkoze was conceived.

In the fall of 1996, a board member of the Washington Office on Haiti — Leigh Carter — agreed to take the job as executive director of Fonkoze USA, and in January 1997 Fonkoze USA held its founding board meeting. Members of the Board included a few Haitians, but also Salvadorans, Mexicans, and African Americans. It included community organisers, lawyers, religious, professors, engineers, and bankers.

Fonkoze USA was established with the mission to raise donated and invested (loaned) funds, to increase public awareness in the U.S. about its partners' work in Haiti and to provide technical assistance to its partners. Fonkoze, it was agreed, would be the main recipient of the loans and grants raised through the efforts of Fonkoze. Arnold and Porter of New York became the first pro bono legal counsel of Fonkoze USA, and organizational structures were put in place.

Fonkoze USA developed its own Disclosure Statement, Notes for a Democratic Economy in Haiti. These Notes were “sold” to individuals and organizations all over the U.S. to finance Fonkoze's loan fund in Haiti. Essentially, any individual or organization could loan Fonkoze USA funds ($1,000 minimum) for the loan fund at 0-4% interest. Fonkoze USA then re-loaned these funds to Fonkoze, and Fonkoze re-loaned them to Haiti's ti machann using the solidarity group lending method. When the loan matured, an investor could opt to receive the full amount of his/her loan with interest, or to renew the loan for continued work in Haiti.

== Growing the New Institutions ==
In Haiti, Fonkoze was not exclusively focused on credit. Fr. Joseph was determined not only to offer a full range of banking services to the organized poor of Haiti, but also to attack the problems of illiteracy and the lack of business skills among the poor. Fonkoze was unwavering in its commitment to give the poor all the tools they needed and deserved to be successful at economic development.

Fonkoze believes that its success over the years is due to solidarity from its donors, partners, clients and employees. This is the basis of Fonkoze's success. Equipped with this solidarity and a drive to succeed, the Fonkoze Family undertook tremendous growth in the early years. The organizations strongly believed if they were truly to have an impact throughout the country, and especially in the countryside where the poorest and most vulnerable lived, they needed to quickly open a branch in each department of Haiti. Balanced against this need was the length of time it took Fonkoze to develop the networks needed to quickly raise funds, and to develop the legal structures to raise investments for the loan fund. Eventually, the two tracks began to coincide.

Once Fonkoze made its first offering of Notes for a Democratic Economy in Haiti in the winter of 1998, the loan fund began to grow rapidly. Leigh Carter was diagnosed with breast cancer, but continued to work during recovery. Fueled by a network of religious alternative investors and concerned individuals all over the U.S., the loan fund reached more than a half million dollars by 1998. Fonkoze opened 15 branch offices by the end of the same year. Donations from individuals and organizations to Fonkoze USA and directly to Fonkoze in Haiti began to appear. These funded the expenses not yet covered by Fonkoze's own financial activities, as well as its educational programs.

By 1998, Fonkoze had strong programs and activities consisting of:

- Solidarity group micro-credit loans to expand a business;
- Business development loans to small micro-entrepreneurs, or small and growing businesses;
- A money transfer service;
- Currency exchange services;
- A multi-faceted program of savings;
- Training programs abroad for employees; and
- Literacy and business skills training

At the end of 1998, Fonkoze had 645 member organizations, 5,134 savings accounts with total deposits of 9,878,735 gourds (almost US$600,000), 2,607 group borrowers with the total volume of outstanding loans at 7,038,578 gourds (about $US426,580). They had 15 branches, and 101 employees. In addition to important donors and investors, Fonkoze was fortunate to have dedicated partners in its early development, including Arnold & Porter, Fairfield University School of Business, Duquesne University, and City National Bank of New Jersey. In-kind technical assistance was key to assisting the staff of Fonkoze to attack the learning gap they were facing, and be able to offer professional, high-quality, financial services to the poor.

=== Resolving the Financing Dilemma ===
Professionalization and growth continued throughout 1998, 1999, and 2000. As Fonkoze faced the new millennium, however, it became evident a new path was necessary. The financing mechanism Fonkoze had been Utilizing—low-interest loans from abroad and donations—no longer seemed to be a viable long-term strategy for the simple reason that the gourds were no longer stable. Fonkoze was borrowing in dollars and lending in gourdes. When the gourde began to devalue rapidly beginning in the year 2000, it was clear that when it came time to repay the loans in dollars, the gourdes would no longer have the same value and there would be a shortfall in Fonkoze's ability to repay. Raising funds for the non-financial services was also a challenge.

While the organization had come a long way, it seemed Fonkoze's dream of sustainability (at least for its financial services work) was always just out of reach. There was simply not enough capital to reach the scale that would be necessary to make the institution profitable. With a network of 15 branches, Fonkoze's capacity clearly outstripped its capital base—and its capital base consisted of 100% debt. Another financing strategy would have to be devised.

Other foundations and microcredit institutions throughout the developing world dealt with the same dilemma as Fonkoze. Prodem in Bolivia, the Grameen Bank in Bangladesh, and CARD in the Philippines all made the transition to full-fledged microcredit commercial banks, yet had begun as foundations or not-for-profits in their respective countries. As Fonkoze began to study their model of development, they discovered that in each case, the organization was driven by the same challenges of sustainability, scale, and capital.

It was at this time that Gordon McCormick, a Fonkoze USA major donor and Wall Street investment banker, became an active part of the team to shape Fonkoze's future. He and Anne both believed that private capital could be accessed to tackle the problem of poverty in Haiti. Together, they set about to do just that by actively visualizing what it would take to create a solid financial base from which the institution could grow. One thing was evident — Fonkoze was having no trouble mobilizing savings in the communities in which it was operating. Every year, since 1996, the volume of savings had more than doubled. By the end of the year 2000 it stood at almost US$2 million. With a commercial bank license, Fonkoze would be able to access those deposits for lending. If they could add to that another $2-$3 million in capital from abroad, Fonkoze would have a stable base from which to reach scale.

In the early stages of this exploration, Gordon, Anne, and other members of the Board of Fonkoze USA, consulted with attorneys (both in the and ), donor institutions, and international microfinance consultants from Development Alternatives, Inc. Just as the organization was about to take its first steps at putting voice to their vision and presenting it to the larger community, violent forces within moved on Fonkoze.

== The Tragedy of Amos Jeannot ==
September 6, 2000, a group of 10 men dressed in official Haitian National Police uniforms came to the door of Fonkoze. Under the pretext of checking Fonkoze's gun permits, they entered the building. The men forced all the employees on the floor at gunpoint, and robbed the central safe of a relatively small amount of cash. Before leaving, they asked by name for long-time Fonkoze employee, Amos Jeannot, and forced him into the back of their stolen vehicle. As the car drove away, Fonkoze employees painfully witnessed the men brutally beating Amos.

Two days later, Fonkoze received a phone call. The caller said, “Tell Anne if she doesn’t close Fonkoze, we won’t let Amos go." It soon became evident that the attack was about more than money. It was about intimidating, or even destroying, the institution of Fonkoze. Even though the organization always kept a low profile, and quietly and neutrally went about its work, someone was not at all happy with Fonkoze's success. Fonkoze USA and Fonkoze Haiti immediately broke with their low-profile status, and began to “make a loud noise.”

In Haiti, Anne and Leigh posted reward flyers in neighborhoods throughout Port-au-Prince and went to radio stations to broadcast Amos’ kidnapping. In the U.S., Fonkoze organized an international campaign to pressure the Haitian government to fully investigate the attack and kidnapping. More than 1,000 faxes from all over the world were sent to the President of Haiti and the Chief of Police. In three popular Haitian newspapers, full-page ads ran calling for a full investigation, offering support and solidarity for Fonkoze, and signed by more than 100 international organizations. Sadly, three weeks later, the tortured body of Amos Jeannot was found in the Central Morgue by Fonkoze staff member Alexandre Hector.

Amos left behind a wife and four-month-old son. "The National Cathedral was filled to capacity with mourners at the memorial service as a banner flew in front proclaiming, “thank you Amos for all your good work in the country, with the peasants, with the youth, and with the ti machann.” While the investigation stalled, Fonkoze continued its work. When asked how Fonkoze staff could find the courage to do so, Anne replied, “Amos gave his life for Fonkoze, we have no choice but to keep moving forward.” With even more determination, and more solidarity from clients and supporters, Fonkoze did just that. It is said in the face of incredible challenges to their work — insecurity, devaluation of the Haitian gourde, continued political instability — Fonkoze grew, professionalized, and strengthened in Amos' memory".

== Becoming Known in the Microfinance Communities ==
By the end of 2000, Fonkoze had 972 member organizations, 13,260 savings accounts with total deposits of 38,646,349 gourdes (about US$1.7 million), 4,794 group borrowers with the total volume of outstanding loans at 21,135,636 gourdes (about US$1 million). Since 2010 they have 41 branches, more than 750 employees, 45,000 loan clients and 200,000 savers.

It was during this same period that Fonkoze began in earnest to learn from other microfinance institutions in Haiti and around the world and to become known within the larger microfinance community. In the fall of 1999, Fonkoze submitted its application to the United National Development Program (UNDP) to become a MicroStart grantee. In the summer of 2000, it was awarded that grant, signaling that it was one of 4 microfinance institutions in considered to have the potential of becoming a sustainable institution that could reach scale. The grant brought with it both financing and technical assistance provided by Freedom from Hunger.

At about the same time, Fonkoze entered into a partnership with Development Alternatives, Inc., a USAID-funded organization that provided technical assistance to microfinance institutions operating in Haiti. The Grameen Foundation became another of its technical assistance providers. In short, in the space of about 2 years, Fonkoze became very well known within the microfinance sector in and began to earn an international reputation for its provision of rural microfinance services. This culminated in Fonkoze's award in December 2003 of a CGAP Pro-Poor Innovation Award when it was one of five institutions selected out of an application pool of 300 for an award for its money transfer service.

Looking toward eventual “commercialization,” the organization set about putting its house in order with determination. The loan portfolio was brought to top performance. This took tremendous re-organization, and training for Fonkoze employees and clients. Key to this transition were a two-person team: Rob Barger, who was Director of Credit at the time, and Mr. Salam, a Grameen Bank senior manager who was loaned to Fonkoze for a period of ten months. The two of them re-organized all of Fonkoze's solidarity groups into Credit Centers. Centers consist of 6-10 solidarity groups of women who gather together all at once to network, receive credit and training, open saving accounts, and repay their loans. During that year, Fonkoze dramatically improved its microcredit portfolio quality and quantity. Arrears greater than one day were drastically reduced (from an average of 20% to an average of 2%). The portfolio at risk greater than 30 days also dropped to 2%. Waiting time between loans was reduced. Write-offs remained under 4% annually. Then, in the six-month period between June 2002 and December 2002, the portfolio grew by 50%.

Fonkoze also underwent a complete Information Technology overhaul. One of the biggest problems in managing Fonkoze had been the amount of time it took to get management information from the field, given Haiti's poor telecommunications and road infrastructure. With help from a number of its partners, including the Doen Foundation, the Raskob Foundation, and DAI/FINNET, Fonkoze purchased banking software that held the promise of vast improvements in its processing of information. In addition, it began linking its branches through a private virtual network. This was a huge improvement, as the organization moved from “banking by notebook,” to computerized systems.

The private offering for the “commercialization” of the institution was a success. A goal of $2 million in equity capital was set and raised in the United States and the Netherlands to successfully spin off the income-producing line items from Fonkoze (Fondasyon Kole Zepòl) to form Fonkoze Financial Services (Sèvis Finansye Fonkoze, S.A. or SFF). It became evident that the Central Bank of Haiti would never consider approval of Fonkoze's application for a commercial bank license, so Fonkoze Financial Services continued to operate as a non-bank, for-profit financial services institution with a social mission. The government of Haiti and the Central Bank started to consider what kind of license would be appropriate for micro-finance institutions like Fonkoze, and began to draft a law.

The movement called Fonkoze had developed into three separate institutions, with three separated Boards of Directors, three separate staffs, and one overall mission: to eliminate poverty in Haiti. The original, founding, organization, Fondasyon Kole Zepòl, Fonkoze Foundation, still managed small, incubating branches plus other development services. Fonkoze USA continued to raise donated and invested funds for Fonkoze Foundation. Fonkoze Financial Services was strictly providing financial services and access.

As Fonkoze Financial Services set out to work towards sustainability as a non-bank, financial institution, Fonkoze Foundation was expanding as well. Literacy and business skills training were augmented with education modules on reproductive health, women's and children's rights, and environmental protection. Social Performance Monitoring became a new focus and department. Struck by the growing problem of malnutrition in the rural sectors, Fonkoze Foundation began a program to detect malnutrition and distribute vitamins. But, most importantly, Fonkoze Foundation (first under Anne Hasting's leadership, and then under Carine Roenen's leadership) initiated a program for the “ultra poor,” called Chemen Lavi Miyò, or Pathway to a Better Life.

Chemen Lavi Miyò (CLM), empowered Haiti's poorest women to pull themselves and their families from ultra poverty into self-sufficiency, with hope and vision for their futures. Incoming CLM members lived on the very margins of rural society in some of the most extreme poverty in Haiti. They lived on less than $1 per day, had multiple children, no assets, no healthcare, and suffered from persistent hunger, with no reliable access to food. Fonkoze recognized that women in such extreme poverty need intensive support and guidance to get a foothold on that first Step on what had become Fonkoze's Staircase Out of Poverty. Based on BRAC's Graduation model, Fonkoze's CLM program used specially trained case managers to work with CLM members throughout an intensive 18-month process to help them build the confidence and skills necessary to create a better life for themselves and their families.

To begin, CLM provided each member with the materials to construct a 9×9 meter home with a sturdy roof, a stable floor, and a latrine; a water filter; and her choice of two activities to begin earning an income, including raising various types of livestock or merchandise to sell. Each member also received a small cash stipend while her fledgling business grows and free healthcare in partnership with Zanmi Lasante, Partners in Health's Haitian sister organization. But the CLM case managers remained at the heart of the program. Case managers made weekly visits to every member, which often required overnight stays and hours-long hikes to reach women in Haiti's most remote locations. During their visits, CLM case managers provided each member with confidence-building, enterprise management, and life skills training. They also help each woman to successfully navigate the unique challenges she encounters throughout the process and to build a plan for her future as she moves forward. In turn, the women provide the hard work, determination and resilience to succeed. On average, 96% of CLM members successfully complete the program and transform their lives.

As of December 2018, Fonkoze had worked alongside over 8,000 women and their families in Haiti's Central Plateau with the aim to help them graduate from ultra poverty.

Anne Hastings served as Director of Fonkoze from 1996 - 2009. The Board of Directors of Fonkoze Financial Services asked Anne Hastings in 2009 to take over as CEO, and Fonkoze Foundation found a new Director and leader in Dr. Carine Roenen. By 2009, Fonkoze Foundation and Fonkoze Financial Services had weathered devastating Gonaives floods in 2004 and 2008, were employing more than 750 people, serving close to 200,000 savings and loan clients, and impacting the lives the tens of thousands more.

Goudou Goudou

On January 12, 2010, the entire leadership of Fonkoze gathered in the Central Office in Port-au-Prince to discuss the upcoming year. In particular, they were assessing the funds remaining (paid back from clients who had received US-AID/Fonkoze-funded relief during the 2008 hurricanes and tropical storms). Anne was extremely interested in how Fonkoze might find a way to protect clients from the inevitable disasters that come their way. She had negotiated with US-AID to take the $2 million they had granted for hurricane credit in 2008 and leverage it to begin some sort of catastrophic insurance plan. At 4:53 p.m. that afternoon, a 7.0 earthquake rocked Haiti. Haitians called it “goudou goudou,” mimicking the guttural sound evoked by the earth during the quake.

It is estimated that anywhere from 220,000 to 316,000 people died that day. 300,000 were wounded, and 1.5 million displaced. Fonkoze's infrastructure, staff, and clients suffered unprecedented losses from the earthquake as well. Ten of Fonkoze's 41 branches collapsed or were severely damaged, over 450 of our employees suffered severe damage to or complete loss of their homes, and five of Fonkoze's employees were killed. Its clients endured paralyzing losses, as over 19,000 of them saw their homes, businesses or both wiped away during the earthquake and continued to crumble in the days following. Many clients who did not lose assets in the earthquake knew many who did, and overnight they became host families for some of the over half a million urban refugees who migrated out to rural Haiti in the weeks following the quake.

Fonkoze and its partners realized the following key achievements through our program Kore Fanmi Fonkoze (Program to Reinforce the Fonkoze Family):

- Distributed one-time cash grants to 19,811 Fonkoze clients, benefiting a total of 89,150 family members (average of 4.5 persons per family)
- Cancelled the loan balances for 10,445 qualifying members who held a loan on January 12
- Disbursed 10,993 new loans to earthquake victims who were ready to recapitalize their business
- Educated 527 clients in Léogâne on disaster preparedness and risk reduction strategies
- Provided 9,637 clients serving as host families with a one-time cash grant to reduce the financial burden of receiving house guests, and gave 4,576 of these clients who requested it a new loan.

In the months following, Fonkoze launched Kore W (Reinforce You), a client micro-catastrophic insurance plan. All clients were required to participate. While Fonkoze had the best of intentions in trying to find a way to protect its clients from inevitable disasters, Kore W failed after two years of operation. For a variety of reasons – client acceptance and understanding of insurance to business viability to Fonkoze Financial Service's financial situation – led to the end of Kore W.

In 2012, Fonkoze's Solid Women video won a Do-Gooder award for its story of five Haitian women who used Fonkoze microloans to help successfully rebuild their community in the wake of the 2010 earthquake.

In March 2013, Anne Hastings, after 17 years in Haiti, went on a leave of absence and Fonkoze Financial Services’ Board appointed a management team comprising the CFO, COO (formerly head of Internal Audit), and CIO to oversee day-to-day operations while decisions were made around the appointment of a new CEO.

The management committee decided to focus its efforts for the upcoming fiscal year on consolidating the organization's core business in light of Fonkoze Financial Services’ financial situation. The new focus for Fonkoze Financial Services, and for the entire Fonkoze Family of institutions, became to focus on the long-term viability of the organization and the mission. A renewed focus of collaboration as a family of organizations had been building since the Spring of 2012. Since its founding, the Fonkoze Family has grown tremendously and has empowered hundreds of thousands of Haitians to lift their families out of poverty.
