= Handxom =

Handxom S.A.
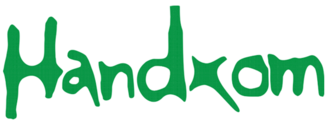
- Type: Private
- Industry: Computer hardware; Consumer electronics
- Founded: October 2013
- Founders: Jimmy Jacques (CEO)
- Headquarters: Pétion-Ville, Haiti
- Products: 3G WCDMA Router; Handxom-T1; Handxom-T3; Handxom M5 Powerbank; Handxom S5; Tablet PC 7″; Power Bank-12000mAH
- Website: handxom.com

Handxom S.A. is a Haitian technology company headquartered in Pétion-Ville, Haiti. It designs, develops, and sells computer hardware and consumer electronics, most notably, tablet computers.

== See also ==
- Comparison of tablet computers
