= Unibank (Haiti) =

Haitian bank

Unibank, S.A.
- Type: Private
- Industry: Financial services
- Founded: 1993
- Headquarters: 157, rue Faubert; Pétion-Ville, Haiti
- Key people: Franck Helmcke (Chairman and CEO)
- Revenue: US$ 95.2 million (2017)
- Net income: US$ 15.2 million (2017)
- Total assets: US$ 1.645 billion (2017)
- Number of employees: 1,311 (2017)
- Website: UnibankHaiti.com

Unibank, S.A. is one of Haiti's two largest private commercial banks. The bank was founded in 1993 by a group of Haitian investors and is the main company of Groupe Financier National (GFN). It opened its first office in July 1993 in downtown Port-au-Prince and has 51 branches throughout the country as of the end of 2017.

On December 28, 2016, Unibank acquired Scotiabank's Haiti operations. Today, Unibank is the parent company of a group of subsidiaries each concentrating in a specific financial area:

- Unicarte (Credit cards)
- Unifinance (Investment banking)
- Unicrédit (Consumer finance)
- IMSA (Real estate)
- SNI (Investment management)
- Capital Consult (Consulting firm)
- Unitransfer (Money transfer)
- Micro Crédit National (Microcredit)
- UniAssuranes (Insurance)

In October 2023, Carl Braun, Chairman Emeritus and Founding Director of Unibank, resigned from his position as a result of sanctions imposed on him by Canada. Indeed, Carl Braun is on a list of Haitian businessmen who, according to Canadian authorities, "fuel violence and instability in Haiti by engaging in corruption and other criminal acts, and by enabling armed gangs to carry out illegal activities that terrorize the population and threaten peace and security in Haiti."
