= 2015–17 Haitian parliamentary election =

- Chamber of Deputies
- 9 August 2015; 25 October 2015; 20 November 2016; 29 January 2017
- All 119 seats in the Chamber of Deputies
Party	Seats
PHTK	31
Vérité	18
KID	10
OPL	9
Fanmi Lavalas	7
Reseau National Bouclier	7
AAA	5
Inite Patriyotik	5
Fusion of Haitian Social Democrats	4
LAPEH	4
Renmen Ayiti	3
Platfòm Pitit Desalin	2
CNPPH	2
Ansanm Patriyot pou Lavni Ayiti	2
MOSANO	2
KONTRAPEPLA	1
Platfòm Leve Kanpe	1
Konsyans Patriyotik	1
MAS	1
PALMIS	1
Konbit Nasyonal	1
CANAAN	1
Mouvement National Haïtien	1
This lists parties that won seats. See the complete results below.
- Senate
- 9 August 2015; 25 October 2015; 20 November 2016
- 20 of 30 seats in the Senate
Party	Seats
Vérité	3
Haitian Tèt Kale Party	5
Fanmi Lavalas	1
Ligue Dessalinienne	1
Convention for Democratic Unity	3
Reseau National Bouclier	1
Platfòm Pitit Desalin	1
Haiti in Action	1
Struggling People's Organization	1
Pont	1
Inite Patriyotik	1
CNPPH	1
This lists parties that won seats. See the complete results below.

Parliamentary elections were held in Haiti on 9 August 2015, with a second round initially planned for 25 October. Two-thirds of the Senate and all members of the Chamber of Deputies were up for election. International observers reported that early rounds of voting experienced significant fraud, including people voting more than once due to failure of indelible ink, vote buying due to lack of secrecy, poor training of election workers, poor tracking of political parties, and other problems. This resulted in the nullification of some results and rescheduling of re-runs. The second round of the parliamentary elections that had been scheduled for October 2015 was postponed to October 2016, along with the first round for a third of the Senate and the first round of a new presidential election.

The United States withdrew funding for the October 2016 round, though it financially supported previous rounds and observers from the Organization of American States. The second round was scheduled for 9 October 2016 but was postponed to 20 November due to Hurricane Matthew. It was held together with local elections and the first round of the presidential election.

== Electoral system ==
Members of the Chamber of Deputies are elected in single-member constituencies using the two-round system; a second round being held if no candidate in a constituency wins a majority of the vote in the first round. In March 2015 an electoral decree increased the number of members in the new Chamber of Deputies from 99 to 118, with the Senate retaining the 30 members. On 13 March, President Martelly issued a decree that split the Cerca La Source in two constituencies, and therefore increasing the number of deputies to 119.

One-third of the 30-member Senate is elected every two years, also using the two-round system. However, the previous Senate elections, which had been scheduled for May 2012, were not held, meaning two-thirds of the seats were up for elections in 2015.

The Haitian election calendar was as follows:

	9 August 2015	25 October 2015	20 November 2016	29 January 2017
President		First round	First round	
Chamber of Deputies	First round (115 constituencies)	Second round (85 constituencies)	Second round rerun (1 constituency)	
Chamber of Deputies	First round (115 constituencies)		Second round (1 constituency)	
Chamber of Deputies	First round (115 constituencies)	First round rerun (21 constituencies)	Second round (19 constituencies)	
Chamber of Deputies	First round (115 constituencies)	First round rerun (21 constituencies)		Second round (1 constituency)
Chamber of Deputies		First round (4 constituencies)	Second round (3 constituency)	
Senate two-thirds	First round (10 departments)	Second round (7 departments)		
Senate two-thirds	First round (10 departments)	First round rerun (3 departments)	Second round (3 departments)	
Senate one-third			First round (10 departments)	Second round (8 departments)

== Campaign ==
A total of 2,037 candidates registered to contest the elections, representing 98 different political parties. A total of 522 candidates were disqualified in a first instance, leaving 186 candidates for the Senate and 1,329 for the Chamber of Deputies. The Provisional Electoral Council updated the list of candidates on 26 June, with the addition of 47 candidates for the Senate and 294 for the Chamber of Deputies that had been previously rejected, making a grand total of 233 candidates for senator and 1,624 for deputy.

The number of candidates among the principal parties are shown here:

Party	Candidates		
Party	Senators	Deputies	Total
Plateforme Vérité (Vérité)	15	100	115
Haitian Tèt Kale Party (Parti Haïtien Tèt Kale)	11	99	110
Fanmi Lavalas	16	83	99
Platfom Pitit Desalin	14	85	99
Fusion of Haitian Social Democrats	11	85	96
Renmen Ayiti	15	79	94
Struggling People's Organization	10	83	93
Convention for Democratic Unity	12	73	85
Pont	3	52	55
Patriotic Unity (Inite Patriyotik)	8	39	47
Respect (Respé)	6	36	42
Haiti in Action	4	36	40
PPG18	2	31	33
Patriotic Movement of the Democratic Opposition (MOPOD)	5	23	28
Peasant Platform Platfòm Peyizan	2	23	25
Christian Movement for a New Haiti	3	19	22
Other parties	96	677	774
Total	233	1,623	1,857

On September 8, 2015, candidates of the Verité party withdrew from the elections.

== Results ==
According to the preliminary results given by the Electoral Committee, there were 1,046,516 valid votes for an electorate of 5,871,450, which represents a 17.82% turnout. The elections were cancelled in 22 constituencies, and therefore there were no results for those districts.

On September 28 the Electoral Committee released definitive results, and declared elected one senator from AAA (Haiti in Action) and one from LIDE (Ligue Dessalines). For the deputies' election, 8 deputies were elected: 4 candidates from PHTK (Haitian Tèt Kale Party), 2 from AAA (Haiti in Action), 1 from VERITE (Truth) and 1 from INITE PATRIYOTIK (Patriotic Unity). The second round of the legislative election took place on October 25, along with the first round of the presidential election and the first round of the legislative election on the constituencies where the August election were cancelled.

The results of October 25 second round for the Senate says that were elected 3 candidates from KID, 3 from Verité, 2 from PHTK, and Fanmi Lavalas, PONT, OPL and Pettit Dessalines each had one. 82 deputies were elected in the second round. Eight more had already won in the first round on 9 August. The second round at the districts where the election was repeated should take place on 27 December, but on 21 December the Electoral Committee announced that the elections were postponed indefinitely.

According to Reuters, one of the elected Senators, Guy Philippe, participated in the overthrow of Jean-Bertrand Aristide and is wanted by the DEA for "conspiracy to import cocaine and launder monetary instruments". He campaigned with President-Elect Jovenel Moïse.

=== Chamber of Deputies ===

Party	First round			First round rerun			Second round			Second round rerun			Total seats
Party	Votes	%	Seats	Votes	%	Seats	Votes	%	Seats	Votes	%	Seats	Total seats
Haitian Tèt Kale Party	176,966	16.31	4	40,896	14.92	0	284,762	19.57	27				31
Vérité	141,260	13.02	1	28,579	10.43	0	281,483	19.34	16	6,465	66.53	1	18
Struggling People's Organization	77,789	7.17	0	17,868	6.52	0	111,882	7.69	9				9
Convention for Democratic Unity	69,040	6.36	0	12,931	4.72	0	109,770	7.54	10				10
Fanmi Lavalas	59,646	5.50	0	15,475	5.65	0	139,267	9.57	7				7
Fusion of Haitian Social Democrats	47,962	4.42	0	9,066	3.31	0	29,335	2.02	4				4
Reseau National Bouclier	46,753	4.31	1	12,699	4.63	0	99,422	6.83	6	3,195	32.88	0	7
Renmen Ayiti	43,645	4.02	0	12,522	4.57	0	27,616	1.90	3				3
Haiti in Action	40,060	3.69	2	11,295	4.12	0	41,645	2.86	3				5
Platfòm Pitit Desalin	34,629	3.19	0	9,721	3.55	0	29,767	2.05	2				2
Inite	29,726	2.74	1	8,511	3.10	0	36,120	2.48	4				5
Pont	28,554	2.63	0	6,731	2.46	0	33,618	2.31	0				0
Alternative League for Haitian Progress and Emancipation	24,728	2.28	0	9,048	3.30	0	48,736	3.35	4				4
Consortium National des Partis Politiques Haïtiens	17,106	1.58	0	8,030	2.93	1	9,628	0.66	1				2
Kombit Travaye Peyizan pou Libere Ayiti	16,787	1.55	0	2,146	0.78	0	13,076	0.90	1				1
Ansanm Patriyot pou Lavni Ayiti	15,212	1.40	0	7,732	2.82	0	7,002	0.48	2				2
Respect	12,624	1.16	0	2,860	1.04	0							0
Tet Kole sous Chimen Devlopman pou un Nord'Ouest Uni et Renonve	10,289	0.95	0				21,840	1.50	2				2
Christian National Union for the Reconstruction of Haiti	10,166	0.94	0	78	0.03	0	8,169	0.56	0				0
PPG18	9,119	0.84	0	1,845	0.67	0							0
Platfòm Peyizan	9,071	0.84	0	3,657	1.33	0							0
Platfòm Leve Kanpe	8,929	0.82	0	6,197	2.26	0	11,323	0.78	1				1
Konsyans Patriyotik	8,486	0.78	0	2,999	1.09	0	15,116	1.04	1				1
Christian Movement for a New Haiti	8,270	0.76	0	4,410	1.61	0							0
Socialist Action Movement	6,213	0.57	0	624	0.23	0	6,310	0.43	1				1
Rassemblement des Nationaux Démocrates Volontaires pour l'Unité Salvatrice	6,149	0.57	0	1,671	0.61	0							0
Pati Politik Fanm ak Fanmi	5,497	0.51	0	928	0.34	0							0
KONFYANS	5,429	0.50	0	151	0.06	0							0
Rasssemblement des Patriotes Haïtiens	5,248	0.48	0				12,749	0.88	0				0
Parti pour la Libération des Masses et d'Intégration Sociale	5,124	0.47	0	1,463	0.53	0	4,645	0.32	1				1
Rapwoche	5,002	0.46	0	752	0.27	0							0
Mouvement Patriotique Populaire Dessalinien	4,641	0.43	0	488	0.18	0	3,759	0.26	0				0
Haitian Republican Party	3,949	0.36	0	1,036	0.38	0							0
UNIR-AYITI INI	3,794	0.35	0	349	0.13	0							0
Mouvement Progressiste pour l'Avancement des Masses	3,569	0.33	0	1,211	0.44	0							0
Force Unite Nationale	3,362	0.31	0	1,429	0.52	0							0
REKLAM	2,994	0.28	0				4,209	0.29	0				0
Plateforme Jistis	2,727	0.25	0	228	0.08	0							0
Konbit Nasyonal	2,628	0.24	0	11,268	4.11	0	17,507	1.20	1				1
Mouvement National des Citoyens	2,526	0.23	0	1,004	0.37	0	6,568	0.45	0				0
Alliance Démocratique pour la Reconciliation Nationale	2,449	0.23	0	88	0.03	0							0
CANAAN	2,431	0.22	0	3,584	1.31	0	7,050	0.48	1				1
Entente Nationale des Travailleurs pour le Reveil d'Haïti	2,352	0.22	0	1,439	0.52	0							0
ATERI	2,209	0.20	0	257	0.09	0							0
Aksyon pou Konstwi yon Ayiti Oganize	2,195	0.20	0										0
Concorde Nationale	2,132	0.20	0										0
Mouvement National Haïtien	2,128	0.20	0	149	0.05	0	4,305	0.30	1				1
Union des Patriotes pour l'Avancement National	2,109	0.19	0	51	0.02	0							0
Veye Yo	1,977	0.18	0										0
Regroupement Patriotique pour le Renouveau National	1,905	0.18	0	1,317	0.48	0							0
Parti de la Diaspora Haïtienne pour Haïti	1,810	0.17	0										0
Retabli Ayiti	1,691	0.16	0	128	0.05	0							0
BLOC 20	1,668	0.15	0	109	0.04	0							0
Cohesion Nationale des Partis Politiques Haïtiens	1,607	0.15	0	58	0.02	0							0
Parti National Justice pour Tous	1,557	0.14	0										0
Christian Democratic Party of Haiti	1,553	0.14	0										0
Action Démocratie pour Bâtir Haïti	1,548	0.14	0	1,723	0.63	0							0
KONVIKSYON	1,545	0.14	0										0
Konbit pou Ayiti	1,509	0.14	0										0
Union Nationale des Démocrates Haïtiens	1,340	0.12	0	925	0.34	0							0
Front Uni pour la Renaissance d'Haïti	1,308	0.12	0	15	0.01	0							0
Ligue Dessalinienne	1,261	0.12	0										0
Federalist Party	1,260	0.12	0				4,635	0.32	0				0
Grand Rassemblement pour l'Evolution d'Haïti	1,155	0.11	0										0
Rassemblement des Citoyens Patriotiques	1,150	0.11	0										0
Nouvelle Haïti	1,145	0.11	0	1,305	0.48	0							0
Pati Kreyol Nou Ye	1,123	0.10	0	546	0.20	0							0
Mobilisation pour le Progrès d'Haïti	1,028	0.09	0										0
Parti Populaire National	958	0.09	0										0
Force Démocratique Haïtien Intégré	937	0.09	0	174	0.06	0							0
Haitian United Socialist Party	729	0.07	0	261	0.10	0							0
Mouvement d'Union Republicaine	721	0.07	0	93	0.03	0							0
Kombit Liberasyon Ekonomik	685	0.06	0	54	0.02	0							0
Platforme Ayisyen Kap Travay pou Rekonstwi Ayiti Infyel ak Liberel	666	0.06	0										0
SOLUTION	666	0.06	0	248	0.09	0							0
Parti pour l'Evolution Nationale Haïtienne	624	0.06	0										0
Tèt Ansanm	604	0.06	0	225	0.08	0							0
National Christian Party of Haiti	542	0.05	0	1,773	0.65	0							0
Alternative Socialiste	533	0.05	0										0
Mouvement Independent Kitirel Social Economie ak Politik an Ayiti	485	0.04	0										0
Organisation Pour l'Avancement d'Haïti et des Haïtiens	479	0.04	0	17	0.01	0							0
MOPANOU	452	0.04	0										0
MRA	428	0.04	0										0
Mouvement pour l'Instauration de la Démocratie en Haïti	421	0.04	0										0
Regeneration Economique et Sociale dans l'Unite et la Liberte Totale d'Action de Tous	414	0.04	0										0
Front Civico-Politique Haïtien	399	0.04	0										0
Delivrans	347	0.03	0	68	0.02	0							0
Plan d'Action Citoyenne	233	0.02	0	7	0.00	0							0
Parti Démocratique Institutionaliste	222	0.02	0										0
Plateforme Politique Antre Nou	212	0.02	0										0
Parti Agricole Haïtien	174	0.02	0										0
Coalition pour la Convention de la Reconstruction de la Reconciliation des Citoyens Haïtiens	94	0.01	0										0
Olahh Baton Jenes La	62	0.01	0										0
Konbit Sitwayen	29	0.00	0										0
Haitian Nationalist Party	17	0.00	0	8	0.00	0							0
None of the above	9,898	0.91	–	1,615	0.59	–	23,954	1.65	–	58	0.60	–	–
Total	1,084,845	100.00	9	274,135	100.00	1	1,455,268	100.00	108	9,718	100.00	1	119
Valid votes	1,084,845	93.30		274,135	95.54		1,455,268	98.74		9,718	92.85		
Invalid	77,878	6.70		12,799	4.46		18,644	1.26		748	7.15		
Total votes	1,162,723	100.00		286,934	100.00		1,473,912	100.00		10,466	100.00		

==== Results by constituency ====
Election results by constituency in Artibonite

Desdunes
Candidate	Party	First round 25 October 2015		Second round 20 November 2016	
Candidate	Party	Votes	%	Votes	%
Baudelaire Noelsaint	Struggling People's Organization	2,692	39.58	4,089	57.68
Isaac Ceus	Haiti in Action	2,178	32.02	2,990	42.18
Daricot Odige	Fanmi Lavalas	790	11.61		
Fedelin Pierre	Reseau National Bouclier	706	10.38		
Rogès Alcius	Christian Movement for a New Haiti	221	3.25		
Exantus Schnider Andre	Renmen Ayiti	167	2.46		
None of the above		48	0.71	10	0.14
Total		6,802	100.00	7,089	100.00
Valid votes		6,802	97.84	7,089	98.25
Invalid/blank votes		150	2.16	126	1.75
Total votes		6,952	100.00	7,215	100.00

Dessalines 9 August 2015
Candidate	Party	Votes	%
Delva Garcia	Haitian Tèt Kale Party	4,925	61.06
Vixama Hyppolite	Konvansyon Inite Demokratik	1,574	19.51
Jean Marc-Elie	Platfòm Leve Kanpe	426	5.28
Desilme Pierre	Respect	393	4.87
Guillaume Carlos	Platfòm Pitit Desalin	260	3.22
Alexandre Asnel	Cohesion Nationale des Partis Politiques Haïtiens	224	2.78
Beaugé Egayé	Christian Movement for a New Haiti	197	2.44
Jean Baptiste Lorigene	Union des Patriotes pour l'Avancement National	42	0.52
None of the above		25	0.31
Total		8,066	100.00
Valid votes		8,066	98.20
Invalid/blank votes		148	1.80
Total votes		8,214	100.00

Ennery 9 August 2015
Candidate	Party	Votes	%
Cholzer Chancy	Haiti in Action	4,243	73.80
Dieusibon Fils-Aime	Struggling People's Organization	1,471	25.59
None of the above		35	0.61
Total		5,749	100.00
Valid votes		5,749	97.71
Invalid/blank votes		135	2.29
Total votes		5,884	100.00

Gonaives
Candidate	Party	First round 9 August 2015		Second round 25 October 2015	
Candidate	Party	Votes	%	Votes	%
Latortue Jacob	Haiti in Action	4,873	21.30	15,132	49.04
Derius Netlande Pierre	Konvansyon Inite Demokratik	1,754	7.67	15,222	49.33
Etienne Guibert	Reseau National Bouclier	1,735	7.58		
Dieujuste Arsene	Christian Movement for a New Haiti	1,677	7.33		
Gene Renaud	Vérité	1,607	7.02		
Mondelus Dimilsaint	Kombit Travaye Peyizan pou Libere Ayiti	1,493	6.53		
Dalencourt Herby	Haitian Tèt Kale Party	1,108	4.84		
Francois Rigot	Fusion of Haitian Social Democrats	1,005	4.39		
Desir Sylvain	Renmen Ayiti	983	4.30		
Bien-Aime Washny	Struggling People's Organization	966	4.22		
Noel William	Fanmi Lavalas	730	3.19		
Baron Antonio	UNIR-AYITI INI	616	2.69		
Derius Delivra	Platfòm Pitit Desalin	614	2.68		
Legrand Mikerlande Metellus	Union des Patriotes pour l'Avancement National	558	2.44		
Demosthene Jonas	Konsyans Patriyotik	497	2.17		
Jean Pierre Marc Antoine	Action Démocratie pour Bâtir Haïti	426	1.86		
Paul Marc Andre	Alternative League for Haitian Progress and Emancipation	375	1.64		
Desir Giovany	Haitian Republican Party	366	1.60		
Corielan Dahney	Entente Nationale des Travailleurs pour le Reveil d'Haïti	353	1.54		
Jean Kelly	Rassemblement des Nationaux Démocrates Volontaires pour l'Unité Salvatrice	286	1.25		
Telusme Pierre Junior	Pati Politik Fanm ak Fanmi	221	0.97		
Dossous Corvens	Retabli Ayiti	193	0.84		
Cadet Ernst	Mouvement Patriotique Populaire Dessalinien	145	0.63		
Jn Baptiste Edler	Tèt Ansanm	83	0.36		
None of the above		217	0.95	501	1.62
Total		22,881	100.00	30,855	100.00
Valid votes		22,881	95.08	30,855	95.82
Invalid/blank votes		1,183	4.92	1,346	4.18
Total votes		24,064	100.00	32,201	100.00

Grande-Saline 25 October 2015
Candidate	Party	Votes	%
Alsace Hubert Dieu	Reseau National Bouclier	1,686	47.36
Desormes Danack	Struggling People's Organization	759	21.32
Clerzius Pitherson	Alternative League for Haitian Progress and Emancipation	372	10.45
Louis Vodray	Platfòm Pitit Desalin	307	8.62
Desir Figaro	Fanmi Lavalas	192	5.39
Paul Sheden Balzac	Respect	94	2.64
Jean-Mary Yrbenson	Renmen Ayiti	76	2.13
Obil Croyance	Cohesion Nationale des Partis Politiques Haïtiens	72	2.02
None of the above		2	0.06
Total		3,560	100.00
Valid votes		3,560	97.61
Invalid/blank votes		87	2.39
Total votes		3,647	100.00

Gros-Morne 9 August 2015
Candidate	Party	Votes	%
Chery Fritz	Haiti in Action	6,963	48.59
Etienne Richardson	Struggling People's Organization	2,207	15.40
Neptune Rosner	Vérité	1,867	13.03
Senor Ceremy	Platfòm Leve Kanpe	1,221	8.52
Camille Gregory	Christian Movement for a New Haiti	622	4.34
Edouard Jean Claude	Fusion of Haitian Social Democrats	592	4.13
Oremat Jonel	Christian National Union for the Reconstruction of Haiti	292	2.04
André Mathieu	Konvansyon Inite Demokratik	258	1.80
Septama Innocent	Renmen Ayiti	201	1.40
None of the above		106	0.74
Total		14,329	100.00
Valid votes		14,329	92.48
Invalid/blank votes		1,165	7.52
Total votes		15,494	100.00

La Chapelle
Candidate	Party	First round 9 August 2015		Second round 25 October 2015	
Candidate	Party	Votes	%	Votes	%
Exinord Hermano	Inite Patriyotik	1,878	42.05	3,843	57.62
Salomon Fanel	Haiti in Action	1,209	27.07	2,799	41.96
Macajoux Pierre Alix	Haitian Tèt Kale Party	623	13.95		
Estiverne Antoine	Fusion of Haitian Social Democrats	374	8.37		
Charidieu Victor	Reseau National Bouclier	233	5.22		
Mondesir Berthony	Pont	82	1.84		
Mondesir Enrio	Fanmi Lavalas	52	1.16		
Saintilus Lesly	Renmen Ayiti	14	0.31		
None of the above		1	0.02	28	0.42
Total		4,466	100.00	6,670	100.00
Valid votes		4,466	97.47	6,670	97.30
Invalid/blank votes		116	2.53	185	2.70
Total votes		4,582	100.00	6,855	100.00

L'Anse Rouge
Candidate	Party	First round 9 August 2015		Second round 25 October 2015	
Candidate	Party	Votes	%	Votes	%
Chery Edouanel	Haiti in Action	1,494	21.74	4,053	52.22
Ledix Ronald	Reseau National Bouclier	1,091	15.87	3,681	47.43
Gedeon Genier	Konvansyon Inite Demokratik	988	14.38		
Joseph Metayer Fils Brunel	Haitian Tèt Kale Party	920	13.39		
Dumel Petion	Vérité	474	6.90		
Geffrard Delicier	Renmen Ayiti	348	5.06		
Senexant Jean-Philipp Yvenia	Fusion of Haitian Social Democrats	318	4.63		
Georges Patrick	Haitian Republican Party	242	3.52		
Jn Francois Fragner	Pati Politik Fanm ak Fanmi	184	2.68		
Innocent Francellus	Union Nationale des Démocrates Haïtiens	176	2.56		
Jean Louis Emmanuel	Respect	167	2.43		
Geffrard Guiftasson	Union des Patriotes pour l'Avancement National	151	2.20		
Labranche Caleb	Christian Movement for a New Haiti	138	2.01		
Dessalines Kesly	PPG18	130	1.89		
Sajous Smith	Delivrans	31	0.45		
None of the above		21	0.31	27	0.35
Total		6,873	100.00	7,761	100.00
Valid votes		6,873	96.06	7,761	98.40
Invalid/blank votes		282	3.94	126	1.60
Total votes		7,155	100.00	7,887	100.00

L'Estere
Candidate	Party	First round 9 August 2015		Second round 25 October 2015	
Candidate	Party	Votes	%	Votes	%
Exantus Reynald	Struggling People's Organization	1,455	23.61	4,303	57.59
Estard Carlo	Haiti in Action	922	14.96	3,095	41.42
Alexandre Lesly	Vérité	718	11.65		
Pasteur Watson	Fanmi Lavalas	501	8.13		
Ulysse Michel Daniel	Regroupement Patriotique pour le Renouveau National	424	6.88		
Anelus Jules Lyonel	Ansanm Patriyot pou Lavni Ayiti	388	6.30		
Elie Ricot	Reseau National Bouclier	357	5.79		
Ernest Raphael	Haitian Tèt Kale Party	345	5.60		
Noel Eliphete	Konvansyon Inite Demokratik	245	3.98		
Glaude Renard Loridson	Respect	242	3.93		
Madestin Emmanuel	Fusion of Haitian Social Democrats	184	2.99		
Thelot Ernst	Konsyans Patriyotik	119	1.93		
Etienne Jean Robert	Renmen Ayiti	61	0.99		
Simon Kesner	Platfòm Pitit Desalin	60	0.97		
Normil Gelaire	Consortium National des Partis Politiques Haïtiens	55	0.89		
Emile Walky	Pont	49	0.80		
Francois Jean Diego	Alternative League for Haitian Progress and Emancipation	19	0.31		
Michel Maudeline	Christian National Union for the Reconstruction of Haiti	13	0.21		
Revangil Elie Conserve	Concorde Nationale	3	0.05		
None of the above		2	0.03	74	0.99
Total		6,162	100.00	7,472	100.00
Valid votes		6,162	98.73	7,472	98.21
Invalid/blank votes		79	1.27	136	1.79
Total votes		6,241	100.00	7,608	100.00

Marmelade
Candidate	Party	First round 9 August 2015		Second round 25 October 2015	
Candidate	Party	Votes	%	Votes	%
Raphael Salem	Vérité	1,835	31.76	2,967	54.16
Vilmar Wilson	Inite Patriyotik	1,287	22.27	2,499	45.62
Destin Altes	Haiti in Action	853	14.76		
Dorcely Dejean Presnel	Respect	438	7.58		
Perard Smith	Reseau National Bouclier	258	4.47		
Elvariste Michelot	Rassemblement des Nationaux Démocrates Volontaires pour l'Unité Salvatrice	197	3.41		
Cinord Dieufait	Konvansyon Inite Demokratik	182	3.15		
Jerome Jhon	Pati Politik Fanm ak Fanmi	175	3.03		
Devalsaint Nucson	Aksyon pou Konstwi yon Ayiti Oganize	137	2.37		
Saint-Louis Jean Ronald	Fusion of Haitian Social Democrats	95	1.64		
Valcourt Raoul	Platfòm Pitit Desalin	95	1.64		
Fabien Jean Baptiste	Alternative League for Haitian Progress and Emancipation	74	1.28		
Dalus Sylvanie	Consortium National des Partis Politiques Haïtiens	63	1.09		
Sylvain Mecanix	Renmen Ayiti	44	0.76		
None of the above		45	0.78	12	0.22
Total		5,778	100.00	5,478	100.00
Valid votes		5,778	87.57	5,478	95.02
Invalid/blank votes		820	12.43	287	4.98
Total votes		6,598	100.00	5,765	100.00

Petite Riviere de 'Artibonite
Candidate	Party	First round 9 August 2015		First round rerun 25 October 2015		Second round 20 November 2016	
Candidate	Party	Votes	%	Votes	%	Votes	%
Victor Prophane	Reseau National Bouclier	930	15.04	3,599	18.56	6,601	54.84
Fontil Louiner	Haiti in Action	380	6.15	2,217	11.43	5,321	44.21
Cyrius G. Venex	Konvansyon Inite Demokratik	514	8.31	1,815	9.36		
Philistin Rilet	PPG18	670	10.84	1,392	7.18		
Archibald James Wardens	Alternative League for Haitian Progress and Emancipation	447	7.23	1,322	6.82		
Datus Bobanes	Regroupement Patriotique pour le Renouveau National	522	8.44	1,287	6.64		
Fadael Fauvert	Parti pour la Libération des Masses et d'Intégration Sociale	225	3.64	1,166	6.01		
Rene Wilson	Haitian Tèt Kale Party	97	1.57	1,105	5.70		
Lormeus Fricot	Konsyans Patriyotik	79	1.28	965	4.98		
Cirismond Mauril	Fusion of Haitian Social Democrats	448	7.25	937	4.83		
Dorcena Onald	Vérité	388	6.28	809	4.17		
Cenat Esperandieu	Rassemblement des Nationaux Démocrates Volontaires pour l'Unité Salvatrice	198	3.20	732	3.77		
Dantes Riviere	Platfòm Pitit Desalin	111	1.80	644	3.32		
Myrtil Herald	Pont	98	1.59	331	1.71		
Gracien Morange	Struggling People's Organization	350	5.66	297	1.53		
Maurice Wiggins Von	Fanmi Lavalas	85	1.37	145	0.75		
Mortel Gardy Edouard	Force Unite Nationale	11	0.18	134	0.69		
Celidon Junior Paul	Inite Patriyotik	88	1.42	99	0.51		
Myrtil Nicols	Delivrans	75	1.21	68	0.35		
Celian Alex	Renmen Ayiti	7	0.11	63	0.32		
Estimable Jean Emile	Konbit Nasyonal	47	0.76	41	0.21		
Destina Philippe	Mouvement Progressiste pour l'Avancement des Masses	16	0.26	39	0.20		
Lubin Anes	Mouvement Patriotique Populaire Dessalinien	88	1.42	25	0.13		
Duvalsaint Luc Wans	Kombit Travaye Peyizan pou Libere Ayiti	171	2.77	25	0.13		
Demosthene Bazelais	Christian National Union for the Reconstruction of Haiti	47	0.76	21	0.11		
Pierre-Louis Nicolas	Platfòm Leve Kanpe	33	0.53	19	0.10		
St-Thelus Jean Robert	Consortium National des Partis Politiques Haïtiens	29	0.47	10	0.05		
None of the above		28	0.45	88	0.45	115	0.96
Total		6,182	100.00	19,395	100.00	12,037	100.00
Valid votes		6,182	95.92	19,395	96.59	12,037	97.79
Invalid/blank votes		263	4.08	685	3.41	272	2.21
Total votes		6,445	100.00	20,080	100.00	12,309	100.00

Saint Marc
Candidate	Party	First round 9 August 2015		First round rerun 25 October 2015		Second round 20 November 2016	
Candidate	Party	Votes	%	Votes	%	Votes	%
D'haiti Samuel	Konbit Nasyonal	1,506	31.67	11,127	40.05	17,507	65.47
Narcisse Jean-Hugues	Konvansyon Inite Demokratik	401	8.43	4,772	17.18	8,916	33.34
Toussaint Altes	Platfòm Peyizan	451	9.48	3,069	11.05		
Louis Laviguens	Christian Movement for a New Haiti	311	6.54	2,508	9.03		
Develsaint Jean Rony	Haiti in Action	248	5.22	1,534	5.52		
Toussaint David	Nouvelle Haïti	267	5.62	1,290	4.64		
Volcy Isaac	Reseau National Bouclier	81	1.70	681	2.45		
Charles Arriel	Haitian Tèt Kale Party	123	2.59	486	1.75		
Bazelais Thevenot	Fanmi Lavalas	201	4.23	382	1.37		
Cajuste Joseph Yves	Platfòm Pitit Desalin	148	3.11	361	1.30		
Ulysse Jean Nardin	Renmen Ayiti	215	4.52	326	1.17		
William Marie Vaniola	Vérité	119	2.50	189	0.68		
Nherisson Jean Robert	ATERI	95	2.00	166	0.60		
Joseph Patsy	Alternative League for Haitian Progress and Emancipation	74	1.56	143	0.51		
Servilus Clervoyant	Pati Politik Fanm ak Fanmi	113	2.38	125	0.45		
Dameus Glemeau	Consortium National des Partis Politiques Haïtiens	28	0.59	67	0.24		
Valery Pierre-Michel Antoine	Konsyans Patriyotik	167	3.51	63	0.23		
Jules Renold	Platfòm Leve Kanpe	96	2.02	58	0.21		
Louis Octa Nicolas	Fusion of Haitian Social Democrats	42	0.88	50	0.18		
Vertilus Serge	Rapwoche	6	0.13	42	0.15		
Calixte Reginald	Entente Nationale des Travailleurs pour le Reveil d'Haïti	25	0.53	31	0.11		
Joseph Chesnel	Haitian Nationalist Party	17	0.36	8	0.03		
None of the above		21	0.44	306	1.10	317	1.19
Total		4,755	100.00	27,784	100.00	26,740	100.00
Valid votes		4,755	95.96	27,784	96.03	26,740	97.69
Invalid/blank votes		200	4.04	1,149	3.97	631	2.31
Total votes		4,955	100.00	28,933	100.00	27,371	100.00

Saint-Michel
Candidate	Party	First round 9 August 2015		Second round 25 October 2015	
Candidate	Party	Votes	%	Votes	%
Joseph Patrick	Platfòm Pitit Desalin	2,782	21.59	7,036	41.67
Amilcar Myriam	Vérité	2,651	20.57	9,757	57.78
Ceneus Helman	Konvansyon Inite Demokratik	1,924	14.93		
Elius Moise	UNIR-AYITI INI	1,390	10.79		
Jean Louis Gerilien	Haiti in Action	1,276	9.90		
Brutus Michelet	Haitian Tèt Kale Party	1,049	8.14		
Meltinord Verdieu	Kombit Travaye Peyizan pou Libere Ayiti	765	5.94		
Petit-Frere Gesper	Renmen Ayiti	323	2.51		
Dezallant Wisly	Mouvement pour l'Instauration de la Démocratie en Haïti	225	1.75		
Francois Guilot	Consortium National des Partis Politiques Haïtiens	224	1.74		
Menard Maxime Francois	Platfòm Peyizan	216	1.68		
None of the above		60	0.47	93	0.55
Total		12,885	100.00	16,886	100.00
Valid votes		12,885	88.59	16,886	94.35
Invalid/blank votes		1,660	11.41	1,011	5.65
Total votes		14,545	100.00	17,897	100.00

Terre-Neuve
Candidate	Party	First round 9 August 2015		Second round 25 October 2015	
Candidate	Party	Votes	%	Votes	%
Jacques Dulaurier	Haiti in Action	2,263	44.27	3,660	55.49
Rosemond Jodson Leroy	Reseau National Bouclier	1,486	29.07	2,895	43.89
Delfils Enock	Vérité	1,050	20.54		
Alexandre Wilhem	Pont	292	5.71		
Eugene Adhemard	Inite Patriyotik	5	0.10		
None of the above		16	0.31	41	0.62
Total		5,112	100.00	6,596	100.00
Valid votes		5,112	97.19	6,596	99.17
Invalid/blank votes		148	2.81	55	0.83
Total votes		5,260	100.00	6,651	100.00

Verrettes
Candidate	Party	First round 9 August 2015		First round rerun 25 October 2015		Second round 20 November 2016	
Candidate	Party	Votes	%	Votes	%	Votes	%
Paul Lormeus Gerard	Platfòm Leve Kanpe	1,565	20.56	4,934	25.57	8,999	58.20
Laurent Josnem	Inite Patriyotik	920	12.08	4,904	25.42	6,366	41.17
Pierre Junior Herve	Haiti in Action	1,356	17.81	4,831	25.04		
Pierre Louis Nobert	Fanmi Lavalas	1,096	14.40	1,979	10.26		
Derilus Vikens	Struggling People's Organization	655	8.60	742	3.85		
Mertus Patrick	Alternative League for Haitian Progress and Emancipation	235	3.09	482	2.50		
Jean Pierre Frantz	Vérité	551	7.24	446	2.31		
Thelot Joab	Rapwoche	131	1.72	276	1.43		
Benoit Stanley	Consortium National des Partis Politiques Haïtiens	247	3.24	249	1.29		
Longchamp Phenol	Haitian Tèt Kale Party	143	1.88	207	1.07		
Louis Junior	Respect	34	0.45	63	0.33		
Philistin Yrlande	Konbit Nasyonal	151	1.98	52	0.27		
Grandoit Michel Frantz	Platfòm Pitit Desalin	44	0.58	38	0.20		
Merone Guimy	Fusion of Haitian Social Democrats	464	6.09	24	0.12		
None of the above		21	0.28	66	0.34	97	0.63
Total		7,613	100.00	19,293	100.00	15,462	100.00
Valid votes		7,613	98.33	19,293	98.59	15,462	98.40
Invalid/blank votes		129	1.67	276	1.41	252	1.60
Total votes		7,742	100.00	19,569	100.00	15,714	100.00

Election results by constituency in Centre

Belladere
Candidate	Party	First round 9 August 2015		Second round 25 October 2015	
Candidate	Party	Votes	%	Votes	%
Lutherking Emmanuel Marcadieu	Vérité	3,602	32.16	5,851	41.60
Guerrard Guerchon	Fusion of Haitian Social Democrats	3,074	27.44	8,179	58.16
Duboirant Amos	Renmen Ayiti	2,798	24.98		
Luberice Renald	Haitian Tèt Kale Party	907	8.10		
Oupette Casner	Fanmi Lavalas	278	2.48		
Lachapelle Jules	Rapwoche	207	1.85		
Jean Mozard	Haitian Republican Party	171	1.53		
Monclair Yvonne	Pati Politik Fanm ak Fanmi	65	0.58		
None of the above		99	0.88	34	0.24
Total		11,201	100.00	14,064	100.00
Valid votes		11,201	89.31	14,064	96.43
Invalid/blank votes		1,341	10.69	521	3.57
Total votes		12,542	100.00	14,585	100.00

Boucan Carre
Candidate	Party	First round 9 August 2015		First round rerun 25 October 2015		Second round 20 November 2016	
Candidate	Party	Votes	%	Votes	%	Votes	%
Jean Jude	Haitian Tèt Kale Party	502	25.55	2,218	27.67	3,382	53.09
Saint Jean Erinece	Struggling People's Organization	699	35.57	1,917	23.92	2,981	46.80
Pierre Odelince	Kombit Travaye Peyizan pou Libere Ayiti	127	6.46	957	11.94		
Michel Charlemagne	Fusion of Haitian Social Democrats	73	3.72	540	6.74		
Simon Michelet	Fanmi Lavalas	287	14.61	385	4.80		
Joseph Raymond	Vérité	52	2.65	379	4.73		
Janvier Marie Andre	Konvansyon Inite Demokratik	14	0.71	346	4.32		
Denoe Guerrier	Parti pour la Libération des Masses et d'Intégration Sociale	37	1.88	297	3.71		
Desire Samuel	Reseau National Bouclier	23	1.17	249	3.11		
St Jean Estivenson	Rapwoche	15	0.76	201	2.51		
Dely Pierre Dieuseul	Haitian Republican Party	10	0.51	149	1.86		
Calixte Marie Myrtau	Renmen Ayiti	38	1.93	148	1.85		
Marseille Lundad	Inite Patriyotik	5	0.25	53	0.66		
Louis-Fils Jean Scheller	Platfòm Pitit Desalin	8	0.41	46	0.57		
Derose Yvon	Mouvement Patriotique Populaire Dessalinien	5	0.25	33	0.41		
Michel Jean Dady	Consortium National des Partis Politiques Haïtiens	49	2.49	33	0.41		
Louis Laurenel	Entente Nationale des Travailleurs pour le Reveil d'Haïti	10	0.51	27	0.34		
None of the above		11	0.56	37	0.46	7	0.11
Total		1,965	100.00	8,015	100.00	6,370	100.00
Valid votes		1,965	85.88	8,015	91.64	6,370	93.10
Invalid/blank votes		323	14.12	731	8.36	472	6.90
Total votes		2,288	100.00	8,746	100.00	6,842	100.00

Cerca-Carvajal/Quartier De Los Palis 9 August 2015
Candidate	Party	Votes	%
Bien-Aime A. Rodon	Haitian Tèt Kale Party	3,185	76.67
Jn Baptiste Lérés	Respect	746	17.96
Pierre Mikelange	MRA	126	3.03
Raphael Wide	Kombit Travaye Peyizan pou Libere Ayiti	60	1.44
Bien-Aime Fritznel	Platfòm Pitit Desalin	27	0.65
None of the above		10	0.24
Total		4,154	100.00
Valid votes		4,154	95.12
Invalid/blank votes		213	4.88
Total votes		4,367	100.00

Cerca-La-Source 9 August 2015
Candidate	Party	Votes	%
Celestin Rony	Haitian Tèt Kale Party	5,027	64.84
Clement Odrience	Renmen Ayiti	642	8.28
Pierre Petrus	Vérité	531	6.85
Millien Max	Reseau National Bouclier	446	5.75
Cadeau Jacques	Fusion of Haitian Social Democrats	439	5.66
Flereme Pelex	Kombit Travaye Peyizan pou Libere Ayiti	306	3.95
Louis Flood	Konvansyon Inite Demokratik	196	2.53
Prophil Thomas	PPG18	73	0.94
Milfort Faulince	Mouvement National Haïtien	51	0.66
Simoly Fedner	Struggling People's Organization	29	0.37
None of the above		13	0.17
Total		7,753	100.00
Valid votes		7,753	98.33
Invalid/blank votes		132	1.67
Total votes		7,885	100.00

Hinche
Candidate	Party	First round 9 August 2015		Second round 25 October 2015	
Candidate	Party	Votes	%	Votes	%
Pitton Fred	Konvansyon Inite Demokratik	3,550	20.76	10,107	50.27
Louis Vaniet	Kombit Travaye Peyizan pou Libere Ayiti	2,623	15.34	9,839	48.94
Renard Beckenbauer	Reseau National Bouclier	2,145	12.55		
Noel Paules	Fusion of Haitian Social Democrats	2,026	11.85		
Veard Esdras	Struggling People's Organization	1,206	7.05		
Jean Gilles Yves Thomas W.	Haitian Tèt Kale Party	1,097	6.42		
Antoine Acfenes	Platfòm Pitit Desalin	960	5.62		
Augustin Gilbert	Parti pour la Libération des Masses et d'Intégration Sociale	848	4.96		
Balde Poincyla	Haiti in Action	704	4.12		
Bastia Guerchang	Platfòm Leve Kanpe	684	4.00		
Pierre Presmy	Vérité	353	2.06		
Dubuisson Charline	Inite Patriyotik	273	1.60		
Cheristin Juliot	Rassemblement des Nationaux Démocrates Volontaires pour l'Unité Salvatrice	199	1.16		
Metellus Eles	UNIR-AYITI INI	177	1.04		
Philemy Fred	Plateforme Jistis	66	0.39		
Michel Bosseneque	Olahh Baton Jenes La	51	0.30		
Dampaix Metellus Gladys	Pati Politik Fanm ak Fanmi	51	0.30		
None of the above		84	0.49	160	0.80
Total		17,097	100.00	20,106	100.00
Valid votes		17,097	89.47	20,106	95.03
Invalid/blank votes		2,012	10.53	1,052	4.97
Total votes		19,109	100.00	21,158	100.00

Lascahobas 9 August 2015
Candidate	Party	Votes	%
Jean Gabriel Lyonel	Vérité	4,199	45.09
Sigue Markent'z	Haitian Tèt Kale Party	1,142	12.26
Carietane Nardy	Reseau National Bouclier	1,070	11.49
Jean Mary Victor	Renmen Ayiti	999	10.73
Saint Germain Rubens	Fusion of Haitian Social Democrats	612	6.57
Pierre Louis Walnes	Konvansyon Inite Demokratik	487	5.23
Jean Bernadette	Kombit Travaye Peyizan pou Libere Ayiti	253	2.72
Richard Richardson Jacob	Struggling People's Organization	203	2.18
Pierre Osner	Inite Patriyotik	151	1.62
Montinat Jayro	Ansanm Patriyot pou Lavni Ayiti	129	1.39
Domond Josue	Platfòm Pitit Desalin	22	0.24
Jean Fontus	Mouvement Patriotique Populaire Dessalinien	17	0.18
None of the above		28	0.30
Total		9,312	100.00
Valid votes		9,312	95.29
Invalid/blank votes		460	4.71
Total votes		9,772	100.00

Maissade
Candidate	Party	First round 9 August 2015		Second round 25 October 2015	
Candidate	Party	Votes	%	Votes	%
Beauge Louis Romel	Haitian Tèt Kale Party	2,448	26.71	6,882	55.55
Jean Baptiste Denis Joseph	Konvansyon Inite Demokratik	1,429	15.59	5,484	44.27
Joseph Josselin	Renmen Ayiti	1,148	12.53		
Nobert Dechanel	Struggling People's Organization	1,005	10.97		
Belimaire Emmanuel	Vérité	897	9.79		
Joseph Jean Leonard	Kombit Travaye Peyizan pou Libere Ayiti	689	7.52		
Romain Musset	Platfòm Peyizan	429	4.68		
Codio Carl-Herve	Mouvement Patriotique Populaire Dessalinien	239	2.61		
Wancourt Ulrick	Parti pour la Libération des Masses et d'Intégration Sociale	196	2.14		
Desarmes Anglade	Alliance Démocratique pour la Reconciliation Nationale	154	1.68		
Fameux Fred	Fusion of Haitian Social Democrats	138	1.51		
Bernadin Keny	Parti Populaire National	124	1.35		
Nivard David	Haiti in Action	119	1.30		
Alexis Gregoire	Fanmi Lavalas	78	0.85		
Louis Dieulous	Front Uni pour la Renaissance d'Haïti	22	0.24		
None of the above		50	0.55	22	0.18
Total		9,165	100.00	12,388	100.00
Valid votes		9,165	84.47	12,388	95.22
Invalid/blank votes		1,685	15.53	622	4.78
Total votes		10,850	100.00	13,010	100.00

Mirebalais
Candidate	Party	First round 9 August 2015		Second round 25 October 2015	
Candidate	Party	Votes	%	Votes	%
Descollines Abel	Haitian Tèt Kale Party	4,387	38.74	9,665	63.76
Lubin Jean-Claude	Platfòm Pitit Desalin	2,066	18.24		
Dorelien Fantal	Fanmi Lavalas	818	7.22		
Pierre Renald	Struggling People's Organization	808	7.13	5,351	35.30
Gardere Gabriel	Inite Patriyotik	740	6.53		
Pierre Toussaint Mamousse	Kombit Travaye Peyizan pou Libere Ayiti	695	6.14		
Medor Marconi	Fusion of Haitian Social Democrats	377	3.33		
Desgrottes Jean Franchy	Vérité	321	2.83		
Cenanfils Junior	Pati Politik Fanm ak Fanmi	286	2.53		
Exilhomme Ernst	Alternative League for Haitian Progress and Emancipation	268	2.37		
Noisette Guy	Mouvement Patriotique Populaire Dessalinien	227	2.00		
Jean Hilaire Paul Wilson	Front Uni pour la Renaissance d'Haïti	77	0.68		
Saintelus Richard	Consortium National des Partis Politiques Haïtiens	74	0.65		
Pierre Elizé	Christian Movement for a New Haiti	71	0.63		
None of the above		110	0.97	142	0.94
Total		11,325	100.00	15,158	100.00
Valid votes		11,325	90.64	15,158	95.89
Invalid/blank votes		1,170	9.36	650	4.11
Total votes		12,495	100.00	15,808	100.00

Saut-d'Eau
Candidate	Party	First round 9 August 2015		Second round 25 October 2015	
Candidate	Party	Votes	%	Votes	%
Smith Romial	Parti pour la Libération des Masses et d'Intégration Sociale	2,857	36.82	4,645	53.34
Romulus Marc Faublas	Haitian Tèt Kale Party	2,673	34.45		
Louis Jeune Prospere	Fusion of Haitian Social Democrats	1,450	18.69	4,042	46.42
Annay Antoine	Struggling People's Organization	256	3.30		
Nozil Jonel	Renmen Ayiti	173	2.23		
Joachim Jean Raphael	Vérité	165	2.13		
Vilton Adrien	PPG18	92	1.19		
Casseus Joel	Konvansyon Inite Demokratik	51	0.66		
None of the above		43	0.55	21	0.24
Total		7,760	100.00	8,708	100.00
Valid votes		7,760	88.69	8,708	93.24
Invalid/blank votes		990	11.31	631	6.76
Total votes		8,750	100.00	9,339	100.00

Savanette/Quartier Baptiste
Candidate	Party	First round 9 August 2015		First round rerun 25 October 2015		Second round 20 November 2016	
Candidate	Party	Votes	%	Votes	%	Votes	%
Alexandre Guerda Bellevue Benjamin	Ansanm Patriyot pou Lavni Ayiti	126	15.89	1,825	40.69	2,244	51.92
Duperme Dieunoit	Struggling People's Organization	230	29.00	1,039	23.17	2,071	47.92
Figaro Jean-Ford Gorny	Mouvement National des Citoyens	175	22.07	754	16.81		
Noel Jean Romy	Kombit Travaye Peyizan pou Libere Ayiti	86	10.84	558	12.44		
Belfort Jeantes Belfort	Fusion of Haitian Social Democrats	6	0.76	251	5.60		
Dorleus Gergot	Renmen Ayiti	165	20.81				
None of the above		5	0.63	58	1.29	7	0.16
Total		793	100.00	4,485	100.00	4,322	100.00
Valid votes		793	83.92	4,485	89.95	4,322	88.82
Invalid/blank votes		152	16.08	501	10.05	544	11.18
Total votes		945	100.00	4,986	100.00	4,866	100.00

Thomassique
Candidate	Party	First round 9 August 2015		Second round 25 October 2015	
Candidate	Party	Votes	%	Votes	%
Delacruz Francisque	Konvansyon Inite Demokratik	2,936	33.07	6,777	59.71
Dorestil Nicson	Vérité	2,703	30.44	4,567	40.24
Pierre Jacky C.	Fusion of Haitian Social Democrats	1,689	19.02		
Peralte Marin	Reseau National Bouclier	1,141	12.85		
Etienne Marino	REKLAM	275	3.10		
Raphael Maxi	Fanmi Lavalas	87	0.98		
Doucet Jean Walner	Haiti in Action	36	0.41		
None of the above		12	0.14	6	0.05
Total		8,879	100.00	11,350	100.00
Valid votes		8,879	96.94	11,350	99.09
Invalid/blank votes		280	3.06	104	0.91
Total votes		9,159	100.00	11,454	100.00

Thomonde
Candidate	Party	First round 9 August 2015		Second round 25 October 2015	
Candidate	Party	Votes	%	Votes	%
Appolon Enel	Platfòm Pitit Desalin	2,618	36.29	4,933	53.50
Jean Souverne Delvard	Haitian Tèt Kale Party	1,732	24.01	4,191	45.46
Casseus Ernst	Konbit pou Ayiti	761	10.55		
Bernadeau Marie Denise	Reseau National Bouclier	637	8.83		
Dorisca Aldago	Kombit Travaye Peyizan pou Libere Ayiti	622	8.62		
Monpremier Kelly Jean Junior	Struggling People's Organization	359	4.98		
Cassagnol Ronald	Fanmi Lavalas	290	4.02		
Belizaire Elo	Fusion of Haitian Social Democrats	175	2.43		
None of the above		21	0.29	96	1.04
Total		7,215	100.00	9,220	100.00
Valid votes		7,215	95.00	9,220	99.03
Invalid/blank votes		380	5.00	90	0.97
Total votes		7,595	100.00	9,310	100.00

Election results by constituency in Grand'Anse

Abricots/Bonbon
Candidate	Party	First round 9 August 2015		Second round 25 October 2015	
Candidate	Party	Votes	%	Votes	%
Belizaire Jean Rigaud	Struggling People's Organization	4,194	37.40	4,458	50.64
Clerjour Jean Chavenet	Haitian Tèt Kale Party	2,352	20.98	4,325	49.13
St Fleur Jean Hansler	Renmen Ayiti	998	8.90		
Polycarpe Jean Arthur	Kombit Travaye Peyizan pou Libere Ayiti	943	8.41		
Luma Jean Lifranc	Platfòm Pitit Desalin	898	8.01		
Michaud Pierre Lesly	Inite Patriyotik	473	4.22		
Etienne Geffrard	Vérité	418	3.73		
Cazeneuve Jean Venel	Fusion of Haitian Social Democrats	227	2.02		
Denis Jean Ledouen	Pati Politik Fanm ak Fanmi	171	1.53		
Lucien Jean Monode	Fanmi Lavalas	168	1.50		
Neptune Jean Gerald Patrice	Konvansyon Inite Demokratik	140	1.25		
Paulin Jean Dominique	Delivrans	72	0.64		
Alcindor Jean Midol	UNIR-AYITI INI	59	0.53		
Charles Jean Wilgins	Rassemblement des Nationaux Démocrates Volontaires pour l'Unité Salvatrice	52	0.46		
None of the above		48	0.43	21	0.24
Total		11,213	100.00	8,804	100.00
Valid votes		11,213	92.73	8,804	97.79
Invalid/blank votes		879	7.27	199	2.21
Total votes		12,092	100.00	9,003	100.00

Anse-d'Hainault/Les Irois
Candidate	Party	First round 9 August 2015		Second round 25 October 2015	
Candidate	Party	Votes	%	Votes	%
Joachim Orelien	Inite Patriyotik	3,115	37.11	5,837	44.34
Semerzier Joel	Haitian Tèt Kale Party	2,754	32.81	7,061	53.63
Caton Kechner	Respect	2,078	24.76		
Jean Jocelyn	Alternative League for Haitian Progress and Emancipation	251	2.99		
Zamor Lolince	Renmen Ayiti	97	1.16		
Beaubrun Lebe	Fanmi Lavalas	42	0.50		
Lundy Saindy	Platfòm Pitit Desalin	31	0.37		
None of the above		25	0.30	267	2.03
Total		8,393	100.00	13,165	100.00
Valid votes		8,393	91.42	13,165	95.48
Invalid/blank votes		788	8.58	623	4.52
Total votes		9,181	100.00	13,788	100.00

Beaumon 9 August 2015
Candidate	Party	Votes	%
Bernard Anouce Jhon	Haitian Tèt Kale Party	2,275	51.52
Josyl Frantz	Vérité	1,158	26.22
Andre Marc Daniel	Platfòm Peyizan	929	21.04
None of the above		54	1.22
Total		4,416	100.00
Valid votes		4,416	87.53
Invalid/blank votes		629	12.47
Total votes		5,045	100.00

Corail
Candidate	Party	First round 9 August 2015		Second round 25 October 2015	
Candidate	Party	Votes	%	Votes	%
Papillon Rolphe	Consortium National des Partis Politiques Haïtiens	1,742	43.13	2,436	56.97
Victor Ronald	Haitian Tèt Kale Party	1,255	31.07	1,829	42.77
Decosse Joseph Nicolas	Fusion of Haitian Social Democrats	700	17.33		
Marc Jean Ernio	Fanmi Lavalas	102	2.53		
Wesh Adrien	Konvansyon Inite Demokratik	89	2.20		
Laurent James	Vérité	63	1.56		
Nelson Josué	Reseau National Bouclier	40	0.99		
None of the above		48	1.19	11	0.26
Total		4,039	100.00	4,276	100.00
Valid votes		4,039	91.98	4,276	96.48
Invalid/blank votes		352	8.02	156	3.52
Total votes		4,391	100.00	4,432	100.00

Dame-Marie
Candidate	Party	First round 9 August 2015		Second round 25 October 2015	
Candidate	Party	Votes	%	Votes	%
Louis Jeune Jean Acklush	Struggling People's Organization	2,258	27.68	3,818	39.20
Loiseau Curolo	Inite Patriyotik	1,979	24.26	5,899	60.56
Simeon Viaud	Consortium National des Partis Politiques Haïtiens	1,750	21.45		
Desmornes Josenor	Fusion of Haitian Social Democrats	776	9.51		
Pierre Fritz	Konvansyon Inite Demokratik	756	9.27		
Passe Louine	Renmen Ayiti	341	4.18		
Price Desrosiers	Haitian Tèt Kale Party	233	2.86		
None of the above		64	0.78	24	0.25
Total		8,157	100.00	9,741	100.00
Valid votes		8,157	92.19	9,741	96.93
Invalid/blank votes		691	7.81	309	3.07
Total votes		8,848	100.00	10,050	100.00

Jeremie
Candidate	Party	First round 9 August 2015		First round rerun 25 October 2015		Second round 20 November 2016	
Candidate	Party	Votes	%	Votes	%	Votes	%
Lorreus Jean Gustave	Consortium National des Partis Politiques Haïtiens	1,931	23.13	3,457	17.42	7,192	45.52
Lundy St Jean Marie Gladice	Reseau National Bouclier	665	7.97	3,175	16.00	8,423	53.31
Casseus Vincent	Alternative League for Haitian Progress and Emancipation	1,831	21.94	3,056	15.40		
Germain Dorsainvil	Haitian Tèt Kale Party	836	10.02	2,958	14.90		
Joseph Wilky	Struggling People's Organization	729	8.73	1,921	9.68		
Pleteau Larousse	Konvansyon Inite Demokratik	490	5.87	1,065	5.37		
Ysidor Joseph Mercier	Entente Nationale des Travailleurs pour le Reveil d'Haïti	88	1.05	1,057	5.33		
Wesh Mirdrine	Union Nationale des Démocrates Haïtiens	245	2.94	823	4.15		
Rene Marie Lennsa	Haiti in Action	257	3.08	397	2.00		
Antoine Marcel Joseph	Renmen Ayiti	146	1.75	390	1.97		
Laforest Jean Rupert	Inite Patriyotik	275	3.29	366	1.84		
Boyer Dukerson	Fanmi Lavalas	163	1.95	293	1.48		
Bassinet Marie Rochelle Daniella	Mouvement Patriotique Populaire Dessalinien	110	1.32	193	0.97		
Dorvilier Marcel Junior	Platfòm Pitit Desalin	73	0.87	175	0.88		
Desroches Arthur Moreau	Vérité	103	1.23	141	0.71		
Charles Jean Fedy	Fusion of Haitian Social Democrats	140	1.68	82	0.41		
Joseph Romain Igor	Force Démocratique Haïtien Intégré	45	0.54	60	0.30		
Justin Edwin	Pati Politik Fanm ak Fanmi	31	0.37	57	0.29		
Mars Bontemps	UNIR-AYITI INI	115	1.38	24	0.12		
None of the above		74	0.89	157	0.79	186	1.18
Total		8,347	100.00	19,847	100.00	15,801	100.00
Valid votes		8,347	92.58	19,847	94.26	15,801	93.60
Invalid/blank votes		669	7.42	1,209	5.74	1,081	6.40
Total votes		9,016	100.00	21,056	100.00	16,882	100.00

Moron/Chambellan
Candidate	Party	First round 9 August 2015		Second round 25 October 2015	
Candidate	Party	Votes	%	Votes	%
Benoit Jean Guerrier	Inite Patriyotik	2,727	33.09	5,232	54.03
Similien Pierre Donique	Fanmi Lavalas	1,345	16.32	4,372	45.15
Pierre-Louis Pierre Lamothe	Haitian Tèt Kale Party	1,234	14.98		
Florestal Jean Franky	Struggling People's Organization	1,170	14.20		
Chevalier Vidal	Fusion of Haitian Social Democrats	1,141	13.85		
Jean-Philippe Ramon's Claude	Vérité	496	6.02		
Charles Westerline	Mouvement Patriotique Populaire Dessalinien	101	1.23		
None of the above		26	0.32	80	0.83
Total		8,240	100.00	9,684	100.00
Valid votes		8,240	91.60	9,684	94.94
Invalid/blank votes		756	8.40	516	5.06
Total votes		8,996	100.00	10,200	100.00

Pestel
Candidate	Party	First round 9 August 2015		First round rerun 25 October 2015	
Candidate	Party	Votes	%	Votes	%
Etienne Ronald	Consortium National des Partis Politiques Haïtiens	2,656	42.62	3,866	49.19
Bien-Aime Antime	Fanmi Lavalas	1,085	17.41	1,175	14.95
Papillon Ertha Clercidor	Inite Patriyotik	467	7.49	1,039	13.22
Janvier Auriol	Alternative League for Haitian Progress and Emancipation	711	11.41	747	9.51
Dorlus Robinson	Reseau National Bouclier	182	2.92	409	5.20
Chery Ozandieu	Pati Politik Fanm ak Fanmi	239	3.84	260	3.31
Semerzier Jean-Luc	Mouvement Patriotique Populaire Dessalinien	137	2.20	147	1.87
Bernard Vanel	Socialist Action Movement	147	2.36	76	0.97
Renois Verdy	UNIR-AYITI INI	201	3.23	64	0.81
Marcelin Smith	Struggling People's Organization	381	6.11	50	0.64
None of the above		26	0.42	26	0.33
Total		6,232	100.00	7,859	100.00
Valid votes		6,232	94.27	7,859	96.24
Invalid/blank votes		379	5.73	307	3.76
Total votes		6,611	100.00	8,166	100.00

Roseaux
Candidate	Party	First round 9 August 2015		First round rerun 25 October 2015		Second round 29 January 2017	
Candidate	Party	Votes	%	Votes	%	Votes	%
Clerie David Nicolas	Haitian Tèt Kale Party	1,104	21.79	1,896	28.08	2,476	49.45
Toussaint Ronald	Inite Patriyotik	1,127	22.25	1,768	26.18	2,519	50.31
Joassaint Jean Canes	Fanmi Lavalas	599	11.82	1,259	18.64		
Germain Jean Alix	Reseau National Bouclier	384	7.58	1,012	14.99		
Nazaire Louisiane	Kombit Travaye Peyizan pou Libere Ayiti	414	8.17	364	5.39		
Jean Louis Manoucheka	Konvansyon Inite Demokratik	118	2.33	110	1.63		
St. Juste Jean Junel	Platfòm Pitit Desalin	191	3.77	108	1.60		
Lindor Marie Edline	Vérité	74	1.46	104	1.54		
Duvert Nossa	Ansanm Patriyot pou Lavni Ayiti	85	1.68	23	0.34		
Auguste Carmikelle Anne Mendjie	Renmen Ayiti	263	5.19	22	0.33		
Pierre Daryl	Struggling People's Organization	178	3.51	22	0.33		
Bernard Lenor	Front Uni pour la Renaissance d'Haïti	369	7.28	15	0.22		
Azard Jean Carlot	UNIR-AYITI INI	37	0.73	14	0.21		
Samedy Daniel	Pati Politik Fanm ak Fanmi	93	1.84	9	0.13		
None of the above		30	0.59	27	0.40	12	0.24
Total		5,066	100.00	6,753	100.00	5,007	100.00
Valid votes		5,066	91.79	6,753	92.72	5,007	94.88
Invalid/blank votes		453	8.21	530	7.28	270	5.12
Total votes		5,519	100.00	7,283	100.00	5,277	100.00

Election results by constituency in Nippes

Anse-A-Veau/Arnaud
Candidate	Party	First round 9 August 2015		Second round 25 October 2015	
Candidate	Party	Votes	%	Votes	%
Guervil Wilner	Haitian Tèt Kale Party	2,219	23.29	5,486	57.08
Foresmy Eddy	Vérité	1,326	13.92	4,066	42.31
Lyndor Moise	Haiti in Action	1,082	11.35		
Hubert Kems Etzer	Konvansyon Inite Demokratik	869	9.12		
St Cyr Ulrick	Fanmi Lavalas	789	8.28		
Monde Frantz Robert	Pont	674	7.07		
Saint Cyr Jean Alex	Renmen Ayiti	658	6.91		
Saintil Gimmy Williams	Platfòm Peyizan	579	6.08		
Sainvil Bony	Socialist Action Movement	522	5.48		
Jean Yves Junior Patrick	Reseau National Bouclier	183	1.92		
Cassmajor Gerard	Fusion of Haitian Social Democrats	147	1.54		
Fequiere Jean Roberce	Alternative League for Haitian Progress and Emancipation	109	1.14		
Vilmenay Jean Francois	Mouvement Patriotique Populaire Dessalinien	107	1.12		
Eustache Ronald	Platfòm Pitit Desalin	56	0.59		
None of the above		209	2.19	59	0.61
Total		9,529	100.00	9,611	100.00
Valid votes		9,529	87.25	9,611	92.78
Invalid/blank votes		1,392	12.75	748	7.22
Total votes		10,921	100.00	10,359	100.00

Baraderes/Grand Boucan
Candidate	Party	First round 9 August 2015		Second round 25 October 2015	
Candidate	Party	Votes	%	Votes	%
Borgelin Briere	Alternative League for Haitian Progress and Emancipation	1,035	17.49	3,857	49.97
Norzeus Patrick	Fanmi Lavalas	957	16.17	3,734	48.37
Besson Casimir Loraine	Struggling People's Organization	852	14.40		
Delvois Lawens	Konvansyon Inite Demokratik	837	14.14		
Exy Wester	Vérité	542	9.16		
Jean Charles Robert	Pont	449	7.59		
Lominy Bredy	Socialist Action Movement	444	7.50		
Royer Macelaine Robuste	Fusion of Haitian Social Democrats	293	4.95		
Pierre Levasson	Inite Patriyotik	258	4.36		
Cadet Wenel	Christian Movement for a New Haiti	183	3.09		
None of the above		68	1.15	128	1.66
Total		5,918	100.00	7,719	100.00
Valid votes		5,918	86.52	7,719	90.14
Invalid/blank votes		922	13.48	844	9.86
Total votes		6,840	100.00	8,563	100.00

Fonds Des Negres
Candidate	Party	First round 9 August 2015		Second round 25 October 2015	
Candidate	Party	Votes	%	Votes	%
Guerrier Iverno	Socialist Action Movement	1,363	15.87	6,310	62.89
Faustin Poly	Fanmi Lavalas	1,339	15.59	3,653	36.41
Tropnas Wilfrid	Christian National Union for the Reconstruction of Haiti	1,103	12.84		
Ramilus Boson	Renmen Ayiti	765	8.90		
Detournel Yvenel	Mouvement National des Citoyens	628	7.31		
Bazile Pierre Marie	Retabli Ayiti	622	7.24		
Gaspard Joseph	Mouvement Patriotique Populaire Dessalinien	578	6.73		
Laurent Jadothe	Struggling People's Organization	511	5.95		
Estilus Alize	Vérité	497	5.79		
Dupont Rejonal	Reseau National Bouclier	408	4.75		
Larochelle Marie Carmelle	Ansanm Patriyot pou Lavni Ayiti	289	3.36		
Mystal Iljois	CANAAN	213	2.48		
Jean Baptiste Nelson	PPG18	209	2.43		
None of the above		66	0.77	71	0.71
Total		8,591	100.00	10,034	100.00
Valid votes		8,591	91.70	10,034	93.60
Invalid/blank votes		778	8.30	686	6.40
Total votes		9,369	100.00	10,720	100.00

L'Asile
Candidate	Party	First round 9 August 2015		Second round 25 October 2015	
Candidate	Party	Votes	%	Votes	%
Premier Lemann	Fusion of Haitian Social Democrats	1,943	24.12	4,841	56.49
Delia Frantz	Christian National Union for the Reconstruction of Haiti	1,552	19.26	3,708	43.27
Francis Jean Damas	Haiti in Action	1,275	15.82		
Celestin Maxo	Kombit Travaye Peyizan pou Libere Ayiti	1,095	13.59		
Toyo Frantz	Pont	772	9.58		
Rejouis Florence	Konvansyon Inite Demokratik	282	3.50		
Rejouis Diony	Platfòm Pitit Desalin	214	2.66		
Joseph Fred	Fanmi Lavalas	197	2.45		
Liberte Florvil	Ansanm Patriyot pou Lavni Ayiti	163	2.02		
Dorval Rachelle	Vérité	132	1.64		
Petit Celin Jean Michelet	Renmen Ayiti	101	1.25		
Valcin Jean Elie	Parti pour la Libération des Masses et d'Intégration Sociale	79	0.98		
Lafleur Joachin	Platfòm Peyizan	65	0.81		
Decembre Toniel	PPG18	64	0.79		
Gassant Serge	Struggling People's Organization	14	0.17		
None of the above		109	1.35	20	0.23
Total		8,057	100.00	8,569	100.00
Valid votes		8,057	90.53	8,569	94.47
Invalid/blank votes		843	9.47	502	5.53
Total votes		8,900	100.00	9,071	100.00

Miragoane
Candidate	Party	First round 9 August 2015		Second round 25 October 2015	
Candidate	Party	Votes	%	Votes	%
Geste Yvon	Haitian Tèt Kale Party	3,596	30.13	9,884	66.09
Pierre Mikerlange	Konvansyon Inite Demokratik	1,372	11.49	4,921	32.91
Louima Ulfred	Fanmi Lavalas	1,256	10.52		
Joachim Colin	Pont	1,149	9.63		
Pierre Louis Jean Joseph	Struggling People's Organization	893	7.48		
Compere Washington	Rapwoche	793	6.64		
Cadet Bernard	Alternative League for Haitian Progress and Emancipation	707	5.92		
Mathurin Jean Baptiste Pierre	Platfòm Pitit Desalin	669	5.60		
Boucher Sonny	Vérité	488	4.09		
Registre Metischlah	Renmen Ayiti	355	2.97		
Dorcely Carlo	Kombit Travaye Peyizan pou Libere Ayiti	318	2.66		
Jocelyn Hanscico	Haiti in Action	197	1.65		
Henry Jhaezz Whaesell Paethruss	KONFYANS	47	0.39		
None of the above		96	0.80	150	1.00
Total		11,936	100.00	14,955	100.00
Valid votes		11,936	91.34	14,955	92.71
Invalid/blank votes		1,132	8.66	1,176	7.29
Total votes		13,068	100.00	16,131	100.00

Petit Trou De Nippes/Plaisance Du Sud
Candidate	Party	First round 9 August 2015		Second round 25 October 2015	
Candidate	Party	Votes	%	Votes	%
Guillaume Claude Luc	Renmen Ayiti	3,426	37.47	6,250	56.21
Pierre Lubern	Haitian Tèt Kale Party	2,899	31.71		
Jean-Marie Liphete	Pont	1,086	11.88	4,804	43.21
Rosena Jean-Brunel	Vérité	838	9.17		
Durocher Dieuseul	Platfòm Peyizan	669	7.32		
Opont Alain	Respect	156	1.71		
Deshommes Bruno	Union des Patriotes pour l'Avancement National	38	0.42		
None of the above		31	0.34	65	0.58
Total		9,143	100.00	11,119	100.00
Valid votes		9,143	88.84	11,119	93.41
Invalid/blank votes		1,148	11.16	784	6.59
Total votes		10,291	100.00	11,903	100.00

Petite Riviere De Nippes/Paillant
Candidate	Party	First round 9 August 2015		Second round 25 October 2015	
Candidate	Party	Votes	%	Votes	%
Laurore Edouard	Vérité	2,498	26.96	6,092	49.24
Mathurin Smith	Fanmi Lavalas	1,671	18.03	6,182	49.96
Sterling Jules Andre	Platfòm Pitit Desalin	1,262	13.62		
Laguerre Arnold	Haiti in Action	1,214	13.10		
Filocsaint Ulrick	Haitian Tèt Kale Party	1,196	12.91		
Leconte Capiteau	Fusion of Haitian Social Democrats	494	5.33		
Cherette Junior	Struggling People's Organization	355	3.83		
Pierre Nickel	Renmen Ayiti	304	3.28		
Pierre Louis Wilson	PPG18	168	1.81		
Dorisca Lesly	MOPANOU	49	0.53		
None of the above		55	0.59	99	0.80
Total		9,266	100.00	12,373	100.00
Valid votes		9,266	88.53	12,373	92.17
Invalid/blank votes		1,200	11.47	1,051	7.83
Total votes		10,466	100.00	13,424	100.00

Election results by constituency in Nord

Acul Du Nord
Candidate	Party	First round 9 August 2015		First round rerun 25 October 2015		Second round 20 November 2016	
Candidate	Party	Votes	%	Votes	%	Votes	%
Milfort Henry Junior Henrilo	Vérité	503	8.86	2,136	15.58	4,091	45.75
Charles Rodney	Platfòm Pitit Desalin	459	8.08	1,852	13.51	4,808	53.76
Michel Jobes Jolicaire	Haitian Tèt Kale Party	645	11.36	1,833	13.37		
Verne Lorius Jean	National Christian Party of Haiti	345	6.07	1,727	12.60		
Floréal Bendjy	Reseau National Bouclier	694	12.22	1,658	12.09		
Milord Pedro	Pont	618	10.88	1,036	7.56		
Paul Pierre Hugo R.	Fusion of Haitian Social Democrats	381	6.71	843	6.15		
Abraham Dony	Platfòm Leve Kanpe	389	6.85	759	5.54		
Floreal Cineus	Mouvement Progressiste pour l'Avancement des Masses	392	6.90	620	4.52		
Pierre Guesly	Struggling People's Organization	227	4.00	320	2.33		
Aleandre Polin	Consortium National des Partis Politiques Haïtiens	276	4.86	317	2.31		
Derosin Charlemagne Pierre	Fanmi Lavalas	297	5.23	259	1.89		
Ocius Saint Amand Adrien	Konvansyon Inite Demokratik	84	1.48	165	1.20		
Augustin Maxilien	Mouvement National des Citoyens	96	1.69	76	0.55		
Bolivar Austel	Mouvement Patriotique Populaire Dessalinien	17	0.30	44	0.32		
Edmond Wilkine Joseph	Christian Movement for a New Haiti	142	2.50	18	0.13		
Telcide Gesnere	Organisation Pour l'Avancement d'Haïti et des Haïtiens	75	1.32	17	0.12		
Castille Jean Yves	Alternative League for Haitian Progress and Emancipation	22	0.39	16	0.12		
None of the above		18	0.32	13	0.09	44	0.49
Total		5,680	100.00	13,709	100.00	8,943	100.00
Valid votes		5,680	96.09	13,709	97.41	8,943	50.00
Invalid/blank votes		231	3.91	364	2.59	8,943	50.00
Total votes		5,911	100.00	14,073	100.00	17,886	100.00

Borgne
Candidate	Party	First round 9 August 2015		Second round 25 October 2015	
Candidate	Party	Votes	%	Votes	%
Faustin Jude	Haitian Tèt Kale Party	2,782	40.97	2,479	50.15
Saint-Jean Gerard	Vérité	2,304	33.93	2,418	48.92
Janvier Reynald	Fusion of Haitian Social Democrats	406	5.98		
Charles Delivrance Sonel	Respect	341	5.02		
Hyppolite Gilbert	Struggling People's Organization	254	3.74		
Francois Dely Dieudonne	Pont	140	2.06		
Saurel Prenise	Platfòm Pitit Desalin	129	1.90		
Jadotte Pierre Richard T.	Fanmi Lavalas	94	1.38		
Charite Joseph	Alliance Démocratique pour la Reconciliation Nationale	85	1.25		
Davilmar Joachin Jose	Renmen Ayiti	76	1.12		
Predestin Fedrick	Inite Patriyotik	64	0.94		
None of the above		115	1.69	46	0.93
Total		6,790	100.00	4,943	100.00
Valid votes		6,790	92.08	4,943	97.57
Invalid/blank votes		584	7.92	123	2.43
Total votes		7,374	100.00	5,066	100.00

Cap-Haitien
Candidate	Party	First round 9 August 2015		Second round 25 October 2015	
Candidate	Party	Votes	%	Votes	%
Etienne Jean	Alternative League for Haitian Progress and Emancipation	3,817	18.67	23,012	56.11
Jean-Pierre Eddy	Fanmi Lavalas	1,465	7.17	17,291	42.16
Desir Rene	Haitian Tèt Kale Party	1,114	5.45		
Joseph Rene Junior	Platfòm Pitit Desalin	1,051	5.14		
Robert Youzelande Etienne	Fusion of Haitian Social Democrats	966	4.73		
Adrien Pascal	Socialist Action Movement	920	4.50		
Celestin Carry Lemercier	Consortium National des Partis Politiques Haïtiens	775	3.79		
Mesamours Herns	Renmen Ayiti	697	3.41		
Senatus Eric	Respect	656	3.21		
Jules Ronald	Konvansyon Inite Demokratik	644	3.15		
Duval Rostigny	Struggling People's Organization	575	2.81		
Prince Jacquelin	Pont	479	2.34		
Jean-Bernard Stanley Karly	Aksyon pou Konstwi yon Ayiti Oganize	452	2.21		
Altidor David	Christian Movement for a New Haiti	451	2.21		
Etienne Nadege Rebecca	Rapwoche	449	2.20		
Joseph Johnny	Vérité	431	2.11		
Bernardin Bendy	Haiti in Action	429	2.10		
Doreus Kesmy	Entente Nationale des Travailleurs pour le Reveil d'Haïti	423	2.07		
Mathurin Havelt Honor	Organisation Pour l'Avancement d'Haïti et des Haïtiens	404	1.98		
Beliard Jean Farell	Konbit pou Ayiti	403	1.97		
Desauguste Jean Jul	UNIR-AYITI INI	397	1.94		
Veus Fritz	Mouvement Patriotique Populaire Dessalinien	360	1.76		
Joseph Nick	Alliance Démocratique pour la Reconciliation Nationale	324	1.58		
Blaise Islan	Kombit Travaye Peyizan pou Libere Ayiti	316	1.55		
Paul Jocelyn	PPG18	314	1.54		
Jean-Pierre Guerphry	Haitian United Socialist Party	256	1.25		
Bernadotte Eddy	ATERI	240	1.17		
Mezadieu Bruno	Plateforme Jistis	238	1.16		
Louis Antonio	Inite Patriyotik	236	1.15		
Antoine Renel	Nouvelle Haïti	230	1.13		
Mesamours Cardyn	Concorde Nationale	192	0.94		
Evariste Marc Edwige	Force Unite Nationale	158	0.77		
Fatal Esther	SOLUTION	157	0.77		
Dorsainvil Pierre Denis	Mouvement National Haïtien	117	0.57		
Gabriel Eddy	Mouvement pour l'Instauration de la Démocratie en Haïti	108	0.53		
Louis Ostain	Parti de la Diaspora Haïtienne pour Haïti	41	0.20		
None of the above		159	0.78	711	1.73
Total		20,444	100.00	41,014	100.00
Valid votes		20,444	95.88	41,014	94.89
Invalid/blank votes		879	4.12	2,207	5.11
Total votes		21,323	100.00	43,221	100.00

Dondon
Candidate	Party	First round 9 August 2015		First round rerun 25 October 2015		Second round 20 November 2016	
Candidate	Party	Votes	%	Votes	%	Votes	%
Daniel Hermogene	Fusion of Haitian Social Democrats	414	33.63	1,561	26.73	2,529	54.29
Chery Harrold	Haitian Tèt Kale Party	192	15.60	1,221	20.91	2,116	45.43
Celicourt Jean Felix	Respect	19	1.54	674	11.54		
Chery Pierre Antoine	Platfòm Pitit Desalin	181	14.70	544	9.32		
Célicourt Ronald	Konvansyon Inite Demokratik	124	10.07	468	8.01		
Francois Hilaire	Struggling People's Organization	31	2.52	443	7.59		
Saint-Fleur Pascal	Vérité	131	10.64	331	5.67		
Toussaint Ronald	Pont	75	6.09	309	5.29		
Elveus Stephen	Mouvement National des Citoyens	25	2.03	174	2.98		
Desamours Pierre Yves	Entente Nationale des Travailleurs pour le Reveil d'Haïti	9	0.73	19	0.33		
Time Quesner	PPG18	5	0.41	19	0.33		
None of the above		25	2.03	77	1.32	13	0.28
Total		1,231	100.00	5,840	100.00	4,658	100.00
Valid votes		1,231	97.93	5,840	96.27	4,658	97.14
Invalid/blank votes		26	2.07	226	3.73	137	2.86
Total votes		1,257	100.00	6,066	100.00	4,795	100.00

Grande Riviere Du Nord/Bahon
Candidate	Party	First round 9 August 2015		First round rerun 25 October 2015		Second round 20 November 2016	
Candidate	Party	Votes	%	Votes	%	Votes	%
Julmice Jacques	Vérité	2,318	38.62	6,933	47.41	6,565	55.27
Benjamin Ocinjac	Haitian Tèt Kale Party	2,401	40.00	5,666	38.74	5,268	44.35
Justafort Coulange	Konsyans Patriyotik	726	12.10	1,439	9.84		
Jasmin Jean Herve	Inite Patriyotik	77	1.28	214	1.46		
Joseph Mirlin	Alternative League for Haitian Progress and Emancipation	127	2.12	82	0.56		
Pierre Sony	Konvansyon Inite Demokratik	58	0.97	73	0.50		
Monereau Florcie	Platfòm Pitit Desalin	69	1.15	70	0.48		
Pierre Emmanuel	Fanmi Lavalas	49	0.82	47	0.32		
Siriack Danio	Struggling People's Organization	52	0.87	25	0.17		
Devalcin Renand	Pont	49	0.82	21	0.14		
Augustin Emmanuel	Fusion of Haitian Social Democrats	38	0.63	12	0.08		
Compere Jean Praxede	Ansanm Patriyot pou Lavni Ayiti	20	0.33	12	0.08		
None of the above		18	0.30	30	0.21	46	0.39
Total		6,002	100.00	14,624	100.00	11,879	100.00
Valid votes		6,002	94.76	14,624	97.54	11,879	97.01
Invalid/blank votes		332	5.24	369	2.46	366	2.99
Total votes		6,334	100.00	14,993	100.00	12,245	100.00

Limbe
Candidate	Party	First round 9 August 2015		Second round 25 October 2015	
Candidate	Party	Votes	%	Votes	%
Louis Frandy	Vérité	5,611	36.38	10,733	49.55
Bruno Joseph F. Firmin Jr	Alternative League for Haitian Progress and Emancipation	2,461	15.96	10,847	50.07
Gédéon William	Reseau National Bouclier	2,340	15.17		
Brinvert Jonguel	Platfòm Leve Kanpe	2,252	14.60		
Obas Parice	Fanmi Lavalas	870	5.64		
Francois Wendell	Struggling People's Organization	795	5.15		
Pierre Jean Pedro	Nouvelle Haïti	212	1.37		
Nelson Lyns	Fusion of Haitian Social Democrats	196	1.27		
Sylvain Samuel	National Christian Party of Haiti	184	1.19		
Nicanord Myrtho	Platfòm Pitit Desalin	177	1.15		
Joseph Michel	Pati Kreyol Nou Ye	143	0.93		
Francois Ronald	Plateforme Jistis	47	0.30		
Wesny Paul	Mouvement pour l'Instauration de la Démocratie en Haïti	41	0.27		
Laguerre Jean Felit	Inite Patriyotik	36	0.23		
Anilus Lyma Viscamar	Haitian Republican Party	20	0.13		
Nesly Leonvil	Rapwoche	18	0.12		
None of the above		20	0.13	82	0.38
Total		15,423	100.00	21,662	100.00
Valid votes		15,423	97.87	21,662	98.10
Invalid/blank votes		336	2.13	420	1.90
Total votes		15,759	100.00	22,082	100.00

Limonade
Candidate	Party	First round 9 August 2015		Second round 25 October 2015	
Candidate	Party	Votes	%	Votes	%
Tanis Tertius	Kombit Travaye Peyizan pou Libere Ayiti	2,714	34.47	3,237	51.36
Theophile Gluck	Vérité	2,037	25.87	3,004	47.67
Etienne Fanfan	Platfòm Pitit Desalin	985	12.51		
Valcin Yves	Christian Movement for a New Haiti	885	11.24		
Mathurin Tony	Struggling People's Organization	269	3.42		
Dubois Calourdes Phenelus	Fusion of Haitian Social Democrats	243	3.09		
Préval Léonce	Reseau National Bouclier	223	2.83		
Zephirin Domius	Haitian Tèt Kale Party	186	2.36		
Jean Gerald	Pont	151	1.92		
Saint-Jean Yvenel	Renmen Ayiti	64	0.81		
Jean Francois Wismique	Inite Patriyotik	41	0.52		
Benjamin Emmanuel	Mouvement National des Citoyens	30	0.38		
None of the above		45	0.57	61	0.97
Total		7,873	100.00	6,302	100.00
Valid votes		7,873	94.14	6,302	96.29
Invalid/blank votes		490	5.86	243	3.71
Total votes		8,363	100.00	6,545	100.00

Pignon/Ranquitte/La Victoire
Candidate	Party	First round 9 August 2015		Second round 25 October 2015	
Candidate	Party	Votes	%	Votes	%
Nelson Hidson	Haitian Tèt Kale Party	5,131	41.81	8,285	46.10
Constantin Peter Castin	Vérité	4,468	36.41	9,622	53.54
Aimable Djail Covsky	Reseau National Bouclier	2,083	16.97		
Leurgiste Widnert	Ansanm Patriyot pou Lavni Ayiti	190	1.55		
Dieuvy Augustin	Parti de la Diaspora Haïtienne pour Haïti	143	1.17		
Pierre Louis Daniel	Struggling People's Organization	111	0.90		
Pierre Maxene	Respect	91	0.74		
None of the above		54	0.44	63	0.35
Total		12,271	100.00	17,970	100.00
Valid votes		12,271	94.46	17,970	97.41
Invalid/blank votes		720	5.54	477	2.59
Total votes		12,991	100.00	18,447	100.00

Pilate
Candidate	Party	First round 9 August 2015		Second round 25 October 2015	
Candidate	Party	Votes	%	Votes	%
Perilus Worms	Haitian Tèt Kale Party	2,059	29.26	4,038	45.46
Luciena Exil	Reseau National Bouclier	1,724	24.50	4,792	53.95
Delus Julia	Fusion of Haitian Social Democrats	663	9.42		
Ilfrene Wandy	Aksyon pou Konstwi yon Ayiti Oganize	600	8.53		
Marcelin Yvon	KONFYANS	415	5.90		
Despeigne Francine	Vérité	375	5.33		
Brutus Cacsman	Pont	356	5.06		
Francois Wedly	Konvansyon Inite Demokratik	338	4.80		
Smith Ifrene	Struggling People's Organization	119	1.69		
Demeus Edmond	Coalition pour la Convention de la Reconstruction de la Reconciliation des Citoyens Haïtiens	94	1.34		
Telfort Judlet	Alternative League for Haitian Progress and Emancipation	89	1.26		
Fils-Aime Guiddalthi	Fanmi Lavalas	76	1.08		
Marcelin Wilfrid	Renmen Ayiti	74	1.05		
Orelus Salva Joseph	Platfòm Peyizan	17	0.24		
None of the above		39	0.55	52	0.59
Total		7,038	100.00	8,882	100.00
Valid votes		7,038	89.33	8,882	95.20
Invalid/blank votes		841	10.67	448	4.80
Total votes		7,879	100.00	9,330	100.00

Plaine Du Nord/Milot
Candidate	Party	First round 9 August 2015		Second round 25 October 2015	
Candidate	Party	Votes	%	Votes	%
Pierre Claude Lesly	Reseau National Bouclier	2,538	22.28	10,456	59.29
Joseph Modeline	Platfòm Pitit Desalin	1,687	14.81	6,885	39.04
Pierre Rony	Consortium National des Partis Politiques Haïtiens	1,574	13.82		
Pierre Etienne Marie Jossie	Haitian Tèt Kale Party	1,488	13.06		
Odalberrt Phanuel	Pont	964	8.46		
Garçon Jean Eddy	Konvansyon Inite Demokratik	773	6.79		
Jean Pharuns Smith	Inite Patriyotik	535	4.70		
Salomon Alix	Mouvement Patriotique Populaire Dessalinien	373	3.27		
Mesidor Jhonson	Renmen Ayiti	357	3.13		
Mondesir David	Rapwoche	274	2.41		
Laguerre Fleming	Fusion of Haitian Social Democrats	188	1.65		
Ideus Antoine Stphora	Parti de la Diaspora Haïtienne pour Haïti	178	1.56		
Louis Evens	ATERI	144	1.26		
Justinien Guillaume Yanique	MRA	102	0.90		
Samson Arold	Respect	85	0.75		
None of the above		131	1.15	293	1.66
Total		11,391	100.00	17,634	100.00
Valid votes		11,391	94.77	17,634	95.77
Invalid/blank votes		629	5.23	778	4.23
Total votes		12,020	100.00	18,412	100.00

Plaisance
Candidate	Party	First round 9 August 2015		First round rerun 25 October 2015		Second round 20 November 2016	
Candidate	Party	Votes	%	Votes	%	Votes	%
Jean Baptiste Renaud	Haitian Tèt Kale Party	226	12.35	3,632	33.48	4,149	47.58
Alcide Audne	Vérité	123	6.72	3,163	29.16	4,554	52.22
Jeune Brunel	Christian Movement for a New Haiti	1,084	59.23	1,884	17.37		
Eugene Georges	Renmen Ayiti	61	3.33	1,325	12.21		
Pierre Walki	Alternative League for Haitian Progress and Emancipation	85	4.64	395	3.64		
Ducheine Franklin	Fanmi Lavalas	25	1.37	70	0.65		
Assène Guibert	Reseau National Bouclier	6	0.33	56	0.52		
Saint Hillien Guy Robert	Konbit Nasyonal	19	1.04	48	0.44		
Regis Patrick R.	Force Unite Nationale	20	1.09	47	0.43		
Joseph Louicius Polain	Consortium National des Partis Politiques Haïtiens	7	0.38	31	0.29		
Saint-Fleur Ronald	Struggling People's Organization	57	3.11	24	0.22		
Francois Norius	Konvansyon Inite Demokratik	42	2.30	22	0.20		
Jacques Jean Claude	Fusion of Haitian Social Democrats	17	0.93	20	0.18		
Saint-Jean Ornan	Kombit Travaye Peyizan pou Libere Ayiti	21	1.15	17	0.16		
Pierre Windel	Haiti in Action	12	0.66	11	0.10		
None of the above		25	1.37	103	0.95	17	0.19
Total		1,830	100.00	10,848	100.00	8,720	100.00
Valid votes		1,830	96.37	10,848	93.69	8,720	95.42
Invalid/blank votes		69	3.63	730	6.31	419	4.58
Total votes		1,899	100.00	11,578	100.00	9,139	100.00

Port Margot
Candidate	Party	First round 9 August 2015		First round rerun 25 October 2015		Second round 20 November 2016	
Candidate	Party	Votes	%	Votes	%	Votes	%
Fanfan Philome Hilaire	Haitian Tèt Kale Party	20	1.66	2,614	26.32	3,313	53.14
Joseph Tholeme S.	Platfòm Pitit Desalin	916	76.02	2,372	23.88	2,913	46.72
Charnel Théogène Virgile	Reseau National Bouclier	22	1.83	1,632	16.43		
Estimable Tonguy Joseph	Fusion of Haitian Social Democrats	2	0.17	1,081	10.88		
Paul Lemercier Eugene	Pont	14	1.16	898	9.04		
Deleazard Berilus	Vérité	147	12.20	304	3.06		
Romeus Eddy Emmanuel	CANAAN	32	2.66	304	3.06		
Jean-Cesar Meurice	Ansanm Patriyot pou Lavni Ayiti	4	0.33	298	3.00		
Jerome Jean Rony	Alternative League for Haitian Progress and Emancipation	9	0.75	296	2.98		
Fesias Felius Felix	National Christian Party of Haiti	13	1.08	46	0.46		
Valmir Manis Joseph	Struggling People's Organization	8	0.66	21	0.21		
Jean Augustin Miguel	Kombit Liberasyon Ekonomik	6	0.50	16	0.16		
Lucias Josue Joseph	Rapwoche	7	0.58	10	0.10		
Joseph Peguy Andre	Plan d'Action Citoyenne	4	0.33	7	0.07		
None of the above		1	0.08	34	0.34	9	0.14
Total		1,205	100.00	9,933	100.00	6,235	100.00
Valid votes		1,205	96.09	9,933	96.62	6,235	97.12
Invalid/blank votes		49	3.91	348	3.38	185	2.88
Total votes		1,254	100.00	10,281	100.00	6,420	100.00

Quartier Morin
Candidate	Party	First round 9 August 2015		Second round 25 October 2015	
Candidate	Party	Votes	%	Votes	%
Celestin Hugue	Platfòm Leve Kanpe	1,551	33.67	2,324	49.39
Prophete Esaie	Struggling People's Organization	980	21.27	2,334	49.61
Eugene Doucet	Consortium National des Partis Politiques Haïtiens	626	13.59		
Moncion Rose Carmelle	Haitian Tèt Kale Party	529	11.48		
Pierre Wilnick	Pont	386	8.38		
Theodore Evoy	Christian Movement for a New Haiti	221	4.80		
Eugene Claudy	Konvansyon Inite Demokratik	144	3.13		
Lacarte Jean-Claude	Vérité	89	1.93		
Louis Charles Michel	Haitian Republican Party	49	1.06		
None of the above		32	0.69	47	1.00
Total		4,607	100.00	4,705	100.00
Valid votes		4,607	95.96	4,705	97.25
Invalid/blank votes		194	4.04	133	2.75
Total votes		4,801	100.00	4,838	100.00

Saint Raphael
Candidate	Party	First round 9 August 2015		First round rerun 25 October 2015		Second round 20 November 2016	
Candidate	Party	Votes	%	Votes	%	Votes	%
Borgella Jean Wilfrid	Haitian Tèt Kale Party	1,975	39.54	4,078	44.90	4,622	59.09
Sissoir Bener	Platfòm Pitit Desalin	1,096	21.94	2,711	29.85	3,192	40.81
Lafrance Odilon	Vérité	460	9.21	875	9.63		
Pierre Martin	Renmen Ayiti	406	8.13	602	6.63		
Joseph Achille	Struggling People's Organization	581	11.63	541	5.96		
Jules Adelin	Plateforme Jistis	44	0.88	103	1.13		
Jean Francois Edoine	Fanmi Lavalas	101	2.02	71	0.78		
Belizaire Henriot	Ansanm Patriyot pou Lavni Ayiti	48	0.96	23	0.25		
Jean Modeline	Fusion of Haitian Social Democrats	58	1.16	18	0.20		
Orvil Luther Robert	Pont	42	0.84	17	0.19		
Beaubrun Lucny	Nouvelle Haïti	103	2.06	15	0.17		
Parisien Ruthman	Rassemblement des Nationaux Démocrates Volontaires pour l'Unité Salvatrice	67	1.34	9	0.10		
None of the above		14	0.28	19	0.21	8	0.10
Total		4,995	100.00	9,082	100.00	7,822	100.00
Valid votes		4,995	95.62	9,082	97.31	7,822	96.57
Invalid/blank votes		229	4.38	251	2.69	278	3.43
Total votes		5,224	100.00	9,333	100.00	8,100	100.00

Election results by constituency in Nord Est

Ferrier/Les Perches
Candidate	Party	First round 9 August 2015		Second round 25 October 2015	
Candidate	Party	Votes	%	Votes	%
Jean Gerald	Vérité	2,610	36.48	4,026	50.41
Petit-Frère Elience	Fanmi Lavalas	1,924	26.89	3,943	49.37
Richard Miguel	Fusion of Haitian Social Democrats	1,195	16.70		
Jean Josenie Ferdinand	Haitian Tèt Kale Party	433	6.05		
Saint Ruste Odin	Konvansyon Inite Demokratik	289	4.04		
Mompoint Emile	Ansanm Patriyot pou Lavni Ayiti	187	2.61		
Kercivil Mathieu Junior	Renmen Ayiti	101	1.41		
Louis Wiltes	Platfòm Pitit Desalin	97	1.36		
Denis Kedaly	Kombit Travaye Peyizan pou Libere Ayiti	91	1.27		
Pierre Louis-Mary	Reseau National Bouclier	85	1.19		
Jean-Baptiste Brunet	Respect	68	0.95		
Joseph Eliodor	Konsyans Patriyotik	37	0.52		
Philostin Wilderson	Socialist Action Movement	14	0.20		
None of the above		24	0.34	17	0.21
Total		7,155	100.00	7,986	100.00
Valid votes		7,155	94.31	7,986	96.51
Invalid/blank votes		432	5.69	289	3.49
Total votes		7,587	100.00	8,275	100.00

Fort-Liberte
Candidate	Party	First round 9 August 2015		Second round 25 October 2015	
Candidate	Party	Votes	%	Votes	%
Charles-Pierre Miolin	Fanmi Lavalas	2,420	22.77	5,825	46.05
Rubes Jacquelin	Konvansyon Inite Demokratik	1,659	15.61	6,807	53.81
Pierre David	Konsyans Patriyotik	1,286	12.10		
Lamothe Phenol	Haiti in Action	1,031	9.70		
Benoit Rolin	Reseau National Bouclier	1,002	9.43		
Pierre Guiteau	Pati Kreyol Nou Ye	600	5.65		
Brenord Louicius	Renmen Ayiti	590	5.55		
Dorsaint Jocelyn Emile	Mobilisation pour le Progrès d'Haïti	502	4.72		
Blaise Andy	Fusion of Haitian Social Democrats	478	4.50		
Manigat Joseph Alfred	Haitian Tèt Kale Party	433	4.07		
Charles Amos Junior	Vérité	239	2.25		
Cape Morales	Inite Patriyotik	143	1.35		
Davilmar Serge Fils	Concorde Nationale	112	1.05		
Dolciné Joel Francois	Kombit Travaye Peyizan pou Libere Ayiti	62	0.58		
Charles Pierre Rosenex	ATERI	48	0.45		
None of the above		23	0.22	18	0.14
Total		10,628	100.00	12,650	100.00
Valid votes		10,628	97.06	12,650	98.27
Invalid/blank votes		322	2.94	223	1.73
Total votes		10,950	100.00	12,873	100.00

Mombin Crochu
Candidate	Party	First round 9 August 2015		Second round 25 October 2015	
Candidate	Party	Votes	%	Votes	%
Saint Fleur Fils Aime Ignace	Reseau National Bouclier	1,348	25.25	2,010	32.42
St Louis Michel Jacques	Haitian Tèt Kale Party	1,300	24.35	4,162	67.13
Codio Luzette	Respect	1,184	22.18		
Accilus Erick	Vérité	1,088	20.38		
Phanord Phaustin	Struggling People's Organization	369	6.91		
None of the above		50	0.94	28	0.45
Total		5,339	100.00	6,200	100.00
Valid votes		5,339	92.64	6,200	98.77
Invalid/blank votes		424	7.36	77	1.23
Total votes		5,763	100.00	6,277	100.00

Mont-Organise/Capotille
Candidate	Party	First round 9 August 2015		Second round 25 October 2015	
Candidate	Party	Votes	%	Votes	%
Alphonse Willa	Haitian Tèt Kale Party	3,092	30.44	5,680	47.37
Adrien Frist	Konvansyon Inite Demokratik	2,893	28.48	6,204	51.74
Pierre Clement	Vérité	2,749	27.06		
Alfred Gelanes	Konsyans Patriyotik	945	9.30		
Jules Asnold	Renmen Ayiti	269	2.65		
None of the above		211	2.08	106	0.88
Total		10,159	100.00	11,990	100.00
Valid votes		10,159	94.34	11,990	97.58
Invalid/blank votes		610	5.66	297	2.42
Total votes		10,769	100.00	12,287	100.00

Ouanaminthe
Candidate	Party	First round 9 August 2015		Second round 25 October 2015	
Candidate	Party	Votes	%	Votes	%
Florvil Elisma	Haitian Tèt Kale Party	5,271	29.44	12,398	55.09
Fidèle Jean-Wisner	Reseau National Bouclier	3,770	21.06	9,761	43.38
Pierre Wideline	Ansanm Patriyot pou Lavni Ayiti	3,104	17.34		
Saintilma Joseph	Vérité	2,138	11.94		
Pierre Rony	Fusion of Haitian Social Democrats	1,557	8.70		
Montilus Venel	Konvansyon Inite Demokratik	1,072	5.99		
Jean Marc L'ange	Platfòm Pitit Desalin	371	2.07		
Exavier Lucien	Haitian Republican Party	129	0.72		
Raphael Jean Richard	Mouvement Independent Kitirel Social Economie ak Politik an Ayiti	122	0.68		
Pierre Eliphete	Pont	103	0.58		
Jean Baptiste Ronald	PPG18	71	0.40		
Pierre St-Agneau	Pati Kreyol Nou Ye	13	0.07		
None of the above		182	1.02	344	1.53
Total		17,903	100.00	22,503	100.00
Valid votes		17,903	96.84	22,503	97.08
Invalid/blank votes		584	3.16	676	2.92
Total votes		18,487	100.00	23,179	100.00

Sainte-Suzanne
Candidate	Party	First round 9 August 2015		Second round 25 October 2015	
Candidate	Party	Votes	%	Votes	%
Davilmar Pierrogene	Inite Patriyotik	2,337	36.24	3,925	48.67
Parvilus Philippe	Haitian Tèt Kale Party	2,062	31.98	4,128	51.19
Marseille Samson	Vérité	907	14.07		
Cheristin Ferdinand	Struggling People's Organization	547	8.48		
Jn Pierre Ermicile	Konsyans Patriyotik	414	6.42		
Gustave Franck	Haiti in Action	87	1.35		
Julmiste Legaire	Pati Politik Fanm ak Fanmi	67	1.04		
None of the above		27	0.42	11	0.14
Total		6,448	100.00	8,064	100.00
Valid votes		6,448	89.06	8,064	98.05
Invalid/blank votes		792	10.94	160	1.95
Total votes		7,240	100.00	8,224	100.00

Terrier-Rouge
Candidate	Party	First round 9 August 2015		Second round 25 October 2015	
Candidate	Party	Votes	%	Votes	%
Pierre Rodeley	Mouvement Patriotique Populaire Dessalinien	1,030	17.35	3,759	46.51
Louis Jovenel	Mouvement National Haïtien	852	14.35	4,305	53.27
Jean François Harry	Reseau National Bouclier	804	13.54		
Felix Alix	Pont	722	12.16		
Nelson Hermane	Konvansyon Inite Demokratik	693	11.67		
Pierre Enos	Pati Politik Fanm ak Fanmi	646	10.88		
Charles Charlot	Consortium National des Partis Politiques Haïtiens	516	8.69		
Alexandre Wisdes	Renmen Ayiti	254	4.28		
Israel Rysley	BLOC 20	197	3.32		
Calixte Godely	Alternative League for Haitian Progress and Emancipation	118	1.99		
Pierre Herold	Front Civico-Politique Haïtien	103	1.74		
None of the above		1	0.02	18	0.22
Total		5,936	100.00	8,082	100.00
Valid votes		5,936	98.25	8,082	98.18
Invalid/blank votes		106	1.75	150	1.82
Total votes		6,042	100.00	8,232	100.00

Trou-Du-Nord/Caracol
Candidate	Party	First round 9 August 2015		Second round 25 October 2015	
Candidate	Party	Votes	%	Votes	%
Pierre Wanique	Haitian Tèt Kale Party	5,139	35.08	8,940	50.95
Dorsainvil Donal	Vérité	4,508	30.78	8,569	48.83
Jean-Gilles Maurice	Platfòm Pitit Desalin	1,647	11.24		
François Jean Claude	Konsyans Patriyotik	1,387	9.47		
Rozefort Edwight	Haiti in Action	816	5.57		
Saint Cleris Belijacques	Inite Patriyotik	499	3.41		
Jacques Jacky	Fanmi Lavalas	493	3.37		
Cledor Jean Daniel	Struggling People's Organization	107	0.73		
None of the above		52	0.35	39	0.22
Total		14,648	100.00	17,548	100.00
Valid votes		14,648	93.81	17,548	97.04
Invalid/blank votes		967	6.19	536	2.96
Total votes		15,615	100.00	18,084	100.00

Vallieres/Carice
Candidate	Party	First round 9 August 2015		Second round 25 October 2015	
Candidate	Party	Votes	%	Votes	%
Bastien Jean Berthole	Haitian Tèt Kale Party	2,343	32.15	3,406	50.24
Laguerre Jean Baptiste Phanese R	Struggling People's Organization	1,573	21.58	3,359	49.55
Accilus Anne Catherine	Fusion of Haitian Social Democrats	1,159	15.90		
Phanor Ornecifort	Platfòm Pitit Desalin	741	10.17		
Jn Simon Edlyn	Vérité	732	10.04		
Celicourt Joseph Celigny	Haitian Republican Party	494	6.78		
Massena Amisson	Ansanm Patriyot pou Lavni Ayiti	169	2.32		
Castin J. Djé	Respect	29	0.40		
None of the above		48	0.66	14	0.21
Total		7,288	100.00	6,779	100.00
Valid votes		7,288	94.32	6,779	97.33
Invalid/blank votes		439	5.68	186	2.67
Total votes		7,727	100.00	6,965	100.00

Election results by constituency in Nord Ouest

Anse-A-Foleur
Candidate	Party	First round 9 August 2015		Second round 25 October 2015	
Candidate	Party	Votes	%	Votes	%
Bonhomme Louis-Marie	Pont	1,786	33.87	2,891	45.67
Raphael Appolius	Fanmi Lavalas	1,447	27.44	3,419	54.01
Joseph Joas Velly	Konvansyon Inite Demokratik	1,294	24.54		
Noel Inalio	Tet Kole sous Chimen Devlopman pou un Nord'Ouest Uni et Renonve	288	5.46		
Paul Patricia	Haiti in Action	276	5.23		
Saint-Hilaire Jameson	Renmen Ayiti	177	3.36		
None of the above		5	0.09	20	0.32
Total		5,273	100.00	6,330	100.00
Valid votes		5,273	94.24	6,330	97.64
Invalid/blank votes		322	5.76	153	2.36
Total votes		5,595	100.00	6,483	100.00

Bassin-Bleu
Candidate	Party	First round 9 August 2015		Second round 25 October 2015	
Candidate	Party	Votes	%	Votes	%
Saint-Fort Denis	Haitian Tèt Kale Party	1,057	19.89	3,714	53.23
Sylvain Wilbens	Renmen Ayiti	952	17.92	3,199	45.85
Joubert Hilaire Romual	ATERI	887	16.69		
Vil Fedeline	Pont	845	15.90		
Pierre Jeir	Konvansyon Inite Demokratik	822	15.47		
Aurelien Jean Andre	Platfòm Pitit Desalin	313	5.89		
Louis Garentcha	Pati Politik Fanm ak Fanmi	229	4.31		
Blanc Karlos	Fanmi Lavalas	122	2.30		
None of the above		86	1.62	64	0.92
Total		5,313	100.00	6,977	100.00
Valid votes		5,313	89.46	6,977	97.21
Invalid/blank votes		626	10.54	200	2.79
Total votes		5,939	100.00	7,177	100.00

Bombardopolis/Baie De Henne
Candidate	Party	First round 9 August 2015		Second round 25 October 2015	
Candidate	Party	Votes	%	Votes	%
Valbrun Nonciles	Vérité	2,802	29.81	6,216	56.96
Jean Michel Moise	Federalist Party	1,184	12.60	4,635	42.48
Telcin Saint Fanis	Fanmi Lavalas	1,121	11.93		
Joseph Pierre Monique	Haiti in Action	1,079	11.48		
Dorgil Jusclaire	Struggling People's Organization	1,044	11.11		
Jacques Gasby	Haitian Tèt Kale Party	837	8.91		
Celestin Enrico	Konvansyon Inite Demokratik	449	4.78		
Blaise Edwine	Pont	373	3.97		
Merzius Joinet	UNIR-AYITI INI	224	2.38		
Bastien Johny Missocias	Alternative League for Haitian Progress and Emancipation	172	1.83		
Alerte Marc-Kely	Consortium National des Partis Politiques Haïtiens	74	0.79		
None of the above		40	0.43	61	0.56
Total		9,399	100.00	10,912	100.00
Valid votes		9,399	95.24	10,912	96.53
Invalid/blank votes		470	4.76	392	3.47
Total votes		9,869	100.00	11,304	100.00

Chansolme
Candidate	Party	First round 9 August 2015		Second round 25 October 2015	
Candidate	Party	Votes	%	Votes	%
Joseph Fils	Struggling People's Organization	835	32.62	2,493	60.17
Pierre Théophile	Pont	706	27.58	1,636	39.49
Tatoute Pierre Martin	Vérité	401	15.66		
Fertil Chanoine	Fanmi Lavalas	276	10.78		
Mazard Fedmond	Haitian Tèt Kale Party	245	9.57		
Louis Jonas	Pati Politik Fanm ak Fanmi	74	2.89		
None of the above		23	0.90	14	0.34
Total		2,560	100.00	4,143	100.00
Valid votes		2,560	94.33	4,143	96.55
Invalid/blank votes		154	5.67	148	3.45
Total votes		2,714	100.00	4,291	100.00

Jean-Rabel
Candidate	Party	First round 9 August 2015		Second round 25 October 2015	
Candidate	Party	Votes	%	Votes	%
Gentilhomme Jean-Wysner	Tet Kole sous Chimen Devlopman pou un Nord'Ouest Uni et Renonve	3,458	21.20	9,312	48.26
Theramene Gerard	Vérité	3,144	19.28	9,928	51.45
Saintil Wilner	Haitian Tèt Kale Party	1,797	11.02		
Julmiste Remy	Struggling People's Organization	1,667	10.22		
Yavelina Jean Marie	Pont	1,510	9.26		
Louisdor Sylvain	Mouvement Progressiste pour l'Avancement des Masses	943	5.78		
Etienne Velonne	Rassemblement des Nationaux Démocrates Volontaires pour l'Unité Salvatrice	757	4.64		
Hyppias Jodel	Renmen Ayiti	738	4.53		
Zephirin Frito	Haiti in Action	695	4.26		
Jean Jacques Chama	Parti National Justice pour Tous	629	3.86		
Levasseur Wigen	Pati Politik Fanm ak Fanmi	429	2.63		
Dumesle Elines	Christian National Union for the Reconstruction of Haiti	224	1.37		
Joseph Glomy	Mouvement National Haïtien	164	1.01		
Jean Gilles Justin Nesmy	Consortium National des Partis Politiques Haïtiens	80	0.49		
None of the above		74	0.45	55	0.29
Total		16,309	100.00	19,295	100.00
Valid votes		16,309	96.83	19,295	97.93
Invalid/blank votes		534	3.17	407	2.07
Total votes		16,843	100.00	19,702	100.00

La Tortue
Candidate	Party	First round 9 August 2015		Second round 25 October 2015	
Candidate	Party	Votes	%	Votes	%
Asthene Jean	Tet Kole sous Chimen Devlopman pou un Nord'Ouest Uni et Renonve	1,932	37.30	3,199	53.91
Gros-Negre Acilus	Pont	1,187	22.92	2,723	45.89
Joseph Lidnert	Fusion of Haitian Social Democrats	835	16.12		
Joseph Rolin	Fanmi Lavalas	567	10.95		
Louissaint Saint-Luc	Renmen Ayiti	378	7.30		
Becius Serge-Bernex	Haitian Tèt Kale Party	222	4.29		
Brutus Patrick	Respect	34	0.66		
None of the above		24	0.46	12	0.20
Total		5,179	100.00	5,934	100.00
Valid votes		5,179	96.59	5,934	98.16
Invalid/blank votes		183	3.41	111	1.84
Total votes		5,362	100.00	6,045	100.00

Mole Saint-Nicolas
Candidate	Party	First round 9 August 2015		First round rerun 25 October 2015		Second round 20 November 2016	
Candidate	Party	Votes	%	Votes	%	Votes	%
Doreus Eloune	Struggling People's Organization	1,311	41.23	2,828	34.13	3,120	41.37
Dupras Yves	Vérité	883	27.77	2,047	24.71	4,413	58.52
Plancher Joseph Darnley	Respect	129	4.06	1,769	21.35		
Graduel Francisque	Pont	633	19.91	1,020	12.31		
Larrieux Wesner	Alternative League for Haitian Progress and Emancipation	131	4.12	311	3.75		
Branchedor Belot Senders	Renmen Ayiti	11	0.35	191	2.31		
Beauplan Wysler	Christian National Union for the Reconstruction of Haiti	61	1.92	57	0.69		
Louissant Ricot	Regroupement Patriotique pour le Renouveau National	6	0.19	30	0.36		
None of the above		15	0.47	32	0.39	8	0.11
Total		3,180	100.00	8,285	100.00	7,541	100.00
Valid votes		3,180	96.63	8,285	95.24	7,541	95.25
Invalid/blank votes		111	3.37	414	4.76	376	4.75
Total votes		3,291	100.00	8,699	100.00	7,917	100.00

Port-De-Paix
Candidate	Party	First round 9 August 2015		Second round 25 October 2015	
Candidate	Party	Votes	%	Votes	%
Francois Tony Antonelly Claude	Haitian Tèt Kale Party	2,345	11.64		
Gelin Leslie	Pont	2,326	11.54	13,388	46.06
Forestal Jean Mary	Konsyans Patriyotik	2,011	9.98	15,116	52.01
Francois Louystz Amyot	Reseau National Bouclier	1,966	9.76		
Agenor Wilner	Tet Kole sous Chimen Devlopman pou un Nord'Ouest Uni et Renonve	1,939	9.62		
Loriston Daniel	Konvansyon Inite Demokratik	1,911	9.48		
Lorfils Wisly	Platfòm Pitit Desalin	1,501	7.45		
Merisier Inodet	Struggling People's Organization	931	4.62		
Louissaint Colastin	Vérité	769	3.82		
Jeune Abel	Fanmi Lavalas	657	3.26		
Louima Yve	Parti National Justice pour Tous	643	3.19		
Jose Hegel	Renmen Ayiti	642	3.19		
Alceille Adieudon	Parti Populaire National	573	2.84		
Charles Lesly	Christian National Union for the Reconstruction of Haiti	467	2.32		
Frederick Marie Maude	Fusion of Haitian Social Democrats	356	1.77		
Alcime Kébir Frantz Sonighter	Respect	343	1.70		
Samuel Jacky	Socialist Action Movement	279	1.38		
Gervelus Faitner	Haiti in Action	142	0.70		
Michel Carlin	Haitian Republican Party	95	0.47		
None of the above		254	1.26	561	1.93
Total		20,150	100.00	29,065	100.00
Valid votes		20,150	93.99	29,065	95.45
Invalid/blank votes		1,289	6.01	1,384	4.55
Total votes		21,439	100.00	30,449	100.00

Saint Louis Nord
Candidate	Party	First round 9 August 2015		Second round 25 October 2015	
Candidate	Party	Votes	%	Votes	%
Maurancy Freud	Tet Kole sous Chimen Devlopman pou un Nord'Ouest Uni et Renonve	2,672	22.28	9,329	70.59
Dufresne Webelaire Amiel	Pont	1,433	11.95	3,825	28.94
Caprice Kedna	Fusion of Haitian Social Democrats	1,016	8.47		
Pascal Gabart	Reseau National Bouclier	875	7.29		
Saintil Napela	Consortium National des Partis Politiques Haïtiens	777	6.48		
Garçon Jacques	Konvansyon Inite Demokratik	716	5.97		
Fertil Jean Ronel	PPG18	712	5.94		
Souffrant Jean	Ansanm Patriyot pou Lavni Ayiti	659	5.49		
Mareus Dominique	Vérité	625	5.21		
Jean-Louis Saide	Inite Patriyotik	517	4.31		
Charles Saturne	Haitian Tèt Kale Party	420	3.50		
Deliard Saul	Mouvement National Haïtien	378	3.15		
Saintilaire Emmanuel	Fanmi Lavalas	341	2.84		
Semelfort Joseph Bertin	Platfòm Peyizan	309	2.58		
Richemond Alcime Clovel	Platfòm Pitit Desalin	301	2.51		
Louis Herode	Christian National Union for the Reconstruction of Haiti	121	1.01		
Cadet Claude Bruno	Mouvement Independent Kitirel Social Economie ak Politik an Ayiti	30	0.25		
None of the above		93	0.78	62	0.47
Total		11,995	100.00	13,216	100.00
Valid votes		11,995	96.50	13,216	98.09
Invalid/blank votes		435	3.50	257	1.91
Total votes		12,430	100.00	13,473	100.00

Election results by constituency in Ouest

Anse A Galets
Candidate	Party	First round 9 August 2015		Second round 25 October 2015	
Candidate	Party	Votes	%	Votes	%
Pierre Micalerme	Renmen Ayiti	2,113	27.74	7,223	62.85
Pierre Wilnique	Kombit Travaye Peyizan pou Libere Ayiti	1,214	15.94		
Fleurima Elonie Audain	REKLAM	1,197	15.72	4,209	36.63
Edouard Rebens	Pont	737	9.68		
Galiotte Marie Ganette	Haitian Tèt Kale Party	640	8.40		
Joseph Elder	Vérité	473	6.21		
Desbouquets Jean Wilson	Ansanm Patriyot pou Lavni Ayiti	351	4.61		
Loute Redford	Force Unite Nationale	315	4.14		
Richard Miguel	ATERI	201	2.64		
Marcelin Wilder	Fanmi Lavalas	131	1.72		
Edmond Edmonson	Platfòm Pitit Desalin	131	1.72		
Vilme Angeno	UNIR-AYITI INI	95	1.25		
None of the above		18	0.24	60	0.52
Total		7,616	100.00	11,492	100.00
Valid votes		7,616	95.49	11,492	96.26
Invalid/blank votes		360	4.51	447	3.74
Total votes		7,976	100.00	11,939	100.00

Arcahaie
Candidate	Party	First round 9 August 2015		First round rerun 25 October 2015		Second round 20 November 2016	
Candidate	Party	Votes	%	Votes	%	Votes	%
Julien Pierre Fequiere	CANAAN	93	5.22	3,018	20.25	7,050	56.79
Jura Joseph Lucien	Haitian Tèt Kale Party	458	25.73	2,839	19.05	5,225	42.09
Rene Wilner	Vérité	515	28.93	1,878	12.60		
Joseph Ireste	Fanmi Lavalas	162	9.10	1,507	10.11		
Aboutou Jean-Pierre	Alternative League for Haitian Progress and Emancipation	61	3.43	1,429	9.59		
Michel Jean Jackson	Haiti in Action	138	7.75	1,152	7.73		
Desir Enguel	Renmen Ayiti	35	1.97	548	3.68		
Dazouloute Jean Raymond	Struggling People's Organization	29	1.63	433	2.91		
Duvert Jean Dany	Konvansyon Inite Demokratik	12	0.67	398	2.67		
Sainvil Pierre Maxo	Mouvement Progressiste pour l'Avancement des Masses	25	1.40	367	2.46		
Sainvil Andre Watson	Platfòm Pitit Desalin	97	5.45	272	1.83		
Nestor Marc Elie	UNIR-AYITI INI	6	0.34	247	1.66		
Pierre Joseph Alexandre	Respect	30	1.69	211	1.42		
Neus Jean Wilner	PPG18	26	1.46	188	1.26		
Dormevil, Dakolo	Konsyans Patriyotik	65	3.65	159	1.07		
Fabre Jean Mario	Pati Politik Fanm ak Fanmi	10	0.56	109	0.73		
None of the above		18	1.01	148	0.99	139	1.12
Total		1,780	100.00	14,903	100.00	12,414	100.00
Valid votes		1,780	93.05	14,903	93.11	12,414	93.62
Invalid/blank votes		133	6.95	1,102	6.89	846	6.38
Total votes		1,913	100.00	16,005	100.00	13,260	100.00

Cabaret
Candidate	Party	First round 9 August 2015		First round rerun 25 October 2015		Second round 20 November 2016	
Candidate	Party	Votes	%	Votes	%	Votes	%
Louis Joseph Manes	Fanmi Lavalas	819	30.01	4,108	31.45	5,489	67.23
Benoit Judith Drouillard	Vérité	659	24.15	1,825	13.97		
Fenelus Pierre Sadrac	Renmen Ayiti	159	5.83	1,825	13.97	2,616	32.04
Paul Jean Rodrigue	Struggling People's Organization	111	4.07	1,805	13.82		
Depas Joseph Martial	Haiti in Action	204	7.48	1,153	8.83		
Georges Bonard	Fusion of Haitian Social Democrats	165	6.05	635	4.86		
Augustin Pierre Saget	Pati Kreyol Nou Ye	61	2.24	518	3.97		
Fortilus Jean Elius	Haitian Republican Party	36	1.32	350	2.68		
Louisma Joseph Duckens	Socialist Action Movement	318	11.65	345	2.64		
Sanon Joseph Andris	Pont	176	6.45	314	2.40		
Jean-Baptiste Sebastien Thierry	Alliance Démocratique pour la Reconciliation Nationale	12	0.44	88	0.67		
Francois Jean Watson	Inite Patriyotik	7	0.26	68	0.52		
None of the above		2	0.07	29	0.22	60	0.73
Total		2,729	100.00	13,063	100.00	8,165	100.00
Valid votes		2,729	97.71	13,063	96.33	8,165	95.31
Invalid/blank votes		64	2.29	497	3.67	402	4.69
Total votes		2,793	100.00	13,560	100.00	8,567	100.00

Carrefour
Candidate	Party	First round 9 August 2015		Second round 25 October 2015	
Candidate	Party	Votes	%	Votes	%
Beauvil Jacques	Vérité	3,070	15.10	28,642	61.97
Millien Romage Fritzner	Fanmi Lavalas	2,567	12.62	15,300	33.10
Blaise Elie	Haitian Tèt Kale Party	1,978	9.73		
Domond Harold	Konvansyon Inite Demokratik	1,731	8.51		
Delille Lucmanne	Consortium National des Partis Politiques Haïtiens	1,477	7.26		
Anilus Nadine	Fusion of Haitian Social Democrats	1,087	5.35		
Jerome Eddy	Alternative League for Haitian Progress and Emancipation	767	3.77		
Vilsaint Jean	Force Unite Nationale	687	3.38		
Toussaint Jean Robert	Mouvement Progressiste pour l'Avancement des Masses	656	3.23		
Gedillaume Robert	Cohesion Nationale des Partis Politiques Haïtiens	533	2.62		
Marette Mike Onel	Respect	482	2.37		
Alfred Perard	Force Démocratique Haïtien Intégré	468	2.30		
Joseph Svendersly Georges Guinio	Rassemblement des Citoyens Patriotiques	409	2.01		
Jolicoeur Julysse	Struggling People's Organization	405	1.99		
Valentin Patrick	Renmen Ayiti	387	1.90		
Elie Fredo	MOPANOU	347	1.71		
Jn Paul Jean Robert	Haitian Republican Party	314	1.54		
Gabriel Fritzner	Inite Patriyotik	310	1.52		
Sifrin Marie Francesca	Pati Politik Fanm ak Fanmi	287	1.41		
Polycarpe Alfred	Parti de la Diaspora Haïtienne pour Haïti	229	1.13		
Lindor Jean Claude	Christian National Union for the Reconstruction of Haiti	221	1.09		
Estime Emmanuel	PPG18	197	0.97		
Mezil Lee-Mayjors	CANAAN	185	0.91		
Revolte Esther	Rapwoche	170	0.84		
Dorvil Jean Wilfrid	Platfòm Leve Kanpe	166	0.82		
Deloge Patrick	Mouvement National Haïtien	152	0.75		
Charlemagne Frantzie	Entente Nationale des Travailleurs pour le Reveil d'Haïti	149	0.73		
Toussaint Jean Eveque	Front Uni pour la Renaissance d'Haïti	112	0.55		
Nelfils Moise	Plan d'Action Citoyenne	95	0.47		
Martelly Marvin Dimitri	Platforme Ayisyen Kap Travay pou Rekonstwi Ayiti Infyel ak Liberel	84	0.41		
Myrthil Walcky	Kombit Liberasyon Ekonomik	62	0.30		
None of the above		550	2.70	2,279	4.93
Total		20,334	100.00	46,221	100.00
Valid votes		20,334	94.06	46,221	92.27
Invalid/blank votes		1,283	5.94	3,871	7.73
Total votes		21,617	100.00	50,092	100.00

Cite Soleil
Candidate	Party	First round 9 August 2015		First round rerun 25 October 2015		Second round 20 November 2016	
Candidate	Party	Votes	%	Votes	%	Votes	%
Pierre Lemaire	Renmen Ayiti	5,386	30.70	7,082	26.69	8,328	76.54
Saint-Fleur Almetis Junior	Struggling People's Organization	1,057	6.03	4,180	15.75	1,632	15.00
Dalmand Luckenson	Fusion of Haitian Social Democrats	1,989	11.34	2,906	10.95		
Andou Nancy Jennifer	Action Démocratie pour Bâtir Haïti	817	4.66	1,723	6.49		
Jean Evens	Vérité	720	4.10	1,673	6.30		
Jean-Louis Vladimir	Haitian Tèt Kale Party	373	2.13	1,296	4.88		
Pierre Elisson	Fanmi Lavalas	604	3.44	1,094	4.12		
Saint Hilaire Seguinde	Rassemblement des Nationaux Démocrates Volontaires pour l'Unité Salvatrice	359	2.05	930	3.50		
Dorisma Samuel	Konvansyon Inite Demokratik	265	1.51	548	2.06		
Francois Jude	Platfòm Peyizan	118	0.67	530	2.00		
Ariste Daniel Leonce	Platfòm Leve Kanpe	425	2.42	427	1.61		
Medard Dieunel	Konsyans Patriyotik	292	1.66	373	1.41		
Louis Petterson	Force Unite Nationale	316	1.80	366	1.38		
Louisjuste Louisma	Platfòm Pitit Desalin	217	1.24	350	1.32		
Charles Mickel	Alternative League for Haitian Progress and Emancipation	351	2.00	343	1.29		
Pierre Milka	Pati Politik Fanm ak Fanmi	189	1.08	285	1.07		
Clermont Berthony	SOLUTION	169	0.96	248	0.93		
Choudlor Jean Sainsoit	PPG18	533	3.04	246	0.93		
Jean-Samedi Ketheline	Tèt Ansanm	210	1.20	225	0.85		
Raphael Brunot	Rapwoche	32	0.18	223	0.84		
Cesar Eddy	Pont	51	0.29	167	0.63		
Bonheur Delva Jean Negot	KONFYANS	770	4.39	151	0.57		
Point-Du-Jour Oberson	Plateforme Jistis	177	1.01	125	0.47		
Joseph Fritzner	Force Démocratique Haïtien Intégré	112	0.64	114	0.43		
Galeus Erick	BLOC 20	395	2.25	109	0.41		
Tertulien Patrick	Union Nationale des Démocrates Haïtiens	620	3.53	102	0.38		
Pierre Joseph Bithol	Mouvement d'Union Republicaine	116	0.66	93	0.35		
Feuille Marie Germaine	ATERI	109	0.62	91	0.34		
Charles Jean-Robert	Mouvement Progressiste pour l'Avancement des Masses	16	0.09	90	0.34		
Dorval Youston	Haitian Republican Party	340	1.94	73	0.28		
Baptiste Dominique	Union des Patriotes pour l'Avancement National	20	0.11	51	0.19		
Luma Elie	Retabli Ayiti	29	0.17	41	0.15		
Polynice Nokens	Kombit Liberasyon Ekonomik	239	1.36	38	0.14		
Rene Jaen Colens	Pati Kreyol Nou Ye	67	0.38	28	0.11		
Vital Jules	Ansanm Patriyot pou Lavni Ayiti	20	0.11	24	0.09		
None of the above		40	0.23	194	0.73	920	8.46
Total		17,543	100.00	26,539	100.00	10,880	100.00
Valid votes		17,543	92.55	26,539	94.09	10,880	89.20
Invalid/blank votes		1,412	7.45	1,666	5.91	1,317	10.80
Total votes		18,955	100.00	28,205	100.00	12,197	100.00

Cornillon
Candidate	Party	First round 9 August 2015		First round rerun 25 October 2015		Second round 20 November 2016	
Candidate	Party	Votes	%	Votes	%	Votes	%
Rival Raymonde	Ansanm Patriyot pou Lavni Ayiti	3,125	47.23	4,546	43.39	4,758	55.19
Medeus Alphonse	Vérité	1,647	24.89	3,034	28.96	3,846	44.61
Baptiste Lamarre	Haitian Tèt Kale Party	1,158	17.50	2,374	22.66		
Monplaisir Jackson	Alternative League for Haitian Progress and Emancipation	426	6.44	173	1.65		
Derosier Prener	Mouvement National Haïtien	67	1.01	149	1.42		
Alcindor Zacharie	Konvansyon Inite Demokratik	81	1.22	106	1.01		
Paulemon Sandra	Platfòm Pitit Desalin	110	1.66	69	0.66		
None of the above		2	0.03	25	0.24	17	0.20
Total		6,616	100.00	10,476	100.00	8,621	100.00
Valid votes		6,616	92.62	10,476	94.82	8,621	95.26
Invalid/blank votes		527	7.38	572	5.18	429	4.74
Total votes		7,143	100.00	11,048	100.00	9,050	100.00

Croix Des Bouquets
Candidate	Party	First round 9 August 2015		Second round 25 October 2015	
Candidate	Party	Votes	%	Votes	%
Jean Willer Jean	Konvansyon Inite Demokratik	2,179	14.22	17,701	62.19
Cabner Eric	Vérité	1,119	7.30	9,805	34.45
Miracles Pierre Fenel Jean	Christian National Union for the Reconstruction of Haiti	891	5.81		
Blaise Guerby	BLOC 20	770	5.02		
Bien Aime Rose Andree Bony	Fanmi Lavalas	726	4.74		
Michel Osnel	Inite Patriyotik	723	4.72		
Jecrois Jean Webens	Pont	716	4.67		
Jean Marie Jean Richard	Force Unite Nationale	642	4.19		
Dieudonne Pierrre M.Kern Kerkem	Alternative League for Haitian Progress and Emancipation	626	4.08		
Lohier Jean Nizard	Fusion of Haitian Social Democrats	565	3.69		
Guillaume Edler	REKLAM	532	3.47		
Bastien Marie Sterline	Haitian Tèt Kale Party	500	3.26		
Cidel Jean	Rapwoche	442	2.88		
Dorestant Jean Patrick	Christian Movement for a New Haiti	411	2.68		
Brutus Jean Gerald	Ansanm Patriyot pou Lavni Ayiti	405	2.64		
Saint-Juste Sony	Struggling People's Organization	368	2.40		
Myrvil Ronal	Platfòm Pitit Desalin	341	2.22		
Fanfan Joseph Andre	Renmen Ayiti	313	2.04		
Thomas Jean Henry	Parti pour la Libération des Masses et d'Intégration Sociale	278	1.81		
Saint Juste Jean Rodriguez	Pati Politik Fanm ak Fanmi	275	1.79		
Dejean Jean Berthaud	Mobilisation pour le Progrès d'Haïti	269	1.75		
Pierre Jean Nelson	Kombit Travaye Peyizan pou Libere Ayiti	265	1.73		
Remy Dominique	Force Démocratique Haïtien Intégré	238	1.55		
Louis Jean Emmanuel	Concorde Nationale	190	1.24		
Antoine Maxime Beatrice	Christian Democratic Party of Haiti	178	1.16		
Durose Jean-Flanel	CANAAN	140	0.91		
Alfred Kensley	Kombit Liberasyon Ekonomik	111	0.72		
Deshommes Presangloire	Union Nationale des Démocrates Haïtiens	106	0.69		
Seignon Jean Jeacques	Mouvement Patriotique Populaire Dessalinien	102	0.67		
Stinfil Jean Theogene	Alliance Démocratique pour la Reconciliation Nationale	99	0.65		
Hilaire Carlo	UNIR-AYITI INI	90	0.59		
Jean Baptiste Jean Alexte	PPG18	88	0.57		
Jean Maxime Occelin	Plateforme Jistis	87	0.57		
Cesar Hugue	ATERI	81	0.53		
Guirand Georges	Parti de la Diaspora Haïtienne pour Haïti	77	0.50		
Nicolas Herold	Reseau National Bouclier	61	0.40		
Romain Elie	Regroupement Patriotique pour le Renouveau National	18	0.12		
None of the above		306	2.00	956	3.36
Total		15,328	100.00	28,462	100.00
Valid votes		15,328	94.51	28,462	92.55
Invalid/blank votes		891	5.49	2,292	7.45
Total votes		16,219	100.00	30,754	100.00

Delmas
Candidate	Party	First round 9 August 2015		Second round 25 October 2015	
Candidate	Party	Votes	%	Votes	%
Bodeau Gary	Reseau National Bouclier	2,337	16.91	27,099	56.84
Jeudy Ernst	Rassemblement des Nationaux Démocrates Volontaires pour l'Unité Salvatrice	1,691	12.24		
Martin Jean Francois	Fanmi Lavalas	1,358	9.83	17,828	37.40
Sainvil Evelyne	PPG18	796	5.76		
Charlot Jacquelin Junior	Vérité	772	5.59		
Filoscin Fritz Gerald	Platfòm Pitit Desalin	615	4.45		
Baron Joel H. Jn C. Clifford	Struggling People's Organization	457	3.31		
Plaisimé Montès	Christian Movement for a New Haiti	430	3.11		
Inel Torchon	Plateforme Jistis	378	2.74		
Sainvil Franck	Regeneration Economique et Sociale dans l'Unite et la Liberte Totale d'Action de Tous	350	2.53		
Atus Jean Renold	Regroupement Patriotique pour le Renouveau National	349	2.53		
Joseph Reynold	Ligue Dessalinienne	288	2.08		
Clerge Jean Ernest	Alternative League for Haitian Progress and Emancipation	250	1.81		
Cenatus Ilotane Desima	Pati Politik Fanm ak Fanmi	249	1.80		
Descorbeth Jean Marie	Respect	241	1.74		
Louis Pierre Antoine	Fusion of Haitian Social Democrats	227	1.64		
Jean Claudine Bernard	Parti pour la Libération des Masses et d'Intégration Sociale	192	1.39		
Ducena Dickenson	CANAAN	189	1.37		
Calix Jeff	UNIR-AYITI INI	181	1.31		
Jean Jacques Senouaire	Mouvement Progressiste pour l'Avancement des Masses	164	1.19		
Cesar Marie Evelyne	Platfòm Peyizan	153	1.11		
Celestin Pecky	Cohesion Nationale des Partis Politiques Haïtiens	150	1.09		
Nelson Jean Laurent	Renmen Ayiti	143	1.03		
Joseph Gabriel	Mobilisation pour le Progrès d'Haïti	142	1.03		
Pierre Davidson	Pati Kreyol Nou Ye	134	0.97		
Nobert Olinor	Tèt Ansanm	117	0.85		
Francois Joseph Dessalines	BLOC 20	114	0.82		
Prevost Ernst	Parti de la Diaspora Haïtienne pour Haïti	105	0.76		
Marseille Jean Cyrus	Delivrans	93	0.67		
Rosier Eder	Ansanm Patriyot pou Lavni Ayiti	89	0.64		
Bertin Marie Therese Rose-Lys Cadet	Haiti in Action	82	0.59		
Cetoute Jean Wandol	Haitian Republican Party	81	0.59		
Adolphe Jackson	ATERI	76	0.55		
Belfort Faubert	Retabli Ayiti	68	0.49		
Michel Joseph Junior	MOPANOU	56	0.41		
Mathurin Michelet	Konsyans Patriyotik	53	0.38		
Jerome Renold	Christian National Union for the Reconstruction of Haiti	50	0.36		
Prudent Pierre Patrick	Plateforme Politique Antre Nou	47	0.34		
Buissereth Joel	Union Nationale des Démocrates Haïtiens	33	0.24		
Desir Dieuveu	Mouvement National Haïtien	21	0.15		
None of the above		499	3.61	2,746	5.76
Total		13,820	100.00	47,673	100.00
Valid votes		13,820	92.90	47,673	91.16
Invalid/blank votes		1,057	7.10	4,621	8.84
Total votes		14,877	100.00	52,294	100.00

Fonds-Verrettes/Ganthier
Candidate	Party	First round 9 August 2015		Second round 25 October 2015	
Candidate	Party	Votes	%	Votes	%
Destine Pierre Jude	Vérité	4,924	28.93	14,992	64.21
Sanozier Francois	Struggling People's Organization	4,559	26.79	8,163	34.96
Vil Jean Jorel	Renmen Ayiti	2,255	13.25		
Brésil Jean Augustin	Fusion of Haitian Social Democrats	1,146	6.73		
Meritus Claude	Fanmi Lavalas	727	4.27		
Dazeme Sony	Konvansyon Inite Demokratik	676	3.97		
Nere Alquil	Rassemblement des Nationaux Démocrates Volontaires pour l'Unité Salvatrice	589	3.46		
Mathelus Pierre Louis	KONFYANS	429	2.52		
Jacques Betty Vivianne	Haitian Tèt Kale Party	410	2.41		
Pierre Saint Alain	Consortium National des Partis Politiques Haïtiens	289	1.70		
Chery Roland	Christian National Union for the Reconstruction of Haiti	239	1.40		
Dorisca Frantz	Parti pour l'Evolution Nationale Haïtienne	226	1.33		
Alexandre Schiller	Platfòm Peyizan	189	1.11		
Louisme Jean Lucien	Mouvement Patriotique Populaire Dessalinien	147	0.86		
None of the above		214	1.26	192	0.82
Total		17,019	100.00	23,347	100.00
Valid votes		17,019	91.78	23,347	94.71
Invalid/blank votes		1,524	8.22	1,305	5.29
Total votes		18,543	100.00	24,652	100.00

Grand-Goave
Candidate	Party	First round 9 August 2015		Second round 25 October 2015	
Candidate	Party	Votes	%	Votes	%
Lumerant Jean Marcel	Konvansyon Inite Demokratik	4,553	41.30	7,371	50.18
Sassine Jean Philippe B.	Vérité	3,575	32.43	7,265	49.46
Exume Marie Benita	Fusion of Haitian Social Democrats	1,593	14.45		
Zamor Wouillio	Platfòm Peyizan	816	7.40		
Avril Carlebe	Platfòm Leve Kanpe	121	1.10		
Sterling Joseph Telemaque	Platfòm Pitit Desalin	104	0.94		
Xavier Rigaud	Fanmi Lavalas	87	0.79		
Pierre Jean Elie	Struggling People's Organization	78	0.71		
Sainclas Olking	Respect	30	0.27		
St-Cyr Joseph Jude	Reseau National Bouclier	18	0.16		
None of the above		48	0.44	52	0.35
Total		11,023	100.00	14,688	100.00
Valid votes		11,023	93.65	14,688	97.49
Invalid/blank votes		748	6.35	378	2.51
Total votes		11,771	100.00	15,066	100.00

Gressier
Candidate	Party	First round 9 August 2015		First round rerun 25 October 2015		Second round 20 November 2016	
Candidate	Party	Votes	%	Votes	%	Votes	%
Vericain Joseph Antonio	Haitian Tèt Kale Party	1,606	27.11	3,569	28.96	5,502	56.41
Oscar Jean Ronald	Konvansyon Inite Demokratik	1,704	28.77	3,043	24.69	4,020	41.21
Val Jean Elie	Vérité	935	15.79	1,507	12.23		
Saint Louis Dorvil Jean	Fanmi Lavalas	414	6.99	889	7.21		
Jean Elie	Force Unite Nationale	87	1.47	882	7.16		
Casseus Bertho	Haitian Republican Party	368	6.21	464	3.77		
Thelemaque Jean Rock	CANAAN	22	0.37	262	2.13		
Toussaint Joseph Fritznel	Haitian United Socialist Party	132	2.23	261	2.12		
Dolce Fortune Marie Pauline	Alternative League for Haitian Progress and Emancipation	201	3.39	253	2.05		
Jean Rosemond	Reseau National Bouclier	39	0.66	228	1.85		
Gabriel Pierre Richard	Respect	20	0.34	143	1.16		
Cassy Wesner	Socialist Action Movement	47	0.79	127	1.03		
Jean Billy	Pont	56	0.95	99	0.80		
Florestal Jean Edrick	Entente Nationale des Travailleurs pour le Reveil d'Haïti	30	0.51	83	0.67		
Antoine Bazile Edna	Pati Politik Fanm ak Fanmi	12	0.20	83	0.67		
Tingue Jean	Fusion of Haitian Social Democrats	40	0.68	70	0.57		
Senatus Jean Wilner	Cohesion Nationale des Partis Politiques Haïtiens	39	0.66	58	0.47		
Alexandre Yves	Platfòm Peyizan	52	0.88	58	0.47		
Demosthene Jores	Struggling People's Organization	18	0.30	53	0.43		
Miracle Joseph Gabriel	Mouvement Patriotique Populaire Dessalinien	55	0.93	46	0.37		
None of the above		46	0.78	146	1.18	232	2.38
Total		5,923	100.00	12,324	100.00	9,754	100.00
Valid votes		5,923	94.56	12,324	93.39	9,754	94.82
Invalid/blank votes		341	5.44	872	6.61	533	5.18
Total votes		6,264	100.00	13,196	100.00	10,287	100.00

Kenscoff
Candidate	Party	First round 9 August 2015		Second round 25 October 2015	
Candidate	Party	Votes	%	Votes	%
Antoine Alfredo Junior	Konvansyon Inite Demokratik	2,841	35.56	6,336	63.11
Louis Andre Gustave	Haitian Tèt Kale Party	1,674	20.95	3,575	35.61
Fanfan Lesly	Vérité	918	11.49		
Joseph Jose	Struggling People's Organization	862	10.79		
Joseph Jean Wilner	Grand Rassemblement pour l'Evolution d'Haïti	835	10.45		
Jean Jacques Emile Hibbert Eric	Alternative League for Haitian Progress and Emancipation	254	3.18		
Porsenna Jean Cedric	Pont	122	1.53		
Joseph Jean Noel	Respect	115	1.44		
Francois Richard	Inite Patriyotik	102	1.28		
Saint-Hilaire Saint-Victor	Platfòm Pitit Desalin	101	1.26		
Mondesir Nathalie	UNIR-AYITI INI	84	1.05		
Laguerre Dieuseul	Fusion of Haitian Social Democrats	55	0.69		
None of the above		27	0.34	128	1.28
Total		7,990	100.00	10,039	100.00
Valid votes		7,990	92.78	10,039	94.45
Invalid/blank votes		622	7.22	590	5.55
Total votes		8,612	100.00	10,629	100.00

Leogane
Candidate	Party	First round 9 August 2015		Second round 25 October 2015	
Candidate	Party	Votes	%	Votes	%
Hippolite Jean Wilson	Haitian Tèt Kale Party	9,214	48.78	17,107	56.66
Dumont Jean Baptiste Anthony	Rasssemblement des Patriotes Haïtiens	5,248	27.78	12,749	42.23
Jean Louis Guston	Fanmi Lavalas	3,085	16.33		
Delice Clementa	Renmen Ayiti	412	2.18		
Cazeau Marie Olga	Platfòm Pitit Desalin	349	1.85		
Pierre Wilky	Inite Patriyotik	228	1.21		
Desanges Marie Edwidge Semey	Fusion of Haitian Social Democrats	165	0.87		
None of the above		187	0.99	336	1.11
Total		18,888	100.00	30,192	100.00
Valid votes		18,888	95.13	30,192	97.03
Invalid/blank votes		966	4.87	923	2.97
Total votes		19,854	100.00	31,115	100.00

Petion-Ville
Candidate	Party	First round 9 August 2015		Second round 25 October 2015	
Candidate	Party	Votes	%	Votes	%
Tardieu Jerry	Vérité	6,247	30.86	30,633	70.49
Phinéus Jean Israel	Fanmi Lavalas	1,689	8.34	11,039	25.40
Alexis Helene Celan	Renmen Ayiti	903	4.46		
Celestin Gerard Guy	Pati Politik Fanm ak Fanmi	735	3.63		
Etienne Fritzner	Ansanm Patriyot pou Lavni Ayiti	675	3.33		
Avin Alex Mick	Reseau National Bouclier	659	3.26		
Maison Jean Claude	Ligue Dessalinienne	648	3.20		
St Louis Magalie	Platfòm Pitit Desalin	550	2.72		
Haspil Richard	Fusion of Haitian Social Democrats	549	2.71		
Jn Baptiste Stevenson	Christian Movement for a New Haiti	543	2.68		
Viaud Jean Marie Dit Gerard	Socialist Action Movement	539	2.66		
Jean-Gilles Nobert	Alternative Socialiste	533	2.63		
Regala Hermann	Consortium National des Partis Politiques Haïtiens	532	2.63		
Jacquet Rosny	Union des Patriotes pour l'Avancement National	514	2.54		
Senatus Patrick	Struggling People's Organization	439	2.17		
Lapointe Micheline	PPG18	404	2.00		
Fleurime Reginald	Regroupement Patriotique pour le Renouveau National	365	1.80		
Exantus Evens	Haitian United Socialist Party	341	1.68		
Jacques Lionel Acloque	Pont	335	1.65		
Gabriel Luckner	Grand Rassemblement pour l'Evolution d'Haïti	320	1.58		
Etienne Johnes	Force Unite Nationale	319	1.58		
Belville Emilio	Parti National Justice pour Tous	285	1.41		
Vilsaint Jacques	Alternative League for Haitian Progress and Emancipation	242	1.20		
Kessa Raoulson C.	Rassemblement des Nationaux Démocrates Volontaires pour l'Unité Salvatrice	224	1.11		
Barreau Guitho	Mouvement d'Union Republicaine	222	1.10		
Saint Lot Jackson	Parti pour l'Evolution Nationale Haïtienne	194	0.96		
Jean Anel	Respect	179	0.88		
Elustin Philistin	Mouvement Progressiste pour l'Avancement des Masses	175	0.86		
Alexandre Stanley	Platforme Ayisyen Kap Travay pou Rekonstwi Ayiti Infyel ak Liberel	173	0.85		
Semira Mercidieu	Parti Démocratique Institutionaliste	131	0.65		
None of the above		581	2.87	1,784	4.11
Total		20,245	100.00	43,456	100.00
Valid votes		20,245	92.84	43,456	91.33
Invalid/blank votes		1,561	7.16	4,123	8.67
Total votes		21,806	100.00	47,579	100.00

Petit-Goave
Candidate	Party	First round 9 August 2015		Second round 25 October 2015	
Candidate	Party	Votes	%	Votes	%
Alexandre Germain Fils	Vérité	8,359	38.64	18,012	64.88
Thimoleon Stevenson Jacques	Haitian Tèt Kale Party	5,700	26.35	9,551	34.40
Zamor Kebreau	Struggling People's Organization	3,239	14.97		
Beneche Martial	KONFYANS	2,172	10.04		
Innocent Mackenzy	Fanmi Lavalas	805	3.72		
Beneche Jean Marie Frederick	Renmen Ayiti	396	1.83		
Julien Emmanuel	Platfòm Pitit Desalin	344	1.59		
Cribe Nesly	Mouvement Patriotique Populaire Dessalinien	251	1.16		
Josselin Joseph Renald	Fusion of Haitian Social Democrats	152	0.70		
Archange Albert Camille	Respect	58	0.27		
Merilien Prosper	Consortium National des Partis Politiques Haïtiens	58	0.27		
Lindor Getheau	Konvansyon Inite Demokratik	14	0.06		
Sincere Elisee	Platfòm Peyizan	12	0.06		
None of the above		73	0.34	201	0.72
Total		21,633	100.00	27,764	100.00
Valid votes		21,633	96.32	27,764	97.56
Invalid/blank votes		827	3.68	693	2.44
Total votes		22,460	100.00	28,457	100.00

Pointe A Raquette 9 August 2015
Candidate	Party	Votes	%
Guerrier Jackie	Inite Patriyotik	2,611	49.02
Joseph Bosener	Vérité	721	13.54
Saint-Victor Feed	Struggling People's Organization	667	12.52
Lagrandeur Jones	Fusion of Haitian Social Democrats	625	11.73
Toussaint Amos	Alternative League for Haitian Progress and Emancipation	286	5.37
Nicolas Dadou	Konvansyon Inite Demokratik	138	2.59
Leger Guito	Fanmi Lavalas	102	1.92
Leblanc Jean Whestern	Renmen Ayiti	102	1.92
Metesier Ducarmel	Platfòm Pitit Desalin	35	0.66
None of the above		39	0.73
Total		5,326	100.00
Valid votes		5,326	97.00
Invalid/blank votes		165	3.00
Total votes		5,491	100.00

Port-Au-Prince 1st
Candidate	Party	First round 25 October 2015		Second round 20 November 2016	
Candidate	Party	Votes	%	Votes	%
Millien Roger	Fanmi Lavalas	2,316	11.02	6,273	45.89
Severin Patrick	Inite Patriyotik	1,767	8.41		
Janvier Lucsonne	Reseau National Bouclier	1,447	6.89	5,597	40.95
Cesar Pierre Wisthlet	Haitian Tèt Kale Party	1,366	6.50		
Joseph Johnson	Konvansyon Inite Demokratik	1,156	5.50		
Timothee Rony	Platfòm Pitit Desalin	1,115	5.31		
Glorius Job	Renmen Ayiti	1,077	5.12		
Lafleur Ernst	REKLAM	990	4.71		
Joseph Antoine	Ansanm Patriyot pou Lavni Ayiti	943	4.49		
Foreste Patrick	Rassemblement des Citoyens Patriotiques	741	3.53		
Auguste Ronald Antoine	Mouvement Progressiste pour l'Avancement des Masses	729	3.47		
Forestal Josue	Plateforme Jistis	643	3.06		
Laguerre Alix	Rapwoche	604	2.87		
Senecal Ralph	Respect	558	2.66		
Michel Sifrant	Fusion of Haitian Social Democrats	527	2.51		
Villefranche Paul	KONFYANS	483	2.30		
Loiseau Marjorie	Struggling People's Organization	472	2.25		
Valentin Holdy	Platfòm Peyizan	447	2.13		
Jean Simone Irilan Maxime	Haiti in Action	438	2.08		
Saint Louis Rolny	Pont	426	2.03		
Saint Jean Maxwell	Cohesion Nationale des Partis Politiques Haïtiens	365	1.74		
Dufort Maxime	Entente Nationale des Travailleurs pour le Reveil d'Haïti	331	1.57		
Pierre Florette	Vérité	261	1.24		
Honorat Florana	Force Unite Nationale	234	1.11		
Thelusma Pierre-Richard	Rassemblement des Nationaux Démocrates Volontaires pour l'Unité Salvatrice	234	1.11		
Frederic Samy	Front Civico-Politique Haïtien	211	1.00		
Mathieu Natalie St-Jude	Regroupement Patriotique pour le Renouveau National	197	0.94		
Alexandre Joseph Jhony	Konsyans Patriyotik	130	0.62		
St Fort Eddy	Parti pour la Libération des Masses et d'Intégration Sociale	82	0.39		
Bellevue Luckner	Parti Populaire National	69	0.33		
Jean Pierre Patrick	Retabli Ayiti	54	0.26		
Louima Ronite	MRA	48	0.23		
Gaston Jean Edy	BLOC 20	48	0.23		
François Guidel	Nouvelle Haïti	41	0.20		
None of the above		466	2.22	1,799	13.16
Total		21,016	100.00	13,669	100.00
Valid votes		21,016	93.51	13,669	86.34
Invalid/blank votes		1,458	6.49	2,163	13.66
Total votes		22,474	100.00	15,832	100.00

Port-Au-Prince 2nd
Candidate	Party	First round 9 August 2015		Second round 25 October 2015	
Candidate	Party	Votes	%	Votes	%
Lochard Jean Rene	Haitian Tèt Kale Party	2,338	23.52	12,774	48.97
Romain Ronald	Vérité	1,716	17.27	11,705	44.87
Beauvoir Mario	Pont	758	7.63		
Benoit Fritznel	Fanmi Lavalas	677	6.81		
Juste Adelcie	Renmen Ayiti	531	5.34		
Jacques James	KONVIKSYON	531	5.34		
Otarus Abdonir	Ansanm Patriyot pou Lavni Ayiti	381	3.83		
Lherisson Jean Robert	Mouvement National des Citoyens	336	3.38		
Coicou Anthony Marcel	Respect	332	3.34		
Fermilus Myrbel	Mouvement Patriotique Populaire Dessalinien	272	2.74		
Jean Louis Ketelet	Platfòm Pitit Desalin	192	1.93		
Desauguste Jules Markens	Struggling People's Organization	179	1.80		
Isaac Evens	Fusion of Haitian Social Democrats	167	1.68		
Sineus Dieunet	PPG18	150	1.51		
Saint Juste Guerrier	Consortium National des Partis Politiques Haïtiens	130	1.31		
Abraham Kenol	Union Nationale des Démocrates Haïtiens	129	1.30		
Cazir Schultz Simpssie	Nouvelle Haïti	104	1.05		
Jerome Danis	Platfòm Peyizan	102	1.03		
Adolphe Camille	Haitian Republican Party	90	0.91		
Thesee Pierre Paul	Socialist Action Movement	78	0.78		
Jeen Welch Dicksent	Christian National Union for the Reconstruction of Haiti	67	0.67		
Tiberis Lesly	Regeneration Economique et Sociale dans l'Unite et la Liberte Totale d'Action de Tous	64	0.64		
Louicher Jn Joseph	Concorde Nationale	64	0.64		
Metellus Michel	Plan d'Action Citoyenne	62	0.62		
Juste Pierre	Entente Nationale des Travailleurs pour le Reveil d'Haïti	35	0.35		
Calixte Jacques	Mouvement Progressiste pour l'Avancement des Masses	33	0.33		
None of the above		421	4.24	1,606	6.16
Total		9,939	100.00	26,085	100.00
Valid votes		9,939	93.06	26,085	91.16
Invalid/blank votes		741	6.94	2,530	8.84
Total votes		10,680	100.00	28,615	100.00

Port-Au-Prince 3rd
Candidate	Party	First round 9 August 2015		Second round 25 October 2015	
Candidate	Party	Votes	%	Votes	%
Printemps Belizaire	Fanmi Lavalas	1,397	7.88	15,656	48.67
Antoine Nesly	Reseau National Bouclier	1,246	7.03	14,522	45.14
Theolin Felder	KONVIKSYON	1,014	5.72		
Barolette Paul Syril Moise	Konbit Nasyonal	905	5.10		
Joseph Wilner	Vérité	896	5.05		
Augustin Alin	Haitian Tèt Kale Party	855	4.82		
Demosthenes Alex	Ansanm Patriyot pou Lavni Ayiti	684	3.86		
Francois Rigal	Alliance Démocratique pour la Reconciliation Nationale	654	3.69		
Saint Jean Pedrica	Fusion of Haitian Social Democrats	575	3.24		
Jean-Baptiste Jean Edmond	Platforme Ayisyen Kap Travay pou Rekonstwi Ayiti Infyel ak Liberel	409	2.31		
Aristil Jean Nathan	Entente Nationale des Travailleurs pour le Reveil d'Haïti	407	2.30		
Telisma Leny	Renmen Ayiti	398	2.24		
Telcira Pierre Richard	Alternative League for Haitian Progress and Emancipation	385	2.17		
Jean Marie Rodrigue	Mouvement d'Union Republicaine	383	2.16		
Augustin Marie Myriame	Konvansyon Inite Demokratik	379	2.14		
Jean Evenson	Plateforme Jistis	376	2.12		
Surin Kettly Adam	CANAAN	352	1.98		
Norzeron Etzer Vilaire	SOLUTION	340	1.92		
Edmond Henry Jude	Mouvement Independent Kitirel Social Economie ak Politik an Ayiti	333	1.88		
Pierre Marc Wood	Ligue Dessalinienne	325	1.83		
Legros Ronald	Parti de la Diaspora Haïtienne pour Haïti	322	1.82		
Jn Baptiste M'zou Naya Belange	Platfòm Peyizan	321	1.81		
Similien Joel	Pont	313	1.77		
Perard Gasner	KONFYANS	294	1.66		
Petion Nader	Mouvement Progressiste pour l'Avancement des Masses	290	1.64		
Saint-Juste Benel	Socialist Action Movement	282	1.59		
Dorismond Beauvy	Rapwoche	273	1.54		
Georges Reginald	Struggling People's Organization	224	1.26		
Theagene Jean Ronald	Cohesion Nationale des Partis Politiques Haïtiens	224	1.26		
Faustin Lyonel	Platfòm Pitit Desalin	214	1.21		
Devallon Elionor	Parti pour la Libération des Masses et d'Intégration Sociale	209	1.18		
Charles Richardson	Parti pour l'Evolution Nationale Haïtienne	204	1.15		
Colastin Sanon	Tèt Ansanm	194	1.09		
Desroches Roberto	Parti Populaire National	192	1.08		
Guirand Riviere	Rassemblement des Nationaux Démocrates Volontaires pour l'Unité Salvatrice	179	1.01		
Petit-Frere Nadege	Plateforme Politique Antre Nou	165	0.93		
Clerge Audrey	Kombit Liberasyon Ekonomik	161	0.91		
Theocrate Beauvoir	BLOC 20	144	0.81		
Rossignol Gaston Georges Elise	Pati Kreyol Nou Ye	105	0.59		
Othello Herman	Mouvement Patriotique Populaire Dessalinien	105	0.59		
Nelson Michel Nodier	Parti Démocratique Institutionaliste	91	0.51		
Orgeat Michel	Christian Movement for a New Haiti	91	0.51		
Louis Pierre Eddshell	Front Civico-Politique Haïtien	85	0.48		
Luzaire Jean Guichard	Consortium National des Partis Politiques Haïtiens	84	0.47		
Sainvil Frantz	Veye Yo	79	0.45		
Lundor Fritzner	Mouvement National Haïtien	77	0.43		
Balthazar John Nobenson	Federalist Party	76	0.43		
Mars Jean Alex	Plan d'Action Citoyenne	72	0.41		
Darant Bickenson	Union Nationale des Démocrates Haïtiens	31	0.17		
Sanon Ronald	Olahh Baton Jenes La	11	0.06		
None of the above		308	1.74	1,990	6.19
Total		17,733	100.00	32,168	100.00
Valid votes		17,733	92.00	32,168	90.32
Invalid/blank votes		1,543	8.00	3,448	9.68
Total votes		19,276	100.00	35,616	100.00

Tabarre
Candidate	Party	First round 9 August 2015		Second round 25 October 2015	
Candidate	Party	Votes	%	Votes	%
Desrameaux Caleb J.	Vérité	1,589	21.15	11,187	60.87
Estime Maxene	Mouvement National des Citoyens	828	11.02	6,568	35.74
Guillaume Jean Ramfils	Christian Democratic Party of Haiti	761	10.13		
Pierre-Louis Yves	Fanmi Lavalas	669	8.90		
Auguste Harycidas	Alternative League for Haitian Progress and Emancipation	651	8.66		
Chevalier Jean Renaud	Rassemblement des Nationaux Démocrates Volontaires pour l'Unité Salvatrice	552	7.35		
Fleurissaint Jean Claude	Platfòm Peyizan	470	6.26		
Joseph Leroy Wood	Fusion of Haitian Social Democrats	372	4.95		
Franklin Thelord	Haitian Tèt Kale Party	248	3.30		
Sanon Herby	CANAAN	218	2.90		
Ladouceur Alcius	Platfòm Pitit Desalin	208	2.77		
Moreau John Fritz	PPG18	180	2.40		
Forges Abraham	MRA	152	2.02		
Charles Levelt	Pont	126	1.68		
Jovin Francisco	Renmen Ayiti	113	1.50		
Formule Jean	Rapwoche	97	1.29		
Pierre Wesley	Veye Yo	69	0.92		
Jean Louis Regine	Pati Politik Fanm ak Fanmi	67	0.89		
None of the above		143	1.90	623	3.39
Total		7,513	100.00	18,378	100.00
Valid votes		7,513	95.38	18,378	91.34
Invalid/blank votes		364	4.62	1,742	8.66
Total votes		7,877	100.00	20,120	100.00

Thomazeau
Candidate	Party	First round 9 August 2015		Second round 25 October 2015	
Candidate	Party	Votes	%	Votes	%
Cyprien Price	Haitian Tèt Kale Party	1,998	27.68	5,683	67.29
Fenelus Rosvel Noelus	Fanmi Lavalas	1,175	16.28	2,717	32.17
Joseph Alix	KONFYANS	819	11.35		
Romain Cheker	Inite Patriyotik	552	7.65		
Jean Josmar	Consortium National des Partis Politiques Haïtiens	382	5.29		
Nicolas Ducarmel	PPG18	351	4.86		
Elony Michelet	Plateforme Jistis	319	4.42		
Charles Roland	Struggling People's Organization	303	4.20		
Occeus Wilkens	Vérité	242	3.35		
Luca Napoleon Chrislie	Renmen Ayiti	181	2.51		
Jean Dieuner	Konvansyon Inite Demokratik	160	2.22		
Herard Ketlie	Mouvement Patriotique Populaire Dessalinien	146	2.02		
Elius Chrisner	CANAAN	142	1.97		
Jean Asca	Platfòm Pitit Desalin	103	1.43		
Massillon Gesner	Christian National Union for the Reconstruction of Haiti	87	1.21		
St Louisme Joel	Rapwoche	83	1.15		
Edme Edzer	Concorde Nationale	65	0.90		
Cadesca Winseul	Fusion of Haitian Social Democrats	47	0.65		
Michel Jean Pierre Raoul	Kombit Travaye Peyizan pou Libere Ayiti	13	0.18		
None of the above		51	0.71	45	0.53
Total		7,219	100.00	8,445	100.00
Valid votes		7,219	93.16	8,445	95.82
Invalid/blank votes		530	6.84	368	4.18
Total votes		7,749	100.00	8,813	100.00

Election results by constituency in Sud

Aquin
Candidate	Party	First round 9 August 2015		Second round 25 October 2015	
Candidate	Party	Votes	%	Votes	%
Bosse Jean-Robert	Struggling People's Organization	2,282	19.47	6,329	51.56
Andre Antoine	Vérité	2,118	18.07	5,891	47.99
Edouard Jean Robert	Reseau National Bouclier	1,399	11.94		
Mathurin Jean Garry	Haitian Tèt Kale Party	1,324	11.30		
Pompe Mauril	Konvansyon Inite Demokratik	1,038	8.86		
Comeau Marie-Danielle	Kombit Travaye Peyizan pou Libere Ayiti	1,019	8.69		
Fevry Onel	Alternative League for Haitian Progress and Emancipation	664	5.67		
Laude Fritz Gerald	Christian National Union for the Reconstruction of Haiti	621	5.30		
Noradin Wadlin	Respect	609	5.20		
Bosse Danise	PPG18	186	1.59		
Castor Jean Edny	Fanmi Lavalas	143	1.22		
Jean-Louis Enock	Platfòm Pitit Desalin	120	1.02		
Joseph Guillaume	Renmen Ayiti	101	0.86		
Charlotin Mario	Mouvement Patriotique Populaire Dessalinien	29	0.25		
None of the above		67	0.57	56	0.46
Total		11,720	100.00	12,276	100.00
Valid votes		11,720	96.28	12,276	97.72
Invalid/blank votes		453	3.72	286	2.28
Total votes		12,173	100.00	12,562	100.00

Camp-Perrin/Maniche
Candidate	Party	First round 9 August 2015		Second round 25 October 2015		Second round rerun 20 November 2016	
Candidate	Party	Votes	%	Votes	%	Votes	%
Augustin Bertin	Vérité	2,295	18.93	8,308	54.98	6,465	66.53
Pierre Ogline	Haitian Tèt Kale Party	2,173	17.92	6,659	44.06		
Lovince Jean Wilfrid	Reseau National Bouclier	2,044	16.86			3,195	32.88
Calvaire Kenold	Fanmi Lavalas	1,853	15.28				
Constant Lenonce	Haitian Republican Party	1,144	9.43				
Gustave Jean Dunes	Veye Yo	801	6.61				
Thomas Robert	PPG18	610	5.03				
Louizaire Jean Alexis	Christian National Union for the Reconstruction of Haiti	509	4.20				
Chery Nobert	Entente Nationale des Travailleurs pour le Reveil d'Haïti	263	2.17				
Desruisseaux Pierre Claude	Action Démocratie pour Bâtir Haïti	261	2.15				
Mesidor Eddy	Platfòm Pitit Desalin	103	0.85				
Delimon Pierre Donald	Fusion of Haitian Social Democrats	35	0.29				
None of the above		35	0.29	145	0.96	58	0.60
Total		12,126	100.00	15,112	100.00	9,718	100.00
Valid votes		12,126	91.75	15,112	95.28	9,718	92.85
Invalid/blank votes		1,090	8.25	748	4.72	748	7.15
Total votes		13,216	100.00	15,860	100.00	10,466	100.00

Cavaillon
Candidate	Party	First round 9 August 2015		Second round 25 October 2015	
Candidate	Party	Votes	%	Votes	%
Olivier Wuinchel	Alternative League for Haitian Progress and Emancipation	1,971	27.20	4,830	47.77
Delia Delinois	Vérité	1,695	23.40	5,257	52.00
Martelly Sabine Renaude	Haitian Tèt Kale Party	1,151	15.89		
Jocelyn Fanese Cima	Platfòm Peyizan	683	9.43		
Edouard Guito	Fanmi Lavalas	499	6.89		
Lafond Ernst Michel-Ange	Struggling People's Organization	206	2.84		
Larosiliere Jeams Stuart	Platfòm Pitit Desalin	178	2.46		
Mathurin Jean Onest	Renmen Ayiti	152	2.10		
Etienne Milfort	Konsyans Patriyotik	130	1.79		
Jean-Juste Patrick	Aksyon pou Konstwi yon Ayiti Oganize	123	1.70		
Renous Bertony	Fusion of Haitian Social Democrats	122	1.68		
Joseph Djymptz	Rassemblement des Nationaux Démocrates Volontaires pour l'Unité Salvatrice	108	1.49		
Jabouin Giraud	PPG18	85	1.17		
Macius Rigal	Force Unite Nationale	59	0.81		
Fleurine Prudent	Mouvement National Haïtien	49	0.68		
Neya Franky	Pati Politik Fanm ak Fanmi	20	0.28		
None of the above		14	0.19	23	0.23
Total		7,245	100.00	10,110	100.00
Valid votes		7,245	92.83	10,110	96.76
Invalid/blank votes		560	7.17	339	3.24
Total votes		7,805	100.00	10,449	100.00

Chardonnieres/Les Anglais
Candidate	Party	First round 9 August 2015		Second round 25 October 2015	
Candidate	Party	Votes	%	Votes	%
Lisma Jean Romelus	Vérité	2,375	23.19	5,535	43.50
Charles Jean Galvy	Haitian Tèt Kale Party	2,253	22.00	7,118	55.95
Aubourg Marcelin	Inite Patriyotik	1,410	13.77		
Michel Rosewald	Renmen Ayiti	992	9.69		
Hibart Alix Denis	Pont	974	9.51		
Pajet Vanette	Fanmi Lavalas	515	5.03		
Jean-Pierre Jephte	Fusion of Haitian Social Democrats	372	3.63		
Alexandre Motlet	Union des Patriotes pour l'Avancement National	343	3.35		
Altimé Pierre Marie	Kombit Travaye Peyizan pou Libere Ayiti	218	2.13		
Joseph Enock	Alternative League for Haitian Progress and Emancipation	192	1.88		
Chamblain Louis Jodel	PPG18	152	1.48		
Poupas Wagler	Rassemblement des Nationaux Démocrates Volontaires pour l'Unité Salvatrice	98	0.96		
Raphael Alex Jean	Konvansyon Inite Demokratik	97	0.95		
Berjuste Jean M. Reynold	Platfòm Pitit Desalin	80	0.78		
Cherime Cherilorme	Front Uni pour la Renaissance d'Haïti	52	0.51		
None of the above		117	1.14	70	0.55
Total		10,240	100.00	12,723	100.00
Valid votes		10,240	88.87	12,723	94.73
Invalid/blank votes		1,283	11.13	708	5.27
Total votes		11,523	100.00	13,431	100.00

Coteaux
Candidate	Party	First round 9 August 2015		Second round 25 October 2015	
Candidate	Party	Votes	%	Votes	%
Dorismond Beonard	Vérité	1,944	45.18	3,086	56.40
Dolne Astrel	Haitian Tèt Kale Party	1,366	31.75	2,382	43.53
Joint Jean Remy	Fusion of Haitian Social Democrats	728	16.92		
St Jean Jacques	Konvansyon Inite Demokratik	132	3.07		
Desir Paulo	Fanmi Lavalas	118	2.74		
None of the above		15	0.35	4	0.07
Total		4,303	100.00	5,472	100.00
Valid votes		4,303	96.37	5,472	98.70
Invalid/blank votes		162	3.63	72	1.30
Total votes		4,465	100.00	5,544	100.00

Les Cayes/Ile-A-Vache
Candidate	Party	First round 9 August 2015		Second round 25 October 2015	
Candidate	Party	Votes	%	Votes	%
Simon Max Antoine	Haitian Tèt Kale Party	3,636	16.49	13,111	43.54
Robas Clauvy	Struggling People's Organization	3,006	13.63	16,675	55.38
Delerme Cyril Yverick	Pont	1,815	8.23		
Viliom Jean Odinel	Vérité	1,730	7.85		
Zamor Jacques Mildor	PPG18	1,598	7.25		
Celestin Soniel	Platfòm Peyizan	1,572	7.13		
Cyrion Anthony	Konvansyon Inite Demokratik	1,426	6.47		
Joseph Pierre Serge	Inite Patriyotik	1,074	4.87		
Constant Jean Francois Ralph	Renmen Ayiti	853	3.87		
Pierre-Louis Michelet	CANAAN	707	3.21		
Louis Wilson Thelimo	Christian Democratic Party of Haiti	614	2.78		
St Juste Jean Senel	Socialist Action Movement	476	2.16		
Lubin Adler	Union des Patriotes pour l'Avancement National	443	2.01		
Philosca Jean Bossuet	Respect	430	1.95		
Sénat Joël	Christian Movement for a New Haiti	424	1.92		
Elisma Jean Denis	Mouvement National des Citoyens	408	1.85		
Metellus Adline	Veye Yo	384	1.74		
Yacinthe Joseph Eugene	Fusion of Haitian Social Democrats	258	1.17		
Charles Baussuet	Christian National Union for the Reconstruction of Haiti	249	1.13		
Thys Miaud	Ansanm Patriyot pou Lavni Ayiti	247	1.12		
Cadet Pierre Gerard	Platfòm Pitit Desalin	176	0.80		
Alphonse Pierre Sergo	Pati Politik Fanm ak Fanmi	127	0.58		
Clermont Josue	Konsyans Patriyotik	80	0.36		
Staco Jean Marie Lesley	Mouvement pour l'Instauration de la Démocratie en Haïti	47	0.21		
Mauvais Frantz Arthur	Alternative League for Haitian Progress and Emancipation	25	0.11		
None of the above		247	1.12	324	1.08
Total		22,052	100.00	30,110	100.00
Valid votes		22,052	95.17	30,110	93.82
Invalid/blank votes		1,118	4.83	1,982	6.18
Total votes		23,170	100.00	32,092	100.00

Port-A-Piment
Candidate	Party	First round 25 October 2015		Second round 20 November 2016	
Candidate	Party	Votes	%	Votes	%
Laine Julner	Vérité	2,421	46.87	1,978	47.80
Letang Daniel	Konvansyon Inite Demokratik	2,321	44.94	2,157	52.13
Gilomme Jean Glaude	PPG18	387	7.49		
Elysee John	Platfòm Pitit Desalin	14	0.27		
Guerrier Pierre Edward Fils	Fanmi Lavalas	10	0.19		
Marsan Berthony Joseph	Struggling People's Organization	2	0.04		
Montinor Romain	Renmen Ayiti	1	0.02		
None of the above		9	0.17	3	0.07
Total		5,165	100.00	4,138	100.00
Valid votes		5,165	97.75	4,138	98.76
Invalid/blank votes		119	2.25	52	1.24
Total votes		5,284	100.00	4,190	100.00

Port-Salut
Candidate	Party	First round 9 August 2015		Second round 25 October 2015	
Candidate	Party	Votes	%	Votes	%
Saintil Maxime	Haitian Tèt Kale Party	1,627	24.91	4,298	47.33
Sinal Bertrand	Fanmi Lavalas	1,579	24.17	4,753	52.34
Pierre Louis Joseph Nelson	Konvansyon Inite Demokratik	1,410	21.59		
Nazaire Rene	Vérité	1,264	19.35		
Maurice Joseph Enoc	Alliance Démocratique pour la Reconciliation Nationale	536	8.21		
Gregoire Samuel	Konsyans Patriyotik	68	1.04		
Nannuel Jean Alex	Fusion of Haitian Social Democrats	25	0.38		
None of the above		23	0.35	30	0.33
Total		6,532	100.00	9,081	100.00
Valid votes		6,532	96.33	9,081	98.51
Invalid/blank votes		249	3.67	137	1.49
Total votes		6,781	100.00	9,218	100.00

Roche-A-Bateau
Candidate	Party	First round 9 August 2015		Second round 25 October 2015	
Candidate	Party	Votes	%	Votes	%
Ostin Pierre-Louis	Haitian Tèt Kale Party	1,220	27.11	2,559	56.49
Richard Paul Olivar	Vérité	1,050	23.33	1,963	43.33
Mulard Jean Marie	Fanmi Lavalas	995	22.11		
Branche D'homme Onald	Inite Patriyotik	469	10.42		
Moise Anes	Konvansyon Inite Demokratik	368	8.18		
Termelus Nixon	Rapwoche	325	7.22		
Lazarre Neslie	Struggling People's Organization	33	0.73		
None of the above		41	0.91	8	0.18
Total		4,501	100.00	4,530	100.00
Valid votes		4,501	90.65	4,530	96.67
Invalid/blank votes		464	9.35	156	3.33
Total votes		4,965	100.00	4,686	100.00

Saint Jean Du Sud/Arniquet
Candidate	Party	First round 9 August 2015		Second round 25 October 2015	
Candidate	Party	Votes	%	Votes	%
Laguerre Joseph Benoit	Haitian Tèt Kale Party	2,647	30.43	5,464	53.64
Boisrond Jean Roland	Christian National Union for the Reconstruction of Haiti	1,690	19.43	4,461	43.79
Bernard Jean Claude	Struggling People's Organization	1,601	18.40		
Pierre-Louis Serge	Konvansyon Inite Demokratik	899	10.33		
Astremon Joseph Georges	Platfòm Pitit Desalin	792	9.10		
Jean Yves Joseph	Fusion of Haitian Social Democrats	232	2.67		
Policart Harry	Rapwoche	199	2.29		
Placide Louis Daniel	Platfòm Peyizan	159	1.83		
Esperance Jean Duce	Fanmi Lavalas	151	1.74		
Muscadain Ronald	Force Unite Nationale	105	1.21		
Jean Claude Marie Venise	PPG18	92	1.06		
Solage Pierre Michelet	Action Démocratie pour Bâtir Haïti	44	0.51		
Marion Maxime	Respect	34	0.39		
None of the above		55	0.63	262	2.57
Total		8,700	100.00	10,187	100.00
Valid votes		8,700	96.23	10,187	95.75
Invalid/blank votes		341	3.77	452	4.25
Total votes		9,041	100.00	10,639	100.00

Saint-Louis-Du-Sud
Candidate	Party	First round 9 August 2015		Second round 25 October 2015	
Candidate	Party	Votes	%	Votes	%
Dorfeuille Gandhy	Haitian Tèt Kale Party	3,091	26.75	7,309	55.85
Mervius Felix-Jean	Fusion of Haitian Social Democrats	1,439	12.46	5,704	43.59
Sanon Jeannot	Fanmi Lavalas	709	6.14		
Dorfeuille Christma	Reseau National Bouclier	709	6.14		
Cherizier Monet	Front Uni pour la Renaissance d'Haïti	676	5.85		
Exellent Gerald	Konvansyon Inite Demokratik	630	5.45		
Altimo Jean Samuel	Renmen Ayiti	503	4.35		
Julneus Diesnel	Parti de la Diaspora Haïtienne pour Haïti	488	4.22		
Jean Baptiste Laveaux	Socialist Action Movement	486	4.21		
Pierre Frantz Michel Junior	Christian National Union for the Reconstruction of Haiti	478	4.14		
Cyrill Wilfrid	Rassemblement des Nationaux Démocrates Volontaires pour l'Unité Salvatrice	359	3.11		
Doreus Pierre Renaud	Consortium National des Partis Politiques Haïtiens	345	2.99		
Louis Francois	Force Unite Nationale	279	2.41		
Georges Lisage	ATERI	238	2.06		
Castor Sonet	Inite Patriyotik	220	1.90		
Altidor Daniel	CANAAN	138	1.19		
Nicolas Ony	Pont	122	1.06		
Merise Yvens	Parti pour la Libération des Masses et d'Intégration Sociale	121	1.05		
Nelson Stephanie	Vérité	121	1.05		
Romelus Maxo	Platfòm Pitit Desalin	113	0.98		
Duvivier Louis Yvon	Pati Politik Fanm ak Fanmi	103	0.89		
Jeudy Yves Jules	Concorde Nationale	55	0.48		
Sainval Erick	PPG18	28	0.24		
Sama Bermann	Regroupement Patriotique pour le Renouveau National	24	0.21		
None of the above		78	0.68	73	0.56
Total		11,553	100.00	13,086	100.00
Valid votes		11,553	93.16	13,086	95.29
Invalid/blank votes		848	6.84	647	4.71
Total votes		12,401	100.00	13,733	100.00

Tiburon
Candidate	Party	First round 9 August 2015		Second round 25 October 2015	
Candidate	Party	Votes	%	Votes	%
Saintima Louinor	Vérité	1,603	30.05	2,770	45.70
Belisaire Jean Philippe	Haitian Tèt Kale Party	1,479	27.72	3,286	54.22
Leone Jean Orcel	Konvansyon Inite Demokratik	1,006	18.86		
Joseph William	Respect	261	4.89		
Germain Erlain	Consortium National des Partis Politiques Haïtiens	256	4.80		
Felissaint Renaud Eddy	Alternative League for Haitian Progress and Emancipation	241	4.52		
Cherisme Evens	Veye Yo	240	4.50		
Desjardins Jocelin	Fusion of Haitian Social Democrats	141	2.64		
Alcime Frantz	Struggling People's Organization	107	2.01		
None of the above		1	0.02	5	0.08
Total		5,335	100.00	6,061	100.00
Valid votes		5,335	87.03	6,061	96.31
Invalid/blank votes		795	12.97	232	3.69
Total votes		6,130	100.00	6,293	100.00

Torbeck/Chantal
Candidate	Party	First round 9 August 2015		Second round 25 October 2015	
Candidate	Party	Votes	%	Votes	%
Charles Herve	Haitian Tèt Kale Party	2,855	20.69	11,095	61.29
Georges Guy Gerard	Fanmi Lavalas	2,411	17.47	6,843	37.80
Denis Pierre Lima	Respect	1,858	13.46		
Dimanche Jean Mertens	Konvansyon Inite Demokratik	1,202	8.71		
Mathieu Patrice	Rapwoche	877	6.36		
Pierre Louis Nadege	Vérité	837	6.07		
Duclaire Frede	Ansanm Patriyot pou Lavni Ayiti	620	4.49		
Felix Jean Ronald	Renmen Ayiti	530	3.84		
Desgazons Pierre Antoine Giro	Veye Yo	404	2.93		
Frimer Jean Pierrot	Pati Politik Fanm ak Fanmi	349	2.53		
Chery Guy-Marie	Platfòm Pitit Desalin	347	2.51		
Jean Pierre Rose Juna	Platfòm Peyizan	313	2.27		
Nicolas Jean Genel	Mouvement National Haïtien	200	1.45		
St Paul Marc Jenner	Parti Agricole Haïtien	174	1.26		
Tervil Pierre Rigeaud	Fusion of Haitian Social Democrats	173	1.25		
Mentor Alann	Socialist Action Movement	107	0.78		
Jean Francois Joseph Alain	Kombit Liberasyon Ekonomik	106	0.77		
Pierre Jean Brunel	Alliance Démocratique pour la Reconciliation Nationale	97	0.70		
Hector Pierre Faustin	Entente Nationale des Travailleurs pour le Reveil d'Haïti	92	0.67		
Francois Jacques Alphonse	Retabli Ayiti	84	0.61		
Pierre Geordany	Nouvelle Haïti	80	0.58		
Larieux Jean Zachary	PPG18	41	0.30		
None of the above		42	0.30	164	0.91
Total		13,799	100.00	18,102	100.00
Valid votes		13,799	92.86	18,102	95.18
Invalid/blank votes		1,061	7.14	916	4.82
Total votes		14,860	100.00	19,018	100.00

Election results by constituency in Sud Est

Anse-A-Pitre
Candidate	Party	First round 9 August 2015		Second round 25 October 2015	
Candidate	Party	Votes	%	Votes	%
Pierre Bel-Ange	Fusion of Haitian Social Democrats	2,353	35.19	4,040	55.66
Marcelin Onell	Vérité	1,767	26.42	3,169	43.66
Robasson Patrick	Haitian Tèt Kale Party	1,760	26.32		
Sanozier Remy	Christian National Union for the Reconstruction of Haiti	389	5.82		
Claude Ricardo	Renmen Ayiti	146	2.18		
Andris Pierre Clamane	Fanmi Lavalas	85	1.27		
Gabriel Marie-Carmel	Force Démocratique Haïtien Intégré	74	1.11		
None of the above		113	1.69	50	0.69
Total		6,687	100.00	7,259	100.00
Valid votes		6,687	92.82	7,259	95.19
Invalid/blank votes		517	7.18	367	4.81
Total votes		7,204	100.00	7,626	100.00

Bainet
Candidate	Party	First round 9 August 2015		Second round 25 October 2015	
Candidate	Party	Votes	%	Votes	%
Francois Malherbe	Haitian Tèt Kale Party	3,994	34.22	5,052	39.33
Cabe Sony	Konvansyon Inite Demokratik	3,814	32.68	7,747	60.31
Laplante Karl	Renmen Ayiti	1,144	9.80		
Sylvaince Nelan	Fusion of Haitian Social Democrats	808	6.92		
Marcelin Jean Sagaille	Struggling People's Organization	697	5.97		
Lexis Osner	Reseau National Bouclier	413	3.54		
Panier Jean Robert	Ansanm Patriyot pou Lavni Ayiti	221	1.89		
Milord Marie Elizabethe	Pont	220	1.89		
Metelus Jean Joseph	Platfòm Pitit Desalin	189	1.62		
None of the above		170	1.46	46	0.36
Total		11,670	100.00	12,845	100.00
Valid votes		11,670	88.21	12,845	92.63
Invalid/blank votes		1,560	11.79	1,022	7.37
Total votes		13,230	100.00	13,867	100.00

Belle-Anse
Candidate	Party	First round 9 August 2015		Second round 25 October 2015	
Candidate	Party	Votes	%	Votes	%
Mathieu Vilma	Haiti in Action	1,489	23.06	4,595	51.93
Jean-Pierre Rossini	Haitian Tèt Kale Party	1,327	20.55	4,194	47.40
Baltazar Clebert	Struggling People's Organization	958	14.83		
Sistanis Jean Ronel	Fusion of Haitian Social Democrats	500	7.74		
Petion Henry Sauveur	Alliance Démocratique pour la Reconciliation Nationale	473	7.32		
Pascal Marius	Vérité	419	6.49		
Thibaud Unick	Renmen Ayiti	318	4.92		
Alcinfils Diomeka	Concorde Nationale	315	4.88		
Figaro Jean Calmar	Fanmi Lavalas	186	2.88		
Benoit Gerard	Platfòm Pitit Desalin	181	2.80		
Louis-Meme Jean Wilson	Socialist Action Movement	150	2.32		
None of the above		142	2.20	59	0.67
Total		6,458	100.00	8,848	100.00
Valid votes		6,458	87.35	8,848	93.69
Invalid/blank votes		935	12.65	596	6.31
Total votes		7,393	100.00	9,444	100.00

Cayes Jacmel
Candidate	Party	First round 9 August 2015		Second round 25 October 2015	
Candidate	Party	Votes	%	Votes	%
Dubreuze Pierre Roosvelt	Struggling People's Organization	2,313	25.66	4,483	41.93
Mercredy Jean Benissoit	Alternative League for Haitian Progress and Emancipation	1,937	21.49	6,190	57.90
Charles Kenol	Haitian Tèt Kale Party	1,381	15.32		
Pyram Wilda	Platfòm Pitit Desalin	1,090	12.09		
Felix Jean Delouis	Vérité	805	8.93		
Cesar Pierre Andre	Renmen Ayiti	730	8.10		
Joseph Fernand	Ansanm Patriyot pou Lavni Ayiti	300	3.33		
Fils Jean Hernès	Fanmi Lavalas	147	1.63		
Fils Jean Michel	Nouvelle Haïti	108	1.20		
Saint Germain Gayseem Numidia	Delivrans	76	0.84		
Mercredy Patrick	Fusion of Haitian Social Democrats	53	0.59		
None of the above		73	0.81	18	0.17
Total		9,013	100.00	10,691	100.00
Valid votes		9,013	94.54	10,691	95.40
Invalid/blank votes		521	5.46	516	4.60
Total votes		9,534	100.00	11,207	100.00

Cote-De-Fer
Candidate	Party	First round 9 August 2015		Second round 20 November 2016	
Candidate	Party	Votes	%	Votes	%
Devil Roudy	Struggling People's Organization	3,374	30.04	6,525	64.00
Guirand Lesly	Haitian Tèt Kale Party	3,116	27.74	3,625	35.55
Louis Joseph Gontran	Vérité	2,529	22.52		
Baptiste Jean Georges	Concorde Nationale	825	7.35		
Orleans Rosemond	Fusion of Haitian Social Democrats	569	5.07		
Vergeon Sandro	Renmen Ayiti	408	3.63		
Etienne Franck	Pont	273	2.43		
Adme Adinel	Platfòm Pitit Desalin	69	0.61		
None of the above		69	0.61	46	0.45
Total		11,232	100.00	10,196	100.00
Valid votes		11,232	91.32	10,196	93.57
Invalid/blank votes		1,067	8.68	701	6.43
Total votes		12,299	100.00	10,897	100.00

Grand-Gosier
Candidate	Party	First round 9 August 2015		Second round 25 October 2015	
Candidate	Party	Votes	%	Votes	%
Vil Paul Hermann	Haitian Tèt Kale Party	764	29.04	2,009	50.71
Charles Jean Onel	Struggling People's Organization	566	21.51	1,876	47.35
Antoine Eddy	Vérité	432	16.42		
Charles Jean Colbert	Renmen Ayiti	255	9.69		
Lafleur Yves Arold	Platfòm Pitit Desalin	147	5.59		
Rabel Therry	Fanmi Lavalas	129	4.90		
Verneret Jean-Guiteau	Alternative League for Haitian Progress and Emancipation	96	3.65		
Jean Batard Hygeins	Ansanm Patriyot pou Lavni Ayiti	71	2.70		
Gaetan Nazon	Fusion of Haitian Social Democrats	56	2.13		
Jean Babylor	Christian National Union for the Reconstruction of Haiti	28	1.06		
Bouzi Dejulien	Konvansyon Inite Demokratik	25	0.95		
None of the above		62	2.36	77	1.94
Total		2,631	100.00	3,962	100.00
Valid votes		2,631	91.61	3,962	97.51
Invalid/blank votes		241	8.39	101	2.49
Total votes		2,872	100.00	4,063	100.00

Jacmel
Candidate	Party	First round 9 August 2015		Second round 25 October 2015	
Candidate	Party	Votes	%	Votes	%
Jean-Philippe Ketel	Struggling People's Organization	7,122	29.54	20,508	65.76
Khawly Pierre Jacques Junior	Haitian Tèt Kale Party	6,216	25.78	10,453	33.52
Domond Patrick	Konvansyon Inite Demokratik	3,185	13.21		
Jean Baptiste Germy Emmanuel Muschi	Aksyon pou Konstwi yon Ayiti Oganize	883	3.66		
Jean Mary Louiner	Fanmi Lavalas	861	3.57		
Badio Ilfrance	Renmen Ayiti	725	3.01		
Derolus Miguel	Alternative League for Haitian Progress and Emancipation	659	2.73		
Michel Etzer	Retabli Ayiti	559	2.32		
Laurent Andre Wilner	Vérité	414	1.72		
Colin Frantzces	Plateforme Jistis	352	1.46		
Christophe Edvard	Konbit pou Ayiti	345	1.43		
Agena Raynold	PPG18	333	1.38		
Cetoute Roumano-Becker	Concorde Nationale	311	1.29		
Derisier Yves	Fusion of Haitian Social Democrats	309	1.28		
Antoine Rony	Platfòm Pitit Desalin	285	1.18		
Petit-Frere Jean Benissoit	Pont	262	1.09		
Jean Arlain	Parti de la Diaspora Haïtienne pour Haïti	227	0.94		
Pierre Lucien	Christian Movement for a New Haiti	168	0.70		
David Claude	Ansanm Patriyot pou Lavni Ayiti	149	0.62		
Marddy Ronald	Force Unite Nationale	130	0.54		
Jean Pierre Pierre-Michel Joseph	UNIR-AYITI INI	122	0.51		
David Emmanuel Michel	Mobilisation pour le Progrès d'Haïti	115	0.48		
St Hilaire Jean Guychard	Respect	60	0.25		
Pierre Roland	Entente Nationale des Travailleurs pour le Reveil d'Haïti	57	0.24		
None of the above		259	1.07	224	0.72
Total		24,108	100.00	31,185	100.00
Valid votes		24,108	91.37	31,185	95.04
Invalid/blank votes		2,277	8.63	1,628	4.96
Total votes		26,385	100.00	32,813	100.00

La Vallee De Jacmel
Candidate	Party	First round 9 August 2015		Second round 25 October 2015	
Candidate	Party	Votes	%	Votes	%
Ambroise Nestor	Reseau National Bouclier	1,014	16.06	3,585	49.94
Joseph Yvrance	Ansanm Patriyot pou Lavni Ayiti	951	15.06		
Lauture Franck	Struggling People's Organization	938	14.86	3,517	48.99
Valentin Jean Edzer	Haitian Tèt Kale Party	937	14.84		
Gabriel Justa	Pont	834	13.21		
Labbe Ruffine	Vérité	498	7.89		
Aridou Frantz Ceau	PPG18	374	5.92		
Geffrard Jean Vilco	Fanmi Lavalas	216	3.42		
Affricot Jean Baptiste	Konvansyon Inite Demokratik	137	2.17		
Compere Ernst	Renmen Ayiti	100	1.58		
Zephir Michel	ATERI	90	1.43		
Lauture Jean Mario	Platfòm Pitit Desalin	76	1.20		
Royal Mimose Andre	Fusion of Haitian Social Democrats	68	1.08		
Content Jean Marc	Konbit Sitwayen	29	0.46		
Joassaint Fequiere	Retabli Ayiti	11	0.17		
None of the above		41	0.65	77	1.07
Total		6,314	100.00	7,179	100.00
Valid votes		6,314	90.34	7,179	96.53
Invalid/blank votes		675	9.66	258	3.47
Total votes		6,989	100.00	7,437	100.00

Marigot
Candidate	Party	First round 9 August 2015		First round rerun 25 October 2015		Second round 20 November 2016	
Candidate	Party	Votes	%	Votes	%	Votes	%
Lherisson Dieudonne	Haitian Tèt Kale Party	981	24.01	2,904	26.21	4,852	52.54
Deronneth Deus	Pont	689	16.87	2,519	22.74	4,351	47.11
Gustave Rosenie	Fanmi Lavalas	515	12.61	1,812	16.36		
Poustin Gethene	Struggling People's Organization	635	15.54	1,207	10.90		
Pascal Yolande Jean Baptiste	Ansanm Patriyot pou Lavni Ayiti	233	5.70	981	8.86		
Severe Getho	Vérité	277	6.78	805	7.27		
Jeudy Moril	Kombit Travaye Peyizan pou Libere Ayiti	194	4.75	225	2.03		
Pierre Frantzo	Entente Nationale des Travailleurs pour le Reveil d'Haïti	80	1.96	222	2.00		
Rousseau Job Emmanuel Rigaud	Platfòm Pitit Desalin	87	2.13	109	0.98		
Senatus Altame	Mouvement Progressiste pour l'Avancement des Masses	130	3.18	95	0.86		
Michel Phareo	Retabli Ayiti	71	1.74	87	0.79		
Marechal Julio	Socialist Action Movement	41	1.00	76	0.69		
Silmerite Jeudy	Fusion of Haitian Social Democrats	65	1.59	36	0.32		
Moise Frantz	Alliance Démocratique pour la Reconciliation Nationale	15	0.37				
None of the above		72	1.76			32	0.35
Total		4,085	100.00	11,078	100.00	9,235	100.00
Valid votes		4,085	87.25			9,235	91.20
Invalid/blank votes		597	12.75			891	8.80
Total votes		4,682	100.00			10,126	100.00

Thiotte
Candidate	Party	First round 9 August 2015		Second round 25 October 2015	
Candidate	Party	Votes	%	Votes	%
Garnier Vikerson	Fanmi Lavalas	1,471	24.01	4,950	56.29
Cazeau Harmel	Struggling People's Organization	1,154	18.84	3,797	43.18
Desmarattes Jean Camille	Haitian Tèt Kale Party	1,022	16.68		
Batrony Johny Deeb	Alternative League for Haitian Progress and Emancipation	904	14.76		
Neptune Jean Ked	Christian National Union for the Reconstruction of Haiti	767	12.52		
Jean Jean Robert	Platfòm Pitit Desalin	519	8.47		
Sanon Loubio	Ansanm Patriyot pou Lavni Ayiti	186	3.04		
Valescot Frankee	Renmen Ayiti	80	1.31		
None of the above		23	0.38	46	0.52
Total		6,126	100.00	8,793	100.00
Valid votes		6,126	89.68	8,793	95.81
Invalid/blank votes		705	10.32	385	4.19
Total votes		6,831	100.00	9,178	100.00

=== Senate ===
Party	First round			First round rerun			Second round			Total seats
Party	Votes	%	Seats	Votes	%	Seats	Votes	%	Seats	Total seats
Vérité	234,018	14.91	0	38,273	7.91	0	648,744	34.46	3	3
Haitian Tèt Kale Party	221,704	14.12	0	127,661	26.37	0	367,071	19.50	5	5
Fanmi Lavalas	113,356	7.22	0	14,009	2.89	0	102,288	5.43	1	1
Ligue Dessalinienne	101,884	6.49	1							1
Convention for Democratic Unity	93,594	5.96	0	6,185	1.28	0	196,907	10.46	3	3
Reseau National Bouclier	92,560	5.90	0	97,425	20.13	0	152,491	8.10	1	1
Platfòm Pitit Desalin	91,229	5.81	0	31,284	6.46	0	71,298	3.79	1	1
Haiti in Action	69,911	4.45	1	1,964	0.41	0	78,131	4.15	0	1
Struggling People's Organization	59,109	3.77	0	13,346	2.76	0	59,580	3.17	1	1
Renmen Ayiti	48,157	3.07	0	11,228	2.32	0				0
Pont	46,775	2.98	0	2,441	0.50	0	47,754	2.54	1	1
Inite Patriyotik	42,607	2.71	0	25,324	5.23	0	28,368	1.51	1	1
Fusion of Haitian Social Democrats	41,855	2.67	0	14,624	3.02	0				0
Alternative League for Haitian Progress and Emancipation	37,027	2.36	0	24,907	5.15	0	23,754	1.26	0	0
Kombit Travaye Peyizan pou Libere Ayiti	33,861	2.16	0	16,962	3.50	0	19,940	1.06	0	0
Consortium National des Partis Politiques Haïtiens	28,976	1.85	0	29,129	6.02	0	33,943	1.80	1	1
Ansanm Patriyot pou Lavni Ayiti	24,194	1.54	0				11,287	0.60	0	0
Christian Movement for a New Haiti	21,006	1.34	0	3,609	0.75	0				0
Mouvement Patriotique de l'Opposition Démocratique	15,814	1.01	0							0
Respect	12,739	0.81	0	2,327	0.48	0				0
Pati Politik Fanm ak Fanmi	9,884	0.63	0	755	0.16	0	12,068	0.64	0	0
Veye Yo	9,392	0.60	0							0
Platfòm Peyizan	9,349	0.60	0							0
Force Unite Nationale	8,300	0.53	0							0
CANAAN	6,881	0.44	0							0
Rapwoche	6,631	0.42	0							0
Aksyon pou Konstwi yon Ayiti Oganize	6,339	0.40	0	6,097	1.26	0				0
Socialist Action Movement	6,316	0.40	0	2,161	0.45	0				0
Entente Nationale des Travailleurs pour le Reveil d'Haïti	6,172	0.39	0	512	0.11	0				0
Tet Kole sous Chimen Devlopman pou un Nord'Ouest Uni et Renonve	4,894	0.31	0							0
Mouvement National Haïtien	4,342	0.28	0							0
Rassemblement des Nationaux Démocrates Volontaires pour l'Unité Salvatrice	4,123	0.26	0							0
Union des Patriotes pour l'Avancement National	4,021	0.26	0							0
Konsyans Patriyotik	3,848	0.25	0							0
PPG18	3,260	0.21	0	1,115	0.23	0				0
Mouvement Progressiste pour l'Avancement des Masses	2,906	0.19	0	472	0.10	0				0
Nouvelle Haïti	2,464	0.16	0							0
Mouvement Revolisyone Ayisyen	2,364	0.15	0	2,353	0.49	0				0
Platforme Ayisyen Kap Travay pou Rekonstwi Ayiti Infyel ak Liberel	2,343	0.15	0							0
ATERI	2,069	0.13	0							0
Action Démocratie pour Bâtir Haïti	1,819	0.12	0							0
Platfòm Leve Kanpe	1,605	0.10	0							0
Retabli Ayiti	1,511	0.10	0							0
Alliance Démocratique pour la Reconciliation Nationale	1,479	0.09	0							0
Union Nationale des Démocrates Haïtiens	1,265	0.08	0							0
Front Uni pour la Renaissance d'Haïti	1,206	0.08	0	1,343	0.28	0				0
Konbit Sitwayen	1,129	0.07	0							0
Parti pour l'Evolution Nationale Haïtienne	1,119	0.07	0							0
Mouvement d'Union Republicaine	1,044	0.07	0							0
Front Civico-Politique Haïtien	974	0.06	0							0
Mouvement Independent Kitirel Social Economie ak Politik an Ayiti	930	0.06	0							0
UNIR-AYITI INI	853	0.05	0	562	0.12	0				0
Force Démocratique Haïtien Intégré	844	0.05	0	1,246	0.26	0				0
Kombit Liberasyon Ekonomik	621	0.04	0	689	0.14	0				0
Cohesion Nationale des Partis Politiques Haïtiens	541	0.03	0	558	0.12	0				0
Reconstruire Haïti	503	0.03	0	520	0.11	0				0
United Haitian Socialist Party	484	0.03	0	483	0.10	0				0
Solution	471	0.03	0							0
Plan d'Action Citoyenne	381	0.02	0	489	0.10	0				0
Haitian Republican Party	366	0.02	0	395	0.08	0				0
None of the above	14,288	0.91	–	3,648	0.75	–	28,760	1.53	–	–
Total	1,569,707	100.00	2	484,096	100.00	0	1,882,384	100.00	18	20
Valid votes	1,569,707	95.49		484,096	95.77		1,882,384	99.22		
Invalid/blank votes	74,140	4.51		21,363	4.23		14,837	0.78		
Total votes	1,643,847	100.00		505,459	100.00		1,897,221	100.00		

==== By department ====
Artibonite
Candidate	Party	First round 9 August 2015		Second round 25 October 2015	
Candidate	Party	Votes	%	Votes	%
Youri Laturtue	Haiti in Action	47,005	26.90		
Carl Murat Cantave	Konvansyon Inite Demokratik	18,201	10.41	96,383	53.39
Jean Baptiste Jean Willy	Haiti in Action	18,009	10.30	78,131	43.28
Levaillant Louis-Jeune	Inite Patriyotik	11,701	6.70		
Delice Jean-Claude	Vérité	10,336	5.91		
Chrysostome Michel	Alternative League for Haitian Progress and Emancipation	10,102	5.78		
Dieudonne Sadrac	Christian Movement for a New Haiti	7,879	4.51		
Israel Patrice	Fanmi Lavalas	7,463	4.27		
Saint Remy Marie Daniel Charles Edouard	Haitian Tèt Kale Party	4,888	2.80		
Bien-Aime Gerda	Reseau National Bouclier	4,539	2.60		
Guillaume Edva	Struggling People's Organization	4,208	2.41		
Benoit Revenel	Mouvement Patriotique de l'Opposition Démocratique	3,897	2.23		
Joseph Jean Verner	Kombit Travaye Peyizan pou Libere Ayiti	3,155	1.81		
Duvignaud Claire Francois	Renmen Ayiti	3,043	1.74		
Louissaint Jose Benoit	Platfòm Pitit Desalin	2,968	1.70		
Philogene Michelle	Union des Patriotes pour l'Avancement National	2,824	1.62		
Jean Baptiste Fritzner	Renmen Ayiti	2,039	1.17		
Emilcar Olvy	Platfòm Pitit Desalin	2,027	1.16		
Anmuel Thelot	Rapwoche	1,940	1.11		
Normil Pierre-Max	Fusion of Haitian Social Democrats	1,814	1.04		
Limage Roseline	Retabli Ayiti	1,511	0.86		
Paul Pollyx	Nouvelle Haïti	1,393	0.80		
Dort Jean-Robert	Mouvement Independent Kitirel Social Economie ak Politik an Ayiti	930	0.53		
Thomas Eddy Dupiton	Consortium National des Partis Politiques Haïtiens	925	0.53		
Mimy Leonce	Ansanm Patriyot pou Lavni Ayiti	680	0.39		
None of the above		1,293	0.74	6,027	3.34
Total		174,770	100.00	180,541	100.00
Valid votes		174,770	96.52	180,541	91.83
Invalid/blank votes		6,307	3.48	16,059	8.17
Total votes		181,077	100.00	196,600	100.00

Centre
Candidate	Party	First round 9 August 2015		First round rerun 25 October 2015		Second round 20 November 2016	
Candidate	Party	Votes	%	Votes	%	Votes	%
Joseph Willot	Haitian Tèt Kale Party	40,303	28.18	43,491	27.78	50,626	38.68
Wilfrid Gélin	Haitian Tèt Kale Party	22,016	15.40	24,647	15.75	31,115	23.77
Jiha Jean Junior	Reseau National Bouclier	19,008	13.29	19,974	12.76	24,783	18.94
Chevry Gregory	Alternative League for Haitian Progress and Emancipation	11,447	8.00	14,179	9.06	23,754	18.15
St Naré Philefrant	Kombit Travaye Peyizan pou Libere Ayiti	6,655	4.65	6,967	4.45		
Telemarque Ecclesiaste	Vérité	6,531	4.57	6,512	4.16		
Louis Joseph Joël	Kombit Travaye Peyizan pou Libere Ayiti	5,322	3.72	8,126	5.19		
Fetiere Myriam	Fusion of Haitian Social Democrats	4,933	3.45	4,966	3.17		
Marcadieu Eddy John	Platfòm Pitit Desalin	3,767	2.63	3,881	2.48		
Joseph Levy	Renmen Ayiti	3,291	2.30	3,356	2.14		
Marcelin Frantzy	Fanmi Lavalas	3,175	2.22	3,103	1.98		
Supplice Etzer Joseph	Fusion of Haitian Social Democrats	2,626	1.84	2,684	1.71		
Francois Bazelais	Fanmi Lavalas	2,488	1.74	2,431	1.55		
Richard Clodanor Jacob	Struggling People's Organization	2,474	1.73	2,766	1.77		
Gerome Jonas	Konvansyon Inite Demokratik	1,702	1.19	1,797	1.15		
Theisme Prospere	Platfòm Pitit Desalin	1,523	1.06	1,637	1.05		
Ambroise Edouard	Consortium National des Partis Politiques Haïtiens	1,154	0.81	1,158	0.74		
Pierre Yvon	PPG18	1,109	0.78	1,115	0.71		
Destinoble Anrino	Consortium National des Partis Politiques Haïtiens	668	0.47	689	0.44		
Joseph Fabert	Cohesion Nationale des Partis Politiques Haïtiens	541	0.38	558	0.36		
Metellus Smith	Front Uni pour la Renaissance d'Haïti	469	0.33	614	0.39		
Souverain Cleonor	Mouvement Progressiste pour l'Avancement des Masses	454	0.32	472	0.30		
Joseph Martial Prudent	Haitian Republican Party	366	0.26	395	0.25		
None of the above		984	0.69	1,018	0.65	599	0.46
Total		143,006	100.00	156,536	100.00	130,877	100.00
Valid votes		143,006	94.66	156,536	94.76	130,877	95.77
Invalid/blank votes		8,073	5.34	8,658	5.24	5,787	4.23
Total votes		151,079	100.00	165,194	100.00	136,664	100.00

Grand'Anse
Candidate	Party	First round 9 August 2015		First round rerun 25 October 2015		Second round 20 November 2016	
Candidate	Party	Votes	%	Votes	%	Votes	%
Guy Philippe	Consortium National des Partis Politiques Haïtiens	17,453	20.03	24,648	22.49	33,943	35.46
Sorel Jacinthe	Inite Patriyotik	17,434	20.01	23,890	21.80	28,368	29.64
Clerie Michel	Haitian Tèt Kale Party	16,612	19.07	21,076	19.23	20,183	21.09
Roumer Jean Maxime	Reseau National Bouclier	6,803	7.81	9,654	8.81	12,834	13.41
Antoine Carl	Struggling People's Organization	6,550	7.52	8,173	7.46		
Frederick Jean Lavaud	Alternative League for Haitian Progress and Emancipation	5,942	6.82	6,479	5.91		
Barthelemy Guibert	Renmen Ayiti	2,318	2.66	2,669	2.44		
Robert Jean Fleurant	Kombit Travaye Peyizan pou Libere Ayiti	2,285	2.62	1,869	1.71		
Jerome Michelet	Konvansyon Inite Demokratik	1,914	2.20	1,936	1.77		
Candy Wilquens	Fanmi Lavalas	1,792	2.06	1,823	1.66		
St Natus Clotaire Jean	Fanmi Lavalas	1,784	2.05	1,471	1.34		
Raphael Lagrenade Rose Eumeline	Platfòm Pitit Desalin	1,769	2.03	1,993	1.82		
Azor Jean Ronald	Respect	1,477	1.70	1,424	1.30		
Calas Jean Roudy	Fusion of Haitian Social Democrats	1,102	1.27	926	0.84		
Louigene Mesmin	UNIR-AYITI INI	853	0.98	562	0.51		
Caidor Louis Nestra	Pati Politik Fanm ak Fanmi	472	0.54	392	0.36		
None of the above		554	0.64	615	0.56	388	0.41
Total		87,114	100.00	109,600	100.00	95,716	100.00
Valid votes		87,114	95.83	109,600	96.06	95,716	96.75
Invalid/blank votes		3,794	4.17	4,491	3.94	3,218	3.25
Total votes		90,908	100.00	114,091	100.00	98,934	100.00

Nippes
Candidate	Party	First round 9 August 2015		Second round 25 October 2015	
Candidate	Party	Votes	%	Votes	%
Dumelfort Marie Carme Sineas	Vérité	19,697	20.48	22,856	22.14
Nenel Cassy	Fanmi Lavalas	17,289	17.98	30,953	29.98
Denius Francenet	Vérité	15,168	15.77	28,801	27.89
Jeanty Jean William	Kombit Travaye Peyizan pou Libere Ayiti	11,268	11.72	19,940	19.31
Arice Dieusseul	Renmen Ayiti	8,029	8.35		
Casimir Michelet	Platfòm Pitit Desalin	7,888	8.20		
Edouard Liez	Konvansyon Inite Demokratik	3,408	3.54		
Saintil Ricardo	Socialist Action Movement	2,570	2.67		
Joseph Meclis	Struggling People's Organization	2,525	2.63		
Turenne Leonard Sertulien	Rapwoche	1,832	1.90		
Anglade Jacob	Alternative League for Haitian Progress and Emancipation	1,759	1.83		
Francois Evince	Parti pour l'Evolution Nationale Haïtienne	1,119	1.16		
Arcelin Pierre-Richard	Mouvement d'Union Republicaine	1,044	1.09		
Jacques Lassegue	Mouvement National Haïtien	847	0.88		
Florestal Paulin	Socialist Action Movement	795	0.83		
None of the above		945	0.98	699	0.68
Total		96,183	100.00	103,249	100.00
Valid votes		96,183	94.09	103,249	95.06
Invalid/blank votes		6,040	5.91	5,363	4.94
Total votes		102,223	100.00	108,612	100.00

Nord
Candidate	Party	First round 9 August 2015		First round rerun 25 October 2015		Second round 20 November 2016	
Candidate	Party	Votes	%	Votes	%	Votes	%
Nawoon Marcellus	Reseau National Bouclier	32,812	20.00	49,560	22.74	80,942	31.21
Dieudonné Luma Étienne	Haitian Tèt Kale Party	24,905	15.18	38,447	17.64	90,617	34.94
Bastien Kely C.	Vérité	15,668	9.55	24,306	11.15	52,976	20.42
Metelus Justin	Reseau National Bouclier	13,139	8.01	18,237	8.37	33,932	13.08
Saintilus Theodore	Platfòm Pitit Desalin	9,516	5.80	13,891	6.37		
Pierre Pelotat	Platfòm Pitit Desalin	8,707	5.31	9,882	4.53		
Docteur Sergilus	Aksyon pou Konstwi yon Ayiti Oganize	6,339	3.86	6,097	2.80		
Mompremier Marie Giselhaine	Fusion of Haitian Social Democrats	5,971	3.64	6,048	2.77		
Cadet Esdras	Vérité	5,832	3.55	7,455	3.42		
Charlot Bertrand	Christian Movement for a New Haiti	4,060	2.47	3,609	1.66		
Bell Youseline Augustin	Fanmi Lavalas	3,617	2.20	3,520	1.61		
Gilles Cemephise	Alternative League for Haitian Progress and Emancipation	3,486	2.12	4,249	1.95		
Jeanty John Jerome	Renmen Ayiti	3,415	2.08	5,203	2.39		
Jasmin Jean Jodelle	Pont	2,525	1.54	2,441	1.12		
Desir Arold	Socialist Action Movement	2,445	1.49	2,161	0.99		
Charles Fritzner	Struggling People's Organization	2,412	1.47	2,407	1.10		
Etienne Jean Dorvil Robert	Haiti in Action	2,044	1.25	1,964	0.90		
Magloire Archle	Fanmi Lavalas	1,817	1.11	1,661	0.76		
Laguerre Jean Rene Jacques	Consortium National des Partis Politiques Haïtiens	1,648	1.00	1,730	0.79		
Delva Donel	Inite Patriyotik	1,531	0.93	1,434	0.66		
Julsaint Alain Josette	Konvansyon Inite Demokratik	1,413	0.86	1,529	0.70		
Benjamin Judith	Mouvement Revolisyone Ayisyen	1,240	0.76	1,247	0.57		
Polycarpe Hebert	Mouvement Revolisyone Ayisyen	1,124	0.69	1,106	0.51		
Etienne Antonio	Consortium National des Partis Politiques Haïtiens	961	0.59	904	0.41		
Fleuridor Louis Pierre	Konvansyon Inite Demokratik	863	0.53	923	0.42		
Jean Wilfrid	Force Démocratique Haïtien Intégré	844	0.51	1,246	0.57		
Felix Tiresias Ilrick	Respect	827	0.50	903	0.41		
Calixte Wesly	Front Uni pour la Renaissance d'Haïti	737	0.45	729	0.33		
Joseph Marc Andre	Kombit Liberasyon Ekonomik	621	0.38	689	0.32		
Desir Jean Renaud	Entente Nationale des Travailleurs pour le Reveil d'Haïti	548	0.33	512	0.23		
Charles Geraud	Reconstruire Haïti	503	0.31	520	0.24		
Catel Jean Audan	United Haitian Socialist Party	484	0.30	483	0.22		
Pluviose Christian Leonel	Plan d'Action Citoyenne	381	0.23	489	0.22		
Surpris Edgar Reginald	Pati Politik Fanm ak Fanmi	346	0.21	363	0.17		
None of the above		1,282	0.78	2,015	0.92	918	0.35
Total		164,063	100.00	217,960	100.00	259,385	100.00
Valid votes		164,063	96.16	217,960	96.37	259,385	97.80
Invalid/blank votes		6,553	3.84	8,214	3.63	5,832	2.20
Total votes		170,616	100.00	226,174	100.00	265,217	100.00

Nord Est
Candidate	Party	First round 9 August 2015		Second round 25 October 2015	
Candidate	Party	Votes	%	Votes	%
Ronald Larèche	Vérité	30,490	28.08	52,020	39.42
Jean Jacques Sauveur	Haitian Tèt Kale Party	19,040	17.53	40,947	31.03
Martial Chena Pierre	Fanmi Lavalas	12,604	11.61	27,059	20.50
Etienne Renan	Ansanm Patriyot pou Lavni Ayiti	6,826	6.29	11,287	8.55
Joseph Renord	Vérité	6,449	5.94		
Colas Bilgot	Struggling People's Organization	5,788	5.33		
Fleuridor Jonas	Struggling People's Organization	4,836	4.45		
Laveaux Herns	Konsyans Patriyotik	3,848	3.54		
St Jacques Bind	Kombit Travaye Peyizan pou Libere Ayiti	3,482	3.21		
Leandre Eliacint Mona	Mouvement Patriotique de l'Opposition Démocratique	3,143	2.89		
Tinord Emmanuel	Konvansyon Inite Demokratik	2,666	2.46		
Desir Alix	Konvansyon Inite Demokratik	2,529	2.33		
Voltaire Jean Claude	Inite Patriyotik	2,001	1.84		
Georges Paul Yvon	Renmen Ayiti	1,736	1.60		
Philidor Jasmin	Respect	1,042	0.96		
Dieudonne Louicin	Respect	914	0.84		
None of the above		1,190	1.10	655	0.50
Total		108,584	100.00	131,968	100.00
Valid votes		108,584	95.33	131,968	98.00
Invalid/blank votes		5,320	4.67	2,690	2.00
Total votes		113,904	100.00	134,658	100.00

Nord Ouest
Candidate	Party	First round 9 August 2015		Second round 25 October 2015	
Candidate	Party	Votes	%	Votes	%
Evallière Beauplan	Pont	25,774	22.13	47,754	36.53
Louis Onondieu	Konvansyon Inite Demokratik	21,535	18.49	49,273	37.69
Dieujuste Johnson	Platfòm Pitit Desalin	7,030	6.04	20,861	15.96
Sanon Jean-Gary	Pati Politik Fanm ak Fanmi	5,638	4.84	12,068	9.23
Hyppolite Melius	Struggling People's Organization	5,403	4.64		
Plancher Elie Nicolas	Struggling People's Organization	5,300	4.55		
Augustin Kedlaire	Reseau National Bouclier	5,278	4.53		
Martial Yves	Tet Kole sous Chimen Devlopman pou un Nord'Ouest Uni et Renonve	4,894	4.20		
Desamours Henry	Haitian Tèt Kale Party	4,685	4.02		
Beauge Laurent	Alternative League for Haitian Progress and Emancipation	4,291	3.68		
Fertil Marie Annaise	Fusion of Haitian Social Democrats	3,099	2.66		
Nelson Michelson	Vérité	2,958	2.54		
Frederic Denex	Haiti in Action	2,853	2.45		
Fleurinor Luc	Vérité	2,835	2.43		
Philor Dominique	Fanmi Lavalas	2,168	1.86		
Francois Sylvio	Renmen Ayiti	1,983	1.70		
Telfort Alexandre Fils	Inite Patriyotik	1,637	1.41		
Desravine Devidson	Inite Patriyotik	1,388	1.19		
Stephen Fresnel	Rassemblement des Nationaux Démocrates Volontaires pour l'Unité Salvatrice	1,363	1.17		
Etienne Thomas	Union Nationale des Démocrates Haïtiens	1,265	1.09		
Pierre Wilson	Mouvement National Haïtien	1,244	1.07		
Joseph Jostem	Platfòm Peyizan	977	0.84		
Choute Althiery	Renmen Ayiti	666	0.57		
Marcelus Wisler	Solution	471	0.40		
Civil Eden Rivelino Placide	Alliance Démocratique pour la Reconciliation Nationale	464	0.40		
None of the above		1,254	1.08	759	0.58
Total		116,453	100.00	130,715	100.00
Valid votes		116,453	96.74	130,715	97.55
Invalid/blank votes		3,927	3.26	3,287	2.45
Total votes		120,380	100.00	134,002	100.00

Ouest
Candidate	Party	First round 9 August 2015		Second round 25 October 2015	
Candidate	Party	Votes	%	Votes	%
Jean Renel Sénatus	Ligue Dessalinienne	101,884	27.63		
Antonio Chéramy	Vérité	57,881	15.70	297,260	64.40
Alix Didier Fils-Aime	Vérité	24,057	6.52	147,548	31.97
Muraille Jean Myrtho	Platfòm Pitit Desalin	21,605	5.86		
Jean Tholbert Alèxis	Pont	18,476	5.01		
Gilles Louis Gerald	Fanmi Lavalas	15,086	4.09		
Belizaire Arnel	Ansanm Patriyot pou Lavni Ayiti	14,561	3.95		
Auguste Annette	Haitian Tèt Kale Party	14,359	3.89		
Louidor Schiller	Fanmi Lavalas	10,213	2.77		
Théus Beguens	Christian Movement for a New Haiti	9,067	2.46		
Marie Liliane Vedrigue-Hersche	Force Unite Nationale	8,300	2.25		
Delpe Turneb	Mouvement Patriotique de l'Opposition Démocratique	6,156	1.67		
Saincy Dieudonne	Platfòm Pitit Desalin	5,783	1.57		
Claude Marie Denise	Inite Patriyotik	4,523	1.23		
Jean Mona	Fusion of Haitian Social Democrats	4,522	1.23		
Civil Rene	Renmen Ayiti	4,308	1.17		
Morpeau Sabine Duvivier	CANAAN	4,224	1.15		
Casimir Gary	Entente Nationale des Travailleurs pour le Reveil d'Haïti	4,165	1.13		
Alfred Micanord	Renmen Ayiti	3,210	0.87		
Jean-Louis Ernso	CANAAN	2,657	0.72		
John Joseph Joel	Mouvement Progressiste pour l'Avancement des Masses	2,452	0.67		
Mathieu Tranquilor	Inite Patriyotik	2,392	0.65		
Lacroix Jeffers Pierre De Dieu-Seul	Platforme Ayisyen Kap Travay pou Rekonstwi Ayiti Infyel ak Liberel	2,343	0.64		
Magny Smith	ATERI	2,069	0.56		
Brisson Fred	Fusion of Haitian Social Democrats	1,973	0.54		
Remile Casimir	Consortium National des Partis Politiques Haïtiens	1,827	0.50		
Jean Pierre Anna Louise Chantale	Action Démocratie pour Bâtir Haïti	1,819	0.49		
Jean Jowel Erns Errol Dimitri David	Kombit Travaye Peyizan pou Libere Ayiti	1,694	0.46		
Leandre Lonick	Rapwoche	1,641	0.45		
Bellerice Jules Emmanuel	Platfòm Leve Kanpe	1,605	0.44		
Joseph Fritznel	Entente Nationale des Travailleurs pour le Reveil d'Haïti	1,459	0.40		
Brutus Miche-Nerson	Rassemblement des Nationaux Démocrates Volontaires pour l'Unité Salvatrice	1,401	0.38		
Octeus Josue	Union des Patriotes pour l'Avancement National	1,197	0.32		
Etienne Nel-Bien-Aime	Konbit Sitwayen	1,129	0.31		
Louis Jean Gethro	Nouvelle Haïti	1,071	0.29		
Cely Sony	Mouvement National Haïtien	1,009	0.27		
Pierre Maurice	Front Civico-Politique Haïtien	974	0.26		
Mouscardy Guercy	Respect	957	0.26		
Mercredi Lukner	Pati Politik Fanm ak Fanmi	880	0.24		
None of the above		3,785	1.03	16,749	3.63
Total		368,714	100.00	461,557	100.00
Valid votes		368,714	95.79	461,557	90.64
Invalid/blank votes		16,216	4.21	47,666	9.36
Total votes		384,930	100.00	509,223	100.00

Sud
Candidate	Party	First round 9 August 2015		Second round 25 October 2015	
Candidate	Party	Votes	%	Votes	%
Richard Lénine Hervé Fourcand	Haitian Tèt Kale Party	22,822	13.13	57,849	27.51
Jean-Marie Junior Salomon	Struggling People's Organization	19,613	11.28	59,580	28.33
Buissereth Yvon	Vérité	19,124	11.00	47,283	22.48
Exius Pierre Franky	Fanmi Lavalas	15,758	9.07	44,276	21.05
Sildor Pierre François	Reseau National Bouclier	10,981	6.32		
Severe Pierre Flaurus Patrix	Vérité	9,552	5.50		
Mathieu Kenol	Veye Yo	9,392	5.40		
Raphael Louis Paul	Fanmi Lavalas	8,639	4.97		
Vital Wilfrid Leader's	Konvansyon Inite Demokratik	8,425	4.85		
Thanis Jean Fenel	Platfòm Peyizan	8,372	4.82		
Bourjolly Emmanuel Fritz Gerald	Fusion of Haitian Social Democrats	7,472	4.30		
Geneste Jean Davide	Konvansyon Inite Demokratik	6,159	3.54		
Mathelier Jacques	Renmen Ayiti	4,830	2.78		
Laguerre Johny	Consortium National des Partis Politiques Haïtiens	4,340	2.50		
Ariste Michelet	Platfòm Pitit Desalin	3,210	1.85		
Jerome Joseph Edriss	PPG18	2,151	1.24		
Chery Pierre Moise	Platfòm Pitit Desalin	1,806	1.04		
Saint Clore Jean Truchard	Renmen Ayiti	1,626	0.94		
Jean Claude Jean Wilson	Mouvement Patriotique de l'Opposition Démocratique	1,360	0.78		
Lamur Luc	Rassemblement des Nationaux Démocrates Volontaires pour l'Unité Salvatrice	1,359	0.78		
Decembre Edny	Mouvement National Haïtien	1,242	0.71		
Emile Edwin Joseph	Rapwoche	1,218	0.70		
Saint Jacques Jean Westais	Alliance Démocratique pour la Reconciliation Nationale	1,015	0.58		
Joseph Paul Marc- Aime	Pati Politik Fanm ak Fanmi	997	0.57		
Favard Jean Petion	Socialist Action Movement	506	0.29		
None of the above		1,854	1.07	1,314	0.62
Total		173,823	100.00	210,302	100.00
Valid votes		173,823	93.67	210,302	96.14
Invalid/blank votes		11,740	6.33	8,446	3.86
Total votes		185,563	100.00	218,748	100.00

Sud Est
Candidate	Party	First round 9 August 2015		Second round 25 October 2015	
Candidate	Party	Votes	%	Votes	%
Joseph Lambert	Haitian Tèt Kale Party	28,878	21.08	43,111	24.21
Dieupie Chérubin	Konvansyon Inite Demokratik	24,779	18.09	51,251	28.78
Lambert Wencesclass	Haitian Tèt Kale Party	23,196	16.93	32,623	18.32
Pierre Ricard	Platfòm Pitit Desalin	13,630	9.95	50,437	28.32
Charles Marc-Elder	Renmen Ayiti	7,663	5.59		
Lahatte Hébert	Respect	7,522	5.49		
Jameau Miralda	Vérité	7,440	5.43		
Moise Marie Sylvia Fabien	Fanmi Lavalas	6,333	4.62		
Abraham Jacques	Fusion of Haitian Social Democrats	5,355	3.91		
Content Wilnet	Fanmi Lavalas	3,130	2.28		
Felix Jean Chrisostome Joseph	Fusion of Haitian Social Democrats	2,988	2.18		
Pierre Ronald	Ansanm Patriyot pou Lavni Ayiti	2,127	1.55		
Cajou Milot Fenelon	Pati Politik Fanm ak Fanmi	1,551	1.13		
Toussaint Saico Jean Michel Severe	Mouvement Patriotique de l'Opposition Démocratique	1,258	0.92		
None of the above		1,147	0.84	652	0.37
Total		136,997	100.00	178,074	100.00
Valid votes		136,997	95.69	178,074	97.15
Invalid/blank votes		6,170	4.31	5,228	2.85
Total votes		143,167	100.00	183,302	100.00

== See also ==
- November 2016 Haitian presidential election
