= Political parties in Haiti =

This article includes current and historical political parties in Haiti. Haiti is a country on the western side of Hispaniola, an island in the Caribbean. Few political parties have a strong organizational base or command a national following.

== List of parties represented in the National Assembly ==
In 2020 and 2021 all elected members of the National Assembly saw their terms expire since their election in 2015-2016 or 2016-2017. Due to the lack of new elections, this has left all seats in the National Assembly vacant. The following table lists the parties represented in the National Assembly prior to its vacancy:

Name	(in French)	(in Haitian Creole)	Abbr	Chamber of Deputies	Senate	Notes
Alternative	Alternative	Altènatif	Alternative	0 / 119	5 / 30	
Alternative League for Haitian Progress and Emancipation	Ligue Alternative pour le Progrès et L'Émancipation Haïtienne	Lig Altènatif pou Pwogrè ak Emansipasyon Ayisyen	LAPEH	3 / 119	0 / 30	
Lavalas Family	Famille Lavalas	Fanmi Lavalas	FL	6 / 119	1 / 30	
Fusion of Haitian Social Democrats	Fusion des Sociaux-Démocrates Haïtiens	Fizyon Sosyodemokrat Ayiti	FSDH	3 / 119	0 / 30	
Haiti in Action	Haïti en action	Ayiti an aksyon	AAA	6 / 119	1 / 30	
Haitian Tèt Kale Party	Parti haïtien Tèt Kale	Pati Ayisyen Tèt Kale	PHTK	31 / 119	2 / 30	
Democratic Unity Convention	Convention d'unité démocratique	Konvansyon Inite Demokratik	KID	7 / 119	3 / 30	
Patriotic Unity	Unité patriotique	Inite Patriyotik	INITE	4 / 119	5 / 30	(Note: Formerly known as Front of Hope)
Struggling People's Organization	Organization du peuple en lutte	Òganizasyon Pèp K ap Lite	OPL	9 / 119	1 / 30	
Plateforme Vérité	Vérité	Verite	VERITE	13 / 119	3 / 30	
National Shield Network	Réseau du Bouclier national	Reseau National Bouclier	BOUCLIER	3 / 119	0 / 30	
Love Haiti	J'aime Haïti	Renmen Ayiti	RA	2 / 119	0 / 30	
Tet Kole sources the Development Path for a united and renewed North West	Tet Kole source Voie de développement pour un Nord-Ouest uni et renouvelé	Tet Kole sous Chimen Devlopman pou un Nord'Ouest uni et Renonve	MOSANO	2 / 119	0 / 30	
National Consortium of Haitian Political Parties	Consortium National des Partis Politiques Haïtiens	Consortium National des Partis Politiques Haïtiens	CONSORTIUM	2 / 119	0 / 30	
Bridge	Pont	Pon	Pont	1 / 119	1 / 30	
Child of Dessalines Platform	Plate-forme Enfant de Dessalines	Platfòm Pitit Desalin	PPD	1 / 119	1 / 30	
Party for the Liberation of the Masses and Social Integration	Parti pour la Libération des Masses et d'Intégration Sociale	Pati pou liberasyon mas yo ak entegrasyon sosyal	PALMIS	1 / 119	0 / 30	
Peasant Workers Struggle to Free Haiti	Les travailleurs paysans de Kombit pour libérer Haïti	Konbit Travaye Peyizan pou Libere Ayiti	KONTRA PEP LA	1 / 119	0 / 30	
Haitian National Movement	Mouvement National Haïtien	Mouvman Nasyonal Ayisyen	MONHA	1 / 119	0 / 30	
Patriotic Consciousness	Conscience patriotique	Konsyans Patriotik	KP	1 / 119	0 / 30	
Federalist Party	Parti fédéraliste	Pati Federalis	PF	1 / 119	0 / 30	
Socialist Action Movement	Mouvement Action Socialiste	Mouvman Aksyon Sosyalis	MAS	1 / 119	0 / 30	
Dessalinian League	Ligue Dessalinienne	Dessalinian League	LIDE	0 / 119	1 / 30	

== List of parties not represented in the National Assembly ==
Name	(in French)	(in Haitian Creole)	Abbr	Notes
National Unity Party	Parti de l'unité nationale	Pati Inite Nasyonal la	PUN	
The Haitian Brotherhood	La Fraternité Haïtienne	Fratènite ayisyen an	LFH	
Socio-Political Organization of the West	Organisation socio-politique de l'Occident	Òganizasyon sosyo-politik nan Lwès la	OSPO	
Respect	Respè	Respe	Respè	
People's Party for Haiti's Rebirth	Parti Populaire Du Renouveau Haïtien	Pati Pèp Renouvèlman Ayisyen	PPRH	
Political Party for Us All	Parti politique pou nou tout	pati politik pou nou tout	Pont	(Note: see Jean Marie Chérestal)
Peasant Affair with the Haitian People	Affaire paysanne avec le peuple haïtien	Zafè peyizan ak pèp ayisyen an	APPA	
Peasant Response	Réponse Paysanne	Repons Peyizan	RP	
Rally of Progressive National Democrats	Rassemblement des Démocrates Nationaux Progressistes	Rasanbleman Demokrat Nasyonal Pwogresis yo	RDNP	
Rally of the Militant of the Town of Saint-Marc	Rassemblement des Militants Conséquents de la Commune de St. Marc	Rasanbleman Militan Konsekan Komin St Marc	RAMICOS	
Conviction	Conviction	Konviksyon	Konviksyon	
Democratic Liberation Movement of Haiti	Mouvement Démocratique de Libération d'Haïti	Mouvman Liberasyon Demokratik Ayiti	MODELH	
Mobilization for National Development	Mobilisation pour le développement national	Mobilizasyon pou devlopman nasyonal	MDN	
Movement for the Organization of the Country	Mouvement d'Organisation du Pays	Mouvman Òganizasyon Peyi	MOP	
National Cooperative Action Movement	Mouvement national d'action coopérative	Mouvman Aksyon Koperativ Nasyonal	MAKN	
National Front for Change and Democracy	Front national pour le changement et la démocratie	Fwon Nasyonal pou Chanjman ak Demokrasi	FNCD	
National Reconstruction Front	Front pour la reconstruction nationale	Fwon pou Rekonstriksyon Nasyonal	FRN	
New Haitian Communist Party (Marxist–Leninist)	Nouveau Parti Communiste Haïtien (Marxiste–Léniniste)	Nouvo Pati Kominis Ayisyen (Maksis-Leninis)	NPCH(ML)	
Open the Gate Party	Parti Louvri Barye	Louvri Barye Party	PLB	
Organization of Revolutionary Workers	Organisation des travailleurs révolutionnaires	Òganizasyon Travayè Revolisyonè yo	OTR-UCI	(Note: Affiliated with the Internationalist Communist Union)
Organization for the Advancement of Haiti and Haitians	Organisation Pour L'Avancement D'Haïti Et Des Haïtiens	Òganizasyon pou Avansman Ayiti ak Ayisyen	OLAHH	
Haitian Democratic Party	Parti Démocrate Haïtien	Pati Demokrat Ayisyen	PADEMH	
Independent Movement for National Reconciliation	Mouvement indépendant pour la réconciliation nationale	Mouvman Endepandan pou Rekonsilyasyon Nasyonal	MIRN	
Haitian Christian Democratic Party	Parti chrétien-démocrate haïtien	Pati Kretyen Demokratik Ayisyen	PKDA	
Haitian Democratic Party	Parti Démocratique Haïtien	Pati Demokrat Ayisyen	PDA	
Haitian Liberal and Social Party	Parti libéral et social haïtien	Pati Liberal ak Sosyal Ayisyen	PLSA	(Note: later merged into People's Party for Haiti's Rebirth)
Bourad to put Haiti back on its feet	Bourad pour remettre Haïti debout	Bourad pou remete Ayiti debou	Bourad	
Christian Movement for a New Haiti	Mouvement Chrétien pour une Nouvelle Haïti	Mouvman Kretyen pou yon Nouvo Ayiti	Mochrenha	
Christian National Union for the Reconstruction of Haiti	Mouvement Chrétien pour Bâtir une Nouvelle Haïti	Mouvman Kretyen Pou Konstwi Yon Nouvo Ayiti	MKKNA	
Cooperative Action to Build Haiti	Action coopérative pour construire Haïti	Aksyon koperativ pou konstwi Ayiti	KONBA	
Democratic Alliance Party	Alliance démocratique	Alyans	Alyans	
Democratic Consultation Group coalition	Coalition du Groupe de consultation démocratique	Kowalisyon Gwoup Konsiltasyon Demokratik	KGKD	
Alliance for the Liberation and Advancement of Haiti	Alliance pour la libération et l'avancement d'Haïti	Alyans pou Liberasyon ak Avansman Ayiti	ALAA	
Party for the Integral Advancement of the Haitian People	Parti Pour l'Avancement Intégral du Peuple Haïtien	Pati pou Avansman Entegral Pèp Ayisyen	PAIPH	

== Hypothetical polling ==
View source data.
View source data.

== Defunct parties ==
- Liberal Party (1870s) – Former Liberal Party
- National Party (1870s) – Former Nationalist Party
- Haitian Communist Party (1934–1936) – Banned Communist
- Haitian Socialist Party (1946) – Communist
- Popular Socialist Party (1946–1948) – Banned Communist
- Unified Party of Haitian Communists (1968–1969) – Banned Communist
- Front for Hope (Fwon Lespwa) (1995–2009) Left-wing nationalism, Democratic socialism

== See also ==
- Politics of Haiti
- Lists of political parties

== Notes and references ==
Notes
