= List of prime ministers of Haiti =

This article lists the prime ministers of Haiti since the establishment of the office of Prime Minister of Haiti in 1988.

== List of officeholders ==
Political parties

Rally of Progressive National Democrats
Struggling People's Organization
Movement for the Instauration of Democracy in Haiti
Fanmi Lavalas
Lespwa
Repons Peyizan
Democratic Alliance Party
Inite
Democratic Movement of Haiti – Democratic Rally of Haiti
Renmen Ayiti
Haitian Tèt Kale Party

Other factions

Independent

Symbols

Acting prime minister

No.	Portrait	Name (Birth–Death)	Election	Term of office			Political party	President (Term)
No.	Portrait	Name (Birth–Death)	Election	Took office	Left office	Time in office	Political party	President (Term)
1		Martial Célestin (1913–2011)	1988	9 February 1988	20 June 1988 (Deposed)	132 days	Independent	Leslie Manigat (1988)
Post vacant (20 June 1988 – 13 February 1991)
2		René Préval (1943–2017)	1990–91	13 February 1991	11 October 1991 (Deposed)	240 days	Struggling People's Organization	Jean-Bertrand Aristide (1991)
3		Jean-Jacques Honorat (1931–2023)	—	11 October 1991	19 June 1992	252 days	Independent	Joseph Nérette (1991–1992)
4		Marc Bazin (1932–2010)	—	19 June 1992	30 August 1993	1 year, 72 days	Movement for the Instauration of Democracy in Haiti	Marc Bazin (1992–1993)
5		Robert Malval (born 1943)	1993	30 August 1993	8 November 1994	1 year, 70 days	Independent	Émile Jonassaint (1993–1994)
6		Smarck Michel (1937–2012)	—	8 November 1994	7 November 1995	364 days	Struggling People's Organization	Jean-Bertrand Aristide (1994–1996)
7		Claudette Werleigh (born 1946)	1995	7 November 1995	27 February 1996	112 days	Struggling People's Organization	Jean-Bertrand Aristide (1994–1996)
8		Rosny Smarth (1940–2025)	—	27 February 1996	20 October 1997	1 year, 235 days	Struggling People's Organization	René Préval (1996–2001)
Post vacant (20 October 1997 – 26 March 1999)								René Préval (1996–2001)
9		Jacques-Édouard Alexis (born 1947)	—	26 March 1999	2 March 2001	1 year, 341 days	Fanmi Lavalas	René Préval (1996–2001)
10		Jean Marie Chérestal (born 1947)	2000	2 March 2001	15 March 2002	1 year, 13 days	Fanmi Lavalas	Jean-Bertrand Aristide (2001–2004)
11		Yvon Neptune (born 1946)	—	15 March 2002	12 March 2004 (Deposed)	1 year, 363 days	Fanmi Lavalas	Jean-Bertrand Aristide (2001–2004)
12		Gérard Latortue (1934–2023)	—	12 March 2004	9 June 2006	2 years, 89 days	Independent	Boniface Alexandre (2004–2006)
(9)		Jacques-Édouard Alexis (born 1947)	2006	9 June 2006	5 September 2008	2 years, 88 days	Lespwa	René Préval (2006–2011)
13		Michèle Pierre-Louis (born 1947)	—	5 September 2008	11 November 2009	1 year, 67 days	Independent	René Préval (2006–2011)
14		Jean-Max Bellerive (born 1958)	—	11 November 2009	18 October 2011	1 year, 341 days	Lespwa	René Préval (2006–2011)
15		Garry Conille (born 1966)	2010–11	18 October 2011	16 May 2012	211 days	Independent	Michel Martelly (2011–2016)
16		Laurent Lamothe (born 1972)	—	16 May 2012	20 December 2014	2 years, 218 days	Independent	Michel Martelly (2011–2016)
—		Florence Duperval Guillaume	—	20 December 2014	16 January 2015	27 days	Independent	Michel Martelly (2011–2016)
17		Evans Paul (born 1955)	—	16 January 2015	26 February 2016	1 year, 41 days	Democratic Alliance Party	Michel Martelly (2011–2016)
18		Fritz Jean (born 1956)	2015–16	26 February 2016	28 March 2016	31 days	Inite	Jocelerme Privert (2016–2017)
19		Enex Jean-Charles (born 1960)	—	28 March 2016	21 March 2017	358 days	Independent	Jocelerme Privert (2016–2017)
20		Jack Guy Lafontant (born 1961)	—	21 March 2017	17 September 2018	1 year, 180 days	Democratic Movement of Haiti – Democratic Rally of Haiti	Jovenel Moïse (2017–2021)
21		Jean-Henry Céant (born 1956)	—	17 September 2018	21 March 2019	185 days	Renmen Ayiti	Jovenel Moïse (2017–2021)
—		Jean-Michel Lapin (born 1967)	—	21 March 2019	4 March 2020	349 days	Independent	Jovenel Moïse (2017–2021)
22		Joseph Jouthe (born 1961)	—	4 March 2020	13 April 2021	1 year, 40 days	Independent	Jovenel Moïse (2017–2021)
—		Claude Joseph	—	14 April 2021	20 July 2021 (Note: Joseph served under Moïse until his assassination on 7 July 2021.)	97 days	Independent	Jovenel Moïse (2017–2021)
—		Ariel Henry (born 1949)	—	20 July 2021	24 April 2024	2 years, 279 days	Independent	Position vacant (2021–2024)
—		Michel Patrick Boisvert	—	25 February 2024	3 June 2024	99 days (Note: Boisvert discharged the duties of the acting Prime Minister in Ariel Henry's absence after 25 February 2024. Following Henry's resignation on 24 April, he was appointed as the acting Prime Minister by Henry's outgoing cabinet.)	Independent	Position vacant (2021–2024)
—		Garry Conille (born 1966)	—	3 June 2024	10 November 2024	160 days	Independent	Transitional Presidential Council (2024–2026)
—		Alix Didier Fils-Aimé (born 1971)	—	10 November 2024 (Note: Flis-Aimé served under the Transitional Presidential Council until its mandate ended on 7 February 2026.)	Incumbent	1 year, 340 days	Independent	Transitional Presidential Council (2024–2026)

== See also ==
- History of Haiti
- Saint-Domingue
  - List of colonial governors of Saint-Domingue
- Politics of Haiti
- President of Haiti
  - List of heads of state of Haiti
- Prime Minister of Haiti
