= 2009 Haitian Senate election =

- 19 April 2009 (first round); 21 June 2009 (second round)

Elections for a third of the seats in the Senate of Haiti were held on 19 April 2009 (they were scheduled for March or April 2008, but were postponed), with a run-off to be held on 21 June 2009. Per the Constitution of Haiti, voters should renew ten of the thirty seats in the Senate, but as Pierre Emmanuel Limage (representing Fwon Lespwa, the party of President René Préval, for Artibonite), died in a car accident and Ultimo Compère (representing Fwon Lespwa for Centre; his term would have expired in 2008 regularly) and Rudolph H. Boulos (representing the Fusion of Haitian Social Democrats for Nord-Est) resigned, there were twelve open seats instead.

== Background ==
The seats for which elections were held were divided among parties as follows prior to the elections:

- Fwon Lespwa – 4 (two of them currently vacant)
- Fusion of Haitian Social Democrats – 2 (one of them currently vacant)
- Struggling People's Organization – 2
- L'Artibonite in Action – 1
- Pont – 1
- Fanmi Lavalas – 1
- Christian National Union for the Reconstruction of Haiti – 1

Preparations were finished in late May 2008.

== Candidates ==
40 candidates were not allowed to contest the election, including Guy Philippe and all 17 from Aristide's Fanmi Lavalas, reportedly due to procedural mistakes and missing signatures or possibly even two lists of candidates submitted in some constituencies. 79 candidates were approved. The disqualification was strongly criticised by local and international organisations alike, with some even claiming that the elections were not really democratic. A majority for president Préval's Fwon Lespwa party could aid him in amending the constitution to increase the president's power and allowing a second consecutive term.

== Results ==
Turnout was very low. Run-off elections were expected for many seats due to the high number of candidates.

Voting for Ultimo Compère's vacant seat in the Centre department had to be rescheduled after voters ransacked polling places and a poll supervisor was shot in Mirebalais. Results took a few days, as they were all tabulated in Port-au-Prince and therefore all ballots had to arrive there before they could be counted. None of the candidates in any of the departments managed to get more than half of the votes in the first round, so the two candidates in each departments were set to face each other in a run-off on 7 June 2009. Turnout for the first round was around 11%. The run-off was on 13 May 2009 announced to have been postponed to 21 June 2009, due to legal problems with election challenges; by that date, no date had been set for the re-run of the election in the Centre department.

According to final results including annulment of illegal votes, the following parties had candidates in the run-off:

- Fwon Lespwa (LESPWA) – 8 candidates
- Struggling People's Organization (OPL) – 5 candidates
- Fusion of Haitian Social Democrats (FUSION) – 3 candidates
- L'Artibonite in Action (AAA) – 2 candidates
- Christian National Union for the Reconstruction of Haiti (UNION) – 1 candidate
- independent – 1 candidate
- Working Together for Haiti (KONBA) – 1 candidate
- Union of Haitian Citizens for Democracy, Development and Education (UCADDE) – 1 candidate

In the second round, LESPWA won five seats, and five parties won one seat each (OPL, AAA, FUSION, KONBA, UCADDE), as well as an independent.

| Party | First round | | | Second round | | | Total seats |
| Party | Votes | % | Seats | Votes | % | Seats | Total seats |
|---|---|---|---|---|---|---|---|
| Lespwa | 131,647 | 29.68 | 0 | 178,482 | 43.22 | 5 | 5 |
| Struggling People's Organization | 90,549 | 20.41 | 0 | 85,834 | 20.79 | 1 | 1 |
| Fusion of Haitian Social Democrats | 34,191 | 7.71 | 0 | 41,621 | 10.08 | 1 | 1 |
| L'Artibonite in Action | 44,896 | 10.12 | 0 | 37,188 | 9.01 | 1 | 1 |
| Union of Haitian Citizens for Democracy, Development and Education | 14,806 | 3.34 | 1 | 16,943 | 4.10 | 1 | 1 |
| Working Together for Haiti | 18,751 | 4.23 | 0 | 15,909 | 3.85 | 1 | 1 |
| Christian National Union for the Reconstruction of Haiti | 30,205 | 6.81 | 0 | 14,499 | 3.51 | 0 | 0 |
| Respect | 12,976 | 2.93 | 0 | | | 0 | 0 |
| MODELH–PRDH | 11,024 | 2.49 | 0 | | | 0 | 0 |
| Independent Movement for National Reconciliation | 7,794 | 1.76 | 0 | | | 0 | 0 |
| Rally of Progressive National Democrats | 7,382 | 1.66 | 0 | | | 0 | 0 |
| National Unity Party | 4,481 | 1.01 | 0 | | | 0 | 0 |
| Social Renewal Party | 2,461 | 0.55 | 0 | | | 0 | 0 |
| Movement for the Installation of Democracy in Haïti | 1,931 | 0.44 | 0 | | | 0 | 0 |
| Popular Agreement Party | 937 | 0.21 | 0 | | | 0 | 0 |
| Pont | 160 | 0.04 | 0 | | | 0 | 0 |
| Independents | 23,254 | 5.24 | 0 | 16,643 | 4.03 | 1 | 1 |
| Against all | 6,171 | 1.39 | – | 5,841 | 1.41 | – | – |
| Vacant | | | | | | | 1 |
| Total | 443,616 | 100.00 | 1 | 412,960 | 100.00 | 11 | 12 |
Source: CEP, CEP
