= 2004 Haitian coup d'état =

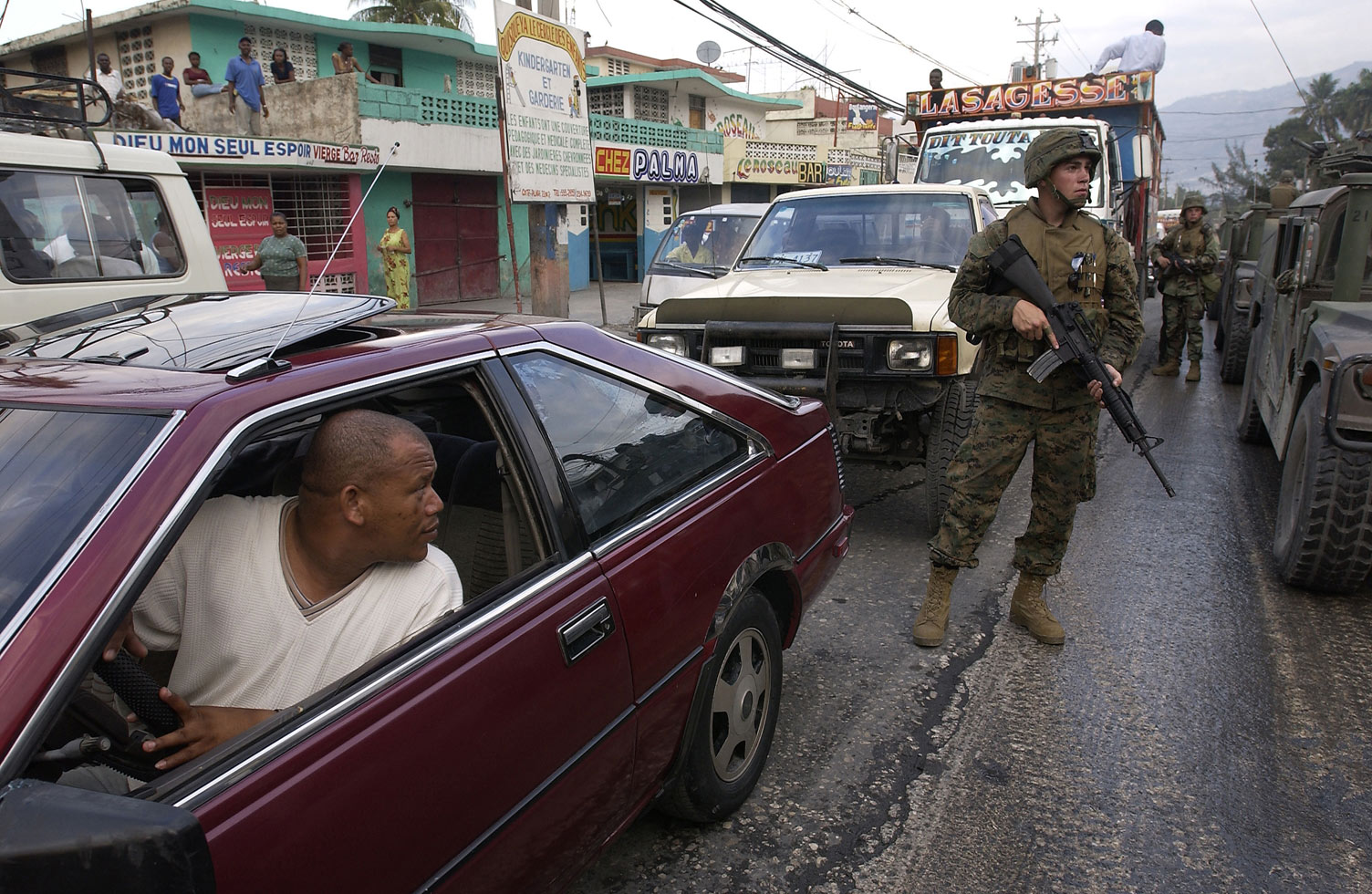
- U.S. Marines patrol the streets of Port-au-Prince on 9 March 2004
Date	29 February 2004
Location	Haiti
Result	Coup successful: Jean-Bertrand Aristide overthrown; Interim government assumes power with international backing

Belligerents
Republic of Haiti	National Revolutionary Front for the Liberation of Haiti	United States; Chile; Canada; France; Brazil; United Nations

Commanders and leaders
(Haiti) Jean-Bertrand Aristide (Haiti) Yvon Neptune	(Haiti) Buteur Métayer; (Haiti) Louis-Jodel Chamblain; (Haiti) Guy Philippe	(United States) George W. Bush; (United Nations) (Chile) Juan Gabriel Valdés; (United Nations) (Brazil) Augusto Heleno

Casualties and losses
- At least 80 Haitians killed

A coup d'état in Haiti on 29 February 2004, following several weeks of conflict, resulted in the removal of President Jean-Bertrand Aristide from office. On 5 February, a rebel group, called the National Revolutionary Front for the Liberation and Reconstruction of Haiti, took control of Haiti's fourth-largest city, Gonaïves. By 22 February, the rebels had captured Haiti's second-largest city, Cap-Haïtien and were besieging the capital, Port-au-Prince by the end of February. On the morning of 29 February, Aristide resigned under controversial circumstances and was flown from Haiti by U.S. military and security personnel. He went into exile, being flown directly to the Central African Republic, before eventually settling in South Africa. Following Aristide's departure, an interim government led by President Boniface Alexandre and Prime Minister Gérard Latortue was installed, and 2,700 foreign troops were deployed to Haiti under the U.S.-led Operation Secure Tomorrow to stop the breakdown of public order. The operation was later replaced by the United Nations Stabilisation Mission in Haiti.

Aristide, while still being the most popular politician in Haiti, faced growing opposition after the 1990s. His political party Fanmi Lavalas won the May 2000 parliamentary election, though the results of some Senate races were disputed by opposition parties because of how the votes were tabulated by the Provisional Electoral Council. They also claimed that the council was not independent. The government still certified the results, and the opposition boycotted the November 2000 presidential election, in which Aristide was re-elected for a second term.

Although the Senate vote tabulation was not believed to have changed the outcome of those races, the government was criticized for its lack of a response by the Organization of American States (OAS), the United States, Canada, and the European Union, which suspended foreign aid to Haiti. The Aristide administration agreed to a plan negotiated with the U.S. to address election-related concerns, but the opposition refused to cooperate for years, and foreign aid was withheld because of the delay. There were also anti-government demonstrations in 2002, 2003, and 2004, which became increasingly violent. A rebellion broke out, which included a core of ex-army paramilitary groups that had been disbanded during Aristide's presidency due to their history of committing atrocities and involvement in the 1991 military coup. The Haitian National Police became outgunned and outnumbered by the rebels and gangs.

Aristide afterwards claimed that he had been kidnapped by U.S. forces, accusing them of having orchestrated a coup d'état against him, a claim denied by U.S. officials. In 2022, a dozen Haitian and French officials told The New York Times that Aristide's earlier calls for reparations had caused France to side with Aristide's opponents and collaborate with the United States to remove him from power. This claim was, however, denied by the United States Ambassador to Haiti at the time, James Brendan Foley. After the coup, Haiti experienced worsening political, economic, and humanitarian crises, and increased foreign involvement in its politics. Before 2004, there had been two peaceful transitions of power from one elected Haitian president to another, in 1996 and 2001. Since 2004 there has only been one, in 2011.

== Events prior to the coup d'état ==
=== Controversy over elections in 2000 ===
The May 2000 general election resulted in a sweep of 7,500 political offices in Haiti by Fanmi Lavalas (FL), the political party founded by former president Jean-Bertrand Aristide in 1996. Their opposition was divided, and Aristide had been the most popular politician in Haiti since his victory in December 1990 presidential election. The Organization of American States (OAS) observer mission initially described the elections as a success. However, the opposition in Haiti accused FL and the Provisional Electoral Council (CEP) of election fraud, and later so did Europe and the United States. Haitian electoral law required a run-off if no candidate won over 50% of the vote in the first round, but in some of the races for the nineteen Senate seats, the council only counted the votes of the top four candidates in each department race instead of the votes for every candidate. This change in vote tabulation benefited FL, and other concerns were also raised, such as the independence of the council. The National Coalition for Haitian Rights (NCHR) also stated that there were delays in the distribution of voter identification cards. U.S. Congressman John Conyers wrote:

Unfortunately, there were irregularities that occurred in the election and there is a post-election problem of the vote count that is threatening to undo the democratic work of the citizens of Haiti. Without doubt there were irregularities that occurred in the election which have been conceded by the CEP.

The Senate vote tabulation has been described as a small technicality that would not have changed the outcome of those races, but it turned into an international controversy. Based on some of the Senate races, the OAS observer mission later characterized the election as flawed and asked the Haitian government to address the concerns. The government ignored the request and the certified the results, causing the OAS to withdraw its observer mission. The leading opposition parties – including Espace de Concertation (EC) of Evans Paul and Serge Gilles, the National Christian Movement of Haiti (MOCHRENA), the Struggling People's Organization (OPL) of Gérard Pierre-Charles, and Rally of Progressive National Democrats (RNDP) of Leslie Manigat – declared a boycott of the November 2000 presidential election. Some of the opposition later formed the coalition Convergence Démocratique (CD). The coalition demanded the resignation of President René Préval and the annulment of the entire May election for all 7,500 offices, not just the disputed ones. CD was a mix of social democratic, right-wing, business-linked, or neo-Duvalierist factions with little public support, viewed by many as a creation of the urban-based political elite. Aristide's supporters claim that an opposition boycott of the election was used as a ploy in order to discredit it.

In response to this controversy, in September 2000 the U.S. and Canada decided to not provide any assistance for the presidential election. European nations suspended government-to-government assistance to Haiti. The U.S. Congress banned any U.S. assistance from being channeled through the Haitian government, codifying an existing situation. Ultimately $500 million in foreign aid was suspended. Aristide won another presidential term with over 90% of the vote in the November election, which was not funded or observed by international partners, against several unknown candidates. The high voter turnout was rejected by the opposition and questioned by foreign diplomats. Aristide met with U.S. National Security Advisor Anthony Lake and reached an agreement to hold Senate run-off elections, and to appoint a cabinet and an election council that included the opposition. The plan was later endorsed by the George W. Bush administration and the OAS. Although the Aristide government took measures to implement the agreement, the opposition represented by CD refused to participate in the process, and it had allies in the U.S. Congress. Even after Aristide convinced several FL senators to resign, the foreign aid to Haiti was not restored.

The Ottawa Initiative on Haiti was a conference hosted by Canada that took place at Meech Lake, Quebec (a federal government resort near Ottawa) on 31 January and 1 February 2003, to decide the future of Haiti's government, though no Haitian government officials were invited. Journalist Michel Vastel leaked information about the conference that he says was told to him by his friend and conference host Denis Paradis, Canada's Secretary of State for Latin America, Africa, and the French-speaking world, in his 15 March 2003, article in Quebec news magazine L'actualité. In the article, he claims that the officials at the conference wanted to see regime change in Haiti in less than a year. "Michel Vastel wrote that the possibility of Aristide's departure, the need for a potential trusteeship over Haiti, and the return of Haiti's dreaded military were discussed by Paradis and the French Minister for La Francophonie, Pierre-André Wiltzer." Paradis later denied this, but neither Vastel nor L'actualite retracted the story.

CD continued refusing to cooperate and demanded the resignation of Aristide right up until the coup, and some donors, such as the EU, continued blocking foreign aid over the election dispute despite worsening economic conditions in Haiti. At the same time, the government, which faced growing protests during 2003, used street gangs to attack the demonstrators. The Haitian National Police (PNH) was accused of human rights abuses and of being biased in the political dispute. Multiple protests by Haitian students were organized in 2002, 2003 and 2004 against the Aristide government. On 5 December 2003, some of Aristide's supporters, backed by the police according to witnesses, entered the social studies department of the Université d'État d'Haïti to attack students who were rallying for an anti-government protest later that day. Dozens of students were injured and the University dean had his legs broken. This event led to more protests by students, eventually joined by other groups. A student protest against Aristide on 7 January 2004 led to a clash with police and Aristide supporters that left two dead.

=== Aristide's request for reparations and other policies ===
In 2003, Aristide requested that France pay Haiti over US$21 billion in reparations, which he said was the equivalent in today's money Haiti was forced to pay Paris after winning independence from France 200 years ago.

The United Nations Security Council, of which France is a permanent member, rejected a 26 February 2004 appeal from the Caribbean Community (CARICOM) for international peacekeeping forces to be sent into its member state Haiti, but voted unanimously to send in troops three days later, just hours after Aristide's forced resignation.

"I believe that (the call for reparations) could have something to do with it, because they (France) were definitely not happy about it, and made some very hostile comments," Myrtha Desulme, chairperson of the Haiti-Jamaica Exchange Committee, told IPS. "(But) I believe that he did have grounds for that demand, because that is what started the downfall of Haiti," she says."

During Aristide's second administration in 2003, he doubled the minimum wage, which impacted over 20,000 people who worked in the Port-au-Prince assembly sector. Furthermore, the Aristide government launched a campaign to collect unpaid taxes and utility bills from Haiti’s wealthy population, seeking to reign in the business elite; such developments deeply unsettled the country’s aristocracy.

Following the 2004 Haitian coup d'état, the appointed provisional prime minister Gerard Latortue rescinded the reparations demand.

=== Security and cross-border paramilitary campaign ===
Both Aristide and his opposition had armed gangs. The role of right-wing paramilitary groups in violently targeting activists and government officials aligned with the Aristide government has been well documented. Freedom of Information Act documents have shown how paramilitary forces received support from sectors of Haiti's elite as well as from sectors of the Dominican military and government at the time. According to researcher Jeb Sprague, these groups also had contact with U.S. and French intelligence. One of their leaders was Louis-Jodel Chamblain, a founder of the paramilitary Front for the Advancement and Progress of Haïti (FRAPH), who was sentenced in absentia to life in prison for the murder of the activist Antoine Izmery in 1993. FRAPH had been created by Raoul Cédras during the military regime of the early 1990s to suppress both the pro-Aristide forces and other rivals. The Dominican-based paramilitary forces were involved in the assassination of the journalist Jean Dominique in 2000, the attack on the police academy in July 2001, and the attempted coup against Aristide in December 2001. Aristide's armed opposition eventually included defecting paramilitaries from his side, neo-Duvalierists, and/or drug lords, including the so-called Liberation Army, the Kosovo Army, and the Cannibal Army.

After abolishing the Armed Forces of Haiti (FAd'H) in December 1994, Aristide established the Haitian National Police (PNH). The early recruits of the new force received intensive training from French, Canadian, and U.S. forces, and initially performed well. However, Aristide replaced the professional leadership of the PNH in 1997 with a new one based on loyalty to himself, and overlooked corruption from those that were loyal to him. The U.S. foreign aid cut off to Haiti in 2000 included judicial and police assistance, and the PNH rapidly declined without direct support. The Haitian police became incompetent and corrupt, and some of its members were involved in drug trafficking. Aristide also used gangs against his opponents, and allowed former Duvalierist Tonton Macoutes paramilitary members to join both them and the PNH.

== Coup d'état ==
In September 2003, Amiot Métayer was found dead, his eyes shot out and his heart cut out, most likely the result of machete-inflicted wounds. He was, prior to his death, the leader of the Gonaives gang known as "The Cannibal Army." After his death, his brother Buteur Métayer swore vengeance against those he felt responsible for Amiot's death—namely, President Jean-Bertrand Aristide. Buteur took charge of the Cannibal Army and promptly renamed it the National Revolutionary Front for the Liberation of Haiti. In October 2003, France tasked philosopher Régis Debray with leading a commission in Haiti to improve bilateral relations, though strictly instructed him to not discuss potential reparations. In December 2003, Debray said that he had visited the presidential palace to warn Aristide not to have a fate like President of Chile Salvador Allende, who died during the 1973 Chilean coup, with the philosopher telling the president that the United States was planning his overthrow.

On 5 February 2004, this rebel group seized control of Haiti's fourth-largest city, Gonaïves, marking the beginning of a minor revolt against Aristide. During their sack of the city, they burned the police station and looted it for weapons and vehicles, which they used to continue their campaign down the coast. By 22 February, the rebels had captured Haiti's second-largest city, Cap-Haïtien. As the end of February approached, rebels threatened to take the capital, Port-au-Prince, fueling increasing political unrest and the building of barricades throughout the capital. Haitians fled their country on boats, seeking to get to the United States. The Haitian National Police collapsed during the rebel advance.

On the morning of 29 February, Deputy Chief of Mission Luis G. Moreno arrive at the presidential palace with Diplomatic Security Service officers and asked President Aristide for a resignation letter. The resignation letter was written in Haitian Creole and its wording was unclear. That same day, Canadian special forces secured Haiti's main airport after which Aristide was flown out of the country on a U.S. plane accompanied by US security personnel as the rebels took over the capital and was flown without knowledge of his route and destination. At the time of the flight, France contacted three African nations in attempts to accept Aristide, though they refused, with the Central African Republic ultimately accepting the ousted president who arrived in Bangui via Antigua.

Many international politicians, including members of the U.S. congress and the Jamaican Prime Minister, expressed concern that the United States had interfered with Haiti's democratic process, accusing them of removing Aristide with excessive force. According to Rep. Maxine Waters D-California, Mildred Aristide called her at her home at 6:30 am to inform her "the coup d'etat has been completed", and Jean-Bertrand Aristide said the U.S. Embassy in Haiti's chief of staff came to his house to say he would be killed "and a lot of Haitians would be killed" if he refused to resign immediately and said he "has to go now." Rep. Charles Rangel, D-New York expressed similar words, saying Aristide had told him he was "disappointed that the international community had let him down" and "that he resigned under pressure" – "As a matter of fact, he was very apprehensive for his life. They made it clear that he had to go now or he would be killed." When asked for his response to these statements Colin Powell said that "it might have been better for members of Congress who have heard these stories to ask us about the stories before going public with them so we don't make a difficult situation that much more difficult" and he alleged that Aristide "did not democratically govern or govern well". Jamaican Prime Minister P. J. Patterson released a statement saying "we are bound to question whether his resignation was truly voluntary, as it comes after the capture of sections of Haiti by armed insurgents and the failure of the international community to provide the requisite support. The removal of President Aristide in these circumstances sets a dangerous precedent for democratically elected governments anywhere and everywhere, as it promotes the removal of duly elected persons from office by the power of rebel forces."

== Aftermath ==
Following Aristide's resignation under U.S. and French pressure, Supreme Court Chief Justice Boniface Alexandre succeeded him as interim president under a Haitian constitutional provision for presidential vacancies. He was supported by a seven-member council set up in accordance with a plan from the Caribbean Community to restore political stability, which interviewed three candidates for a new prime minister. They included Hérard Abraham, a former general in the disbanded Haitian army; Smarck Michel, a former prime minister under Aristide; and Gérard Latortue, a businessman and former foreign minister. Latortue was selected as prime minister, and he spoke in Gonaïves a week after the coup, alongside Louis-Jodel Chamblain. He called the neo-Duvalierists "freedom fighters" and asked for a moment of silence for those that died "fighting against the dictatorship." A number of figures from Haiti's past re-appeared in government after the rebellion, including Hérard Abraham at the Ministry of the Interior, Williams Régala (a former aide to Henri Namphy) and Colonel Henri-Robert Marc-Charles, a member of the post-1991 military junta.

Alexandre petitioned the UN Security Council for the intervention of an international peacekeeping force. The Security Council passed a resolution the same day, "[t]aking note of the resignation of Jean-Bertrand Aristide as President of Haiti and the swearing-in of President Boniface Alexandre as the acting President of Haiti in accordance with the Constitution of Haiti" and authorized such a mission. To prevent the breakdown of public order, under Operation Secure Tomorrow a force of about 1,700 United States Marines arrived in Haïti within the day, and 1,000 Canadian, French and Chilean troops were also sent. Some of the deployed Marines were of Haitian origin and they provided the force with local language and cultural knowledge. On 1 June 2004, the peacekeeping mission was passed to MINUSTAH and comprised a 7000-person force led by Brazil and backed up by Argentina, Chile, Jordan, Morocco, Nepal, Peru, Philippines, Spain, Sri Lanka and Uruguay.

=== Continued violence ===
The interim government was incapable of restoring the rule of law and public safety, and had to rely on assistance from international peacekeeping forces, which were too few to maintain stability in the entire country. The Haitian National Police, described by Human Rights Watch as "a demoralized and discredited force by the end of the Aristide presidency", was under-equipped, poorly trained, and outgunned and outnumbered by street gangs, former soldiers, and other armed groups. Police officers were also accused of human rights violations. There was an escalation in violence in the fall of 2004, including from some gangs that claimed to be supporters of the deposed president Aristide. As of August 2005, neither the PNH nor the foreign peacekeepers had arrested the heavily armed former paramilitary members, who remained at large. In August 2006, the administration of René Préval adopted a police reform plan.

In November 2004, the University of Miami School of Law carried out a Human Rights Investigation in Haiti and documented serious human rights abuses. It stated that "Summary executions are a police tactic." It also stated the following:

U.S. officials blame the crisis on armed gangs in the poor neighborhoods, not the official abuses and atrocities, nor the unconstitutional ouster of the elected president. Their support for the interim government is not surprising, as top officials, including the Minister of Justice, worked for U.S. government projects that undermined their elected predecessors. Coupled with the U.S. government's development assistance embargo from 2000–2004, the projects suggest a disturbing pattern.

On 15 October 2005, Brazil called for more troops to be sent due to the worsening situation in the country.

== CARICOM ==
CARICOM (Caribbean Community) governments denounced the removal of Aristide from government. They also questioned the legality of the new government. The Prime Minister of Jamaica, P. J. Patterson, said that the episode set "a dangerous precedent for democratically elected governments anywhere and everywhere, as it promotes the removal of duly elected persons from office by the power of rebel forces."

As reported by the BBC, on 3 March 2004, CARICOM called for an independent inquiry into the departure of former Haitian President Jean-Bertrand Aristide and says it would not be sending peacekeepers. Patterson said there had been no indication during discussions with the U.S. and France that the plan which CARICOM had put forward prior to Aristide's departure was not acceptable. "In respect of our partners we can only say this, at no time in our discussions did they convey to us that the plan was unacceptable so long as president Aristide remained in office. Nor did they suggest to us anything of a nature pertaining to the conduct of President Aristide in office that would cause us to come to the judgment ourselves that he was unsuited to be the President of Haïti," Mr. Patterson said. The U.S. and France have been accused of using pressure on CARICOM to not make a formal UN request for an investigation into the circumstances surrounding Aristide's removal.

The CARICOM initially refused to recognize the interim government, but in 2006 the newly elected René Préval resumed his country's membership in the organization.

== French and U.S. involvement ==
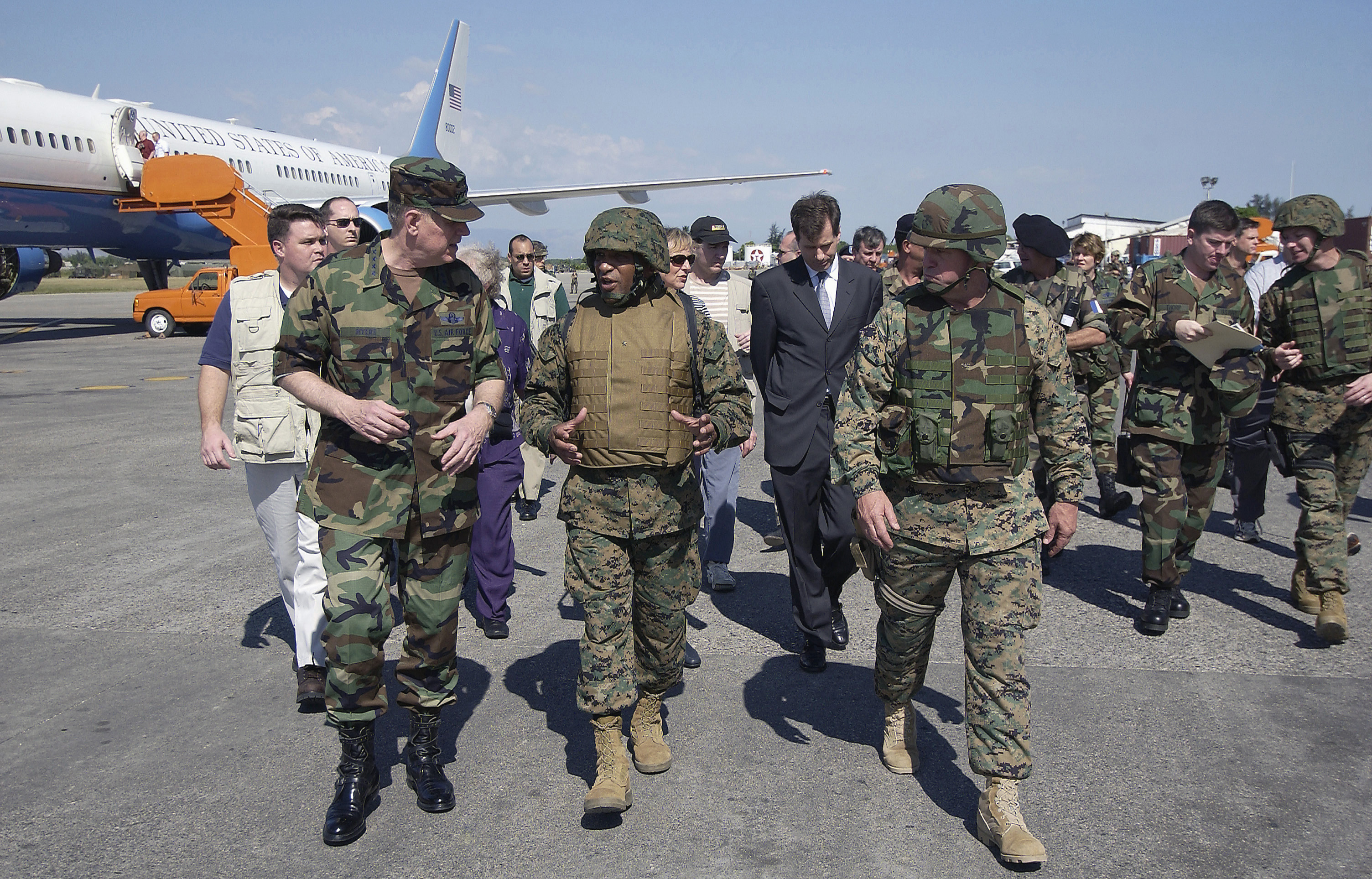
Chairman of the Joint Chiefs of Staff General Richard B. Myers inspecting U.S. troops deployed as part of peacekeeping operations in Haiti on 13 March 2004

In 2022, the French ambassador to Haiti at the time, Thierry Burkard, told The New York Times, that France and the United States had "effectively orchestrated "a coup" against Aristide by pressuring him to step down and taking him into exile". He stated French involvement was likely partly motivated by Aristide's call for reparations from France. Another French ambassador, Philippe Selz, told the paper that the decision "to extradite" President Aristide had been made in advance. In response to The New York Times reporting, James Brendan Foley, United States Ambassador to Haiti at the time of the coup, criticized the report's allegation that the U.S. had collaborated with France to overthrow Aristide, stating that "no evidence was presented in support of such a historically consequential claim". He called the claims by the French officials untrue, stating that it was never U.S. policy to remove Aristide. He said that Aristide had requested a U.S. rescue and that the decision to "dispatch a plane to carry him to safety" had been agreed upon following night-time discussions at the behest of Aristide.

On 1 March 2004, US congresswoman Maxine Waters, along with Aristide family friend Randall Robinson, reported that Aristide had told them (using a smuggled cellular phone), that he had been forced to resign and abducted from the country by the United States. He said he had been held hostage by an armed military guard.

Aristide later repeated the same thing, in an interview with Amy Goodman of Democracy Now! on 16 March. Goodman asked Aristide if he resigned, and President Aristide replied: "No, I didn't resign. What some people call 'resignation' is a 'new coup d'état,' or 'modern kidnapping.'"

Many supporters of the Fanmi Lavalas party and Aristide, as well as some foreign supporters, denounced the rebellion as a foreign controlled coup d'état orchestrated by Canada, France and the United States deletto remove a democratically elected president. Some have come forward to support his claim saying they witnessed him being escorted out by American soldiers at gunpoint. Economist Jeffrey Sachs wrote that "this U.S. administration froze all multilateral development assistance to Haiti ... U.S. officials surely knew that the aid embargo would mean a balance-of-payments crisis, a rise in inflation and a collapse of living standards, all of which fed the rebellion."

Sources close to Aristide also claim the Bush administration blocked attempts to reinforce his bodyguards. The Steele Foundation, the San Francisco-based organization which supplied Aristide's bodyguards, declined to comment.

According to a Washington Times article of April 2004:

Mr. Aristide, who accuses the United States and France of conspiring to force him out of power, filed a lawsuit in Paris last week accusing unnamed French officials of 'death threats, kidnapping and sequestration' in connection with his flight to Africa. The Bush administration insists that Mr. Aristide had personally asked for help and voluntarily boarded a U.S. plane. 'He drafted and signed his letter of resignation all by himself and then voluntarily departed with his wife and his own security team,' Mr. Powell said.

The US denied the accusations. "He was not kidnapped," Secretary of State Colin Powell said. "We did not force him onto the airplane. He went on the airplane willingly and that's the truth." The kidnapping claim is "absolutely false," concurred Parfait Mbaye, the communications minister for the Central African Republic, where Aristide's party was taken. The minister told CNN that Aristide had been granted permission to land in the country after Aristide himself – as well as the U.S. and French governments – requested it.

According to the US, as the rebels approached the capital, James B. Foley, U.S. ambassador to Haiti, got a phone call from a high-level aide to Aristide, asking if the U.S. could protect Aristide and help facilitate his departure if he resigned. The call prompted a series of events that included a middle-of-the-night phone call to President Bush and a scramble to find a plane to carry Aristide into exile. Foley said that he traveled voluntarily via motorcade to the airport with his own retinue of security guards, including some contracted Americans. Before takeoff, Aristide gave a copy of his resignation letter to Foley's aide.

The Associated Press reported that the Central African Republic tried to get Aristide to stop repeating his charges to the press.

Aristide has also denied that a letter he left behind constitutes an official resignation. "There is a document that was signed to avoid a bloodbath, but there was no formal resignation," he said. "This political kidnapping was the price to pay to avoid a bloodbath." According to the US embassy translation it reads "Tonight I am resigning in order to avoid a bloodbath. I accept to leave, with the hope that there will be life and not death." A slightly different translation was given by Albert Valdman, a linguistics professor and specialist in Haitian Creole at Indiana University in Bloomington, Ind. "If tonight it is my resignation that will avoid a bloodbath, I accept to leave with the hope that there will be life and not death."

== See also ==
- Emmanuel Wilmer
- List of wars: 2003–present
- United Nations Stabilization Mission in Haiti
- 2001 Haitian coup attempt
