= 2006 Haitian general election =

- 7 February 2006
- Presidential election
- Registered: 3,533,430
- Turnout: 59.26% (▼19.01pp)
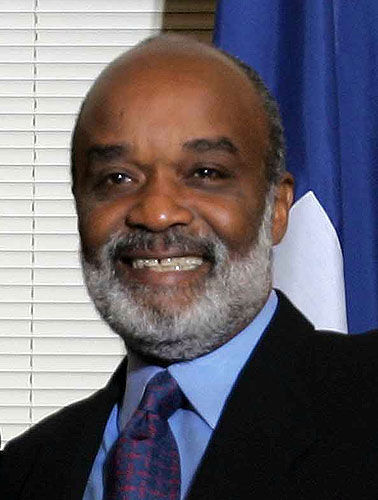

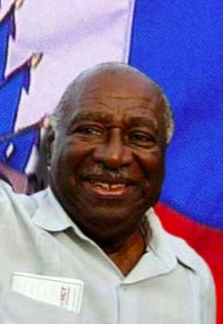

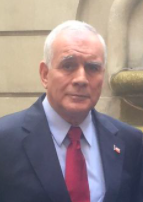

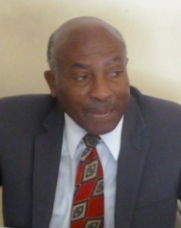
Nominee	René Préval	Leslie Manigat
Party	Lespwa	RPND
Popular vote	992,796	240,306
Percentage	51.21%	12.40%
Nominee	Charles-Henri Baker	Jean Chavannes Jeune
Party	Respect	UNCRH
Popular vote	159,683	108,283
Percentage	8.24%	5.59%
President before election
Boniface Alexandre
Independent
Elected President
René Préval
Lespwa

General elections were held in Haiti on 7 February 2006 to elect the replacements for the interim government of Gérard Latortue, which had been put in place after the 2004 Haiti rebellion. The elections were delayed four times, having originally been scheduled for October and November 2005. Voters elected a president, all 99 seats in the Chamber of Deputies of Haiti and all 30 seats in the Senate of Haiti. Voter turnout was around 60%. Run-off elections for the Chamber of Deputies of Haiti were held on 21 April, with around 28% turnout.

According to official statistics, René Préval of the Lespwa coalition led the count for President with 48.8% of the vote, less than the 50% needed to be declared elected on the first round. Préval spoke of fraud, and voting bags and marked ballots found in a garbage dump triggered street protests by his supporters. The United Nations Mission in Haiti spoke of an "apparent grave breach of the electoral process". On 16 February, following meetings between the electoral council and the interim government, it was agreed that blank ballots would be excluded from the percentage calculations, resulting in a total vote for Preval of 51.1%. A second round of voting for president was thus avoided.

== Background ==
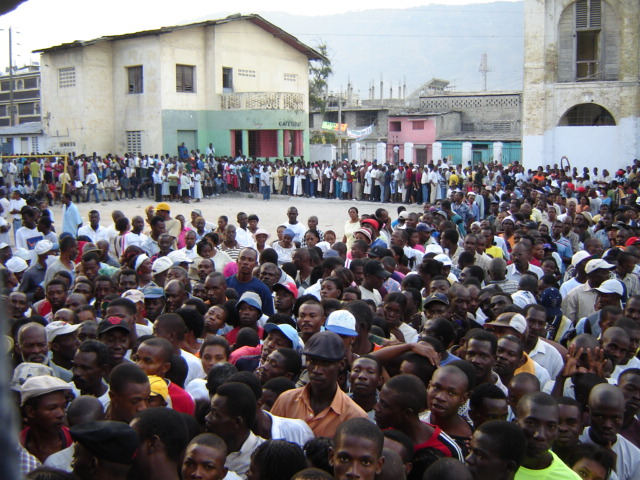
2006 Haitian elections

The election process saw many controversies, including threats to boycott by one of the major political parties, ongoing political violence, and one candidate being declared ineligible despite a Supreme Court decision.

The elections took place as Haiti was under the occupation of MINUSTAH, a multi-national U.N. force established by the Security Council which started operations in June 2004.

On election day, due to many organizational problems, a shortage of election workers, missing ballots, and extremely long line-ups, the voting hours were extended by at least two hours.

There are many reasons the Haitian elections were delayed. Due to a lack of funding, election officials were not able to meet the voter registration deadline set for early August. In addition there was considerable unrest in parts of Haiti, particularly the Port-au-Prince slums where there were attacks on the new government, and where the U.N. and the Haitian National Police have been accused of committing massacres and targeted killings of anti-occupation protesters and organizers. However, the inability to register voters in the time allocated was the primary reason for the extensions. There was also concern that only 800-900 voting stations would be placed throughout Haiti, in comparison to the many thousands of stations that existed during the previous election.

On January 25, 2006, Haiti's election authorities announced that no voting stations would be placed in Cité Soleil, an impoverished area which holds between three and six hundred thousand residents and has been controlled by informal armies professing allegiance to Aristide; registered voters from Cité Soleil had to leave their neighborhood to vote.

=== Delays ===
Elections in Haiti were originally scheduled to take place starting on October 9, 2005 with the municipal election, followed by national elections on November 13, 2005, and a second round on December 18. In August the electoral council decided to move the municipal elections to an undetermined date in late December to allow for more focus to be placed on meeting the (new) November 6 date for presidential elections. On September 7 the dates were again changed, this time for the presidential elections. The first round of voting was moved back to November 20 and the second round on January 3, 2006. On November 18 the date for presidential and legislative elections were postponed for the third time; they were to take place on December 27, with a run-off to be held on January 31, 2006. On November 25, the date was set back yet again, making this the fourth time total; they were to take place on January 8 and February 15, 2006, respectively. The election is being postponed yet again but a date has not yet been announced, although February 7, 2006 is reported to be the likely date for the first round. The municipal elections which were originally set to be held on December 11, 2005, have been postponed to March 5, 2006. When announced officially, they will be the fifth set of election dates for a new government since July. Originally, the hand-over of power to the elected government was set for February 7, 2006, but this date has also been pushed back, without an official new date being given. The first round of elections for president and parliament was finally held on 7 February 2006. Runoff elections for Chamber of Deputies of Haiti were held on April 21.

== Presidential candidates ==
Thirty five presidential candidates appeared in the ballot. Among the more known figures were René Préval, a former prime minister (1994–1995) and president (1996–2000), and a Lavalas member; Guy Philippe, a former police chief and rebel leader of the 2004 Haiti Rebellion.

=== René Préval ===
Préval is a former president of Haiti who served from 1996 to 2000. He is the second president of Haiti to leave office due to the natural expiration of his term. Préval was in exile during the latter years of the dictatorship of Jean-Claude Duvalier but returned to work in charitable organizations after Duvalier's fall. He served as Prime Minister under Aristide during his first term, until the military coup d'état that overthrew Aristide in 1991. In 1996 he was elected president under the Fanmi Lavalas party and served out his term ending in 2001.

Under his previous administration Préval was a big reformer, most notably in the privatization of government companies, and will be expected to continue down a similar path if he is to be elected for a second term. His dealings with the International Monetary Fund have been controversial. The unemployment rate in Haiti was quite high under Préval's previous government, but it did fall down to some of its lowest levels since the fall of Duvalier at the end of his term and continued to fall until the rebellion of 2004.

During his campaign, he sought to distance himself from any former association with the Lavalas party and ran as a candidate of Lespwa. Preval supports the current occupation of Haiti by U.N. forces, saying they "should stay as long as it is necessary", in contrast to Aristide and many members of Lavalas who denounce the U.N. forces and accuse them of carrying out a campaign of repression and violence at the behest of the U.S., France, and Canada. Preval has also sought the votes of Lavalas members on the promise that he will not oppose the return of Jean Bertrand Aristide from South Africa.

=== Charles Henri Baker ===
Charles-Henry Jean-Marie Baker (born June 3, 1955 in Port-au Prince) is a Haitian industrialist with US residency. He initially billed himself as an independent and has allied himself with the Komba de Chavannes Jean Baptiste and Evans Lescouflair party. His coalition received 8.24% of the vote. Baker is a former member of Groupe 184, a loose federation of business leaders, church officials and NGOs associated with the US federal government funded USAID and NED, opposed to the Jean-Bertrand Aristide government in 2004. Baker is widely considered the candidate of choice of Haiti's wealthy ruling class as well as the favoured candidate of the international business community.

=== Leslie François Manigat ===
Manigat received 12.40% of the vote in 2006. He was previously elected president in 1988 under a corrupt military run election after the fall of Jean-Claude Duvalier's dictatorship. He came to power in what was an extremely low turnout, and just a few months later Manigat's government was overthrown by General Henri Namphy. Manigat spent 23 years in exile during the reign of François Duvalier. In 1979 he formed a political party in Caracas with other exiled political opponents called the Rally of National Progressive Democrats. In 1987 the first attempt at a democratic election was unsuccessful as 34 people were killed. Elections were postponed until February 1988 and Manigat won with many political parties boycotting the polls. He had the backing of the military but once in office he sought greater control over the military in an effort, according to him, to crack down on corruption. Following the coup d'état by General Namphy, Manigat worked as guest scholar in Washington D.C., Paris, and Geneva.

=== Guy Philippe ===
Philippe is best known for his role in the 2004 Haiti Rebellion which overthrew the government of Jean-Bertrand Aristide due to, in part, allegations of election fraud in the 2000 parliamentary elections and other issues. Philippe's involvement can be traced back to 2000 when he was forced to flee to the Dominican Republic after taking part in a failed coup attempt against the first administration of Rene Preval. He had been a police chief in Cap-Haïtien when he was accused again of masterminding another coup attempt against the Aristide government in December 2001, which he denies any involvement in but proof would point otherwise. Throughout 2001-2004 Philippe is said to have worked the rebels that were running a "contra" war in the Plateau Central assassinating Lavalas officials and family members. When unrest/insurgency turned to rebellion in 2004, Philippe publicly announced that he was joining with coup forces and quickly took a leadership role, which he shared with co-leader Louis-Jodel Chamblain, who is considered a notorious war criminal by some. After Aristide was removed from the country in a US registered plane, Philippe and his army put down their guns in favor of the UN peacekeeping force. He has also been accused of drug dealing, and Aristide supporter group claim he is a covert CIA spy, recruited by an agent in Haiti to start the coup. It has been reported that he had secret meetings with opposition groups of Aristide in the Dominican Republic and also with a CIA agent.

On July 11, 2005, Guy Philippe announced he would run for president for the Front for National Reconstruction (FRN) party. The FRN is also his guerilla group which was involved in the rebellion of 2004. Early in 2005 the FRN became recognized as a political party. Philippe has been critical of the administration of the interim government, blaming them for the slow process of setting up registration centers throughout the country. Early on he was considered a frontrunner in the race but later fell behind the main contenders. In the end in spite of his international and local rebellion backers, and in spite of appealing to young Haitians to follow him, Phillippe won less than 1% of the vote, demonstrating that he was no popular hero and was only the leader of a false, mercenary rebel group.

=== Marc Bazin ===
Bazin is a former Minister of Finance and Economy under the dictatorship of Jean-Claude Duvalier, and has also served as an official for the World Bank. In the 1990 elections Bazin received 14% of the votes, losing out to Jean-Bertrand Aristide. During the temporary coup d'état that replaced Aristide in 1991, Bazin was selected as the Prime Minister.

Bazin is a conservative politician who has sought to bring foreign investment into Haiti. For the 2006 elections he is running in an alliance with his MIDH (Mouvement pour l'Instauration de la Démocratie en Haïti) party and the popular Fanmi Lavalas. Bazin has been a bitter enemy of Aristide so it is somewhat surprising that this alliance has formed. There is evidence on the basis of Freedom of Information Act requests in the USA that the United States federal budget funded International Republican Institute (IRI) was involved in Bazin's campaign and has more generally been widely involved in organising political parties in Haiti.

=== Ineligible candidates ===
==== Gérard Jean-Juste ====
Jean-Juste is a Roman Catholic priest, Liberation theologian and supporter of the Fanmi Lavalas party in Port-au-Prince. He is well known for his close relations with former president Jean-Bertrand Aristide. Jean-Juste is well loved by many Haitians in urban slums for the liberation theology and the support for the poor and children that he has preached. His church feeds hundreds of homeless children every day and like Aristide he has promoted a government policy of social investment in the poor.

Most recently, on July 21, 2005, he was arrested at a funeral by police in connection with the abduction and subsequent murder of journalist Jacques Roche. While Jean-Juste was at the funeral of Roche, he was assaulted by other attendees before being placed in protective custody by the police. Later he was charged with complicity and intellectual authorship of the murder. Jean-Juste was out of the country both at the time of Roche's abduction (July 10) and the discovery of his mutilated, bullet-riddled body (July 14). On July 28, 2005 Amnesty International named Jean-Juste a "prisoner of conscience". Father Jean-Juste remained in prison while his files were reviewed by judges. Formal charges were made against him based upon public outcry, a strange concept of French law. He was temporarily released for medical treatment in February 2006.

In August officials of the Fanmi Lavalas party threatened to boycott the elections if Jean-Juste, and other alleged political prisoners, were not released. They believe the arrest is an effort to prevent Lavalas from once again winning in elections. In September, the party attempted to register Jean-Juste as a candidate for president, but they were denied. The provisional electoral council said that electoral law requires candidates to register in person. This situation has continued, whereas some hardline members of the party are still considering boycott, while only a few FL officials supported Marc Bazin; though the members of the general population who identify themselves as Lavalas supporters will likely vote for René Préval. On February 7, 2006, Jean-Juste formally endorsed Rene Preval.

==== Dumarsais Siméus ====
Siméus is a wealthy businessman, owning Simeus Foods in Fort Worth, Texas, in the United States. Originally he is from Pont-Sondé in Haiti, where he grew up working the land for his poor rice-farming father. Eventually they moved to the USA so that Demarsais could go to college, and he eventually graduated from Howard University with an electrical engineering degree. Politically, Siméus developed extensive ties to the U.S. Bush administration, including serving on Jeb Bush's Haiti Task Force and making major donations to the Republican Party. His campaign manager, Robert Allyn, worked on the campaigns for George W. Bush. Siméus declared his intention to run for president of Haiti in September 2005 as the candidate for the Tet Ansanm party.

There has been some controversy over whether or not Siméus is qualified to run for president. Under the 1987 constitution a presidential candidate must have lived in a real property that they own in Haiti for a period of five years prior to the date of election. Of course Siméus has not lived in Haiti for that length of time. The Supreme Court has ruled, now twice, that Siméus' name should be added to the ballot because he qualifies due to special circumstances, but the election officials have refused because he holds U.S. citizenship and the constitution forbids foreign nationals from running. Following the second ruling, the provisional government dismissed five justices, which many believe was done as punishment. One problem of getting Siméus on the ballot is that it would mean that elections would have to be delayed further than their scheduled January 8 date because the ballots have already been printed. Siméus responded critically to the dismissal of the justices, calling it a violation of the separation of powers.

Siméus is a popular figure with many Haitians living in the United States and Canada because he is seen as an outsider who has not (yet) been infected with the corruption that insiders are already a part of. Indeed, this is a major part of Siméus' campaign as he says, "The politics of the last 200 years has failed. The status quo has created a cycle of poverty and violence, illiteracy and economic failure in Haiti, hurting our people, breaking our spirit, threatening the lives and futures of our brothers and sisters. In the past we have had politics of division hate, poverty and greed, politics that tear things down... now Haiti needs to make a change, heading in a new direction of unity, hope and prosperity." Due to the issues with getting on the ballot, Siméus has not had the opportunity to develop a clear strategy in his campaign, but he has touched on issues of economic recovery, providing clean water, and better health care for all. Siméus is the only known candidate who used the internet to promote his candidacy, using a web blog operated at his official site. His company Simeus Food International formerly known as TLC Beatrice Food was bought by private US investment banks that sought to capitalize on the classification of the company as a minority-owned business, he does not own a majority stake in the company, nor does he run the daily operations, he is kept as an honorary chairman. He has publicly called for the executive members of the US installed Boniface-Latortue administration to be arrested for not letting him participate in the elections after the Haitian Court of Appeals has ruled that he was to be reinstated in the candidate roster. Gerard Latortue sidestepped the ruling by a decree that calls for a commission on nationality to meet the legal standards in the Haitian constitution that bans foreign or candidates with double nationality as is the case of Dumarsais Simeus and George Samir Mourra who are both US citizens by naturalization process. He did not support any of the running candidate since his political partner Gerard Gougues had dropped out of the race to support him, their party Tet-Ansam is a minority party in Haiti.

=== Full list of presidential candidates ===
1. Charles Henri Baker - Regwoupman Sitwayen Pou Espwa - RESPÈ
2. Marc Bazin - Mouvement pour l'Instauration de la Démocracie en Haïti - MIDH
3. Bonivert Claude - Parti Social Rénové - PSR
4. Paul Denis - Organisation du Peuple en Lutte - OPL
5. Hubert de Ronceray - Grand Front Centre Droit - GFCD
6. Rigaud Duplan - Justice pour la Paix et le Développement National - JPDN
7. Reynold Georges - Alliance pour la Libération et l’Avancement d’Haïti- ALAH
8. Serge Gilles - Fusion des Sociaux-Démocrates Haïtienne - FUSION
9. Gérard Gourgue - Mouvement Union Patriotique - MUP
10. Chavannes Jeune - Union Nationale Chrétienne pour la Reconstruction d’Haïti - UNION
11. Leslie Manigat - Rassemblement des Démocrats Nationaux Progressistes - RDNP
12. Luc Mésadieu - Mouvement Chrétien pour une Nouvelle Haïti - MOCHRENHA
13. Nicolas Evans - Union pour la Reconstruction Nationale - URN
14. Evans Paul - Alyans Demokratik - ALYANS
15. Guy Philippe - Front pour la Reconstruction Nationale - FRN
16. René Préval - Fwon Lespwa - FL
17. Himmler Rébu - Rassemblement pour l’Évolution d’Haïti - GREH
18. Franck Romain - Parti Camp Patriotique et l'Alliance Haïtienne - PACAPALAH
19. Dany Toussaint - Mouvement Démocratique et Réformiste Haïtien - MODEREH

== Opinion polls ==
Two opinion polls were taken in November 2005. The first to be released was the poll taken by CID Gallup, a Latin American polling group with close ties to U.S. based Gallup. The second polling was taken by a political consulting firm, The Democracy Group, on behalf of the National Organization for the Advancement of Haitians, a group for the restoration of democracy in Haiti, of which Dumarsais Siméus is a member.

CID-Gallup

Candidate	Party	Votes	%
René Préval	Lespwa	384	32%
Dumarsais Siméus	Tet Ansanm	252	21%
Leslie Manigat	RDNP	60	5%
Marc Bazin	MIDH	48	4%
Serge Gilles	Fusion des Sociaux-démocrates	48	4%
Evans Paul	Democratic Alliance	48	4%
Guy Philippe	FRN	48	4%
Charles Henri Baker	Independent	24	2%
Dany Toussaint	MODEREH	24	2%
Other	--	264	22%
Totals		1,200	

NOAH-TDG

Candidate	Party	Votes	%
Dumarsais Siméus	Tet Ansanm	--	34%
René Préval	Lespwa	--	30%
Charles-Henry Baker	Independent	--	7%
Marc Bazin	MIDH	--	5%
Evans Paul	Democratic Alliance	--	5%
Other	--	--	19%
Totals		--	

== Results ==
=== President ===
Candidate	Party	Votes	%
René Préval	Lespwa	992,766	51.21
Leslie Manigat	Rally of Progressive National Democrats	240,306	12.40
Charles Henri Baker	Respect	159,683	8.24
Jean Chavannes Jeune	Christian National Union for the Reconstruction of Haiti	108,283	5.59
Luc Mesadieu	Christian Movement for a New Haiti	64,850	3.35
Serge Gilles	Fusion of Haitian Social Democrats	50,796	2.62
Paul Denis	Struggling People's Organization	50,751	2.62
Evans Paul	Democratic Alliance Party	48,232	2.49
Guy Philippe	National Reconstruction Front	37,303	1.92
Luc Fleurinord	Independent Movement for National Reconciliation	36,912	1.90
Joseph Hubert de Ronceray	Broad Centre Right Front	18,459	0.95
Marc Bazin	Movement for the Establishment of Democracy in Haiti	13,136	0.68
Rigaud Duplan	Justice for Peace and National Development	9,791	0.51
René Julien	Democratic Action to Build Haiti	8,608	0.44
Dany Toussaint	Haitian Democratic and Reformist Movement	7,905	0.41
Judie Joe C. Marie Roy	Patriotic Regrouping for National Renewal	7,889	0.41
Philippe Jean-Hérold Buteau	National Reconstruction Movement	6,543	0.34
Franck François Romain	Patriotic Party and the Haitian Alliance	6,524	0.34
Frantz Perpignan	Christian Democratic Party of Haiti	6,296	0.32
Gérard Gourgue	Patriotic Union Movement	5,852	0.30
Édouard Francisque	Unity of the Haitian Progressive Nationalists	5,518	0.28
Jean Marie Chérestal	Pont	5,490	0.28
Déjean Bélizaire	National Patriotic Movement of 28 November	4,478	0.23
Turneb J. Delpé	National Democratic and Progressive Party	4,466	0.23
Marc Antoine Destin	Movement for the Advancement, Development and Democratic Innovation of Haiti	4,210	0.22
Joël Borgella	Haitian Organization for the Advancement of Haiti	4,073	0.21
Nicolas Evans	Union for National Reconstruction	4,050	0.21
Himmler Rébu	Grand Rally for the Evolution of Haiti	3,774	0.19
Charles Poisset Romain	Front Civic Politic Haitian	3,622	0.19
Bonivert Claude	Renovated Social Party	3,442	0.18
Raoul Libéris	Nationalist Movement Progressive Haitian	3,270	0.17
Emmanuel Justima	Democratic Action	3,038	0.16
Yves Maret Saint-Louis	Party for Haitian National Evolution	2,969	0.15
Reynold Georges	Alliance for the Liberation and Advancement of Haiti	2,942	0.15
Jean-Jacques Sylvain	Party of Industrialists, Workers, Development Agents and Traders of Haiti	2,414	0.12
Total		1,938,641	100.00
Valid votes		1,938,641	92.58
Invalid/blank votes		155,306	7.42
Total votes		2,093,947	100.00
Registered voters/turnout		3,533,430	59.26
Source: CEP, IFES (Note: 91,219 blank votes were proportionally distributed to candidates.)

=== Senate ===
Party	Votes	%	Seats
Lespwa	768,487	18.95	13
Rally of Progressive National Democrats	433,438	10.69	1
Fusion of Haitian Social Democrats	400,852	9.89	4
Fanmi Lavalas	330,413	8.15	2
Struggling People's Organization	243,047	5.99	3
Christian National Union for the Reconstruction of Haiti	174,757	4.31	2
L'Artibonite in Action	110,775	2.73	2
Democratic Alliance Party	247,361	6.10	1
Christian Movement for a New Haiti	199,711	4.93	0
Mobilization for Haitian Progress	149,282	3.68	0
Justice for Peace and National Development	134,437	3.32	0
Tèt Ansanm	97,050	2.39	0
National Reconstruction Front	94,600	2.33	0
Broad Centre Right Front	84,327	2.08	0
Independent Movement for National Reconciliation	74,895	1.85	1
Pont	45,407	1.12	1
Other parties	465,493	11.48	0
Total	4,054,332	100.00	30
Source: E-polityka, Conseil Électoral Provisoire

=== Chamber of Deputies ===
Party	Votes	%	Seats
Lespwa	341,542	19.25	21
Fusion of Haitian Social Democrats	163,227	9.20	17
Struggling People's Organization	142,318	8.02	9
Democratic Alliance Party	136,148	7.67	12
Rally of Progressive National Democrats	119,731	6.75	4
Christian National Union for the Reconstruction of Haiti	112,772	6.36	7
Fanmi Lavalas	77,063	4.34	6
Mobilization for Haitian Progress	57,407	3.24	4
L'Artibonite in Action	52,618	2.97	5
Cooperative Action to Build Haiti	51,176	2.88	3
Tèt Ansanm	41,686	2.35	1
Justice for Peace and National Development	40,125	2.26	1
National Reconstruction Front	36,828	2.08	2
National Reconstruction Movement	36,687	2.07	1
Independent Movement for National Reconciliation	35,265	1.99	1
Christian Movement for a New Haiti	33,970	1.91	2
Haitian Democratic and Reformist Movement	29,327	1.65	1
Union of Nationalist and Progressive Haitians	9,128	0.51	1
Other parties	257,154	14.49	0
Vacant			1
Total	1,774,172	100.00	99
Registered voters/turnout	3,533,430	–	
Source: IFES

== Allegations of vote manipulation ==
Although Preval's vote count was initially over 60% of the total—in an election marred by declarations of invalid votes, allegations of fraud, errors and the discovery of perhaps thousands of ballots dumped and burned in Port-au-Prince—election officials of the interim government ordered a halt to the publication of full election results pending an inquiry into possible electoral fraud.

As the provisional electoral council announced that Preval's vote count had slipped below the 50% required to avoid a second round of voting, thousands of his supporters marched through Port-au-Prince in protest at what they claimed was an effort to manipulate the vote count and suppress support for Preval. At least two of the nine electoral council members, Pierre Richard Duchemin and Patrick Fequiere, have also alleged that the vote tabulation was being manipulated.

Of the 2.2 million ballots cast, roughly 125,000 were declared invalid. A further 4% of the ballots were blank but were nonetheless added to the count, thereby lowering the percentage of the vote a candidate receives.

During the protests, at least one man was killed and many others wounded during clashes between U.N. forces and Preval supporters. Witnesses claimed that Jordanian soldiers, who are serving as part of MINUSTAH, shot at the protesters. U.N. spokesman David Wimhurst at first denied that the U.N. soldiers had fired any shots, but then later said that the soldiers fired two "warning shots" into the air.

Talking publicly for the first time since the voting took place, Preval said "We are convinced there was massive fraud and gross errors that affected the process,". Soon after, many hundreds (possibly thousands) of charred ballots were found in a Port-au-Prince garbage dump.

On February 14, 2006, the interim government ordered a halt to the publication of full election results pending an inquiry into the alleged electoral fraud.
