= Convention for Democratic Unity =

Political party in Haiti

Convention for Democratic Unity Konvansyon Inite Demokratik
- Abbreviation: KID
- Leader: Evans Paul
- Founded: 1986
- Ideology: Populism
- Slogan: Chwal batay pèp la ("The people's warhorse")

The Convention for Democratic Unity (Haitian Creole: Konvansyon Inite Demokratik, KID) is a populist political party in Haiti. It originated as a political pressure group founded in 1986, and became a political party in 1995. Several party members have been elected to both chambers of the National Assembly, and a few have served in the Cabinet. The party's longtime leader Evans Paul served as prime minister of Haiti from 2015 to 2016, and was mayor of Port-au-Prince before that.

Haiti's main election body, the Provisional Electoral Council, alleged that KID interfered with the voting process in the department of Artibonite during the 2015–16 general election.

== History ==
The party, known by its Haitian Creole acronym "KID", was founded in 1986 as a political pressure group named the Committee for Democratic Unity (Komite Inite Demokratik). It was renamed the Confederation for Democratic Unity (Konfederasyon Inite Demokratik) the following year before transforming into a political party in 1995, renaming once again to the Convention for Democratic Unity. The party has kept its Haitian Creole shorthand (i.e. KID) throughout its history.

In the run-up to the 2006 general election, KID and the People's Party for Haiti's Rebirth formed a centre-left electoral alliance, the Democratic Alliance or Alyans for short. KID's leader Evans Paul headed the alliance and was its presidential candidate in the election. Twelve Alyans candidates were elected to the Chamber of Deputies and one to the Senate. The elected Alyans senator Maguy Durcé was given a cabinet position and Alyans was consulted by the governing Lespwa party on some policy matters in the years following the election.

In early 2007, a group of KID and Alyans members publicly expressed their disapproval of Paul's leadership and called for his resignation. André Michel, KID and Alyans's spokesperson, was suspended after he argued the party should be "renewed" because Paul had by then been leader of KID for over two decades.

After the 2015–16 general election, KID emerged with seven seats in the Chamber of Deputies and two seats in the Senate. The Provisional Electoral Council, Haiti's main election body, accused KID of election-day disruptions in the department of Artibonite and issued a severe reprimand to the party.

== Leader and ideology ==
The party's longtime leader Evans Paul served as Haiti's prime minister under president Michel Martelly and interim president Jocelerme Privert, from 16 January 2015 to 26 February 2016. He was also the mayor of the nation's capital, Port-au-Prince. Paul was originally a supporter of president Jean-Bertrand Aristide and his Fanmi Lavalas party, but Paul later became a significant figure in the opposition movement against Aristide. Paul nonetheless retained some positions held by Aristide, but Fanmi Lavalas supporters regard Paul as a "traitor".

The Haitian daily newspaper Le Nouvelliste describes KID as a populist party, while the International Crisis Group notes that some segments of the Haitian elite regard Paul as "a potential populist in the Aristide mode".
