= Coalition of Progressive Parliamentarians =

Political alliance in Haiti

The Coalition of Progressive Parliamentarians (French: Concertation des Parlementaires Progressistes, CPP) is a political alliance in the National Assembly of Haiti, primarily in the lower house. It currently consists of 53 out of 99 sitting deputies, and is the largest bloc in the legislature (compared to the Union of Parliamentarians for National Development, Fusion of Haitian Social Democrats and the OPL/Konba alliance, all of which together have only 45 out of 99 deputies).

It is best known as the bloc which pushed for a successful vote of no confidence against prime minister Jacques-Édouard Alexis and soon after rejected two of President René Préval's nominations for Alexis' replacement in 2008.

The CPP is headed by François Lucas Sainvil of Lespwa and has been characterized as leftist, populistic and anti-neoliberal in the press. The coalition especially criticizes Haiti's relationship with international organizations such as the International Monetary Fund and the World Bank.
