= Tèt Ansanm =

Political party in Haiti

Tèt Ansanm (Heads Together) is a political party in Haiti. Its leader is Dumarsais Siméus. The party participated in the 7 February 2006 Senate elections with 2.4% of the popular vote and no Senators. In the 7 February and 21 April 2006 Chamber of Deputies elections, the party won no seats.
