= Jacques-Édouard Alexis =

9th and 13th Prime Minister of Haiti

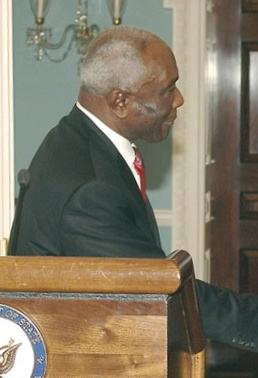

9th and 13th Prime Minister of Haiti
- In office 9 June 2006 – 5 September 2008
- President: René Préval
- Preceded by: Gérard Latortue
- Succeeded by: Michèle Pierre-Louis
- In office 26 March 1999 – 2 March 2001
- President: René Préval; Jean-Bertrand Aristide
- Preceded by: Rosny Smarth (in 1997)
- Succeeded by: Jean Marie Chérestal

Personal details
- Born: 21 September 1947 (age 79) Gonaïves, Haiti

Jacques-Édouard Alexis (French pronunciation: [ʒak edwaʁ alɛksi]; born 21 September 1947) is a Haitian politician. He served as the prime minister of Haiti from 1999 to 2001 and was prime minister for a second term from 2006 to 2008 when he was dismissed due to political fallout from food riots.

== Early life and career ==
Alexis was born in Gonaïves, Haiti on 21 September 1947. He is the great-great grandson of President Pierre Nord Alexis and Princess Marie-Louise-Amelie-Celestina Pierrot, a daughter of Prince Jean-Louis Pierrot. He attended school at Lycée Geffrard in Gonaïves (1959–1964) and later Lycée Toussaint Louverture in Port-au-Prince (1964–1966). He received a degree in agricultural engineering from the State University of Haiti in 1973.

After graduation, Alexis held a series of jobs in academia. He was an assistant professor of chemistry at the State University of Haiti from 1973 to 1976 and a teaching and research assistant at Université Laval, Quebec, Canada, from 1977 to 1978, earning his Master of Science degree in food science and technology from Université Laval in 1979. He was then a professor of food technology and post-harvest technology at the State University of Haiti (1979–1987), a professor of post-harvest technology and human nutrition at Ecole Moyenne d’Agriculture (1979–1985), and Dean of the Faculty of Agronomy and Veterinary Medicine at the State University of Haiti (1985–1987). Between 1987 and 1990, he coordinated the founding of Quisqueya University, where he served as the school's first rector from 1990 to 1995.

Under President René Préval, Alexis served in the government as the Minister of National Education, Youth, and Sport (1996–1999), Minister of Culture (1997–1999), and Minister of the Interior and Territorial Communities (1999–2000).

== As prime minister ==
=== First term ===
Alexis was nominated as prime minister by Préval on 16 July 1998, following congressional rejections of three prior nominees that had resulted in a year-long political crisis. His nomination was preliminarily ratified by the Senate on 17 December and by the Chamber of Deputies on 17 December despite an unfavorable report regarding his management of funds as Minister of Education. Completion of the ratification process requires ratification of the nominee's proposed cabinet and general policy; Alexis's final ratification was delayed by the insistence of opposition leaders that they receive cabinet posts. Parliament passed a bill extending their term so that they could continue the ratification process, but Préval denied that they had authority to do so, announcing on 11 January (the final day of the parliamentary session) that he intended to bypass Parliament and form a government by decree. Opposition parties accused Préval of having staged a bloodless coup and considered Alexis an illegitimate prime minister. Alexis served as prime minister from 26 March 1999 to 7 February 2001.

=== Second term ===
Préval was re-elected in February 2006, and he again nominated Alexis as prime minister on 17 May 2006, three days after taking office as president. The nomination was ratified almost unanimously by both houses of parliament, and Alexis and his government were sworn in on 9 June 2006. His second government consisted of a coalition of six parties, including Préval's Lespwa party, the Fusion of Haitian Social Democrats, the Struggling People's Organization, and Jean-Bertrand Aristide's Fanmi Lavalas party. His stated policy objectives included the restoration of security in the country and the provision of basic services to citizens.

==== Resignation ====
Criticism of Alexis's economic policies led to a no-confidence vote in February 2008, which Alexis survived. Riots broke out in early April 2008 regarding high food prices, and Alexis announced an investment program designed to lower the cost of living. On 10 April, it was announced that 16 Senators (a majority, as there are 30 seats in Haiti's Senate) had signed a letter advising Alexis to resign within two days. The letter described Alexis's proposals to resolve the economic crisis as "too little, too late" and said that "it is obvious that the majority of the people don't believe any more in the capacity of your government to take courageous measures to ease the misery that the population is facing daily." The Senate then voted unanimously to dismiss Alexis on 12 April, with all of the 16 Senators present in favor. Préval said that he would consult with Parliament to choose a new prime minister, but he also said that Alexis had done his best and should not receive all the blame for the situation.

== Personal life ==
Alexis is married and has five children.

Political offices
Preceded by Rosny Smarth	Prime Minister of Haiti; 1999–2001	Succeeded by Jean Marie Chérestal
Preceded by Gérard Latortue	Prime Minister of Haiti; 2006–2008	Succeeded by Michele Pierre-Louis
