= Gary Guiteau =

Haitian politician

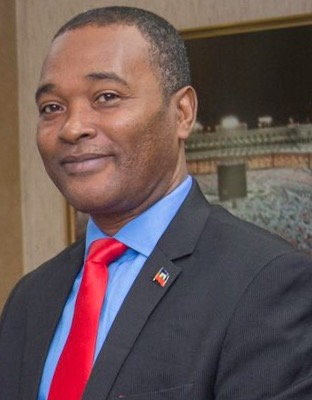
Gary Guiteau

Gary Guiteau is a Haitian politician from Lascahobas, Centre, and the leader of the Federalist Party.

== Early life and education ==
Guiteau was born in Lascahobas on May 10, 1963. He studied legal science at the Faculty of Law in Port-au-Prince, then went on to study science of religion, law, and theology at the Université de Montréal. He then got a degree in International Law and International Policy at UQAM.

== Career ==
Prior to the split between Fanmi Lavalas and the Organisation du Peuple en Lutte, Guiteau was a Deputy for Lascahobas for Lavalas, supporting Jean-Bertrand Aristide during his exile and opposing amnesty for members of the FRAPH coup government.

After the split between FL and the OPL, Guiteau joined the OPL, representing Lascahobas in the Chamber of Deputies, elected in the 1995 elections.

In 2000, Guiteau was an OPL candidate for the Senate in Centre, winning just over 18,000 votes and 15% of the vote, with all the Fanmi Lavalas candidates claiming victory in the first round.
