= Dumarsais Simeus =

Haitian-born and U.S. naturalized businessman

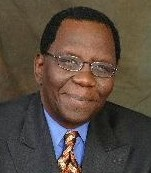
- Dumarsais Mécène Siméus Photo VOA News

Candidate for President of Haiti
- Election date 2006

Dumarsais Mécène Siméus (also Dumas Siméus; born 1939) is a Haitian-born and U.S. naturalized businessman from Texas. Simeus returned to Haiti to be a candidate in the 2006 presidential elections.

== Early life ==
Siméus was born in Pont-Sondé in Haiti's Artibonite Valley, the son of peasant rice farmers who never had a chance to get a school education. He grew up helping his parents work the land in Haiti to feed himself and his 11 siblings. In 1961, his family sold some land so he could fly to the United States to pursue a college education at Florida A&M University. Siméus transferred to Howard University in Washington, DC, where he earned a degree in electrical engineering.

In 1970, he became a US citizen. In 1972, he earned an MBA from the University of Chicago Graduate School of Business.

== Career ==
He worked his way up the corporate ladder. He was a financial analyst at Rockwell International and KB Home, a director of Latin American operations for Bendix, general manager of Hartz Pet Food, France, and vice president of international business development at Atari.

He quickly rose in the corporate world, becoming president of Beatrice Foods, Latin America, and eventually president and chief operating officer of TLC Beatrice International Foods.

In 1984, Siméus started working for TLC Beatrice International Holdings Inc., the $2.1 billion, black-owned food processing and distribution company. He served as president and CEO for two years before leaving in 1992 to buy and run his own business.

In 1996, with $55 million financing, Siméus bought Portion-Trol Foods from Flagstar Corp in Mansfield, Texas, and renamed it Siméus Foods International Inc. Siméus Foods, based south of Fort Worth, manufactures value-added food products for national multichain restaurants and large institutions such as El Pollo Loco, Denny's, T.G.I. Friday's, and Burger King in the United States and Canada. Siméus Foods Intl. now generates $155 million a year.

In 1999, Siméus established Org. Sové Lavi www.sovelavi.org, a nonprofit foundation to provide medical care, education, and clothing to Haitians.

Between October 2004 and February 2005, he served on Florida Governor Jeb Bush's advisory board for Haiti. The group made a series of recommendations for Haïti's security, economic development, and disaster preparedness.

A group of about 40 U.S.-based Haitian business and civic leaders has urged him to run for president.

== Run for Haitian presidency ==
After months of speculation, Siméus decided to contest the Haitian presidency in August 2005. Siméus' political platform includes making it easier for companies to invest in Haiti, promoting jobs, and rooting out corruption by making government accountable. Siméus said, "I want to create a Haiti where people are proud to stay because there are opportunities." ..."I want a Haiti where there is access to capital for the average guy, for the poor guy who was born in a hut like I was born in." During his campaign, he ran into a few challenges.

His status as a dual citizen became a challenge. Siméus said that he still has Haitian citizenship, despite taking the US oath of allegiance. The Haitian Electoral Board disagreed. Eventually, this matter was taken to the Supreme Court of Haiti, which recently ruled that Siméus could place his name on the ballot, but he still faces election council challenges to his candidacy and a threat of prosecution alleging false candidacy claims on election papers. Article 135 states a presidential candidate must "be a native-born Haitian and never have renounced Haitian nationality" and have resided in the country for five consecutive years before the election.

Another challenge is his public acceptance. Siméus was essentially unknown in Haiti prior to 2004 and many viewed him as an outsider. At a campaign rally, he was cordially received in Solino, a crumbling and crime-plagued neighborhood of the Haitian capital Port-au-Prince, but when his tour reached the Bel Air neighborhood, a stronghold for supporters of ex-president Aristide, dozens of angry men and women rushed onto the streets, hurling rocks and chunks of concrete at Siméus' car, forcing him to flee.

On September 27, U.S. Secretary of State Condoleezza Rice, on a 6-hour visit to Haiti, publicly and pointedly called on Haiti's interim government to hold "inclusive" elections. Rice reportedly pressed Prime Minister Gérard Latortue for Siméus to be readmitted to the race. On October 11, the Supreme Court ruled in Siméus’ favor, ordering the CEP to put the Texan back on the ballot. A day after the ruling, half of the members of the Supreme Court were forced into retirement by the orders of Gerard Latortue, and his justice minister.

=== Family ===
Siméus is married and a father of three. He has brought 40 relatives to the United States, but his parents remain in Haiti.

== See also ==
- Haiti
- 2006 Haitian elections
- Constitution of Haiti
