= Mobilization for Haitian Progress =

The Mobilization for Haitian Progress (Mobilisation pour le Progrès Haïtien) is a political party in Haiti. The party won 3.7% of the popular vote and no Senators in the 7 February 2006 Senate elections.

In the 7 February and 21 April 2006 Chamber of Deputies elections, the party won 3 out of 99 seats.
