= 1997 Haitian parliamentary election =

Parliamentary elections were held in Haiti on 6 April 1997 for one-third of the seats in the Senate and two seats in the Chamber of Deputies. A total of 45 candidates from 15 parties (including 25 independents) contested the Senate elections.

Only two candidates were elected in the first round, which was marked by a very low turnout. The second round was indefinitely postponed by the Provisional Electoral Council on 21 May due to international pressure from the Organisation of American States and threats of a boycott by the ruling Fanmi Lavalas, which claimed there had been fraud in the first round.
