= Cooperative Action to Build Haiti =

Political party in Haiti

The Cooperative Action to Build Haiti (KONBA, aka "Working Together to Build Haiti", Haitian Creole: Konbit pou Bati Ayiti / French: Coumbite pour Reconstruire Haïti) is a political party in Haiti. The party was formerly led by Evans Lescouflair, followed by Carlo Clement and then Jean Williams Jeanty as secretary-general.

In the 2006 elections for the Chamber of Deputies, the party won three out of the ninety-nine seats. In the 2009 special elections, KONBA won one seat in the Chamber of Deputies, and the Senate seat for Nippes. During the 48th parliamentary term, the representatives of KONBA in the Chamber of Deputies formed an alliance with the OPL bloc, and as a result, Lescouflair received the post as Minister of Youth, Sport, and Civil Action in the Alexis, Pierre-Louis and Bellerive governments.
