= Bonivert Claude =

Haitian politician (born 1945)

Bonivert Claude (born February 2, 1945, in Torbeck, Les Cayes, Haiti) is a former governor of the Banque de la République d'Haïti and a presidential candidate in the 2000 and 2006 Haitian elections.

== Biography ==
=== Education ===
In July 1966, Claude received a diploma in accounting after passing (summa cum laude) the State Examination. In July 1967, he graduated summa cum laude from the Faculty of Law and Economics of the State University of Haiti. In 1971 and 1972, he performed advanced study in macroeconomics, public finance and financial programming at the International Monetary Fund in Washington, DC. Claude received professional training at the Federal Reserve Bank of New York, the Federal Reserve System at Washington DC and the Central Bank of Mexico.

=== Career ===
From 1975 to 1986 Claude participated in various seminars and meeting of technicians of Central banks. Claude was hired by the National Bank of the Republic of Haiti (BNRH) in January 1966, as the Laureate at an entrance examination organized in December 1965. He made a career at the Department of Statistics and Economic Studies. In August 1979 the BNRH was split up into two banks, the “Banque Nationale de Crédit” (BNC), a commercial bank and the “Banque de la République d’Haïti” (BRH), the Central Bank. Claude served as the Deputy Director then the Director of the Direction of Economic studies of the Central Bank. He also served as the Secretary of the board before being promoted as a member of the board.

During his long career, Claude has been delegated by the Central Bank as technical Assistant to various ministries such as the Ministry of Finance, the Ministry of Interior, the Ministry of Planning and other State organisms such as the National Port Authority (APN) and the State Telephone Company (Teleco). During his tenure as Governor of the Central Bank, Claude also served as: President of the Board of TELECO, and Governor of the International Monetary Fund for Haiti. In early 1994, at the Canary Islands, Claude was elected for a term of one year as President of the Conference of Central Banks of Latin America and Africa. In 1993, Claude requested the assistance of the Center for Latin American Monetary Studies (CEMLA) and created the Central Bank Institute (IFBC).

=== Governor of the Bank of the Republic of Haiti ===
Claude took office at the end of November 1991, after winning Senate approval for a three-year term as the helm of the Bank of the Republic of Haiti, (the BRH). Claude had already served as member of the Board of the Central Bank from June 1985 to March 1986 and from February 1982 to December 1982. Claude was governor until October 1994.

=== Presidential candidate ===
Claude also registered to run for president in the 2000 elections, where Jean-Bertrand Aristide won in a controversial race. But this decried election was boycotted by most political parties. Mr. Claude was named by the Renovated Social Party (PSR) to run for President of Haïti in the presidential race whose first round was scheduled for November 20, 2005.

== Contributions ==
In 1974, Claude created the “Ecole de Formation des Cadres Techniques et Commerciaux” (EFCTEC) a private educational complex with a commercial school, a technical school, a computer school, an elementary school and a high school. Claude served as Treasurer of the Board of the Certified Public Accountant organization (OCPAH). He also served as a Member of the Public Relation Commission of the Association of the Private Schools of Port-au-Prince.

Claude was chosen by the South Florida Sun Sentinel to illustrate its heading: Economics, in its edition of January 4, 2004 commemorating the Haiti Bicentennial. The Miami Business Magazine (now, South Florida CEO) called Claude: the "Alan Greenspan of Haïti" in its edition of November–December 2000, vol 3 No 8.
