= National Reconstruction Front =

The National Reconstruction Front (Front pour la Reconstruction Nationale, FRN) is a political party in Haiti. It was founded by Guy Philippe, a former police officer who had led the 2004 Haitian coup d'état against president Jean-Bertrand Aristide. The party won two Chamber of Deputies seats in the 2006 Haitian general election.
