= Dany Toussaint =

Haitian politician (1957–2021)

Dany Toussaint (12 September 1957 – 15 September 2021) was a Haitian politician who was a candidate in the country's February 2006 presidential election. Toussaint served as Haitian Army major, head of Haitian police and bodyguard of Jean-Bertrand Aristide. He was a Senator and leader of the Haitian Democratic and Reformist Movement Party.

== Investigation ==
In 2003, Judge Claudy Gassant requested that Toussaint's immunity from prosecution be lifted in regards to the assassination of Haitian journalist Jean Dominique who had accused Toussaint of having his rival for the position of Secretary of State for Public Security, Jean Lamy, assassinated. The request of Judge Gassant was rejected by the senate.

== Arrest ==
On 2 January 2006, MINUSTAH troops arrested Toussaint for possession of illegal weapons. He was handed over to the Haitian National Police, who released him hours later.

== Death ==
Toussaint died on 15 September 2021.
