= COPPPAL =

International organization of political parties in Latin America and the Caribbean

Permanent Conference of Political Parties of Latin America and the Caribbean COPPPAL: Conferencia Permanente de Partidos Políticos de América Latina y el Caribe; Conférence permanente des partis politiques d'Amérique latine et des Caraïbes
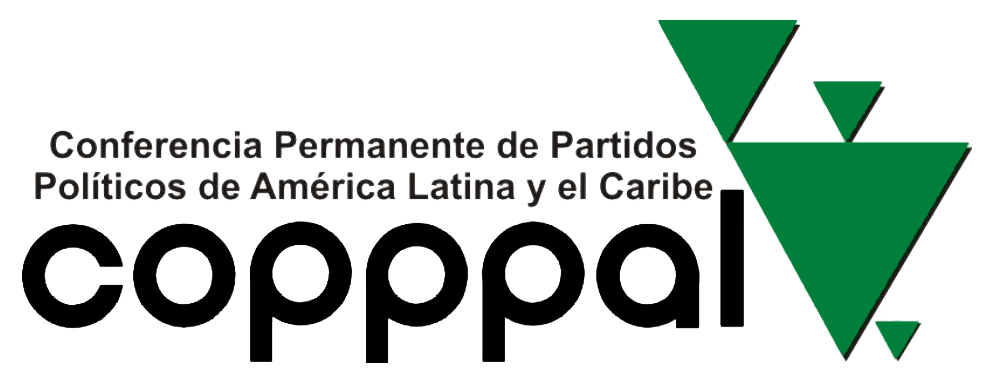
- President: Alejandro Moreno Cárdenas, Mexico
- Vice President: Alberto Aguilar Iñárritu, Mexico
- Founded: 12 October 1979
- Ideology: Big tent Factions: Liberalism; Social democracy Christian left Socialism of the 21st century
- Political position: Centre to left-wing

Website
- www.copppal.org

The Permanent Conference of Political Parties of Latin America and the Caribbean (French: Conférence permanente des partis politiques d'Amérique latine et des Caraïbes; Spanish: Conferencia Permanente de Partidos Políticos de América Latina y el Caribe, COPPPAL) is an international organization of political parties in Latin America and the Caribbean. It was created at the behest of the Institutional Revolutionary Party on 12 October 1979 in Oaxaca, Mexico, and brings together liberal, social democratic, Christian democratic, and other leftist political parties. Its first president (1979–1981) was Gustavo Carvajal Moreno of Mexico (PRI). Its current president is the Mexican politician Alejandro Moreno Cárdenas (PRI).

COPPPAL was established during a 12 October 1979 conference in Oaxaca, Mexico, on the initiative of the Partido Revolucionario Institucional (PRI), the ruling party in Mexico at the time. The multilateral non-governmental organization was defined by its charter as a "forum of nationalist parties that prioritize sovereignty, while advancing a more just and egalitarian international order."

The organization would advance this goal by:

defending democracy and the legal and political institutions while fostering their development and improvement; strengthening the principle of self-determination of the peoples of Latin America; promoting regional integration; supporting any initiative for disarmament; promoting the defense, sovereignty and better utilization of the natural resources of each country in the region; boosting development; promoting Latin American regional organizations and joint actions that will enable the establishment of a more just international economic order; defending and promoting respect for human rights.

The organization was led by the PRI between its establishment in 1979 and 1984, and again between 1989 and 2005. Antonio Cafiero of the Justicialist Party (Argentina) was elected president of the coordinating committee in 2005, and Gustavo Carvajal Moreno of the PRI (Mexico) was elected as its adjunct president. Cafiero was succeeded in 2011 by Pedro Joaquín Coldwell of the PRI. The committee coordinates youth exchange, consultative, and other activities among its member parties, as well as with the International Conference of Asian Political Parties (ICAPP).

== Membership ==
The following political parties from the Americas are represented at COPPPAL (associate members in italics):

Nation	Member Parties
Argentina	Broad Front – Intransigent Party – Justicialist Party – Radical Civic Union – Socialist Party
Aruba	People's Electoral Movement
Belize	People's United Party
Bolivia	Free Bolivia Movement – Revolutionary Left Movement – Revolutionary Nationalist Movement
Bonaire	Bonaire Democratic Party
Brazil	Brazilian Democratic Movement – Democratic Labour Party – Workers' Party
Canada	Parti Québécois
Chile	Party for Democracy – Socialist Party of Chile
Colombia	Colombian Liberal Party
Costa Rica	National Liberation Party
Cuba	Communist Party of Cuba
Curaçao	People's Crusade Labour Party – Workers' Liberation Front
Dominica	Dominica Labour Party
Dominican Republic	Dominican Liberation Party – Dominican Revolutionary Party – Revolutionary Social Democratic Party
Ecuador	Democratic Left – Ecuadorian Roldosist Party – Socialist Party – Broad Front of Ecuador
El Salvador	Democratic Change – Farabundo Martí National Liberation Front
Guatemala	National Unity of Hope
Haiti	Fusion of Haitian Social Democrats – Struggling People's Organization
Honduras	Liberal Party of Honduras
Jamaica	People's National Party
Mexico	Citizens' Movement – Institutional Revolutionary Party – Labor Party – Party of the Democratic Revolution
Nicaragua	Sandinista National Liberation Front
Panama	Democratic Revolutionary Party
Peru	American Revolutionary People's Alliance – Peruvian Nationalist Party
Puerto Rico	Puerto Rican Independence Party
Saint Lucia	Saint Lucia Labour Party
Saint Vincent and the Grenadines	Unity Labour Party
United States	Social Democrats of America
Uruguay	Broad Front – Colorado Party – National Party
Venezuela	For Social Democracy – Democratic Action – Movement for Socialism – People's Electoral Movement – United Socialist Party of Venezuela

== See also ==
- International Conference of Asian Political Parties
