= Party for the Integral Advancement of the Haitian People =

The Party for the Integral Advancement of the Haitian People (Parti Pour l'Avancement Integral du Peuple Haïtien, or PAIPH) is a political party in Haiti founded by Colette Jacques in 1990. Jacques was the first woman to have a political party registered and recognized in the country. The PAIPH platform focuses on education, and the party was created to improve Haiti's international image. The PAIPH logo is a green heart on a white canvas, representing a heart of hope for the innocent Haitian.

== Background of Colette Jacques ==
Jacques was born in Port-au-Prince. She was very active in school, as well as caring for four brothers and supervising her parents' business. She attended College Bird with JN Claude Duvalier ("Baby Doc"), but her parents feared that she would get involved in politics and transferred her to the SDA college in Diquini. She later attended Lycee Toussaint Louverture College where she created the first drill team for her school. Jacques was chosen by the Department of Education to sing for the presidential inauguration of "Baby Doc," the only girl among five chosen students. Her drill team later conducted Francois Duvalier ("Papa Doc") to the cemetery in 1971. Though she had intended to study medicine, Jacques left school and worked as private secretary to the Director of the Main Post Office, as well as Assistant Accountant to the President of the SDA Franco-Hatien Union at the Adventist College. She also volunteered at the SDA Clinic in Dinquini, working to help cure tuberculosis. She went to Canada in 1975 to canvas and then studied legal secretarial work in Montreal, graduating in 1977. Jacques then studied nursing at Adventist University in Tennessee and worked on the ship USS Samuel Gumpers stationed in San Diego for the US Navy. Jacques also worked for Kaiser Permanente.

In 1987 Jacques founded SOAP (Support Organization for AIDS Prevention Inc). With SOAP, Jacques became the first black woman to educate the Caribbean on AIDS. Jacques then worked as the National Project Director for the Centers for Disease Control (CDC) representing California, New York State, Florida and Connecticut. In April 1990 Jacques organized a march against the Food and Drug Administration (FDA) after becoming frustrated with discrimination against Haitian refugees and AIDS patients.

Jacques was the first woman ever to demonstrate how to properly use a condom on Haitian national Television. Her nickname "Mme Kapot"("Mrs Condom") encouraged Haitians to use the formerly taboo word, condom, in public. Jacques's presentation before an FDA panel on April 20, 1990, influenced the decision to remove Haiti from a list of AIDS carriers in August.

== Founding of PAIPH ==
Jacques became involved in politics to improve the Haitian image worldwide. She founded PAIPH in September 1990 and was the only female among 26 candidates in the 1990 Haitian elections with the slogan "I am the heart of Hope for all Haitians".[]. PAIPH's platform was focused on equal rights and education. Ertha Pascale Trouillot, the election supervisor, was ordered to arrest Jacques on her way from Radio Haiti where she was recording AIDS education PSAs. Jacques was arrested and removed from the ballot. She contested this action but was denied an audience. In December Jacques returned to California to read, approve, and sign the FDA resolution to remove Haiti from the list of AIDS carriers.

PAIPH goals include better schools, improved agriculture, better construction of buildings and roads, and an improved health system.
