= Florence Duperval Guillaume =

Haitian politician

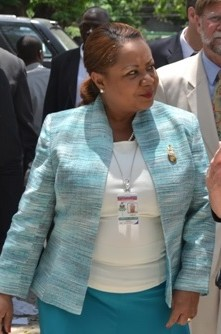
- Guillaume in 2012

Prime Minister of Haiti Acting
- In office 20 December 2014 – 16 January 2015
- President: Michel Martelly
- Preceded by: Laurent Lamothe
- Succeeded by: Evans Paul

Personal details
- Born: Port-au-Prince, Haiti
- Political party: Independent

Florence Duperval Guillaume (French pronunciation: [flɔʁɑ̃s dypɛʁval ɡijom]) is a Haitian politician who was Haiti's Minister of Public Health and Population She was acting Prime Minister of Haiti from 20 December 2014 to 16 January 2015.

Political offices
Preceded by Laurent Lamothe	Prime Minister of Haiti; Acting; 2014–2015	Succeeded by Evans Paul
