= Guy Philippe =

Haitian politician and drug smuggler

- Philippe in 2015.

Personal details
- Born: February 29, 1968 (age 58) Pestel, Haiti
- Party: Revolutionary Force of National Accord (2024–present)
- Known for: Coup leader, presidential candidate

Guy Philippe (French pronunciation: [ɡi filip]; born 29 February 1968) is a Haitian former police officer, politician, and convicted money launderer, who led the 2004 Haitian coup d'état against president Jean-Bertrand Aristide after being fired from the police in 2000.

He originally gained power in Haiti as a paramilitary leader, and had participated in the electoral process to become a political leader. He led the 2000–2004 paramilitary insurgency that culminated in the 2004 Haitian coup d'état ousting Haiti's elected government and President Jean-Bertrand Aristide. Philippe was a presidential candidate in the 2006 Haitian general election, receiving nearly 2% of the vote.

Philippe served time in U.S. federal prison from 2017 to 2023: On 21 June 2017, the United States, where he had spent some of the illegal proceeds, sentenced him to nine years in federal prison, in connection with money he received for ensuring police protection of drug trafficking during the late 1990s and early 2000s. The charges did not address any of the numerous deaths that were documented as being carried out by death squads that he led between 2000 and 2004. In 2023, Philippe was repatriated from U.S. federal prison to Haiti.

== Early life ==
Philippe was born in Pestel, in the province of Grand'Anse. He obtained his primary and secondary education at Institution Saint-Louis de Gonzague. Human Rights watch alleges that in his late teens he was a death squad leader during the rebellion against Baby Doc Duvalier and in the turmoil which followed.

According to Philippe, he "has a law degree from Ecuador and "studied medicine in Mexico for a year." In 1992, he received a scholarship from the Haitian Armed Forces (FAd'H) to Ecuador's police academy (La Escuela Superior de Policía "Gral. Alberto Enríquez Gallo"), where he graduated in 1995. Part of his training during this time was with US Special Forces. When he returned to Haiti, the FAd'H had been dismantled. He was assigned to the newly created police force, which is why he was never formally part of the Haitian army.

== Career ==
Philippe accepted a commission as a commander in the Haitian National Police, and then became the police chief of the Port-au-Prince suburb of Delmas from 1997 to 1999. International monitors later "learned that dozens of suspected gang members were summarily executed, mainly by police under the command of Inspector Berthony Bazile, Philippe's deputy." In 1999 he was made police chief of Cap-Haïtien.

=== 2000s: Coup d'etat and political beginnings ===
On 15 January 2000, Guy Philippe and his wife had a daughter named Aïsha. Following October 2000 accusations of participation in a coup plot and his subsequent removal from his post as police chief of Cap-Haïtien, Philippe fled to the Dominican Republic. While there he recruited ex-military and others forming a paramilitary organization, which was alleged to have received training from the U.S. Government.

The Haitian government accused Philippe of masterminding a deadly attack on the Police Academy in July 2001 and of an attempted coup in December 2001. In July 2003, witnesses place him, together with Voltaire Jean-Batiste, leading a death squad operating in eastern Haiti just across the Dominican border.

In February 2004, he returned from the Dominican Republic with his paramilitary group to join the 2004 Haitian coup d'état against president Jean-Bertrand Aristide. Five days after crossing back into Haiti and joining former militia leader Louis-Jodel Chamblain in announcing his support for anti-government forces, Philippe was given command of the rebel army.

On 2 March 2004, Philippe and his paramilitaries retook control of the former Haitian Army headquarters across from the National Palace. Philippe declared to the international press that he was now in control of 90% of Haiti's armed forces. In an address on Haitian Radio, Philippe declared, "The country is in my hands." He summoned twenty police commanders to meet with him the previous day and warned that if they failed to appear he would arrest them.

That same day, Philippe announced he would arrest Haitian Prime Minister Yvon Neptune, who is a top official of Aristide's Lavalas party. As published at the time by Democracy Now!, quoting sources in Haiti: "Neptune's home was burned and looted and that he was being pursued by armed gangs. People close to Neptune reported that he fears for his life. Local radio reported that Neptune was evacuated from his office by helicopter as Guy Philippe led a mob in a march to the office. Meanwhile, there are reports of regular execution-style killings on the Haitian seaside.".

Early in 2005, Philippe's guerrilla group, the Front for National Reconstruction (FRN) which was involved in the coup of 2004 was officially transformed into a recognized political party. On 11 July 2005, Guy Philippe announced he would run for president for the FRN party. Philippe has been critical of the administration of the interim government, blaming them for the slow process of setting up registration centers throughout Haiti. Early on he was considered a front runner for the 2006 Haitian general election but later fell behind the main contenders simply because he did not have the money required for a campaign. In spite of his international and local rebel backers and appealing to young Haitians to follow him, Philippe won less than 1% of the vote, demonstrating that he had failed to project his persona as a popular hero.

=== 2010s: Drug smuggling and legal trouble ===
Shortly after dawn on 16 July 2007, five helicopters, two planes and more than a dozen heavily armed DEA and Haitian anti-drug agents surrounded Philippe's home in the hills above Les Cayes, on Haiti's remote southern peninsula, to seize evidence of drug trafficking. Philippe was suspected of ties to illegal drug trafficking in Haiti. Philippe's supporters said the allegations against him were politically motivated, noting he had recently threatened to identify powerful Haitians who provided financial support for the 2004 coup d'état.

Philippe was indicted in the United States on charges of conspiracy to import cocaine and money laundering. Following his indictment, Philippe isolated himself in his hometown of Pestel, protected by his paramilitaries.

In 2015, Philippe began his campaign for Senator in the Haitian parliament, as a member of the National Consortium of Haitian Political Parties (CNPPH). His paramilitary units continued a guerrilla war to "create havoc and overthrow the provisional president, Jocelerme Privert." In the final election, Philippe won the seat for Grand'Anse department, and was due to be sworn in on 9 January.

On the afternoon of 5 January 2017, Guy Philippe was arrested on these charges as he walked out of a popular radio show. He was extradited to the US on the same day as his arrest. His arrest was not without controversy as the newly elected senator had not yet been sworn in, and thus had not received the immunity from legal charges or arrest that is provided under Haitian law to protect serving lawmakers. There were questions about the legality of the extradition.

On 21 June 2017, after pleading guilty to money laundering, Philippe was given a nine-year sentence by the United States federal government (USFG) for taking bribes from drug smugglers.

=== 2020s ===
After serving his sentence, he was promptly deported back to Haiti in November 2023, and quickly re-launched his political career, vowing to fix the gang war in Haiti.

By March 2024, with the pending resignation of Ariel Henry, he was considered to be a powerful player, potentially able to negotiate with Jimmy Chérizier. By early March, he declared himself a candidate for president. In August 2024, Guy Philippe announced the formation of a new political party the Revolutionary Force of National Accord (FREN) of which he is the national coordinator. The announcement was made at a press conference by Nader Joiséus, former minister of public works and deputy national coordinator of the new party.
