= National Reconstruction Movement =

Political party (Haiti)

The National Reconstruction Movement (Mouvman pou Rekonstriksyon Nasyonal / Mouvement pour la Reconstruction Nationale) is a political party in Haiti. In the 7 February and 21 April 2006 Chamber of Deputies elections, the party won 1 out of 99 seats.
