= Democratic Alliance (Haiti) =

Electoral alliance in Haiti

Democratic Alliance Alliance Démocratique
- Abbreviation: Alyans (Haitian Creole)
- Leader: Evans Paul
- Founded: 2006
- Ideology: Populism
- Political position: Centre-left

The Democratic Alliance (French: Alliance Démocratique), commonly known by its Haitian Creole name Alyans, was an electoral alliance in Haiti between the Convention for Democratic Unity (KID) and the People's Party for Haiti's Rebirth (PPRH), formed to contest the 2006 general election. Alyans won seats in both the Chamber of Deputies and the Senate, and its elected senator served in the Cabinet. It was described as a centre-left coalition.

KID's longtime leader Evans Paul headed Alyans. He faced internal criticisms from both Alyans and KID members in the months following the 2006 election.

== History ==
In the run-up to the 2006 Haitian general election, the Convention for Democratic Unity (KID) and the People's Party for Haiti's Rebirth (PPRH) formed the Democratic Alliance to jointly contest both the presidential and legislative races. The Democratic Alliance was often referred to by its Haitian Creole name, Alyans. Alyans's electoral head and presidential candidate was Evans Paul, the longtime leader of KID.

Alyans won 12 seats in the Chamber of Deputies and 1 in the Senate in the 2006 election. Paul won 2.5% of the vote in the presidential race and was not elected. The victorious Lespwa party allocated a cabinet position to the elected Alyans senator, Maguy Durcé. Alyans was also one of the opposition parties frequently consulted by the Lespwa government. Despite this, Alyans's support for the Lespwa government varied, with Alyans taking positions in favour of some Lespwa policies and positions against others.

Paul came under the scrutiny of a group of Alyans and KID members in early 2007; they publicly disapproved of Paul's leadership and called for his resignation. André Michel, the spokesperson for both Alyans and KID, called for KID to be "renewed" after over two decades under the leadership of Paul. Michel was consequently suspended.

== Ideology ==
Analysts described Alyans as a centre-left coalition, while KID and Paul have been regarded as populist.
