= 1990–91 Haitian general election =

- 16 December 1990 to 20 January 1991
- Registered: 3,271,155
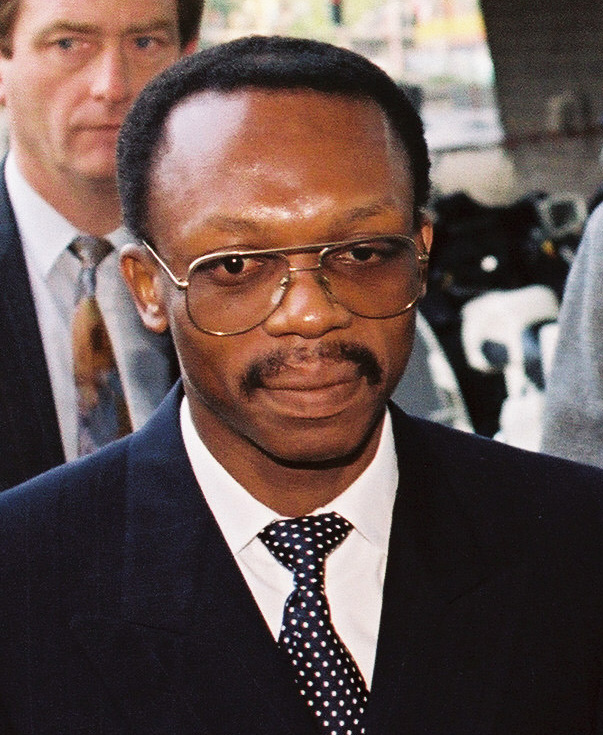

Nominee	Jean-Bertrand Aristide	Marc Bazin
Party	FNCD	ANDP
Popular vote	1,107,125	233,277
Percentage	67.48%	14.22%
- Results by department.
President before election
Ertha Pascal-Trouillot
(Interim)
Elected President
Jean-Bertrand Aristide
FNCD

General elections were held in Haiti between 16 December 1990 and 20 January 1991. The presidential election, held on 16 December, resulted in a victory for Jean-Bertrand Aristide of the National Front for Change and Democracy (FNCD). The FNCD also won the parliamentary elections for which voter turnout was 50.8%. It was widely reckoned as the first honest election held in Haiti since the country declared independence in 1804.

Aristide was sworn in on 7 February, but was deposed in a coup eight months later.

== Background ==
For the elections, the United Nations General Assembly had established the United Nations Observer Group for the Verification of the Elections in Haiti (ONUVEH), which sent election monitors, as did the Organization of American States. These organisations helped ensure that the elections were free and fair.

== Results ==
=== President ===
Candidate	Party	Votes	%
Jean-Bertrand Aristide	National Front for Change and Democracy	1,107,125	67.48
Marc Bazin	National Alliance for Democracy and Progress	233,277	14.22
Louis Déjoie Jr.	National Agricultural Industrial Party	80,057	4.88
Hubert de Ronceray	Movement for National Development	54,871	3.34
Sylvio Claude	Christian Democratic Party of Haiti	49,149	3.00
René Théodore	Unified Party of Haitian Communists	30,064	1.83
Thomas Désulmé	National Labour Party	27,362	1.67
Volvick Rémy Joseph	National Cobite Movement	21,351	1.30
François Latortue	Democratic Movement for the Liberation of Haiti	15,060	0.92
Richard Vladimir Jeanty	Paradise Party	12,296	0.75
Fritz Simon	Independent	10,117	0.62
Total		1,640,729	100.00
Registered voters/turnout		3,271,155	–
Source: Nohlen

=== Chamber of Deputies ===
Party	Votes	%	Seats
National Front for Change and Democracy			27
National Alliance for Democracy and Progress			17
Christian Democratic Party of Haiti			7
National Agricultural Industrial Party			6
Rally of Progressive National Democrats			6
Movement for National Development			5
National Cobite Movement			5
National Labour Party			3
Independents			5
Total			81
Total votes	1,640,729	–	
Registered voters/turnout	3,271,155	50.16	
Source: Nohlen, IPU

=== Senate ===
Party	Votes	%	Seats
National Front for Change and Democracy			13
National Alliance for Democracy and Progress			6
National Reconstruction Movement			2
National Agricultural Industrial Party			2
Christian Democratic Party of Haiti			1
National Labour Party			1
Rally of Progressive National Democrats			1
Independents			1
Total			27
Total votes	1,640,729	–	
Registered voters/turnout	3,271,155	50.16	
Source: Nohlen, Ameringer, IPU

The elected members were:

- Artibonite: Thomas Eddy Dupiton, Déjean Bélizaire, Serge Joseph
- Centre: Serge Gilles, Hérard Pauyo, Smith Metelus,
- Grand-Anse: Robert Opont, Bernard Sansaricq, Yvon Ghislain
- Nord: Rony Mondestin, Edrice Raymond, Raoul Remy
- Nord-Est: Firmin Jean-Louis, Judnel Jean, Amos Andre
- Nord-Ouest: Luc Fleurinord, Ebrané Cadet, Art L. Austin
- Ouest: Jacques Clarck Parent, Turneb Delpe, Wesner Emmanuel
- Sud: Julio Larosiliere, Franck Leonard, Frahner Jean-Baptiste
- Sud-Est: Guy Bauduy, Jean-Robert Martinez, Alberto Joseph
