= Rigaud Duplan =

Haitian politician

Joseph Rigaud Duplan was a 2006 candidate for president of Haiti running for the political party Plate-forme Justice pour la Paix et le Development National (JPDN). He was the most popular of the candidates in Haiti who did not advertise on TV or radio. Currently he works as an attorney in his own law office in Port-au-Prince.

He was Minister of Finance in 1994.
