= Independent Movement for National Reconciliation =

The Independent Movement for National Reconciliation (Mouvement Indépendant pour la Réconciliation Nationale, MIRN) was a political party in Haiti. In the presidential elections of 7 February 2006, its candidate Luc Fleurinord won 1.9% of the popular vote. The party won in the 7 February 2006 Senate elections 1.85% of the popular vote and 1 out of 30 Senators. In the 7 February and 21 April 2006 Chamber of Deputies elections, the party won 1 out of 99 seats.
