= Gérard Latortue =

Prime Minister of Haiti from 2004 to 2006

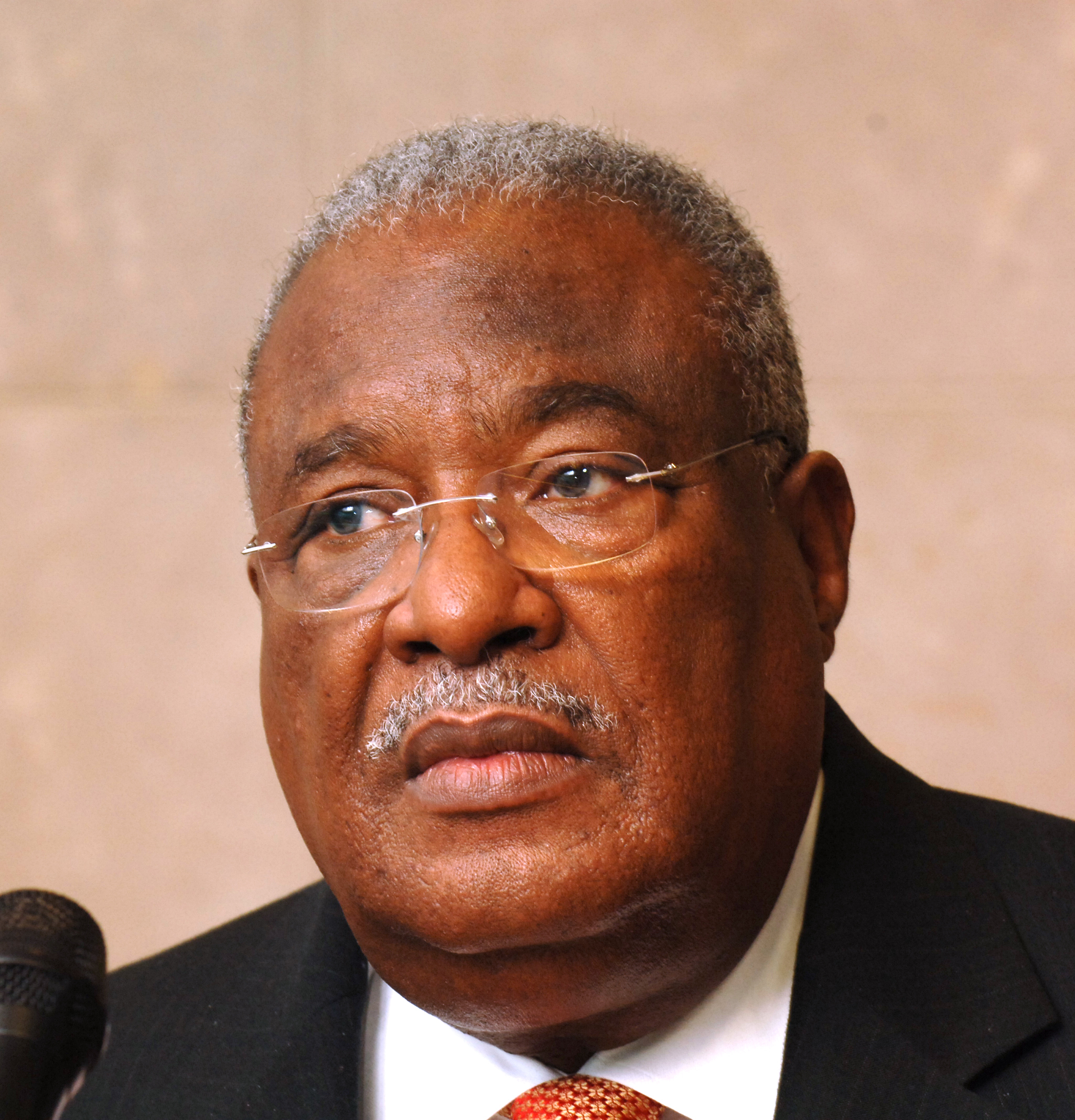
- Latortue in 2005

12th Prime Minister of Haiti
- In office 12 March 2004 – 9 June 2006
- President: Boniface Alexandre (provisional); René Préval
- Preceded by: Yvon Neptune
- Succeeded by: Jacques-Édouard Alexis

Foreign Minister of Haiti
- In office 12 February 1988 – 20 June 1988
- Preceded by: Hérard Abraham
- Succeeded by: Hérard Abraham

Personal details
- Born: 19 June 1934 Gonaïves, Haiti
- Died: 27 February 2023 (aged 88) Boca Raton, Florida, US
- Party: Independent
- Spouse: Marlene Zéphirin (m. ?–2023; his death)
- Children: 3, including Alexia

Gérard Latortue (French pronunciation: [ʒeʁaʁ latɔʁty]; 19 June 1934 – 27 February 2023) was a Haitian politician and diplomat who served as the prime minister of Haiti from 12 March 2004 to 9 June 2006. He was an official in the United Nations for many years, and briefly served as foreign minister of Haiti during the short-lived 1988 administration of Leslie Manigat.

== Career ==
In February 2004, the country experienced a coup d'état which saw the removal and exile of President Jean-Bertrand Aristide. Breaking with the Haitian constitution a "council of the wise" was set up by the international powers to choose a new Prime Minister. Latortue was selected by the council and appointed head of the interim government on 9 March while still living in the United States, and was sworn in on 12 March.

His administration was recognized by the United Nations, the United States, France, and Canada. He was denied recognition by the governments of Jamaica, Venezuela, and the Caribbean Community (CARICOM). His government was beset with opposition from the Fanmi Lavalas political party (and with them, a large amount of the Haitian populace) and violence by and between gangs, rebels, and militants (especially in Port-au-Prince and its metropolitan area), many of whom are either former members of the Haitian Armed Forces (disbanded by Aristide in 1995) or street gang supporters of the Aristide government "Chimere".

The 2006 elections in Haiti, to replace the interim government of Latortue established after the 2004 Haitian coup d'état, were delayed four times after having been originally scheduled for October and November 2005. The elections finally took place on 7 February 2006. The 129 member Haitian Parliament was also elected at this election. Run-off elections for the Chamber of Deputies of Haiti were held on 21 April 2006. In June 2006, Latortue was succeeded by Jacques-Édouard Alexis.

Latortue was the head of the observer mission of La Francophonie in Togo for that country's October 2007 parliamentary election.

== Personal life and death ==
Latortue had three children. His daughter, Alexia, served in the United States Department of the Treasury during the Biden administration.

Latortue died after a fall on 27 February 2023, at the age of 88.

== Notes ==
Political offices
Preceded by Yvon Neptune	Prime Minister of Haiti; 2004–2006	Succeeded by Jacques-Édouard Alexis
