= Marc Bazin =

Haitian politician (1932–2010)

Marc Louis Bazin

Minister without portfolio
- In office March 14, 2002 – September 20, 2002
- President: Jean-Bertrand Aristide
- Prime Minister: Yvon Neptune
- Succeeded by: Robert Ulysse

Minister of Planning and External Cooperation
- In office March 2, 2001 – January 21, 2002
- President: Jean-Bertrand Aristide
- Prime Minister: Jean Marie Chérestal
- Preceded by: Anthony Dessources
- Succeeded by: Paul Duret

President of Haiti
- Provisional
- In office June 19, 1992 – June 15, 1993
- Prime Minister: Himself
- Preceded by: Joseph Nérette
- Succeeded by: Jean-Bertrand Aristide

4th Prime Minister of Haiti
- In office June 19, 1992 – August 30, 1993
- President: Himself
- Preceded by: Jean-Jacques Honorat
- Succeeded by: Robert Malval

Minister of Finance and Economy
- In office February 3, 1982 – July 12, 1982
- President: Jean-Claude Duvalier
- Preceded by: Emmanuel Bros
- Succeeded by: Frantz Merceron

Personal details
- Born: March 6, 1932 Saint-Marc, Haiti
- Died: June 16, 2010 (aged 78) Port-au-Prince, Haiti
- Party: National Unity Party (1957-1986); Mouvement for the Instauration of Democracy in Haiti (MIDH)
- Spouse: Marie-Yolaine Sam
- Profession: Lawyer

Marc Louis Bazin (French pronunciation: [maʁk lwi bazɛ̃]; March 6, 1932 – June 16, 2010) was a World Bank official, former United Nations functionary, and Haitian Minister of Finance and Economy under the dictatorship of Jean-Claude Duvalier. He was the prime minister of Haiti, appointed on June 4, 1992, by the military government that had seized power on September 30, 1991.

== Life ==
Born in Saint-Marc, his father, Louis Bazin, was a member of the elite in Artibonite. He studied law and economics at the Solvay Institute in Brussels and later worked as an economist for the World Bank from 1972 to 1976. Bazin served as Minister of Finance and Economy for six months in 1982.

He was considered to be the favorite Haitian presidential candidate of the George H. W. Bush administration and the bourgeois population of Haiti. When the country could no longer last in foreign relations as a military dictatorship and had to open the government up to free elections in 1990, Bazin was seen as a front runner if the elections were to happen before the Left in Haiti had time to reorganize.

Ultimately, Bazin received 14% of the vote, Jean-Bertrand Aristide winning the Haitian general election, 1990 –1991, with 67%. After nine months, Aristide was deposed by a military coup. In June 1992, the army appointed Bazin as acting president. Washington's initial response was that he held the post illegally, but they soon warmed up to him and pressed Aristide to negotiate with the military and Bazin. With the change in administrations from Bush to Clinton, the policy changed. He resigned on June 8, 1993.

Bazin was also a fervent political opponent of Aristide, and ran in the 2006 election for the presidency of Haiti, but was reported to have received only about 0.68% of the vote in the 35-candidate race.

Bazin died of prostate cancer at his home in Pétion-Ville, Port-au-Prince, on 16 June 2010.
