= Christian National Union for the Reconstruction of Haiti =

Christian National Union for the Reconstruction of Haiti Union Nationale Chrétienne pour la Reconstruction d'Haïti
- Leader: Jean Chavannes Jeune
- Founded: 2005
- Ideology: Christian democracy
- Political position: Centre
- Chamber of Deputies: 0 / 119
- Senate: 0 / 30

The Christian National Union for the Reconstruction of Haiti (Union Nationale Chrétienne pour la Reconstruction d'Haïti) is a political party in Haiti. In the presidential elections of 7 February 2006, its candidate Jean Chavannes Jeune won 5,6% of the popular vote. The party won in the 7 February 2006 Senate elections 4.3% of the popular vote and 2 out of 30 Senators. In the 7 February and 21 April 2006 Chamber of Deputies elections, the party won 12 out of 99 seats. In the presidential elections of 21 April 2011, it obtained 1.80% of the votes.
