= Christian Movement for a New Haiti =

Christian Movement for a New Haiti Mouvement Chrétien pour une Nouvelle Haïti
- President: Luc Mesadieu
- Founded: 1991
- Headquarters: Port-au-Prince
- Ideology: Christian democracy
- Political position: Centre to centre-right
- Chamber of Deputies: 0 / 119
- Senate: 0 / 30

The Christian Movement for a New Haiti (Mouvement Chrétien pour une Nouvelle Haïti, Mochrenha) is a political party in Haiti.

== History ==
The party was founded in 1991 by Evangelical Protestant churches. Mochrenha was registered officially as a political party on 25 January 1999, but only on 13 July 1999 was it recognized by the electoral authorities.

The party gained three seats in the Chamber of Deputies at the 2000 elections. In the presidential elections of 7 February 2006, its candidate Luc Mesadieu won 3.35% of the popular vote. The party won in the 7 February 2006 Senate elections 4.9% of the popular vote and no Senators. In the 7 February and 21 April 2006 Chamber of Deputies elections, the party won three out of 99 seats.

In 2013, the party became a member of the Patriotic Movement of the Democratic Opposition (Mouvement Patriotique de l'Opposition Démocratique, MOPOD), a coalition of parties that oppose to President Michel Martelly.

For the 2015 presidential election, Renold Jean Claude Bazin was presented as the party's candidate. For the 2015 parliamentary elections, the party presented three candidates for the Senate and 19 for the Chamber of Deputies.
