= Pont (Haiti) =

Communal section of Saint-Marc in Haiti

PONT (lit. 'Bridge'), officially the Political Party for Us All (French: Parti politique pou nou tout), is a centre-left political party in Haiti. Jean Marie Chérestal, Prime Minister from 2 March 2001 to 21 January 2002, was the leader of the party. The party won in the 7 February 2006 Senate elections 1.1% of the popular vote and two senators. In the 7 February and 21 April 2006 Chamber of Deputies elections, the party won no seats.

For the 2015 parliamentary elections, the party presented 3 candidates for the Senate and 52 for the Chamber of Deputies.
