= Citizens' Group for Hope =

Political party in Haiti

Citizens' Group for Hope Regwoupman Sitwayen Pou Espwa
- Abbreviation: Respè
- Leader: Charles Henri Baker
- Founded: 2006

The Citizens' Group for Hope (Haitian Creole: Regwoupman Sitwayen Pou Espwa, abbreviated Respè, meaning "Respect") is a political party in Haiti. It was founded in 2006 by businessman Charles Henri Baker to contest that year's general election. Baker has since led the party and stood as its presidential candidate twice, in the 2006 and 2015 elections.

The party's campaigns focused on job creation and improving government functions, with a particular focus on the youth vote.

== History ==
Charles Henri Baker, a prominent business leader and wealthy industrialist, founded the party in the run-up to the 2006 general election. Baker was the party's candidate in the presidential election on 7 February 2006; he won 8.24% of the popular vote, finishing third. Baker represented his party once again in the November 2010 presidential election, finishing sixth with the 2.38% of popular vote.

Baker stood again as the party's candidate in the 2015 presidential election, which was won by Jovenel Moïse. For the 2015 parliamentary elections, the party presented 6 candidates for the Senate and 36 for the Chamber of Deputies. It did not win any seats in either house of the National Assembly.

== Policies ==
The party's program focuses on creating jobs, increasing government efficiency, and tightening the rule of law. It proposes providing more government support to the agricultural sector, and improving tax collection. The party targets Haiti's youth in particular with its messaging.

== Slogan ==
The party's slogan in Haitian Creole is "Gen plas pou tout moun. Lòd – Disiplin – Travay – RESPÈ" ("There is room for everyone. Order, discipline, work, RESPECT").
