= Serge Gilles =

Haitian politician (1936–2021)

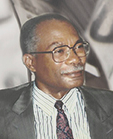

Serge Gilles (5 January 1936 – 1 February 2021) was a Haitian politician who was the leader of the Fusion of Haitian Social Democrats. He spent 25 years in overseas exile before returning to Haiti in 1986. He became the leader of the Fusion party in 2005 and was fielded as their candidate for President but lost to René Préval.

== Background ==
Gilles was born in a commune Maïssade in the Hinche Arrondissement, in the Centre department of Haiti. He attended secondary school in Hinche, then went on to further his education at Alexandre Pétion school in Port-au-Prince. He became a physical education teacher, teaching history and sports, which won him an award by the French Institute in Haiti of a scholarship to further his education. Gilles earned a degree in psychology in 1965 from the Sorbonne. He was denied entry back into Haiti so he remained in France and furthered his education. He worked for Cimade, eventually becoming director. He died on 1 February 2021, at the age of 85.
