= Fusion of Haitian Social Democrats =

Fusion of Haitian Social Democrats Fizyon Sosyodemokrat Ayiti Fusion des Sociaux-Démocrates Haïtiens
- Leader: Edmonde S. Beauzile
- Founded: 2005
- Ideology: Social democracy Third Way
- Political position: Centre-left
- National affiliation: Coalition of Progressive Parliamentarians
- International affiliation: Socialist International
- Regional affiliation: COPPPAL
- Chamber of Deputies: 0 / 119
- Senate: 0 / 30

The Fusion of Haitian Social Democrats (Haitian Creole: Fizyon Sosyodemokrat Ayiti, IPA: [fuzjɔ̃ sosjodemokɣat ajiti]; French: Fusion des Sociaux-Démocrates Haïtiens, IPA: [fyzjɔ̃ de sɔsjodemɔkʁat a.isjɛn]) —also translated in some sources as Union of Haitian Social Democrats— is a political party in Haiti.

== History ==
The party was created shortly before the 2006 elections by Serge Gilles, who in 2004 created the Haitian Socialist Grand Party (Grand Parti Socialiste Haïtien, GPSH). The GPSH merged with another parties to form the Fusion.

In the presidential elections of 7 February 2006, its candidate Serge Gilles won 2,62% of the popular vote. In the 7 February 2006 Senate elections, the party won 9.9% of the popular vote and 4 out of 30 Senators, taking second place. In the 7 February and 21 April 2006 Chamber of Deputies elections, the party won 17 out of 99 seats, also second place. It now forms part of the governing coalition under former Prime Minister Michele Pierre-Louis.

Formed in 2005 out of the fusion of social-democrats, its core platforms are equality of the genders, promotion of youth, respect for human rights, more accountability for MINUSTAH, and the rule of law promoting democracy and non-violence.

For the 2015 presidential election Beauzile Edmone Supplice was presented as the party's candidate. For the 2015 parliamentary elections, the party presented 11 candidates for the Senate and 85 for the Chamber of Deputies.
