= Lespwa =

Hope Front Fwon Lespwa Front de L'espoir
- President: René Préval
- Founded: 2005
- Dissolved: November 28, 2009; 16 years ago
- Split from: Fanmi Lavalas
- Succeeded by: Patriotic Unity
- Headquarters: Port-au-Prince
- Ideology: Populism
- National affiliation: Coalition of Progressive Parliamentarians (partial)
- Colours

Fwon Lespwa was a Haitian political coalition headed by René Préval, who served as president from 1996 to 2001 and from 2006 to 2011. The name Lespwa is the Haitian Creole form of the French l'espoir, meaning "hope". The coalition's full French name is Front de l'Espoir (Hope Front). Lespwa included many members and former members of the last government of Jean-Bertrand Aristide and his Fanmi Lavalas (Flood Family).

USAID and the IRI attempted to form a rump Lavalas organization with Marc Bazin, but Aristide along with nearly all of Fanmi Lavalas refused to recognize Bazin's candidacy. While publicly boycotting the elections, Lavalas overwhelmingly supported the election of René Préval, which it saw as a return to peace and democracy.

In the February 2006 presidential election, Préval was the Lespwa candidate. With 90% of the vote counted by February 13, he was leading with 49% of the vote. On February 16, 2006, Préval was declared the winner with 51.21% of the vote, once a number of uncounted voters were tabulated. Supporters of Lespwa found a massive dump of burned charred voting cards marked for Preval. A massive persecution upon supporters of the ousted Aristide government by the illegal interim government of Gerard Latortue preceded the 2006 election cycle. The party won 18.9% of the popular vote in the 7 February 2006 Senate elections with 13 out of 30 Senators and 23 out of 99 deputies in the Chamber of Deputies. Lespwa's parliamentary caucus formed part of the governing coalition under Jacques-Édouard Alexis, but soon formed a political alliance, the Coalition of Progressive Parliamentarians, that filed a motion of no confidence in Alexis' government during the 2008 food crisis. It has since rejected two of Préval's nominees for prime minister; through the electoral alliance, Lespwa's leaders have gained a majority in the Chamber.

Lespwa was disbanded in November 2009 in favor of Unity (Inite), the successor party of many pro-Préval supporters, including factions from other parties.
