= Evans Paul =

Prime Minister of Haiti from 2015 to 2016

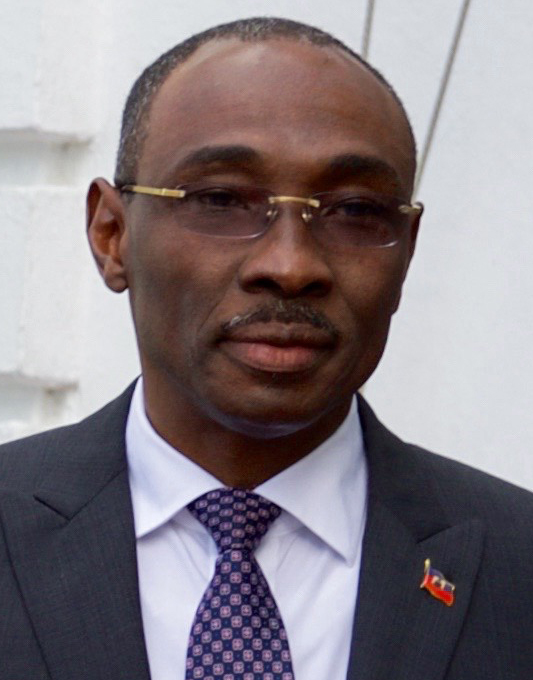
- Paul in 2015

Acting President of Haiti
- In office 7 February 2016 – 14 February 2016
- Prime Minister: Himself
- Preceded by: Michel Martelly
- Succeeded by: Jocelerme Privert (interim)

17th Prime Minister of Haiti
- In office 16 January 2015 – 26 February 2016
- President: Michel Martelly; Himself (acting); Jocelerme Privert (interim)
- Preceded by: Florence Duperval Guillaume (acting)
- Succeeded by: Fritz Jean

Personal details
- Born: 25 November 1955 (age 70) Port-au-Prince, Haiti
- Party: Democratic Alliance Party
- Other political affiliations: Democratic Convergence (2000–2004)
- Spouse: Irene Ridore

Evans Paul (born 26 November 1955), also known as Compère Plume; shortened as K-Plume (KP), is a Haitian politician and former president of the Democratic United Committee. He was elected mayor of Port-au-Prince in the 1990 elections that brought Jean-Bertrand Aristide's National Front for Change and Democracy party to power, and he served as a campaign manager for a time during Aristide's 1990 campaign. He made an unsuccessful run for President of Haiti in the 2006 elections under the Democratic Alliance Party banner. On December 25, 2014, President Michel Martelly announced Evans Paul as Haiti's new prime minister. On February 2, 2016, he resigned. He remained in his position due to an agreement signed on 6 February, until a prime minister could be reached by consensus and an interim president could be elected by Parliament for a 120-day term.

He used to host the program "Plume" on Radio Caraïbes from 1974 to 1976, from where he got his nickname. From 1977 to 1980, he hosted Konbit Pitit Kay on Radio Cacique.

Political offices
| Preceded by Florence Duperval Guillaume; Acting | Prime Minister of Haiti; 2015–2016 | Succeeded by Fritz Jean |
