= Jean Marie Chérestal =

10th Prime Minister of Haiti

His Excellency Jean Marie Chérestal

10th Prime Minister of Haiti
- In office March 2, 2001 – March 15, 2002
- President: Jean-Bertrand Aristide
- Preceded by: Jacques-Édouard Alexis
- Succeeded by: Yvon Neptune

Jean Marie Chérestal (French pronunciation: [ʒɑ̃ maʁi ʃeʁɛstal]; born 18 June 1947) was prime minister of Haïti from 2 March 2001 to 21 January 2002. He is the leader of the political party known as Pont ("bridge").

He was Minister of Finance from 1995 to 1996.

Political offices
Preceded by Jacques-Édouard Alexis	Prime Minister of Haïti; 2001–2002	Succeeded by Yvon Neptune
