= Struggling People's Organization =

Struggling People's Organization Organisation du Peuple en Lutte Òganizasyon Pèp k ap Lite
- Abbreviation: OPL
- General Coordinator: Edgard Leblanc Fils
- Founded: 23 November 1994; 31 years ago
- Headquarters: Port-au-Prince, Haiti
- Ideology: Social democracy Populism
- Political position: Centre to centre-left
- National affiliation: Coalition of Progressive Parliamentarians
- International affiliation: Socialist International (observer)
- Regional affiliation: COPPPAL; São Paulo Forum
- Colors: Red; Green
- Chamber of Deputies: 0 / 119
- Senate: 0 / 30

Website
- www.oplhaiti.org

The Struggling People's Organization (French: Organisation du peuple en lutte, Haitian Creole: Òganizasyon Pèp k ap Lite) is a political party in Haiti. It originated within the broader Lavalas political movement and was founded in November 1994 as the Lavalas Political Organization (French: Organisation Politique Lavalas, OPL), adopting its current name in 1996 following a split within the movement.

In October 1996, supporters of former president Jean-Bertrand Aristide split from the party to form Fanmi Lavalas. During the mid-1990s, the OPL emerged as one of Haiti's principal political parties and held a majority in Parliament, supporting the government of Prime Minister Rosny Smarth between 1996 and 1997. During this period, the party supported economic reforms that included privatization initiatives and fiscal austerity measures. These policies were intended to address Haiti's economic difficulties and meet the requirements of international financial institutions, but they also generated political controversy and opposition.

After the 1997 parliamentary election, the OPL contested the results and alleged electoral irregularities and fraud. The party became one of the principal opponents of Fanmi Lavalas during the late 1990s and early 2000s. Critics and supporters of Aristide have accused the OPL of receiving support from foreign governmental agencies and participating in efforts to undermine Aristide's government between 2001 and 2004, although such claims remain disputed.

In the 2006 Haitian general election, OPL presidential candidate Paul Denis received 2.62% of the vote. In the Senate elections held the same year, the party won 6.0% of the popular vote and secured three of the thirty-one seats. In the elections to the Chamber of Deputies, it won ten of the chamber's 102 seats. Following the election, the OPL joined the governing coalition led by Prime Minister Jacques-Édouard Alexis from 2006 to 2008.

== Electoral performance ==
=== Presidential ===
| Election | Candidate | First round | | | | Second round | | | |
| Election | Candidate | Votes | % | Position | Result | Votes | % | Position | Result |
|---|---|---|---|---|---|---|---|---|---|
| 2006 | Paul Denis | 50,751 | 2.62% | 7th | Lost | | | | |
| 2010–11 | No presidential candidate | | | | Lost | | | | |
| 2015 | Sauveur Pierre Étienne | 30,144 | 1.94% | 7th | Lost | | | | |
| 2016 | No presidential candidate | | | | Lost | | | | |
| 2026 | Edgard Leblanc Fils | TBD | TBD | TBD | Lost | | | | |

=== Parliamentary ===
==== Senate ====
| Election | Leader | Votes | % | Seats | +/– | Position | Government |
|---|---|---|---|---|---|---|---|
| 2006 | Paul Denis | 243,047 | 5.99% | 3 / 30 | New | 5th | Government (2006–2008) |
| 2006 | Paul Denis | 243,047 | 5.99% | 3 / 30 | New | 5th | Opposition (2008–2011) |
| 2010–11 | Paul Denis | Unknown | Unknown | 1 / 30 | ▼2 | ▲6th | Opposition |
| 2015–16 | Andris Riché | Unknown | Unknown | 1 / 30 | | ▲3rd | Opposition |
| 2016–17 | Andris Riché | 84,437 | 3.95% | 0 / 30 | ▼1 | ▼7th | Opposition |

==== Chamber of Deputies ====
| Election | Leader | Votes | % | Seats | +/– | Position | Government |
|---|---|---|---|---|---|---|---|
| 2006 | Paul Denis | 142,318 | 8.02% | 9 / 99 | New | 3rd | Opposition |
| 2010–11 | Paul Denis | Unknown | Unknown | 2 / 99 | ▼7 | ▼6th | Opposition |
| 2015–16 | Andris Riché | Unknown | Unknown | 10 / 119 | ▲8 | ▲3rd | Opposition |
