= Fanmi Lavalas =

Lavalas Family Famille Lavalas Fanmi Lavalas
- Leader: Jean-Bertrand Aristide
- Founded: 30 October 1996
- Split from: Lavalas Political Organization
- Headquarters: HT6110 Port-au-Prince, Ouest, Haiti
- Ideology: Social democracy
- Political position: Centre-left
- International affiliation: Socialist International; Progressive Alliance
- Colors: Blue
- Chamber of Deputies: 0 / 119
- Senate: 0 / 30

Fanmi Lavalas (English: Lavalas Family; lavalas is Haitian Creole for 'avalanche' or 'flood') is a social-democratic political party in Haiti. Its leader is former Haitian President Jean-Bertrand Aristide. It has been a powerful force in Haitian politics since 1991. Fanmi Lavalas governments advocate a policy of "growth with equity" based on Western European social democratic principles. Fanmi Lavalas governments have emphasised investment in education and health care as their priorities and have refused International Monetary Fund austerity measures.

== History ==
Lavalas emerged as a powerful social movement in the late 1980s, and it backed Jean Bertrand Aristide's election campaign in 1990. The establishment of the Lavalas movement as a formal political party, renamed Fanmi Lavalas, took place in 1996 as a split by Aristide from the Struggling People's Party (OPL) over the question of his resumption of the three years he lost in exile following the 1991 coup Two main reasons for its creation are known: (1) to allow the Lavalas movement to remain inclusive while opposing the neo-liberal policies of the foreign-influenced OPL, which was one of the conditions for Aristide's return to power in 1994; (2) to prevent rival politicians from taking over the movement's leadership from Aristide and other more left-wing leaders. The Haitian military overthrew Aristide's first government in 1991. "Fanmi Lavalas" may be roughly translated into English as "Avalanche Family" or "Waterfall Family" (referring to the Biblical flood), but the name is almost never completely translated from Haitian Creole, although it is sometimes given as "Lavalas Family". It was registered officially as a political party on 30 October 1996, and on 14 February 1997 it was recognized by the electoral authorities.

Elections were set for 2006 by the Interim Government, which was established by the governments of Canada, the US, and France. Certain members of Fanmi Lavalas claimed that Marc Bazin was the Lavalas candidate. However, its grassroots supporters overwhelmingly supported René Garcia Préval in his campaign as president. Lavalas candidates boycotted the election for the most part, but its voters supported the emergence of Preval's Lespwa party. The results of the election of the 7 February and 21 April 2006 Chamber of Deputies are not available.

=== Election exclusion ===
The performance of the Fanmi Lavalas party in Haitian elections has been difficult to measure since the 2004 coup d'état that toppled it from power as it has been repeatedly excluded from the democratic process. It was again excluded from participation in the 2010–2011 Haitian general election by the electoral council after the candidates did not receive the necessary votes.

=== 2015 presidential and legislative election ===
CEP accepted Lavalas' request to contest election in the 2015 election. In highly controversial elections that were forced to be rerun due to credible charges of electoral fraud, the party's presidential candidate, Maryse Narcisse only received 110,449 votes, or 7.32% of popular votes. The party's legislature candidates received 5 seat out of 85 already elected seats in the 2015 parliamentary election, a second round will be held in December 27. The process and outcome of the 2015-2016 elections are still seen as controversial and are widely viewed as having damaged the credibility of the government of President Jovenel Moise and the Parti Haïtien Tèt Kale (Bald-head party).

== Members of Committee ==
Youseline Augustin Bell - Committee of Finance, Jacob François - Commission of Information, Majolie Zéphirin - Commission of Information, Jean Luc Bell - Commission of Youth. Members: Louis Bonnet, Ernst Montoban, Jerry Jean Louis, Jean Pierre Barthol, Gary Servius, Claudine Janvier, Philippe André Jacques, Bazelais François, Fritz Péan, Roosevelt Goguette, Abel Moise, Vital Tholerme, Bellefleur Jean, Romane Joseph, Jean Elie Pierre-Louis, Rivière Dantès, Tony Désir, André Joseph
