= 47th Legislature of the Haitian Parliament =

The 47th Legislature of the Haitian Parliament was elected on three dates. Initial elections were held on May 21 and July 9, 2000, electing all 82 seats in the Chamber of Deputies and nineteen seats in the Senate. A further eight seats in the Senate were elected on November 26, alongside the presidential elections. The first round of legislative elections generated so much conflict that the fall elections were boycotted by the opposition.

The 47th Legislature was dissolved by the 2004 Haitian coup d'état, and was succeeded by the 48th Legislature in 2006.

== List of members ==
=== Chamber of Deputies ===
Source.

Name	District	Party	Department
Rudon Boyer	Dessalines	Lavalas	Artibonite
Huberman Chérilus	L’Estère	Lavalas	Artibonite
Joël Coustine	Marmelade / St Michel	Lavalas	Artibonite
Odigé Daricot	Gde. Saline / Desdunes	Lavalas	Artibonite
Yvon Douceur	Anse Rouge et Terre Neuve	MOCHRENA	Artibonite
Marc André Durogène (1)	Gonaives	Lavalas	Artibonite
Marcson Erdain	Gros Morne	Lavalas	Artibonite
Schillo Fadael	Pte Rivière de l’Artibonite	Lavalas	Artibonite
André Jérôme	Verrettes	Lavalas	Artibonite
Mezac Louis Jean	Ennery	Lavalas	Artibonite
Amanus Maette	St. Marc	Lavalas	Artibonite
Henrio Mondésir	La Chapelle	Lavalas	Artibonite
Olide Brunot	Mirebalis / Boucan Carré / Saut d’Eau	Lavalas	Central
Simon Cessoir	Cerca Cavajal	Lavalas	Central
Miléon Desravines	Cerca la Source / Thomassique	Lavalas	Central
André Jeune Joseph	Hinche et Thomonde	Lavalas	Central
Levy Joseph	Belladère	Lavalas	Central
Théodore Max	Maissade	Lavalas	Central
Clotaire Toussaint	Savanette	Lavalas	Central
Babeau Villier	Lascahobas	Lavalas	Central
Wilkens Candy	Pestel / Beaumont	Lavalas	Grande Anse
Jean Nigal Denis	Abricot / Bonbon	Lavalas	Grande Anse
Jean-Richard Dupré	Jérémie	Lavalas	Grande Anse
Organier Laurent	Anse d’Ainault / les Irois	Lavalas	Grande Anse
Jean Acklush Louis Jeune	Dame Marie	Space	Grande Anse
Jean Ernio Marc	Corail / Roseaux	Lavalas	Grande Anse
Jean Nicolas Noël	Miragoâne / Pte Rivière de Nippes	Lavalas	Grande Anse
Walter Norzéus	Baradères / Grand Boucan	Lavalas	Grande Anse
Jethro Pierre	Petit Trou de Nippes	Lavalas	Grande Anse
Larousse Pleteau	Moron / Chamberllan	Lavalas	Grande Anse
Ulrick Saint Cyr	Anse à Veau /L’Azile	Lavalas	Grande Anse
Danise Alexis	Milot	Lavalas	Northern
Pierre Paul Cotin	Limbé	Lavalas	Northern
James Desrosiers	Cap-Haitien	Lavalas	Northern
Gabriel Ducatel	Borgne et Port-Margot	Escamp	Northern
Charles Géraud	Pignon, Ranquitte / La Victoire	Lavalas	Northern
Kéled Joseph	Limonade / Quartier Morin	Lavalas	Northern
Gesner Lamour	Acul du Nord	Lavalas	Northern
Nahoum Marcellus	Grande Rivière du Nord	Lavalas	Northern
Théodore Saint-Hilus	Plaisance et Pilate	Lavalas	Northern
Jocelyn Saint-Louis (2)	Saint Raphael / Dondon)	Lavalas	Northern
Philosias Accilus	Ouanaminthe / Vallières / Carice / Mombrun Crochu	Espace	North-East
Jean Amos Elie	Fort-Liberté, Ferrier et Perches	Lavalas	North-East
Rudy Hérivaux	Trou du Nord / Caracol	Lavalas	North-East
Ronald Joseph	Ouanaminthe / Mont Organisé / Capotille	Lavalas	North-East
Sylvestre Lindor	Sainte Suzanne	Lavalas	North-East
Gérald Pierre	Terrier Rouge	Lavalas	North-East
Joseph Berny	Saint Louis du Nord et Anse à Foleur	Lavalas	North-West
Adly Dubréus	Port-de-Paix	PLB	North-West
Thomas Etienne	La Tortue	Espace	North-West
Rock Excéus	Môle Saint Nicolas, Bombardopolis et Baie de Henne	Lavalas	North-West
Dominique Philord	Jean Rabel	Lavalas	North-West
Momprévil Saint Juste	Bassin Bleu	PLB	North-West
Gilvert Angervil	La Gonave	Lavalas	West
Melchior Antoine	Arcahaie	Lavalas	West
Yves Cristallin	Delmas	Lavalas	West
Millien Romage Fritzner	Carrefour	Lavalas	West
Désilus Jean-Marie	Léogâne	Lavalas	West
F. Richelle Lafaille	Croix des Bouquets / Thomazeau	Lavalas	West
Simpson Libérus	Port-au-Prince 3ème circ.: Zone Sud (3)	Lavalas	West
Etienne Lionel	Port-au-Prince: 2ème circ.: Zone Est (4)	Lavalas	West
Dufort Milord	Petit-Goâve	Lavalas	West
Jean-Bertrand Mathurin	Ganthier / Fonds Verettes	Lavalas	West
Doran Pheliton	Pétion-Ville / Kenscoff	Lavalas	West
Raymonde Rival	Cornillon	Lavalas	West
Ernst Vilsaint	Port-au-Prince: 1ère circ.: Zone nord (5)	Lavalas	West
Calixte Bosse	Aquin	Lavalas	South
Jean Candio	Cavaillon / Saint Louis du Sud	Lavalas	South
Bernard Dorismond	Coteaux / Roche à Bateaux	Lavalas	South
Pierre Francky Exius	Torbeck / Chantale	Lavalas	South
Augustin François	Camp Perrin / Maniche	Lavalas	South
Axène Joseph	Port à Piment	Lavalas	South
William Joseph	Tiburom	Lavalas	South
François Mételus	Cayes / l‘Île à Vaches	Lavalas	South
Leclerc Paurice	Chardonnières / Les Anglais	Lavalas	South
Jean-Robert Placide	Port-Salut / St Jean du Sud / Arniquet	Lavalas	South
Wilner Content	Jacmel	Lavalas	South-East
Sainvoys Pascal	Marigot / Cayes-Jacmel	MOCHRENA	South-East
Bolivar Ramilus	Côtes de Fer	Lavalas	South-East
F. Jean Saint Gladys	Bainet	Lavalas	South-East
Willy Senatus	Thiotte / Grand Gosier / Anse à Pitre)	Lavalas	South-East
Riguel Thibeau	Belle Anse	MOCHRENA	South-East
Jean Etzer Valentin	Vallée de Jacmel	Lavalas	South-East

== Leaders ==
=== Senate ===
Name	Took office	Left office	Party
Yvon Neptune	28 August 2000	14 March 2002	Fanmi Lavalas
Fourel Célestin	27 March 2002	29 August 2004	Fanmi Lavalas
Yvon Feuillé	29 August 2004	8 September 2004	

=== Chamber of Deputies ===
Name	Took office	Left office	Party
Sainvoyis Pascal	28 August 2000	2000	
Pierre Paul Cotin	? – December 2000	28 February 2002	
Rudy Hériveaux	28 February 2002	October 2002–?	
Yves Cristalin	? – April 2003	January 2004	
