= Déjean Bélizaire =

Haitian politician (1935–2025)

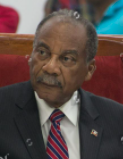
- Born: March 4, 1935; Petite Rivière de l'Artibonite
- Died: September 18, 2025 (aged 90)
- Occupation: politician

Déjean Bélizaire (4 March 1935 – 18 September 2025) was a Haitian politician who served as president of the Senate from 1991 to 1993. He was the founder and leader of the Mouvement National Patriotique du 28 Novembre and became one of the legislative leaders opposing Jean-Bertrand Aristide's return to the presidency after his ouster in the 1991 coup d'état.

== Early life and education ==
Bélizaire was born on 4 March 1935 in Petite Rivière de l'Artibonite. He was the head of Haitian Students Union (UNEH) in the late 1950s. He opposed the Duvalier dictatorship, which eventually forced him into exile. He first gained notice in Haiti during the student movements of 1960, later fleeing to the United States to escape the regime's repression.

== Political career ==
After returning to Haiti in 1976, Bélizaire became active in both politics and academia, teaching at the State University of Haiti before founding the Mouvement National Patriotique du 28 Novembre (MNP-28), a center-left party.

Bélizaire was elected to the Senate in 1990 and served as its president from 1991 to 31 January 1993, holding the position during the September 1991 coup d'état that overthrew Jean-Bertrand Aristide. He emerged as one of the main legislative opponents of Aristide's return, became an active supporter of the post-coup regime, and, with Senator Eddy Dupiton, frequently represented it in negotiations. A leaked U.S. Embassy document named him, along with army chief Raoul Cédras and Prime Minister Jean-Jacques Honorat, as working on a strategy to block Aristide's reinstatement.

In January 1992, Bélizaire signed a U.S.-backed agreement in Caracas endorsing René Théodore as prime minister, but soon withdrew his support on returning to Port-au-Prince, placing the accord in jeopardy. He said Théodore, a Communist, was unacceptable and attributed his reversal to Aristide's stubbornness and opposition from "many political sectors," while observers suggested he and Dupiton anticipated the pact's failure and that military hostility to communism shaped his stance. The following month, he signed an Organization of American States (OAS)-brokered agreement with Aristide and other parliamentary leaders on terms for Aristide's return, though its implementation remained uncertain amid military resistance. In March, as president of the Assembly, Bélizaire declared a quorum present during debate on a OAS- and US-backed plan, but then reversed himself and announced there were not enough members, forcing adjournment of the session.

In May 1992, Bélizaire signed an accord to form a national unity government with Honorat, Cédras, and Chamber of Deputies president Alexandre Médard. According to diplomatic and Haitian sources, Marc Bazin's appointment as prime minister the following month was the result of a plan devised by Bélizaire, Cédras, Honorat, and Bazin himself. The four had reportedly met on 6 October 1991, shortly after the coup, and agreed to install Joseph Nerette as interim president and Honorat as acting prime minister until Bazin could take office.

Following the disputed 1993 Haitian Senate election, which were denounced as fraudulent, Bélizaire claimed to have been re-elected but was purged under international pressure along with other politicians. In October 1993, after U.S. troops withdrew from Port-au-Prince, he announced that he and other ousted senators would return to Parliament, charging that the government had violated the accord to restore Aristide.

In the February 2016 presidential election, Bélizaire stood as a candidate for Haiti's provisional presidency, but secured only two votes in Parliament, finishing far behind Jocelerme Privert and Edgard Leblanc Fils.

== Later life and death ==
An engineer by training and a specialist in hydrology and hydraulics, Bélizaire had been among the designers of President Jovenel Moïse's Caravane du changement program, contributing to rural agricultural works, drainage projects in the Artibonite Valley, and road infrastructure in the Nord-Est Department. Following the assassination of Moïse in July 2021, Bélizaire settled in the United States.

Bélizaire died on 18 September 2025, at the age of 90.
