= 1995 Haitian general election =

- 17 December 1995
- Presidential election
- Turnout: 27.80%
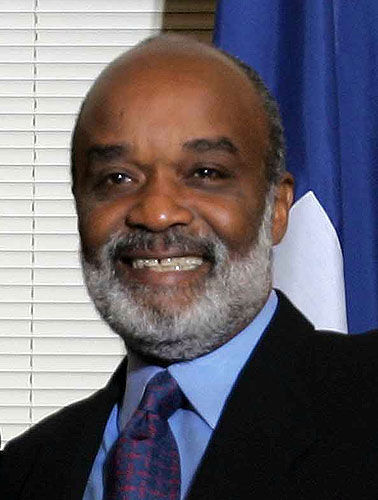

Nominee	René Préval	Léon Jeune
Party	Fanmi Lavalas	Independent
Popular vote	818,014	23,188
President before election
Jean Bertrand-Aristide
National Front for Change and Democracy
Elected President
René Préval
Fanmi Lavalas
- Chamber of Deputies election
- Turnout: 31.09%
Party	Leader	Seats	+/–
Fanmi Lavalas	René Préval	67	New
FNCD		2	−25
GMRN		1	New
KONAKOM		1	New
PANPRA		1	New
PROP		1	New
RDCH		1	New
MKN		1	−4
Independents	–	5	0
This lists parties that won seats. See the complete results below.
- Senate election
- Turnout: 31.09%
Party	Leader	Seats	+/–
Fanmi Lavalas	René Préval	17	New
FNCD		1	−12
KONAKOM		1	New
RDCH		1	New
Independents	–	7	+6
This lists parties that won seats. See the complete results below.

General elections were held in Haiti in 1995 for the presidency and for seats in the Chamber of Deputies and the Senate. The presidential election, held on 17 December, resulted in a victory for René Préval of Fanmi Lavalas. The parliamentary elections, held on 25 June, 13 August and 17 September, were also won by Lavalas. Voter turnout was just 31.09% for the parliamentary elections and 27.8% for the presidential elections.

Préval was inaugurated as president of Haiti on 7 February 1996, which was the first peaceful transition of power from one elected Haitian president to another.

== Background ==
The 25 June 1995 parliamentary elections were the first to be held in Haiti since the return of President Jean-Bertrand Aristide during Operation Uphold Democracy in 1994. In the parliamentary elections, around 11,000 candidates ran for 700 seats, including in the National Assembly and local and municipal councils. In total, 2,200 political offices were contested during the general election, and 3.4 million of the four million eligible voters in Haiti were registered. There were relatively few violent incidents during the campaign compared to past elections in Haiti, leading to free and fair elections, according to the OAS observer mission.

== Results ==
=== President ===
Candidate	Party	Votes	%
René Préval	Fanmi Lavalas	818,014	
Léon Jeune	Independent	23,188	
Victor Benoit	National Congress of Democratic Forces	21,513	
Rene Julien		12,960	
Jean Jacques Clark Parent	Haitian Democratic Party	12,842	
Edy Volel	Christian Democratic Rally		
Richard Vladimir Jeanty	Paradise Party		
Francis Jean	Revolutionary Military Force		
Jean Arnold Dumas	National Party of Workers' Defence		
Julio Larosiliere			
Dieuveuil Joseph	Haitian Social Democratic Party		
Gerard Dalvius	Alternative Party for the Development of Haiti		
Rockefeller Guerre	Union of Democratic Patriots		
Firmin Jean-Louis			
Total			
Total votes		994,599	–
Registered voters/turnout		3,578,155	27.80
Source: Nohlen

=== Chamber of Deputies ===
Party	Votes	%	Seats	+/–
Fanmi Lavalas			67	New
National Front for Change and Democracy			2	–25
Faction of the National Reconstruction Movement			1	New
National Congress of Democratic Forces			1	New
National Progressive Revolutionary Party			1	New
Power Association of Popular Organisations			1	New
Christian Democratic Rally			1	New
National Cobite Movement			1	–4
Other parties			3	–
Independents			5	0
Total			83	+2
Total votes	1,140,523	–		
Registered voters/turnout	3,668,049	31.09		
Source: Nohlen, IPU

=== Senate ===
Party	Votes	%	Seats	+/–
Fanmi Lavalas			17	New
National Front for Change and Democracy			1	–12
National Congress of Democratic Forces			1	New
Christian Democratic Rally			1	New
Independents			7	+6
Total			27	0
Total votes	1,140,523	–		
Registered voters/turnout	3,668,049	31.09		
Source: Nohlen, IPU
