= Thomas Eddy Dupiton =

Haitian politician

Thomas Eddy Dupiton is a Haitian politician who served as a disputed president of the Haitian Senate, backed by the Haitian Army, from January 1993 to February 1994.

Dupiton was born in 1942. He worked as a lawyer.

In September 1991, Senator Dupiton supported the coup of Army chief Raoul Cédras against president Aristide. After the Senate elections in January 1993, pro-Aristide camp elected Firmin Jean-Louis as the President of the Senate and pro-Army camp of senators elected Dupiton as the President of the Senate. Dupiton was succeeded by Bernard Sansaricq as the pro-Army President of the Senate. Dupiton later emigrated to United States.

He was a senatorial candidate in the 2016 elections from Artibonite department.
