= Joseph Lambert (Haitian politician) =

Haitian politician

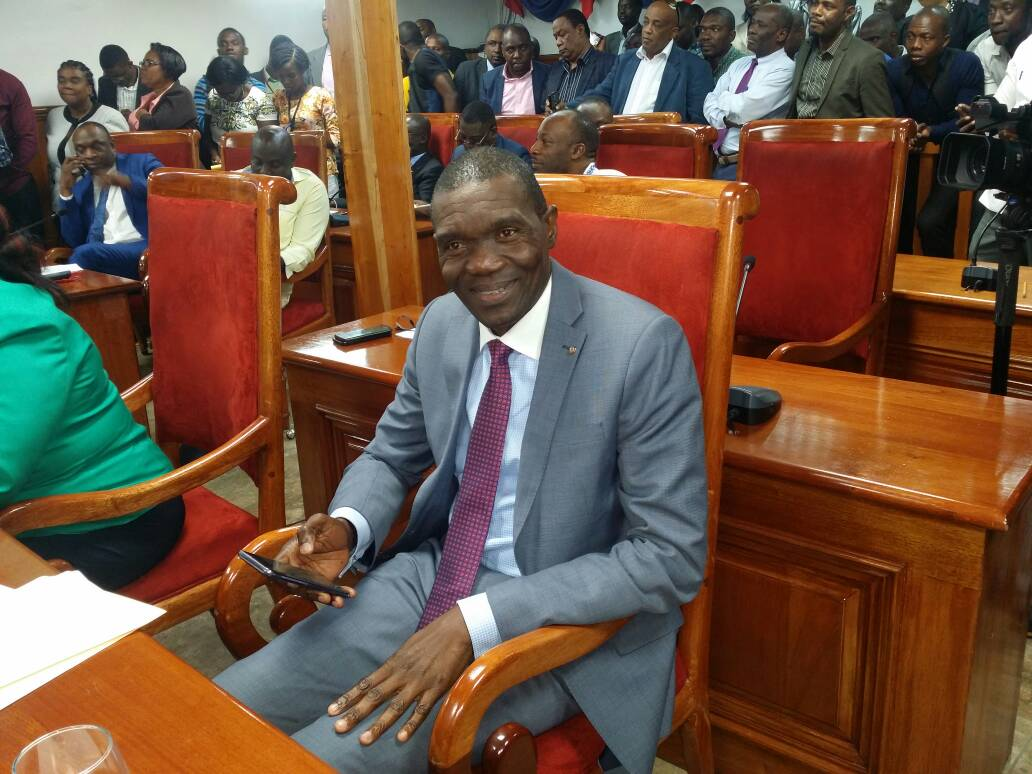

President of the Haitian Senate
- In office 12 January 2021 – 10 January 2023
- Preceded by: Pierre François Sildor
- Succeeded by: Vacant
- In office 9 January 2018 – 17 January 2019
- Preceded by: Youri Latortue
- Succeeded by: Carl Murat Cantave
- In office 11 May 2006 – 18 January 2008
- Preceded by: Yvon Feuillé
- Succeeded by: Kely Bastien

Personal details
- Born: 5 February 1961 (age 65) Jacmel, Haiti
- Party: KONA
- Other political affiliations: Lespwa

Joseph Lambert (born 5 February 1961 in Jacmel) is a Haitian politician who served as the president of the Haitian Senate from 2021 to 2023. Lambert had previously been the president of the Senate from 2006 to 2008 and from 2018 to 2019. He was sanctioned by Canadian and American authorities for his involvement in the global illicit drug trade, corruption, and gross violations of human rights on 4 November 2022.

His claim to the presidency following the assassination of President Jovenel Moïse was disputed, due to a lack of constitutional guidance and the fact that only ten elected senators remained in the legislative body. Acting Prime Minister Claude Joseph had also claimed to take charge of Haiti following the presidential vacancy in 2021. The United Nations meanwhile recognized Claude Joseph as the legitimate acting President. On 9 July, a group of eight senators of Haiti nominated Lambert to replace assassinated Jovenel Moïse as president, but this move was not recognized by the acting prime minister Claude Joseph.

Lambert was set to be sworn-in as President of Haiti on 10 July, but he stated that it had been postponed by the senators, so that all of them could be present during the ceremony. However, he later revealed to The New York Times that he had been made to abandon the swearing-in because of pressure from the United States, which had decided to recognize Ariel Henry as the interim Prime Minister and urged him to not declare himself as the President.

After Henry started coming under scrutiny for his alleged involvement in Moïse's murder, Lambert again claimed to be Haiti's President and tried to have himself sworn-in at the Parliament building on 14 September 2021. A gunfight however broke out and Lambert was unable to enter. He was also warned against the move by diplomats of other countries.

Lambert was injured in an assassination attempt on 8 January 2023 in Port-au-Prince near the National Assembly building.

== U.S. and Canadian Government Actions Against Lambert ==
Lambert was sanctioned by the U.S. Treasury Department on November 4, 2022, pursuant to Executive Order 14059 of December 15, 2021, “Imposing Sanctions on Foreign Persons Involved in the Global Illicit Drug Trade.” The Office of Foreign Assets Control designated Lambert for having engaged in, or attempted to engage in, activities or transactions that have materially contributed to, or pose a significant risk of materially contributing to, the international proliferation of illicit drugs or their means of production. In Concert with that action, Secretary of State Blinken designated Lambert — under Section 7031(c) of the Department of State, Foreign Operations, and Related Programs Appropriations Act, 2022 — for his involvement in significant corruption and a gross violation of human rights. Canada's Minister of Foreign Affairs, Mélanie Joly, announced coordinated sanctions against Lambert under the Special Economic Measures (Haiti) Regulations on November 4, 2022.

Political offices
Preceded by Yvon Feuillé	President of the Haitian Senate; 2006–2008	Succeeded by Kely Bastien
Preceded by Youri Latortue	President of the Haitian Senate; 2018–2019	Succeeded by Carl Murat Cantave
Preceded by Pierre François Sildor	President of the Haitian Senate; 2021–2023	Vacant
