= Eyes of the Heart =

Eyes of the Heart may refer to:

- Eyes of the Heart (album), by Keith Jarrett (1979)
- Eyes of the Heart (film), a 1920 crime film
- Eyes of the Heart, a 2004 play by Catherine Filloux
- "Eyes of the Heart (Radio's Song)", song by India.Arie on the Radio film soundtrack (2003)
- The Eyes of the Heart (book), 1999 memoir by Frederick Buechner
- Eyes of the Heart (Aristide book), a 2000 book by Jean-Bertrand Aristide
- The Eyes of the Heart, a 1905 play by Minnie Maddern Fiske
