= Jean Jacques Clark Parent =

Jean Jacques Clark Parent is a writer, poet, composer, singer, playwright, novelist, and philosopher. He was born in Pétion-Ville, Haiti on October 17, 1951. He was a Senator of the Republic of Haiti, elected in 1990 under FNCD in the Ouest department.

Clark Parent is the founder and producer of the Haitian musical group, Les Frères Parent, which was made up of his brother and sister. Together they produced well over 15 albums. They won numerous awards and recognized globally for their fight for human rights in Haiti. The group has collaborated with notable film maker Jonathan Demme and the Neville Brothers.

As a writer and novelist, Clark has published numerous books in both French and Haitian Creole, like Jadin La Kilti, Mi Dieu Mi Bete, Quand Les Dieux Sont Amoureux, Le Comportement de L'Haitien a travers la Psychanalise, N'ap Kanzo nan filozofi, Clark Parent: Ce Qu'il Croit et Ce Qu'il Panse, L'eloge de l'Absurde, and La Clef des Problematique Haitienne.

As a playwright, he has written Libetin, L'ile Sauvage, La Tragedie de Sergo, Mize Makiye, Le Mari Ilegal, Doleyis, and Les Fils des Dechoukes.

He has also written a book of traditional Haitian riddles entitled ZoPelinZo, with theorist J.T. Chatagnier.

Together with a group of Haitian citizens, Clark Parent is the founder of the political party, Parti Democrate Haitien, also known as PADEMH.

Clark Parent also was the founder of Radio Creole on 88.9 FM. The station was later demolished by the Cédras military regime for supporting the return of Jean Bertrand Aristide to Haiti.

Presently, Clark is the director and founder of a non-profit organization, CRECOP. Located in Pétion-Ville, CRECOP's mission is built on educating the mass.

Clark Parent continues to devote his work in bringing about change in Haiti.
