= 2016 Haitian presidential election =

The term 2016 Haitian presidential election may refer to:

- February 2016 Haitian presidential election
- November 2016 Haitian presidential election
