= 1993 Haitian Senate election =

Disputed 1993 partial Senate elections in Haiti

Partial Senate elections were held in Haiti on 18 January 1993 to elect one-third of the 27-member Senate. The elections were held alongside by-elections for one seat in the Senate and three in the Chamber of Deputies.

Held under the rule of Raoul Cédras (who had overthrown the democratically elected government in a 1991 coup) and overseen by Marc Bazin, the elections were declared illegitimate by the Permanent Council of the Organization of American States. The members elected were supportive of the coup. Voter turnout was reported to be low. Supporters of exiled president Jean-Bertrand Aristide denounced the elections as illegal. The United States and the Organization of American States opposed the elections because they would delay the negotiations to restore Aristide's government.

== Aftermath ==
On 2 March, police and soldiers entered Parliament to try to remove 13 parliamentarians elected in 1990 in order to ensure the newly elected members could take their place. The presence of the members elected in the 1993 elections was an additional obstacle in the negotiations to return to civilian rule; however, it was agreed that they would not take their seats.
