= Lovinsky Pierre-Antoine =

Haitian human rights activist and political leader

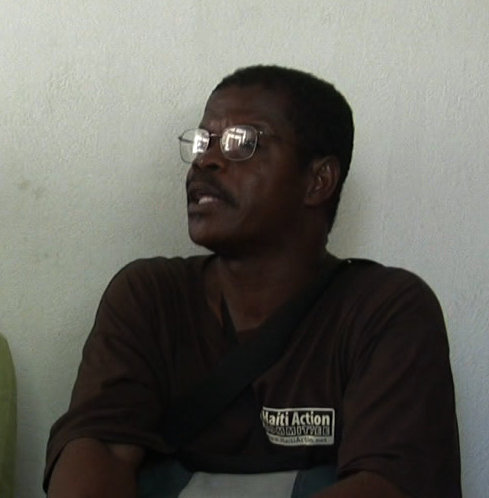
- Disappeared: August 12, 2007; Delmas, Port-au-Prince Arrondissement, Ouest, Haiti
- Status: Missing for 19 years, 1 month and 10 days
- Occupation: human rights activist
- Organization: Fondasyon Trant Septanm (FTS) (September 30 Foundation)
- Known for: Head of the Fondasyon Trant Septanm (FTS)
- Spouse: Michelle Pierre-Antoine

Lovinsky Pierre-Antoine is a Haitian human rights and political activist and former head of the Fondasyon Trant Septanm (FTS) (September 30 Foundation), an advocacy group founded to assist victims of the 1991 coup that removed Haiti's first elected president, Jean-Bertrand Aristide, from office.

== Background ==
The FTS foundation worked to win the release of hundreds of political prisoners, including some detained during the 2004-06 "interim government". Lovinsky had announced his intention to run for the office of Senator as a candidate of the Fanmi Lavalas party. He was working as an adviser to their delegation in Haiti.

== Disappearance ==
On August 12, 2007, he was abducted after a meeting in Delmas with American and Canadian human rights investigators. Because his whereabouts were known, some believed that someone associated with Lovinsky betrayed him. Two days later, on August 14, 2007, his family was contacted and a ransom of US$300,000 was demanded, but there was no further contact from his abductors. His disappearance was taken up by Amnesty International.

== See also ==
- List of kidnappings
- List of people who disappeared mysteriously: post-1970
