= Pierre François Sildor =

Haitian politician

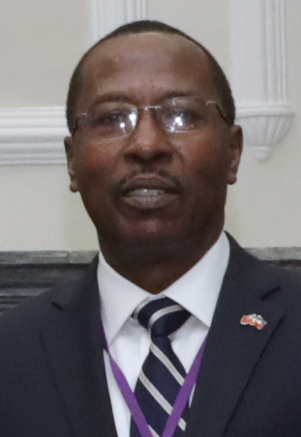
- Sildor in 2017

President of the Haitian Senate
- In office 14 January 2020 – 12 January 2021
- Preceded by: Carl Murat Cantave
- Succeeded by: Joseph Lambert

Personal details
- Born: 1955 (age 70–71) Haiti
- Party: Haitian Tèt Kale Party

Pierre François Sildor (born 1955) is a Haitian politician who served as president of the Haitian Senate from 14 January 2020 to 12 January 2021.

He was born in 1955. He was elected to the Senate of Haiti from PHTK party.

Political offices
Preceded by Carl Murat Cantave	President of the Haitian Senate; 2020–2021	Succeeded by Joseph Lambert
