= Carl Murat Cantave =

Haitian politician

President of the Haitian Senate
- In office 17 January 2019 – 14 January 2020
- Preceded by: Joseph Lambert
- Succeeded by: Pierre François Sildor

Personal details
- Born: Haiti
- Party: KID

Carl Murat Cantave is a Haitian politician who served as President of the Haitian Senate from 17 January 2019 to 14 January 2020. He is a member of the KID party, and represents the Artibonite department. Cantave was first elected to the Senate in the 2015–16 Haitian parliamentary election, one of three KID candidates to win Senate seats that election, along with Dieupie Cherubin and Onondieu Louis. He was elected President of the Senate on January 17, 2019, when he received 16 votes from the Senate, defeating his opponent Senator Pierre François Sildor, who received 12.

He was born in 1963.

After ex-Haitian rebel leader Guy Philippe was arrested on drug-trafficking charges and deported to the United States, Cantave led the push for a resolution "energetically condemning" the action, saying the Senate was "humiliated" by it. Cantave was President of the Senate when Prime Minister Jean-Henry Céant was ousted, and was involved with talks with President Jovenel Moïse about the choice of a new prime minister in 2019. During contentious efforts to install Jean-Michel Lapin as Prime Minister, opposing senators accused Cantave of siding with the county's executive office in violation of the Constitution of Haiti; Senator Nènel Cassy said Cantave "has refused to listen to the voice of reason".

Following Lapin's resignation, Cantave opposed Moïse's preferred candidate his replacement as Prime Minister, and instead Cantave and Lower Chamber President Gary Bodeau put Fritz-William Michel forward as a compromise. Confirmation proceedings for Michel in 2019 were contentious, with politicians engaging in physical fights in the national assembly, and Cantave provided instructions to police that only senators would be allowed into the Senate precinct for the proceedings. Cantave himself was forced to retreat to his car as protesters threw rocks at him outside of Parliament, and his foundation offices in Gonaïves were attacked and destroyed during protests.

Prior to his election to the Senate, Cantave worked as Minister of Health in Artibonite. During his time in that position, Cantave worked to secure financial assistance from nongovernmental organizations to renovate La Providence Hospital in Gonaïves after it was severely damaged by Hurricane Jeanne in September 2004.

In 2017 Cantave introduced a measure banning same-sex marriages in Haiti. Offenders could face up to three years in prison. The measure would also make “public demonstration of support” for homosexuality illegal. The bill was approved by the Haitian Senate.

In September 2019 Cantave was involved in a scandal concerning bribery accusations. Senator Sorel Jacinthe publicly accused Cantave of offering him and four other senators money to vote in favor of President Jovenel Moïse's new prime minister Fritz William Michel. Cantave denied the accusations.

Political offices
Preceded by Joseph Lambert	President of the Haitian Senate; 2019–2020	Succeeded by Pierre François Sildor
