= Yvon Neptune =

11th Prime Minister of Haiti

His Excellency Yvon Neptune
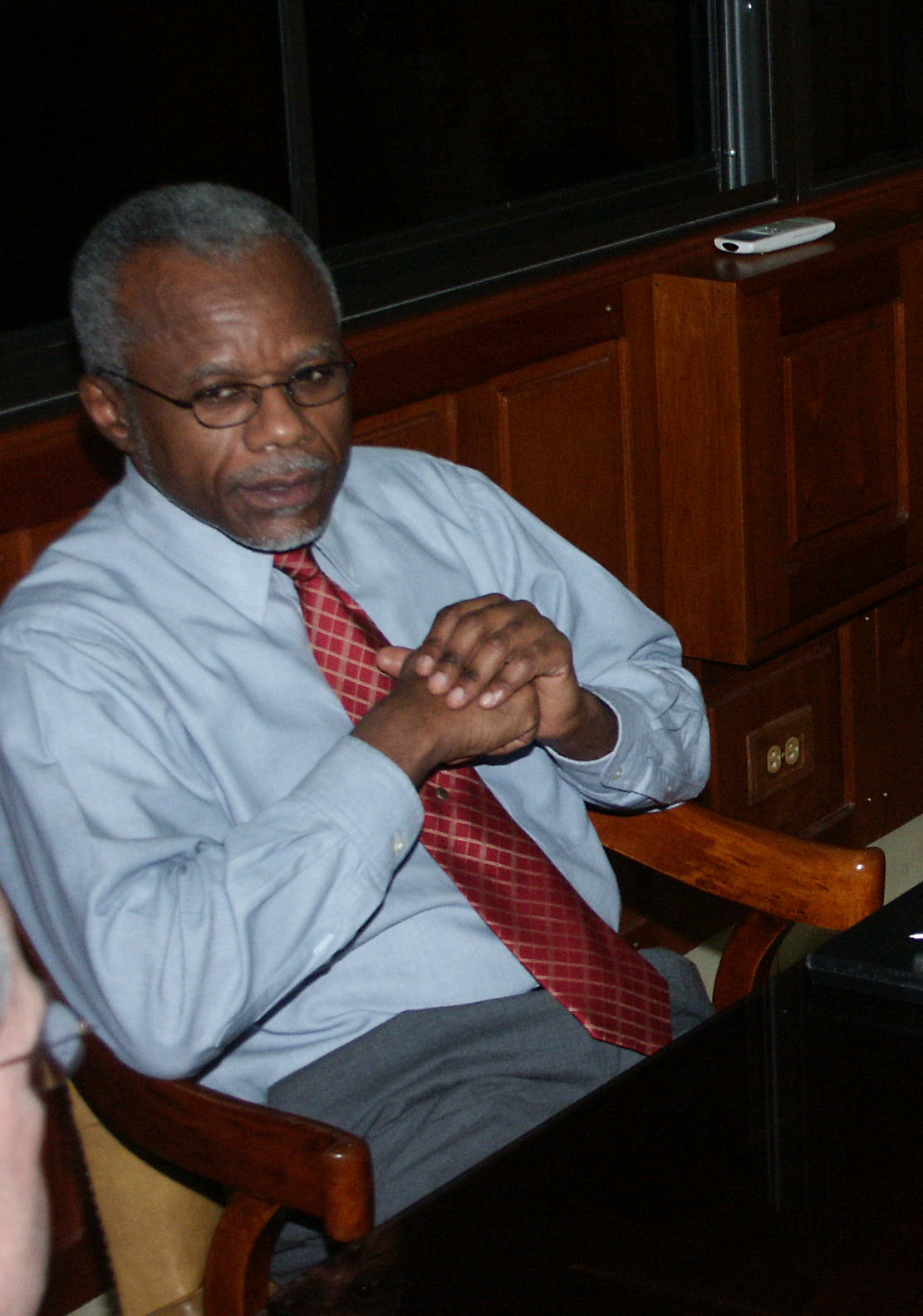
- Neptune in 2004

11th Prime Minister of Haiti
- In office 15 March 2002 – 12 March 2004
- President: Jean-Bertrand Aristide; Boniface Alexandre (provisional)
- Preceded by: Jean Marie Chérestal
- Succeeded by: Gérard Latortue

President of The Senate
- In office 28 August 2000 – 14 March 2002
- Preceded by: Edgard Leblanc Fils
- Succeeded by: Fourel Célestin

Senator from Ouest
- In office 28 August 2000 – 14 March 2002

Personal details
- Born: 8 November 1946 (age 79) Cavaellon, Haiti
- Party: Fanmi Lavalas
- Spouse: Marie-José Paul
- Occupation: Architect

Yvon Neptune (born 8 November 1946 in Cavaillon, Haiti) is a Haitian politician and architect who served as the Prime Minister of Haïti from 2002 to 2004. He was appointed by President Jean-Bertrand Aristide, and took office on 15 March 2002. He had previously served as President of the Senate from 2000 to 2002.

== Overview of activity from 2004 ==
On 2 March 2004, shortly after Aristide's removal, a mob attempted to arrest Neptune on corruption charges, however it was unsuccessful. The mob was reportedly organized by Guy Philippe after Neptune gave an interview to Kevin Pina of KPFA Flashpoints in California and the Black Commentator, and Andrea Nicastro of the Italian daily Corriere della Sera. In the interview Neptune claims he was not even present when interim-president Boniface Alexandre was sworn into office. He also referred to himself as a prisoner in his own office and backed Aristide's claims that he was forced out of office under duress. U.S. Marines guarding his residence killed two gunmen there. Neptune was replaced on 12 March 2004 by an unelected provisional government led by Gérard Latortue, which had been appointed three days earlier.

On 27 March 2004, the provisional government banned Neptune from leaving the country, along with 36 other senior officials of the Aristide administration, in order to more easily investigate corruption allegations. On 27 June 2004, after hearing about a warrant for his arrest on the radio, Neptune turned himself into the Haitian police and was held without charge. According to the Haitian constitution, a hearing before a judge is required within 48 hours for anyone arrested, but Neptune was not given such a hearing. On 4 May 2005, Thierry Fagart, the chief of the human rights division at the UN's Haiti mission, called Neptune's detention illegal.

On 19 February 2005, Neptune was taken into protective custody by United Nations peacekeeping forces and handed himself back to Haitian authorities after a Port-au-Prince penitentiary breakout.

On 18 April 2005, Neptune began a hunger strike, refusing hospitalization and offers of medical attention abroad. On May 5, he was reported as being "near death". On 23 June, Juan Gabriel Valdes - the UN's special envoy to Haïti - criticized the Haitian government's handling of Neptune and called for his release from prison.

On 14 September 2005, 14 months after Neptune was first imprisoned, a formal statement of charges against him appeared. He was accused of participating in the "La Scierie Massacre," an alleged attack by Lavalas supporters in the La Scierie neighborhood of St. Marc. Subsequent investigations, including by the United Nations, revealed the massacre to be a struggle between two armed groups, with casualties on both sides. The Haitian Appeals Court prosecutor found that there was no credible evidence of Neptune’s involvement. Lawyers at the Inter-American Commission of Human Rights said that the statement of charges "contain[ed] no indication that Mr. Neptune directly perpetrated the crimes alleged against him nor is there a clearly defined connection between Mr. Neptune and those who are alleged to have perpetrated the crimes...The mental and factual elements necessary to establish Mr. Neptune’s responsibility…remain entirely unclear.”

In May 2006, the Haitian prosecutor recommended dropping the charges against Neptune because there was no credible evidence to support them.

After spending two years in prison and never having been tried, he was released on 28 July 2006. The charges against him were not dropped; he was released on health and humanitarian grounds. Hundreds of other members or supporters of the deposed Aristide administration remained in custody without trial.

On 13 April 2007, the Appeals Court of Gonaives ruled that the courts had never had jurisdiction to try Neptune. Under Haiti’s Constitution, regular courts in Haiti cannot try high public officials unless the High Court of Justice has previously convicted them, a special court formed by the legislature, similar to impeachment in the United States. In September 2009, the Haitian Government served this decision on Neptune and the other parties. When the appeal period elapsed a few days later, the dismissal of all charges became official.

== Inter-American System Proceedings ==
In April 2005, the Institute for Justice & Democracy in Haiti (IJDH), the Bureau des Avocats Internationaux and the Hastings Human Rights Project for Haiti filed a petition on Neptune's behalf with the Inter-American Commission on Human Rights (IACHR) in Washington. In July 2006, the Commission ruled that the Government of Haiti's treatment of Neptune violated his international human rights. The Commission referred the case to the Inter-American Court of Human Rights (IACtHR), an autonomous judicial institution of the Organization of American States based in San José, Costa Rica, for further proceedings.

On 6 May 2008, the Inter-American Court of Human Rights ruled that the State of Haiti violated 11 different provisions of the American Convention on Human Rights by illegally imprisoning former Prime Minister Yvon Neptune for two years and allowing the case to drag on in the courts for almost two more. The IACHR ordered Haiti to end what it called Mr. Neptune’s continuing “judicial insecurity” and to pay him $95,000 in damages and costs. The Court also ordered Haiti to start bringing its inhumane prisons in line with minimum international standards within two years.

“From the beginning, the State failed its obligation to protect Mr. Neptune’s right to be heard by a court competent to hear the charges against him…as well as to an effective recourse,” the IACtHR said in a 60-page judgment issued publicly on June 6. The Court denounced the State’s continued failure to bring Neptune before a qualified judge, thereby leaving him in a situation of “absolute judicial uncertainty.”

The IACtHR criticized nearly every aspect of Haiti’s prosecution of Neptune, which began in June 2004 and continues today. It found Neptune’s 25-month-long detention illegal, and the prison conditions he endured to be inhumane and degrading. Although Neptune has been out of prison since July 2006, the IACHR found that the violations of his rights continue because the case has not been dismissed, and he could be returned to prison at any time. The Court also condemned the State’s ongoing failure to provide Neptune a fair hearing. The ongoing violations amount to “an unjustifiable delay in access to justice,” the Court decided.

The IACHR found numerous other violations of Neptune’s human rights. Given the state courts’ lack of jurisdiction, Neptune’s rights against illegal imprisonment and arbitrary detention were violated. Because Neptune was jailed for 14 months before receiving a statement of the charges against him, the State violated his right to be informed within a reasonable time of the charges against him. And because the case against him has still not been resolved—more than four years after Neptune was imprisoned—the State stands in violation of Neptune’s right to be judged within a reasonable amount of time.

Haiti also violated Neptune’s rights by subjecting him to inhumane prison conditions, the IACHR found. The Court singled out the National Penitentiary’s overcrowding, squalor, and lack of general security, as well as multiple threats to Mr. Neptune’s life during his incarceration.

In total, the State violated 11 different provisions of the American Convention on Human Rights, the Court found. These are: Article 1.1, on the State’s duty to respect and ensure human rights; Articles 5.1, 5.2, and 5.4, concerning the right to humane treatment; Articles 7.1, 7.2, 7.3, 7.4, and 7.5, concerning the right to personal liberty; and Article 8.1, in conjunction with Art. 25, on the right to a fair trial and the right to judicial protection.

Political offices
Preceded by Jean Marie Chérestal	Prime Minister of Haïti; 2002–2004	Succeeded by Gérard Latortue
