= Simon Dieuseul Desras =

Haitian politician

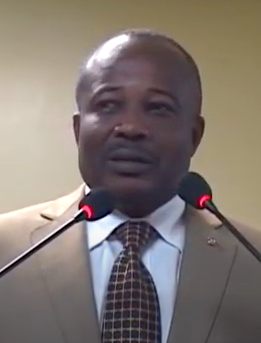
Desras in 2015

Simon Dieuseul Desras (born 18 December 1967) is a Haitian politician who served as president of the Senate from January 2012 to January 2015.

Desras was born on 18 December 1967 in Saut-d'Eau. He works as lawyer, manager and financier. He was elected to the Senate of Haiti in 2000 from Fanmi Lavalas party. Desras was elected to the Senate of Haiti in 2010 from Lavni party. He was minister of environment from 2016 to 2017. In 2021 he was appointed as minister of planning by Ariel Henry.
