= Youri Latortue =

Haitian politician (born 1967)

- Latortue in 2017

President of the Haitian Senate
- In office 13 January 2017 – 9 January 2018
- Preceded by: Ronald Larêche
- Succeeded by: Joseph Lambert

President of Haiti in Action
- Incumbent
- Assumed office 2006
- Preceded by: Party established

Personal details
- Born: 13 October 1967 (age 58) Gonaïves, Haiti
- Party: Haiti in Action (since 2006)
- Other political affiliations: Inite (before 2006)

Youri Latortue (born 13 October 1967) is a Haitian politician who served as president of the Senate from January 13, 2017 to January 9, 2018. He was sanctioned by the Canadian and United States authorities for his involvement in the global illicit drug trade November 4, 2022.

He was born 13 October 1967 in Gonaïves. A former member of the party Inite, he joined various right-wing parties. As leader of the right-wing coalition in the legislative elections of 2016, he won 29 seats in the Chamber of Deputies and 9 in the Senate. Having a senatorial majority, he was elected president of the Senate in January 2017 becoming the main opponent of the government.

Latortue is a first cousin once-removed of former prime minister Gérard Latortue.

In a leaked US Embassy cable from 2006, former US ambassador Janet Sanderson described Youri Latortue as "one of the most brazenly corrupt of leading Haitian politicians.” In other cables former US ambassador James Foley accused Latortue of being connected to drug traffickers and running "a network of dirty cops and gangs".

== U.S. and Canadian Government Sanctions Against Latortue ==
On November 4, 2022, the U.S. the U.S. Department of the Treasury’s Office of Foreign Assets Control and the Government of Canada imposed joint sanctions against Youri Latortue and President of the Haitian Senate Joseph Lambert. The sanctions targeting the former senator was a response to his allegedly involvement in "illegal activities of armed criminal gangs, including through money laundering and other acts of corruption" and having used his position to traffic drugs and collaborated with criminal and gang networks to undermine the rule of law in Haiti". The Office of Foreign Assets Control specifically mentioned Youri Latortue's lengthy involvement in the trafficking of cocaine from Colombia to Haiti.
