= 2000 Haitian presidential election =

- 26 November 2000
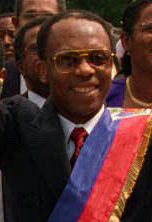

Nominee	Jean Bertrand Aristide	Arnold Dumas
Party	Fanmi Lavalas	Independent
Popular vote	2,632,534	56,678
Percentage	91.67%	1.97%
President before election
René Préval
Fanmi Lavalas
Elected President
Jean-Bertrand Aristide
Fanmi Lavalas

Presidential elections were held in Haiti on 26 November 2000. The opposition parties, organised into the recently created Convergence Démocratique, boycotted the election after disputing the results of the parliamentary elections. The result was a landslide victory for Jean-Bertrand Aristide, who received 91.7% of the vote with a turnout of around 50%.

Concerns were raised when the Organisation of American States conducted a fact-finding mission on the election and found that 10 senatorial seats in the simultaneous parliamentary elections should have gone to a second-round runoff because the candidates did not win an absolute majority as required by the constitution. This resulted in the European Union and the United States banning economic assistance to the country until 2005, which were supported by Haitian opposition members.

== Results ==
Candidate	Party	Votes	%
Jean-Bertrand Aristide	Fanmi Lavalas	2,632,534	91.67
Arnold Dumas	Independent	56,678	1.97
Evan Nicolas	Union for National Reconciliation	45,441	1.58
Serge Sylvain	Independent	37,371	1.30
Calixte Dorisca	Independent	36,233	1.26
Jacques Philippe Dorce	Independent	32,245	1.12
Paul Arthur Fleurival	Independent	31,100	1.08
Total		2,871,602	100.00
Source: Nohlen
