= Leslie Voltaire =

Haitian politician and architect (born 1949)

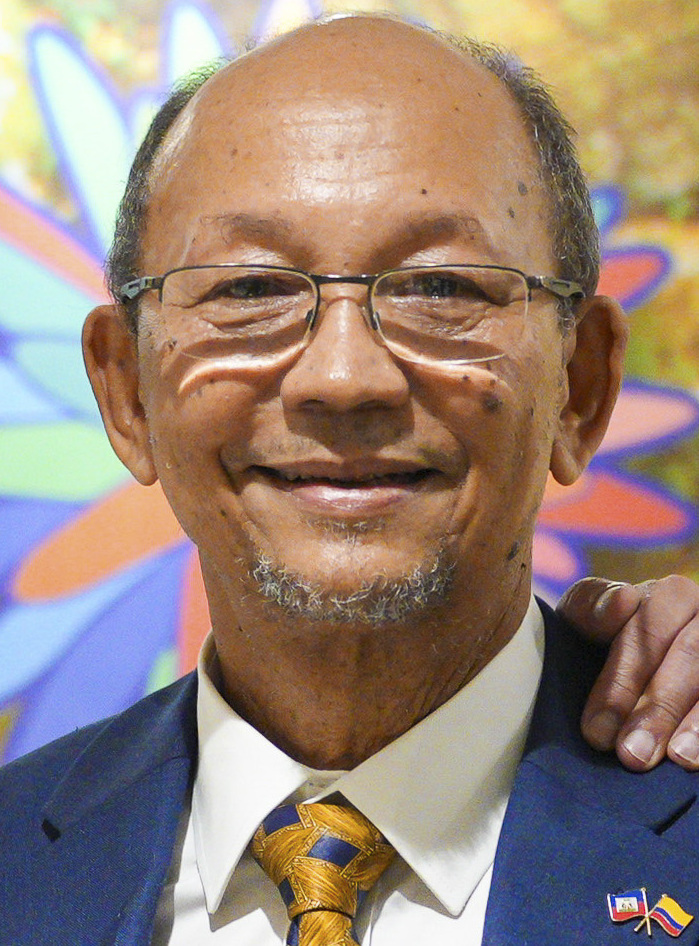
- Voltaire in 2024

2nd Chairman of the Transitional Presidential Council
- In office 7 October 2024 – 3 March 2025
- Prime Minister: Garry Conille (acting); Alix Didier Fils-Aimé (acting)
- Preceded by: Edgard Leblanc Fils
- Succeeded by: Fritz Jean

Member of the Transitional Presidential Council
- In office 25 April 2024 – 7 February 2026
- Prime Minister: Michel Patrick Boisvert (acting); Garry Conille (acting); Alix Didier Fils-Aime (acting)

Personal details
- Born: 11 July 1949 (age 76) Port-au-Prince, Haiti
- Party: Fanmi Lavalas
- Education: National Autonomous University of Mexico; Cornell University

Leslie Voltaire (born 11 July 1949) is a Haitian politician and architect who served as the 2nd chairman of the Transitional Presidential Council from October 2024 to March 2025. He previously served in the administrations of Jean-Bertrand Aristide and René Préval and was a candidate for president in the 2010 election.

== Early life and education ==
Voltaire was born on 11 July 1949 in Port-au-Prince. He is a fluent speaker of English, French, Spanish and Haitian Creole. He attended Petit Séminaire Collège Saint-Martial in Port-au-Prince and later studied at the National Autonomous University of Mexico, where he received a degree in architecture, and Cornell University in the United States, where he earned a master's degree in urban and regional planning. At Cornell, he was a Fulbright scholar.

== Career ==
Voltaire became an architect and urban planner, gaining over 40 years of experience. He helped develop several large-scale projects including a master plan for a low cost housing complex that was built in Port-au-Prince and was a consultant in the construction of a football academy. For 15 years, he served as the professor of architecture at the State University of Haiti.

Voltaire was a friend of Haitian president Jean-Claude Duvalier. Voltaire, who became a member of the political party Fanmi Lavalas, entered politics in 1990 when he was appointed a state councilor, and one year later was named by president Jean-Bertrand Aristide as the Minister of National Education and Minister of Sports. He became the chief of staff to Aristide in 1995, then remained in the government in the administration of René Préval, being appointed infrastructure advisor in 1996. In 2001, he became the Minister of Haitians Living Abroad. He authored the Voltaire law, which improved economic rights for Haitian diaspora. Voltaire was a Special Envoy to the United Nations (UN) in 2009, working with former U.S. president Bill Clinton.

In 2010, Voltaire was a leading figure in helping rebuild Haiti following a major earthquake. He ran for president in the 2010–11 Haitian general election under the party Ansanm Nou Fò, receiving 16,199 votes, 1.59% of the electorate, although there were allegations of voter fraud. Afterwards, he remained an advisor to the Lavalas party and later became a member of the executive board of the Montana Accord.

In 2024, Voltaire was appointed to the Transitional Presidential Council, the body temporarily acting as the head of state of Haiti, as one of seven members, taking office on 25 April 2024. As part of a rotating leadership of the body, Voltaire succeeded Edgard Leblanc Fils on 7 October 2024, with a term that set to expire on 7 March 2025. He took over the presidency at a time when several members of the council were the subjects of corruption allegations, and the outgoing leader, Edgard Leblanc Fils, refused to sign the decree that ratified Voltaire as the president.

Voltaire is married and has three children.

Political offices
Preceded by Edgard Leblanc Fils	Chairman of the Transitional Presidential Council; 2024–2025	Succeeded by Fritz Jean
