= Haiti in Action =

Political party in Haiti

Haiti in Action Ayiti an Aksyon
- Abbreviation: AAA
- Founder: Youri Latortue
- Founded: 2006
- Headquarters: Artibonite, Haiti
- Ideology: Populism; Cultural conservatism
- Senate: 1 / 30
- Chamber of Deputies: 6 / 119

Haiti in Action (Haitian Creole: Ayiti an Aksyon, abbreviated AAA) (Note: French: Haïti en Action) is a political party in Haiti, based in the department of Artibonite. It was founded as Artibonite in Action (Haitian Creole: Latibonit an Aksyon) (Note: French: L'Artibonite en Action) by former senator Youri Latortue in the run-up to the 2006 general election. The party has won seats in both chambers of the National Assembly, in the upper Senate and the lower Chamber of Deputies.

Multiple elected officials from the party have been accused by authorities of having direct connections to gangs in Haiti.

== History ==
Youri Latortue in 2017

Youri Latortue founded the party as Artibonite in Action before the 2006 general election, where the party won two seats in the Senate and four seats in the Chamber of Deputies.

In the 2010–11 general election, the AAA won two seats in the Senate and eight seats in the Chamber of Deputies. A member of the party was subsequently appointed the Ministry of Youth, Sports, and Civic Action in October 2011.

In the 2015–16 parliamentary election, the party fielded four candidates for the Senate and thirty-six for the Chamber of Deputies. One senator and six deputies from the AAA were elected. During the election campaign, on 23 September 2016, an assassination attempt was made on the AAA's elected senator, Gracia Delva.

On 26 April 2019, the AAA announced that it had expelled Delva from the party after he refused to speak to authorities in regard to allegations he had connections with the gang of Arnel Joseph. Delva responded by saying he could not be expelled from the AAA because he was never a member of the party, but rather a candidate who ran under a joint AAA-Haitian Tèt Kale Party ticket in the previous election.

== Ideology ==
The AAA's website stated the party gives "priority to defending the masses ... to ensure their effective participation at all levels of the administration and management of the country's affairs". The party also emphasised the importance of cultural preservation and promotion in nation-building.

== Leadership ==
The party's founder and longtime leader was Youri Latortue, a former senator who was president of the Senate from 13 January 2017 to 9 January 2018, and who most notably led 15 of his colleagues in a 2008 vote to remove then prime minister Jacques-Édouard Alexis. Latortue was sanctioned by the European Union in 2025 for allegedly financing gangs to maintain political control in Artibonite and for personal enrichment.
