= Edgard Leblanc Fils =

Haitian politician (born 1955)

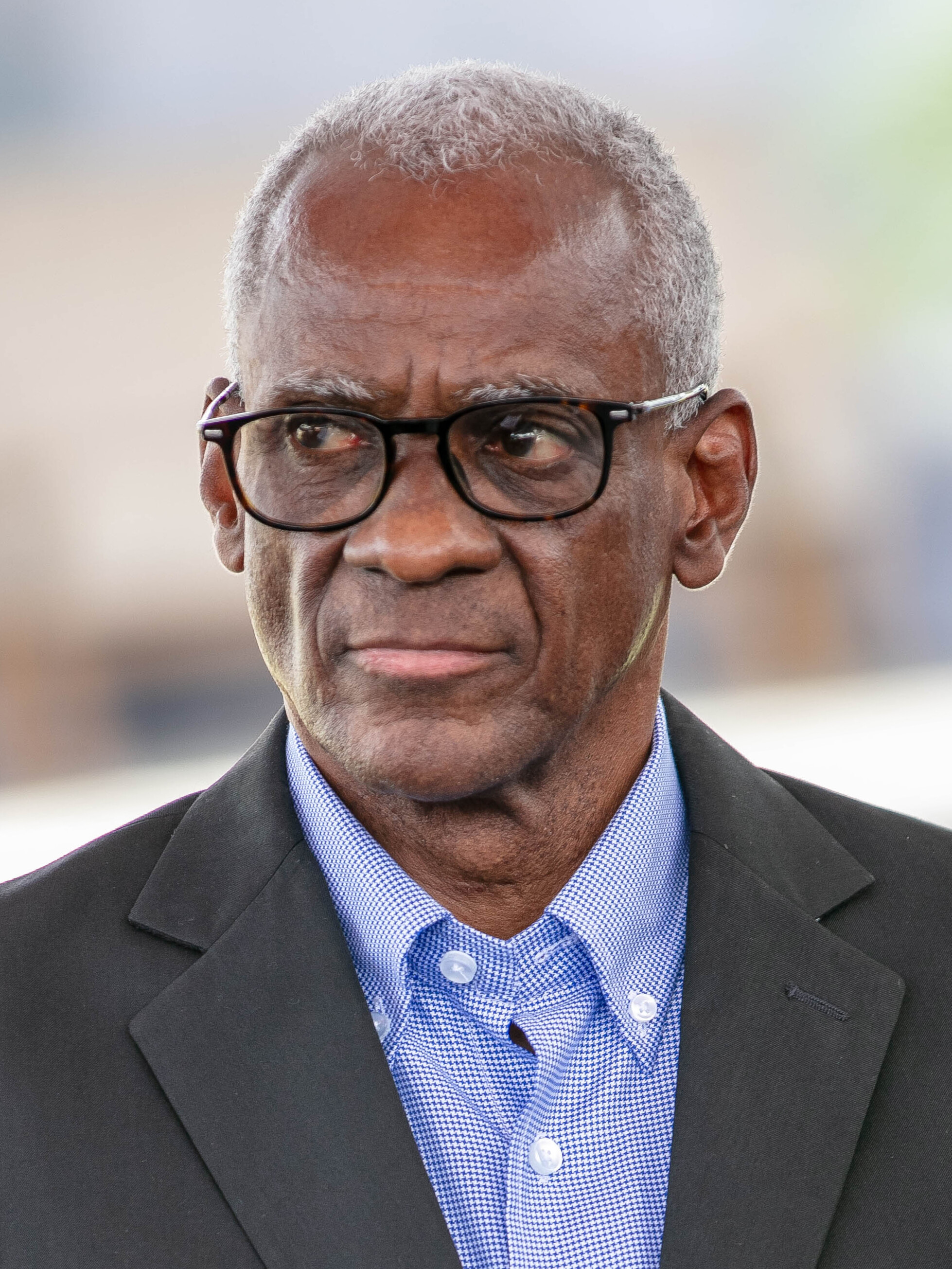
- Fils in 2024

1st Chairman of the Transitional Presidential Council
- In office 30 April 2024 – 7 October 2024
- Prime Minister: Michel Patrick Boisvert (acting); Garry Conille (acting)
- Preceded by: Jovenel Moïse (as President)
- Succeeded by: Leslie Voltaire

Member of the Transitional Presidential Council
- In office 25 April 2024 – 7 February 2026
- Prime Minister: Michel Patrick Boisvert; Garry Conille; Alix Didier Fils-Aime

General Coordinator of the Struggling People's Organization
- Incumbent
- Assumed office 17 December 2004 (Note: Acting: 10 October – 17 December 2004)
- Preceded by: Gérard Pierre-Charles

President of the Haitian Senate
- In office 13 October 1995 – March 2000
- Preceded by: Firmin Jean-Louis
- Succeeded by: Yvon Neptune

Senator from Grand'Anse
- In office 13 October 1995 – March 2000

Personal details
- Born: 18 August 1955 (age 70) Miragoâne, Haiti
- Party: OPL
- Education: State University of Haiti

Edgard Leblanc Fils (born 18 August 1955) is a Haitian civil engineer and politician who served as the 1st chairman of the Transitional Presidential Council from April to October 2024. A member of the Struggling People's Organization, he previously served as president of the Senate from 1995 to 2000. Leblanc has led the party since 2004.

== Provisional government ==
Following President Michel Martelly's resignation on 10 February 2016, he finished second to Jocelerme Privert in the second round of the indirect provisional presidential election in February 2016 (in which only the National Assembly voted).

Edgard Leblanc was one of six people named as a potential prime minister, but Fritz Jean ended up getting the nod.

During a 2024 speech to the United Nations General Assembly, Leblanc called for reparations to Haiti and denounced the Springfield pet-eating hoax. A clip of the speech went viral online, showing him drinking water directly from a pitcher, and the presidency was forced to apologize.

== Notes ==
Political offices
Preceded by Firmin Jean-Louis	President of the Haitian Senate; 1995–2000	Succeeded by Yvon Neptune
Preceded by Jovenel Moïse as President of Haiti	Chairman of the Transitional Presidential Council; 2024	Succeeded by Leslie Voltaire
