= Firmin Jean-Louis =

Haitian politician

Firmin Jean-Louis (born 1947) is a Haitian politician who served as president of the Senate twice in the 1990s.

Jean-Louis was born in February 1947 in Sainte-Suzanne. He has a bachelor's degree in political sciences from Université du Québec. He worked as a university professor in Canada. After returning to Haiti, he was elected to the Senate in 1990. He was elected to the Senate from National Front for Change and Democracy (FNCD) party. He was elected president of the Senate in January 1993, and since September 1993 his Senate presidency was disputed with Thomas Eddy Dupiton. His presidency ended in February 1994. Following the return of Jean-Bertrand Aristide to the presidency, Jean-Louis was again elected as president of the Senate from October 1994 to 13 October 1995

Jean-Louis ran as an independent candidate in the 1995 presidential elections.
