= Fourel Célestin =

Haitian politician

Jean-Marie Fourel Célestin is a Haitian politician and former President of the Senate of Haiti during Jean-Bertrand Aristide presidency.

Célestin is a colonel and medical doctor in the Army of Haiti. He is a member of Fanmi Lavalas, and followed Jean-Bertrand Aristide into exile in 1991. When Aristide returned, he appointed Célestin to head the security of the National Palace. He was appointed as director-general of the Haitian National Police from December 1995 to February 1996, but was never confirmed by the Senate.

Célestin was elected to the Senate in 1997. He was elected President of the Senate from March 2002 to January 2004.

Célestin surrendered to an arrest warrant on 1 June 2004, and was extradited and jailed in United States in July 2004 for alleged money laundering and illicit drug trafficking. He was jailed in prison in Florida. He was released from jail in June 2009, and was returned to Haiti.
