= Julio Larosiliere =

Haitian politician and businessman

Julio Larosiliere was a businessman and former Senator of the Republic of Haiti. He was one of the longest serving Principal Actor in the Haitian legislature. Senator Larosiliere was born in Cavallion, Haiti where his constituency was originally launched. He was one of the drafters of the current Haitian Constitution and perhaps its most effective advocate. A man of intrigue, honor and duty, Julio Larosiliere rose to prominence to latter compete for leadership of the Haitian nation. Senator Larosiliere remained a beacon for political and economic fair play in Haiti until his death on March 2, 2017. His legacy lives on in follow-on generations of Larosilieres in Haiti and beyond...
