= Convergence Démocratique =

Haitian political movement

Convergence Démocratique (CD; English: Democratic Convergence) was a conservative Haitian political movement created in summer 2000 in opposition to Jean-Bertrand Aristide and his Fanmi Lavalas (FL) party. A group of disparate opposition parties and social organizations, it was crafted and built by the International Republican Institute. The Convergence Démocratique was backed by "the Haitian elite, the Bush administration, the Republicans in Congress, and especially the International Republican Institute ... The International Republican Institute did all it could to urge the DC to build a national electoral constituency that could rival Aristide’s FL party at the polls ..."

Leading figures in the Convergence Démocratique made no secret of their intentions at the time of Aristide’s reinauguration as president in February 2001; they openly called for another US invasion, ‘this time to get rid of Aristide and rebuild the disbanded Haitian army’. Failing that, they told the Washington Post, ‘the CIA should train and equip Haitian officers exiled in the neighbouring Dominican Republic so they could stage a comeback themselves’." With the CD's inability to develop sufficient public support among the Haitian poor, reaching just 8% in March 2002 opinion polls, the electoral route for CD was not promising.

According to Peter Hallward,

Between June 2000 and February 2004, the CD rejected each FL offer of new elections right through to the final attempt at a peaceful resolution to the conflict, a CARICOM-brokered proposal approved by the OAS in mid-February 2004, whereby Aristide would accept one of his opponents as his prime minister, hold new legislative elections and serve out the remainder of his term with severely limited powers. Aristide accepted the deal immediately, as did France and the US. The CD refused it just as immediately and then somehow managed to ‘persuade’ its imperial patrons to follow suit, leaving Aristide with a choice between exile or civil war. As CD's leader prior to the 2004 Haitian coup d'état which overthrew Aristide, Evans Paul, put it, "We are willing to negotiate through which door [President Aristide] leaves the palace, through the front door or the back door."

The CD was dissolved after the 2004 Haitian coup d'état saw Aristide removed from office.
