= Eyes of the Heart (Aristide book) =

2000 book by Jean-Bertrand Aristide

The Eyes of the Heart: Seeking a Path for the Poor in the Age of Globalization
- Author: Jean-Bertrand Aristide, Laura Flynn (editor)
- Language: English
- Subject: Poverty in Haiti, Globalization
- Publisher: Common Courage Press
- Publication date: 2000
- Publication place: United States
- Media type: Print (Hardcover)
- Pages: 89
- ISBN: 1567511872

The Eyes of the Heart: Seeking a Path for the Poor in the Age of Globalization is a book written by Jean-Bertrand Aristide about the effects of globalization on Haiti. Aristide takes the position that globalization is not a positive factor in the world, and he cites the World Bank and the International Monetary Fund as contributing to the economic downfall of Haiti. This book was co-written by Laura Flynn, and published in 2000 by Common Courage Press.
