= February 2016 Haitian presidential election =

- 13 February 2016 (first round); 14 February 2016 (second round)
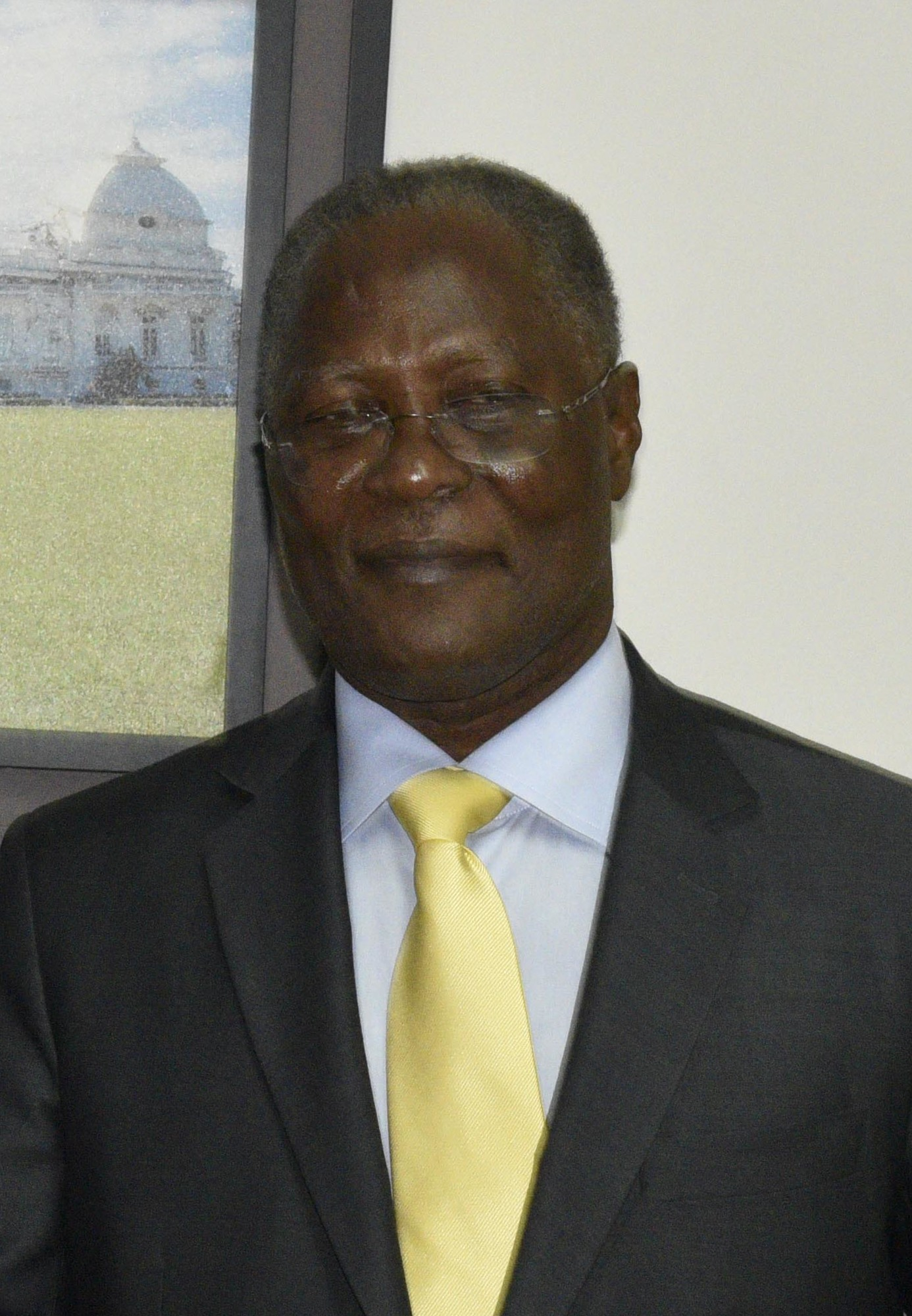

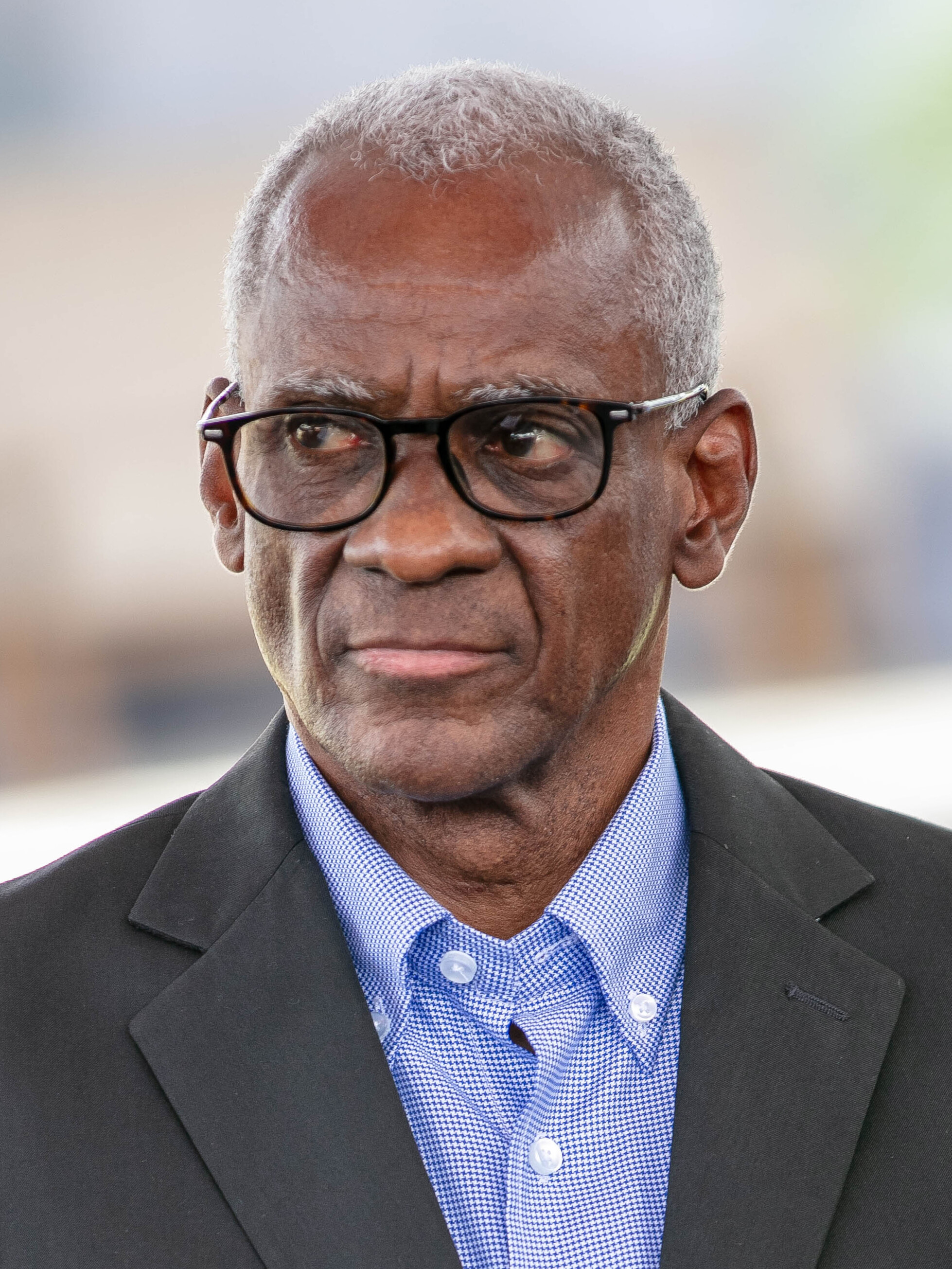
Nominee	Jocelerme Privert	Edgard Leblanc
Party	Inite	OPL
Electoral vote	77	33
Percentage	68.75%	29.46%
President before election
Evans Paul
(acting)
Democratic Alliance Party
Elected President
Jocelerme Privert (interim)
Inite

Indirect presidential elections were held in Haiti on 13 and 14 February 2016 following the annulment of the results of the 2015 elections by the Provisional Electoral Council, and after Michel Martelly resigned the presidency and Prime Minister Evans Paul assumed office as acting president on 7 February 2016. The members of the National Assembly voted for the interim President on 13 February 2016 in the first round and on 14 February in the second round.

Jocelerme Privert of Inite was elected interim President to serve until the conclusion of the 2016–17 elections. Under a multi-party agreement, Privert was supposed to oversee these elections and hand power to an elected successor within 120 days, by 14 June 2016, though electoral deadlines were missed. Following allegations of fraud in the 2015 elections, Privert created a month-long verification commission to restore legitimacy to the electoral process. In May 2016, the commission audited about 13,000 ballots and determined that the elections had been dishonest and recommended a complete rerun of the election. The rerun election took place on 20 November 2016. The second round had been scheduled for 29 January 2017, but did not take place as Jovenel Moïse was a clear winner in the first round. In the end, Privert continued in office as interim President until 7 February 2017.

== Results ==
Candidate	First round			Second round		
Candidate	Senate votes	Chamber votes	Total votes	Senate votes	Chamber votes	Total votes
Jocelerme Privert	13	45	58	13	64	77
Edgard Leblanc Fils	10	46	56	9	24	33
Déjean Bélizaire	0	0	0	0	2	2
Invalid/blank votes	0	1	1	0	2	2
Total	23	92	115	22	92	114
Source: Haiti Libre
