= Senate (Haiti) =

Upper house of the legislature of Haiti

Senate Sénat · Sena
- Currently Dissolved
- National emblem of Haiti

Type
- Type: Upper house of the Haitian Parliament
- Term limits: No limits

History
- Founded: December 1806

Structure
- Seats: 30
- Political groups: Vacant (30)
- Length of term: Six years

Elections
- Voting system: Two-round system
- Last election: 2016–17
- Next election: TBD

Meeting place
- Port-au-Prince

The Senate (French: Sénat, Haitian Creole: Sena) is the upper house of Haiti's bicameral legislature, the Haitian Parliament. The lower house of the Haitian Parliament is the Chamber of Deputies. The Senate consists of thirty seats, with three members from each of the ten administrative departments. Prior to the creation of the department of Nippes in 2003, there were twenty-seven seats. Senators are elected by popular vote to six-year terms, with one-third elected every two years. There are no term limits for senators; they may be re-elected indefinitely.

After the elections of 2000, twenty-six of the then twenty-seven seats were held by Jean-Bertrand Aristide's Fanmi Lavalas party. The Senate was not in session following the overthrow of Aristide's government in February 2004. An interim government was put in place following the rebellion, and the remaining senators were not recognised during that time. The Senate was re-established and elections were held on 21 April 2006. The next elections were scheduled to occur in 2008, when one-third of the Senate seats was opened.

In 2015, the Senate was reduced to only 10 members and the chamber of deputies was closed because the elections to replace one-third of the senators and all of the deputies in 2013 were delayed indefinitely causing senators and deputies to finish their term in January 2015 without any replacement. This led to a dysfunctional National assembly. In the 2015 parliamentary elections these two-thirds were filled with new elected members, completing the 30 senators.

In January 2020, the number of lawmakers retaining their Senate seats was again reduced to 10 as President Jovenel Moïse failed to hold elections in time to replace the others, whose terms expired before his assassination. Following the expiration of the terms of these remaining senators on 10 January 2023, Haiti has not elected members of either chamber of its Parliament.

== Latest election ==
2015 Haitian parliamentary elections
Party	Senators		
Party	1st Round	2nd Round	Total
Plateforme Vérité (VERITE)	0	3	3
Konvansyon Inite Demokratik (KID)	0	3	3
Haitian Tèt Kale Party (PHTK)	0	6	6
Struggling People's Organization (OPL)	0	1	1
Fanmi Lavalas (FL)	0	1	1
Haiti in Action (AAA)	1	0	1
Pont	0	1	1
Platfòm Pitit Desalin	0	1	1
Ligue Dessalinienne (LIDE)	1	0	1
Total	2	12	14
Seats not awarded yet			9
Seats not up in 2015 elections			9
Total seats			30
Sources: , ,

== Presidents of the Senate ==
Le Président du Sénat

Name	Took office	Left office	Party
César Télémaque	31 December 1806	February 1807	
Jean-Louis Barlatier	March 1807	April 1807	
Louis-Auguste Daumec	April 1807	May 1807	
Théodat Trichet	June 1807	1807	
Guy Joseph Bonnet	1808	4 March 1808	
Gabriel David Troy	4 March 1808	April 1808	
Jean-Louis Larose	May 1808	June 1808	
Pierre Charles Lys	July 1808	August 1808	
Philippe Bourjolly-Modé	September 1808	18 November 1808	
Louis-Auguste Daumec	18 November 1808	?	
Jean-Louis Larose	?	April 1811	
Louis Leroux	May 1811	1811	
Jean-Auguste Voltaire	1812	1812	
Jean-Louis Larose	1812	?	
Pierre Charles Lys	1813	1813	
Jean-Auguste Voltaire	1813	?	
Jean-Louis Larose	1814	1814	
Louis Leroux	1814	July 1814	
Jean-Louis Larose	August 1814	1814	
Jean-Auguste Voltaire	1814	December 1814	
Jean-Louis Larose	December 1814	1815	
Pierre Charles Lys	1815	1815	
Joseph Neptune	1815	January 1816	
Casimir Célestin Panayoty	January 1816	1816	
Jean-Baptiste Bayard	1816	?	
Pierre Simon	1817	August 1817	
Jean-Louis Larose	August 1817	?	
Hilaire Martin	? – 1820	1820 – ?	
Amédé Gayot	1821	?	
Noël Viallet	? – October 1821	October 1821–?	
Antoine Lerebours	? – October 1822	October 1822–?	
Noël Viallet	? – July 1824	February 1825–?	
Louis-Auguste Daumec	? – April 1825	April 1825 – ?	
Noël Viallet	? – January 1826	April 1826	
Pierre-Prosper Rouanez	April 1826	May 1826 – ?	
François Sambour	1827	1827 – ?	
Fonroë Dubreuil	? – 1828	1828	
Jean-François Lespinasse	1828	1828	
Louis Gabriel Audigé	1828	1828	
François Sambour	1828	1829	
Jean-François Lespinasse	1829	1830	
Antoine Martinez Valdès	1830	1830	
Eustache Frémont	1830	1831	
Louis Gabriel Audigé	1831	1831 – ?	
Joseph Georges	? – 1832	1832	
Louis Gabriel Audigé	1832	1832 – ?	
Jean Béchet	? – 1833	1833 – ?	
Jean-François Lespinasse	? – August 1833	August 1833 – ?	
Jean-Baptiste Bayard	?	1834	
Joseph Georges	June 1834	July 1834	
Noël Viallet	July 1834	1835	
Charles-Théodore Cupidon	1835	June 1835	
Pierre André	July 1835	?	
Louis D. Gilles	1836	August 1836	
Eustache Frémont	September 1836	October 1836	
Jean-Pierre Oriol	November 1836	?	
Jose Joachim Del Monte	1837	1837	
Beaubrun Ardouin	1837	?	
Amédé Gayot	1838	1838	
Charles Bazelais	1838	1838	
Beaubrun Ardouin	1838	1839	
David Troy	? – March 1846	March 1846 – ?	
Pierre Louis Bouzi	? – 1848	1848 – ?	
André Jean Simon	? – September 1849	September 1849–?	
Larouchel du Bas-de-Sainte-Anne	?	?	
Désormes Ls. Lafontant	? – 1852	1852 – ?	
Hilaire-Jean Pierre	? – 1859	1859 – ?	
Pierre-Louis Cariès	? – 1860	1860 – ?	
François Lacruz	? – September 1860	September 1860 – ?	
José Ignacio Mendoza	? – December 1860	December 1860 – ?	
Saladin Lamour	? – August 1862	August 1862 – ?	
Antoine Laforest	? – 1864	1864 – ?	
Dasny Labonté	? – 1866	1866 – ?	
Michel Dupont	? – 1870	7 June 1874	
Dasny Labonté	1875	?	
Louis Audain	1876	?	
Aristide Flambert	1877	?	
François Hippolyte	1878	July 1878	
Darius Denis	July 1878	1878	
Brunis Maignan	September 1878	1878 – ?	
Morin Montasse	1879	?	
Innocent Michel-Pierre	1880	?	
Morin Montasse	? – October 1881	1884	
Brunis Maignan	1885	1888	
Néré Numa	1889	?	
Massillon A. Aubry	1890	?	
Charles Archin	1891	1891	
Dulciné Jean-Louis	1891	?	
Brunis Maignan	1892	December 1893 – ?	
Alexis Dérac	? – August 1894	September 1894 – ?	
Pierre-Antoine Stewart	1895	1896	
Cadestin Robert	? – August 1897	August 1897 – ?	
Vaillant Guillaume	1898	1900	
Guillaume	? – 1901	1901 – ?	
Pétion Pierre-André	? – February 1904	September 1904 – ?	
D. Jean Louis	? – 1905	1905 – ?	
T. A. Dupiton	? – 1906	1907 – ?	
Stephen Archer	? – 1908	1908 – ?	
François Paulinus Paulin	1909	1911	
Joseph Davilmar Théodore	1911	1912	
Philippe Sudré Dartiguenave	1913	1914 – ?	
Stephen Archer	1915	?	
Paul Laraque	1916	1916	
Abolished	1916	1918	
Antoine Dubost	1918	1918 – ?	
Stephen Archer	? – 1919	1922	
Fouchard Martineau	? – 1931	1934 – ?	
Louis S. Zéphirin	1935	1940 – ?	
Alfred Auguste Nemours	1941	1946	
Jean Bélizaire	1946	1949 – ?	
Charles Fombrun	? – 1951	1955 – ?	
Charles Fombrun	9 April 1956	7 February 1957	
Emile Saint-Lot	1957	1957	
Hugues Bourjolly	1957	1958 – ?	
Antoine Marthold	1959	1961	
Abolished	1961	January 1988	
Louis J. Noisin	January 1988	June 1988	
No legislature	June 1988	February 1991	
Edrice Raymond	February 1991	1991	FNCD
Déjean Bélizaire	? - August 1991	31 January 1993	MNP 28
Firmin Jean-Louis and Thomas Eddy Dupiton	31 January 1993	4 February 1994	FNCD
Bernard Sansaricq	4 February 1994	October 1994	
Firmin Jean-Louis	October 1994	13 October 1995	FNCD
Edgard Leblanc Fils	13 October 1995	March 2000 – ?	OPL
Yvon Neptune	28 August 2000	14 March 2002	Fanmi Lavalas
Fourel Célestin	27 March 2002	January 2004	Fanmi Lavalas
Yvon Feuillé	January 2004	8 September 2004	Fanmi Lavalas
No legislature	8 September 2004	11 May 2006	
Joseph Lambert	11 May 2006	18 January 2008	Lespwa
Kely Bastien	18 January 2008	28 April 2011	Lespwa
Jean Rodolphe Joazile	28 April 2011	9 January 2012	PONT
Simon Dieuseul Desras	9 January 2012	12 January 2015	Lavni
Riché Andris	12 January 2015	14 January 2016	Alternative
Jocelerme Privert	14 January 2016	14 February 2016	INITE
Ronald Larêche	14 February 2016	13 January 2017	VÉRITÉ
Youri Latortue	13 January 2017	9 January 2018	AAA
Joseph Lambert	9 January 2018	17 January 2019	KONA
Carl Murat Cantave	17 January 2019	14 January 2020	KID
Pierre François Sildor	14 January 2020	12 January 2021	PHTK
Joseph Lambert	12 January 2021	10 January 2023	KONA
Vacant	10 January 2023	Present	

== See also ==
- List of current members of the Parliament of Haiti
- List of members of the Senate (Haiti)

== Notes ==
=== Further reading ===
This article incorporates public domain material from The World Factbook (2025 ed.). CIA.

- "Haiti". The World Factbook. Central Intelligence Agency. 14 November 2006. Archived from the original on 9 January 2021.
- Schutt-Ainé, Patricia (1994). Haiti: A Basic Reference Book. Miami, Florida: Librairie Au Service de la Culture. p. 167. ISBN 0-9638599-0-0.
- About parliament – Senate, Inter-Parliamentary Union
