= 2000 Haitian parliamentary election =

- Chamber of Deputies
- 21 May 2000 (first round); 9 July 2000 (second round)
- All 82 seats in the Chamber of Deputies
Party	Seats
Fanmi Lavalas	72
Christian Movement for a New Haiti	3
Others	7
This lists parties that won seats. See the complete results below.
- Senate
- 21 May 2000; 9 July 2000; 26 November 2000
- All 27 seats in the Senate
Party	Seats
Fanmi Lavalas	27
This lists parties that won seats. See the complete results below.
Prime Minister before	Prime Minister after
Jacques-Édouard Alexis; Fanmi Lavalas	Jacques-Édouard Alexis; Fanmi Lavalas

Parliamentary elections were held in Haiti on May 21 and July 9, 2000, electing all 82 seats in the Chamber of Deputies and nineteen seats in the Senate. A further eight seats in the Senate were elected on November 26, alongside the presidential elections. The first round of legislative elections generated so much conflict that the fall elections were boycotted by the opposition.

== Spring elections ==
The elections had been delayed several times and irregularities were reported before, during and after voting day. Judgments of the balloting overseen by Haiti's Provisional Electoral Council (CEP) varied from "deeply flawed," to free and fair and "the best so far"

On election day, according to the OAS Observation Mission, "polling took place in an atmosphere of calm characterized by a high voter turnout." It reported few violent incidents during the day but said that the process "began to deteriorate at the close of the polls," with armed groups in three areas stealing and burning ballot boxes. Results for the Chamber of Deputies were not disputed, but the CEP's tabulation of the Senate races was widely contested. (In Haiti, candidates for parliament must win an absolute majority of votes cast or face a second-round runoff.) In all but one geographical department, the CEP counted only votes cast for the top four contenders, ignoring those accruing to all other candidates, some 1.1 million votes. This inflated the percentages accorded the two leading contenders in each department, boosting many over the 50 percent-plus-one threshold necessary to avoid a runoff.

Opposition parties and the OAS Election Observation Mission disputed the number of Senate candidates announced as having won an absolute majority. The OAS pointed out these problematic calculations and called on the CEP to count all the votes before proceeding to the second round. The head of the Electoral Council, Léon Manus, initially maintained that the calculation method "was in keeping with past practice", and told the OAS not to interfere. He later changed his mind and did a recount but after receiving what he took as threats to his life, he left the country. The CEP declined to amend its announced results and on June 20 it suspended all observation activity. Opposition parties announced their intentions to boycott the run-off elections on July 9

Voting stations during the run-off elections for 46 deputies and two senators on July 9, 2000 were virtually empty. After this run-off election, Fanmi Lavalas was deemed to have won eighteen of the nineteen open Senate seats. The various contestations about which candidates should have gone through run-off elections obscured the fact that the very popular Fanmi Lavalas party would have likely won the disputed seats if they were subjected to a run-off; journalist Michele Wucker writes that OAS observers "reported that the irregularities would not have affected the final outcome significantly."

After a second-round voting took place on July 9 for 46 seats in the Chamber of Deputies and two seats in the Senate on July 9, the Fanmi Lavalas party won eighteen of the nineteen Senate seats and 72 of the 83 seats in the Chamber of Deputies. Voter turnout, which had been reported to be around 60% for the first round of elections, was negligible for the second round.

In response to the disputed election the United States cut off aid and blocked previously agreed loans from the Inter-American Development Bank. "In 2001, a bankrupt Aristide agreed to virtually all of the concessions demanded by his opponents: he obliged the winners of the disputed Senate seats to resign, accepted the participation of several ex-Duvalier supporters in his new government, agreed to convene a new and more opposition-friendly CEP and to hold another round of legislative elections several years ahead of schedule. But the US still refused to lift its aid embargo."

== Fall elections ==
The legislative elections on November 26, 2000 were to address the portion of the Senate that President Préval had kept intact after his dissolution of the Parliament in January 1999. These nine senators' terms had not yet expired by January 1999. During the joint presidential and legislative elections of November 26, 2000, boycotted by all the major opposition parties, these seats were won by Fanmi Lavalas Party. By the time President Aristide started his second term in February 2001, Fanmi Lavalas held 27 of the Senate seats.

An Organization of American States fact-finding mission found that 10 senatorial seats should have gone to a second-round runoff because the candidates did not win an absolute majority as required by the constitution. This resulted in the European Union and the United States banning economic assistance to the country until 2005, which were supported by Haitian opposition members.

== Results ==
=== Chamber of Deputies ===
Party	Votes	%	Seats
Fanmi Lavalas			72
Christian National Movement			3
Louvri Baryé Party			2
Espace de Concentration			2
Other parties and independents			3
Total			82
Registered voters/turnout	4,245,384	–	
Source: IPU

=== Senate ===
Party	Votes	%	Seats
Fanmi Lavalas			27
Total			27
Registered voters/turnout	4,245,384	–	
Source: IPU
