= Yvon Feuillé =

Haitian politician

Yvon Feuillé is a Haitian politician and former President of the Senate of Haiti.

Feuillé was a member of pro-Aristide Fanmi Lavalas party, but was ostracized by the party by March 2005.

Feuillé was elected to the Senate of Haiti in 1997. He was Vice President of the Senate in 2002. He was President of the Senate in 2004. Feuillé was arrested in October 2004 following the coup d'état, and was jailed for three months.
