= Jean-Bertrand Aristide =

President of Haiti (1991; 1994–1996; 2001–2004)

His Excellency Jean-Bertrand Aristide
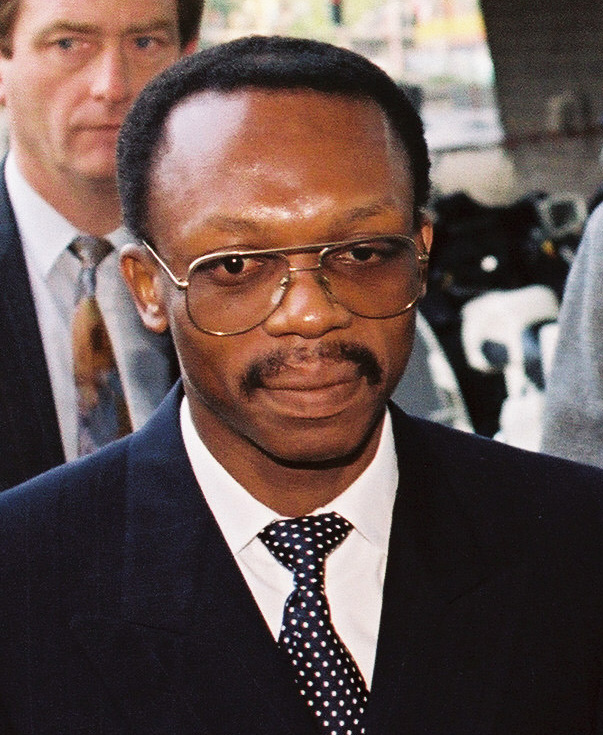
- Aristide in 1991

President of Haiti
- In office 4 February 2001 – 29 February 2004
- Prime Minister: Jacques-Édouard Alexis; Jean Marie Chérestal; Yvon Neptune
- Preceded by: René Préval
- Succeeded by: Boniface Alexandre (acting)
- In office 12 October 1994 – 7 February 1996
- Prime Minister: Smarck Michel; Claudette Werleigh
- Preceded by: Émile Jonassaint (acting)
- Succeeded by: René Préval
- In office 7 February 1991 – 29 September 1991
- Prime Minister: René Préval
- Preceded by: Ertha Pascal-Trouillot (acting)
- Succeeded by: Raoul Cédras (de facto)

Leader of Fanmi Lavalas
- Incumbent
- Assumed office 30 October 1996
- Preceded by: Office established

Personal details
- Born: 15 July 1953 (age 73) Port-Salut, Sud, Haiti
- Party: Lavalas Political Organization (1991–96); Fanmi Lavalas (1996–present)
- Spouse: Mildred Trouillot (m. 1996)
- Children: 2
- Education: Collège Notre-Dame; State University of Haiti; University of South Africa
- Occupation: Priest

Ecclesiastical career
- Church: Catholic Church (Salesians of Don Bosco)
- Ordained: 1982
- Laicized: 1994
- Congregations: St. Jean Bosco Church, Port-au-Prince

Jean-Bertrand Aristide (French pronunciation: [ʒɑ̃ bɛʁtʁɑ̃ aʁistid]; born 15 July 1953) is a Haitian former Salesian priest and politician who served as president of Haiti in 1991, from 1994 to 1996, and from 2001 to 2004. He lived in exile between the 1991 military coup and 1994, and again between the 2004 coup and 2011. Aristide was a member of the Lavalas Political Organization before he founded the party Fanmi Lavalas in 1996.

Aristide was appointed to a parish in Port-au-Prince in 1982 after completing his studies to become a priest of the Catholic Church. As a priest, he taught liberation theology and, as president, he attempted to normalize Afro-Creole culture, including Vodou religion, in Haiti. He became a focal point for the pro-democracy movement, first under Jean-Claude "Baby Doc" Duvalier and then under the military transition regime which followed. Aristide won the December 1990 presidential election, which was seen as the first free and fair election in Haitian history, with 67% of the vote, but was ousted just months later in the September 1991 military coup. His first presidency began political reforms and introduced a moderate economic program. Aristide went into exile because of the coup, and after negotiations with the military regime did not resolve the crisis, United States pressure and threat of force during Operation Uphold Democracy caused its removal.

During Aristide's return to power, he disbanded the Haitian military, which had a history of human rights abuses, and organized free elections during 1995. In 1996, he became the first elected Haitian leader to peacefully transfer power to an elected successor. He founded his own political party and returned to office after winning the November 2000 presidential election. In his economic policies, he tried to balance the interests of his populist supporters and foreign donors. He initially followed an austerity program that had been negotiated with the United States, the World Bank, and the IMF, but he later increased the minimum wage. His administration also built schools and hospitals, increased school enrollment, and established community stores to lower food costs. He faced increasing opposition during his second term, which coalesced as the Convergence Démocratique coalition, though he remained the most popular politician in Haiti. The United States paused foreign aid to Haiti due to a controversy related to the 2000 parliamentary election, which led to several years of negotiations by Aristide's government.

Economic conditions worsened in Haiti while foreign aid was cut off. Aristide was ousted again in a February 2004 coup d'état after right-wing ex-army paramilitary members invaded the country from across the Dominican border. Aristide and many others have alleged that the United States had a role in orchestrating the second coup against him. In 2022, numerous Haitian and French officials told The New York Times that France and the United States had effectively overthrown Aristide by pressuring him to step down, though this was denied by James Foley, U.S. Ambassador to Haiti at the time of the coup. After the second coup against him, Aristide went into exile in the Central African Republic and South Africa. He returned to Haiti in 2011 after seven years in exile. Since his return he has focused on the work of his foundation and university. Aristide remains popular among Haitians, though there is controversy over violence by his supporters and allegations of his involvement in corruption and drug trafficking.

== Background and church vocation ==
Jean-Bertrand Aristide was born into poverty in Port-Salut, Sud on 15 July 1953. His father died three months after Aristide was born, and he later moved to Port-au-Prince with his mother. At age five, Aristide started school with priests of the Salesian order. He was educated at the Collège Notre-Dame in Cap-Haïtien, graduating with honors in 1974. He then took a course of novitiate studies in La Vega, Dominican Republic, before returning to Haiti to study philosophy at the Grand Séminaire Notre Dame and psychology at the State University of Haiti.

After completing his post-graduate studies in 1979, Aristide travelled in Europe, studying in Italy, Greece, and at the Cremisan Monastery in the town of Beit Jala. He returned to Haiti in 1982 for his ordination as a Salesian priest, and was appointed curate of a small parish in Port-au-Prince.

Between 1957 and 1986, Haiti was ruled by the family dictatorships of François "Papa Doc" and Jean-Claude "Baby Doc" Duvalier. The misery endured by Haiti's poor made a deep impression on Aristide himself, and he became an outspoken critic of Duvalierism. Nor did he spare the hierarchy of the country's church, since a 1966 Vatican Concordat granted Duvalier one-time power to appoint Haiti's bishops. An exponent of liberation theology, Aristide denounced Duvalier's regime in one of his earliest sermons. This did not go unnoticed by the regime's top echelons. Under pressure, the provincial delegate of the Salesian Order sent Aristide into three years of exile in Montreal. By 1985, as popular opposition to Duvalier's regime grew, Aristide was back preaching in Haiti. His Easter Week sermon, "A call to holiness", delivered at the cathedral of Port-au-Prince and later broadcast throughout Haiti, proclaimed: "The path of those Haitians who reject the regime is the path of righteousness and love."

Aristide became a leading figure in the Ti Legliz movement, whose name means "little church" in Kreyòl. In September 1985, he was appointed to St. Jean Bosco church, in a poor neighborhood in Port-au-Prince. Struck by the absence of young people in the church, Aristide began to organize youth, sponsoring weekly youth Masses. He founded an orphanage for urban street children in 1986 called Lafanmi Selavi [Family is Life]. The program sought to be a model of participatory democracy for the children it served. As Aristide became a leading voice for the aspirations of Haiti's dispossessed, he inevitably became a target for attack. He survived at least four assassination attempts. The most widely publicized attempt, the St. Jean Bosco massacre, occurred on 11 September 1988, when over one hundred armed former Tontons Macoute wearing red armbands forced their way into St. Jean Bosco as Aristide began Sunday Mass. As army troops and police stood by, the men fired machine guns at the congregation and attacked fleeing parishioners with machetes. Aristide's church was burned to the ground. Thirteen people are reported to have been killed, and 77 wounded. Aristide survived and went into hiding.

Subsequently, Salesian officials ordered Aristide to leave Haiti, but tens of thousands of Haitians protested, blocking his access to the airport. In December 1988, Aristide was expelled from the Salesian order. A statement prepared by the Salesians called the priest's political activities an "incitement to hatred and violence", out of line with his role as a clergyman. Aristide appealed the decision, saying: "The crime of which I stand accused is the crime of preaching food for all men and women." In a January 1988 interview, he said "The solution is revolution, first in the spirit of the Gospel; Jesus could not accept people going hungry. It is a conflict between classes, rich and poor. My role is to preach and organize...." In 1994, Aristide left priesthood, ending years of tension with the church over his criticism of its hierarchy and his espousal of liberation theology. Aristide married Mildred Trouillot, on 20 January 1996, with whom he had two daughters.

== First presidency (1991–96) ==
Aristide emerged from his pastoral and social activities to run in the 1990 election, leading the Lavalas populist coalition of the impoverished majority and progressive parties opposed to the Duvalier dictatorship. Aristide announced his candidacy for the presidency on 18 October 1990, and became the candidate from the National Front for Democracy and Change (FNCD). Following a six-week campaign, during which he called for changes to the economy to help the poor and pledged to fight against corruption, Aristide was elected president on 16 December 1990. He won 67% of the vote in what is generally recognized as the first free and fair election in Haitian history. He notably defeated Marc Bazin, the U.S.-favored conservative candidate, and Roger Lafontant, a Tonton Macoute leader under Duvalier.

A coup attempt against Aristide had taken place on 6 January, even before his inauguration, when Roger Lafontant seized the provisional president Ertha Pascal-Trouillot, the first and only woman president. After large numbers of Aristide supporters filled the streets in protest and Lafontant attempted to declare martial law, the army crushed the incipient coup. Aristide was inaugurated as president on 7 February 1991, becoming the first freely elected Haitian leader in over thirty years. He inherited a country facing bankruptcy, crumbling infrastructure, a failing power grid, and high levels of unemployment and illiteracy. Although he was a social democrat, his government began an austerity program to bring the country's budget deficit under control. This included cutting expenses, including by firing about 5,000 state employees, and improving tax collection. He moved towards free market reforms to make Haiti a better climate for foreign investors, and so that it could become eligible for IMF grants and loans. He also tried to balance the interests of his populist supporters. His administration attempted to keep some "basic needs" policies while not alienating international financial institutions, such as by directing resources to the part of the population in need of them.

During Aristide's short-lived first period in office, he attempted to carry out substantial reforms, which brought passionate opposition from Haiti's business and military elite. He sought to bring the military under civilian control, retiring the commander in chief of the army Hérard Abraham, initiated investigations of human rights violations, and brought to trial several Tontons Macoute who had not fled the country. He also banned the emigration of many well known Haitians until their bank accounts had been examined. His relationship with the National Assembly soon deteriorated, and he attempted repeatedly to bypass it on judicial, Cabinet and ambassadorial appointments. His nomination of his close friend and political ally, René Préval, as prime minister, provoked severe criticism from political opponents overlooked, and the National Assembly threatened a no-confidence vote against Préval in August 1991. This led to a crowd of at least 2,000 at the National Palace, which threatened violence; together with Aristide's failure to explicitly reject mob violence, this permitted the junta, which would topple him, to accuse him of human rights violations. The nomination of Marie-Denise Fabien Jean-Louis, a Duvalier-linked physician with no diplomatic experience, as minister of foreign affairs, also received significant opposition from many within the Lavalas movement.

=== 1991 coup and exile ===
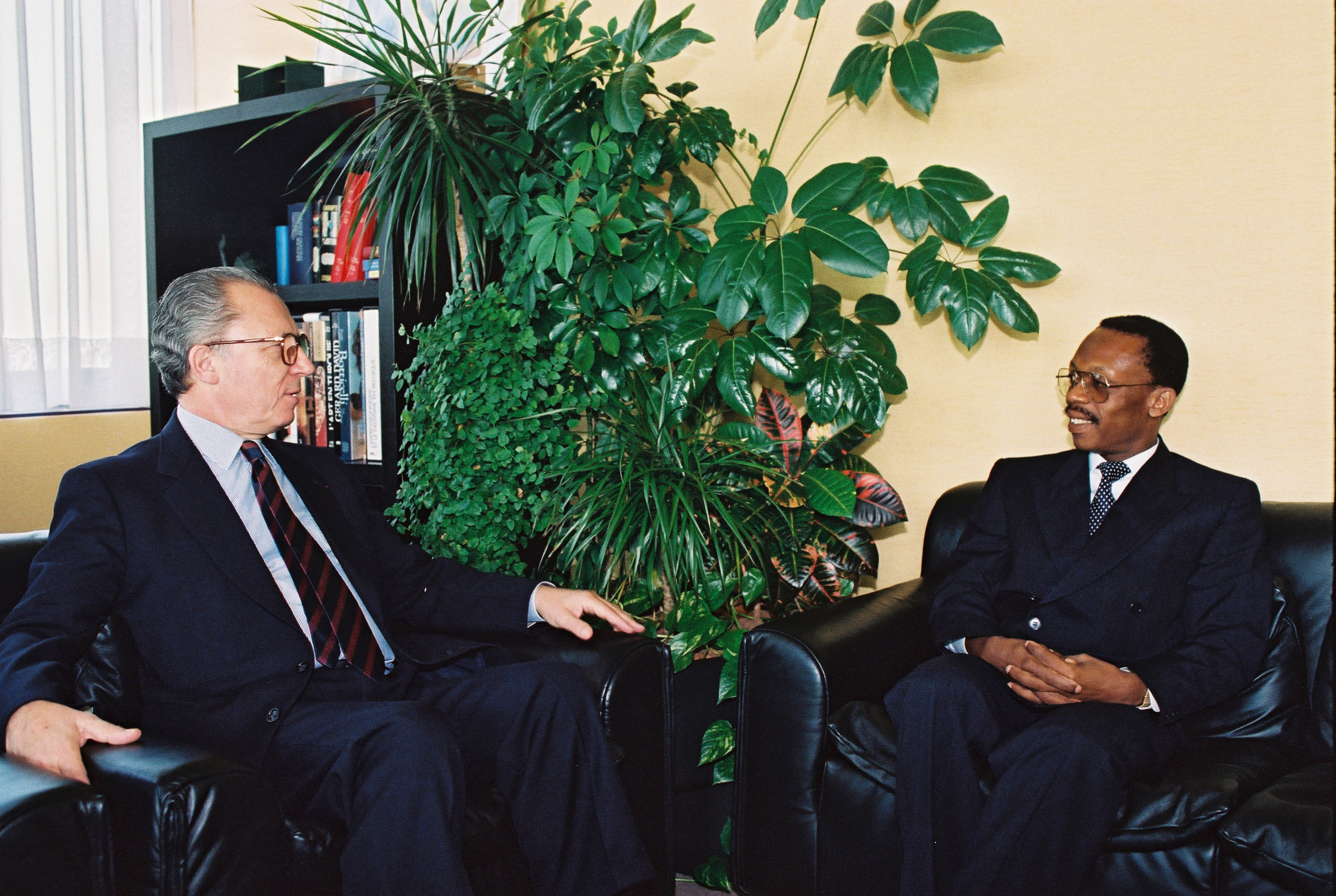
Aristide with European Commission President Jacques Delors during a visit to Europe in October 1991

In September 1991 the army performed a coup against him, led by army general Raoul Cédras, who had been promoted by Aristide in June to commander-in-chief of the army. Aristide was deposed on 29 September 1991, and after several days sent into exile, his life only saved by the intervention of U.S., French and Venezuelan diplomats. In accordance with the requirements of article 149 of the Haitian Constitution, Supreme Court justice Joseph Nérette was installed as provisional president to serve until elections were held within 90 days of Aristide's resignation. However, real power was held by army commander Raoul Cédras. High-ranking members of the Haitian National Intelligence Service (SIN), which had been set up and financed in the 1980s by the U.S. Central Intelligence Agency (CIA) as part of the war on drugs, were involved in the coup, and were reportedly still receiving funding and training from the CIA at the time of the coup, but this funding reportedly ended afterwards. The New York Times stated, "No evidence suggests that the C.I.A. backed the coup or intentionally undermined President Aristide." However, press reports about possible CIA involvement in Haitian politics before the coup sparked congressional hearings in the United States.

A campaign of terror against Aristide supporters was started by Emmanuel Constant after Aristide was forced out of power. In 1993, Constant, who had been on the CIA's payroll as an informant since 1992, organized the Front for the Advancement and Progress of Haïti (FRAPH), which targeted and killed Aristide supporters. Aristide spent his exile first in Venezuela and then in the United States, working to develop international support. A United Nations trade embargo during Aristide's exile, intended to force the coup leaders to step down, was a strong blow to Haiti's already weak economy. President George H. W. Bush granted an exemption from the embargo to many U.S. companies doing business in Haiti, and president Bill Clinton extended this exemption. The Bush administration had immediately condemned the coup, but later shifted its position from demanding his restoration to calling for a return to constitutional order, while criticizing alleged human rights abuses and violence against political opponents during Aristide's presidency. Aristide's representatives took part in OAS-brokered negotiations with the military junta for him to return, but these were unsuccessful. In January 1993, Aristide had a conversation with Clinton in which he indicated his willingness to give amnesty to the rebels, and they issued a joint statement calling on Haitians to remain in their country instead of seeking asylum in the United States.

In addition to this trade with the United States, the coup regime was supported by massive profits from the drug trade thanks to the Haitian military's affiliation with the Cali Cartel; Aristide publicly stated that his own pursuit of arresting drug dealers was one event that prompted the coup by drug-affiliated military officials Raul Cedras and Michel Francois (a claim echoed by his former secretary of State Patrick Elie). Representative John Conyers (D-Michigan) expressed concern that the only U.S. government agency to publicly recognize the Haitian junta's role in drug trafficking was the Drug Enforcement Administration, and that, despite a wealth of evidence provided by the DEA proving the junta's drug connections, the Clinton administration downplayed this factor rather than use it as a hedge against the junta (as the U.S. government had done against Manuel Noriega). Nairn in particular alleged that the CIA's connections to these drug traffickers in the junta not only dated to the creation of SIN, but were ongoing during and after the coup. Nairn's claims are confirmed in part by revelations of Emmanuel Constant regarding the ties of his FRAPH organization to the CIA before and during the coup government.

=== 1994 return ===
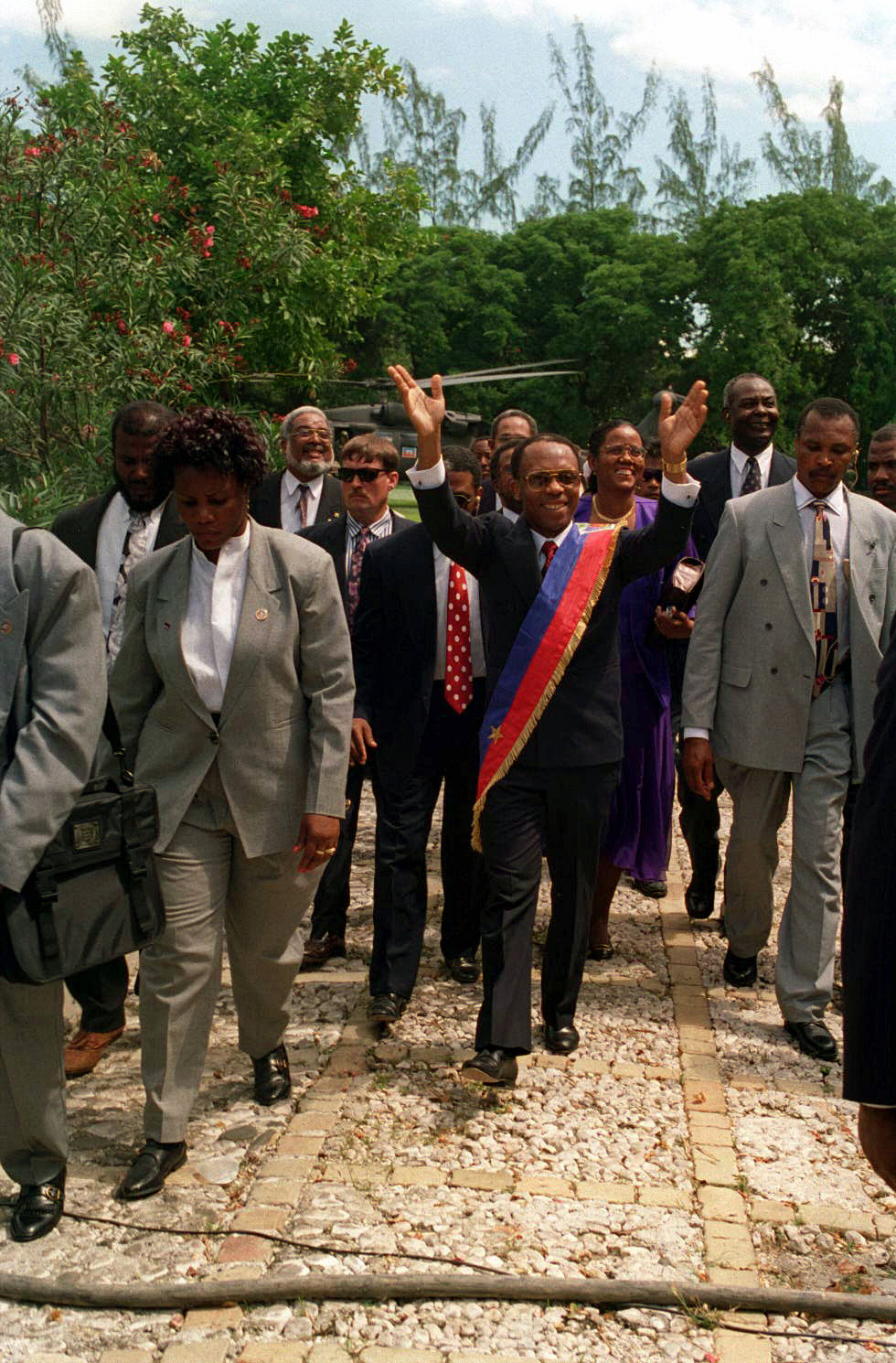
President Jean-Bertrand Aristide returns triumphantly to the National Palace in Port-au-Prince

The Clinton administration described the de facto military regime in Haiti as illegal and supported the restoration of Aristide as president. On 14 June 1993, after de facto prime minister Marc Bazin resigned, the parliament considered asking Aristide to appoint a new prime minister. On 3 July, following talks mediated by UN envoy Dante Caputo at Governors Island in New York, Raoul Cédras agreed that he would resign as army chief and restore Aristide as president by 30 October 1993. The Haitian parliament agreed on the plan to restore Aristide to power on 17 July. Aristide appointed Robert Malval, who was confirmed as prime minister in August.

However, the Governors Island Agreement broke down as the military refused to implement it, and a member of the new cabinet, Guy Malary, was killed in October. Despite the U.S., France, Canada, and Venezuela pressuring the military regime to restore Aristide by 15 January 1994, this did not occur. On 12 May 1994, the military regime appointed Supreme Court justice Émile Jonassaint as provisional president. The passing of United Nations Security Council Resolution 940 in July allowed a multinational force to remove the military regime and restore Aristide. Aristide did not call for a U.S. intervention, and said that the constitution did not allow him to do so, but urged "swift and definitive action" against the military regime. In late September 1994, a last-minute negotiation led by Jimmy Carter convinced Cédras to step down as U.S. troops began arriving in Haiti under Operation Uphold Democracy. On 12 October, Aristide returned as the capital was secured by his government and U.S. troops. Jonassaint announced his resignation.

After his return to the presidency, Aristide appointed Smarck Michel as his prime minister on 24 October 1994. He established the Provisional Electoral Council to hold elections in the following year. The government made an effort to disarm paramilitary groups from the previous dictatorship. Another immediate challenge was creating an independent and professional judiciary and police force. An Interim Security Force was established with assistance from the U.S., and on 23 December 1994 the civilian Haitian National Police was founded. Aristide and the U.S. government negotiated the requirements for the new police force. He disbanded the last elements of the Armed Forces of Haiti on 28 April 1995, which had committed many murders and human rights abuses. The decision was opposed by the U.S., which believed a military was still needed for stability.

Michel resigned in October 1995 after Aristide undermined his attempt to pass an economic reform package, including for the privatization of state enterprises. Aristide was unable to reach an agreement with the IMF over highly unpopular reforms to the public sector. However, during 1995 the Haitian economy experienced growth for the first time since 1989, and the rate of inflation decreased. He did pursue an economic agenda that had been agreed with the U.S., the IMF, and the World Bank while he was in exile, which postponed minimum wage regulations, laid off state employees, and created a climate favorable to foreign investment. The Lavalas Political Organization (OPL), led by Gérard Pierre-Charles and allied with Aristide, won the majority of seats in the parliamentary elections during 1995. Aristide's first presidency was noted for the disbanding of the oppressive military, the virtual ending of human rights violations, and organizing free elections. René Préval became the presidential candidate from Lavalas, and he received Aristide's endorsement just before the December election. Preval won the election and was inaugurated as the president of the Republic on 7 February 1996. Aristide became Haiti's first elected leader to peacefully transfer power to an elected successor.

== Opposition (1996–2001) ==
Aristide remained popular after leaving office, despite trying to keep a low profile. He frequently spoke with his successor, René Préval. In late 1996, Aristide broke from the OPL over what he called its "distance from the people" and created a new political party, the Fanmi Lavalas (FL). The OPL, holding the majority in the Senate and the Chamber of Deputies, renamed itself the Struggling People's Organization, maintaining the OPL acronym. Aristide began preparing the FL to run against the OPL in the next elections, which were meant to be held in 1998 but were delayed until May 2000.

Fanmi Lavalas won the 2000 legislative election in May, but ten Senate seats were allocated to Lavalas candidates that critics claimed should have had second-round runoffs (as the votes of some smaller parties were eliminated in final vote counts, which had also been done in earlier elections). Critics argue that FL had not achieved a first-round majority for this handful of Senate seats, and that Fanmi Lavalas controlled the Provisional Election Council which made the decision. FL won the majority of seats in the Senate and the Chamber of Deputies, municipal governments, and commune executive and legislative councils. The controversy over the Senate election received attention from CARICOM and the OAS over the next several months following May, and caused the suspension of $500 million in foreign aid. The blocking occurred over what has been described as an election technicality that would have likely not changed the outcome.

Aristide then was elected later that year in the 2000 presidential election, on 26 November, an election boycotted by most opposition political parties, now organised into the Convergence Démocratique (CD). CD consisted of social democratic, right-wing, and business-linked parties. Although the U.S. government claimed that the election turnout was hardly over 10%, the Haitian government claimed turnout of around 60% and at the time, CNN reported a turnout of 60% with over 92% voting for Aristide. The Bush administration in the U.S. and Haitian expatriate opposition leaders in Florida would use the criticism over the election to argue for an embargo on international aid to the Haitian government.

== Second presidency (2001–2004) ==
Aristide was inaugurated for his second five-year term as president on 7 February 2001. For the first time during his years as president, he faced virtually no significant political opposition, as his party Fanmi Lavalas had control over most offices in the country. One of Aristide's first actions, before he started his term, was to negotiate with the U.S. on a series of steps to restore Haiti's relations with its international partners, which included addressing the election controversy, installing a diverse and technocratic cabinet, creating a new electoral council, and cooperating with the U.S. on specific law enforcement issues. The agreement was negotiated by Clinton's national security advisor, Anthony Lake, and was also endorsed by the incoming George W. Bush administration. Aristide's goal was to get foreign aid to Haiti unblocked. In mid-July 2001, negotiations mediated by the OAS between CD, the opposition, and FL led to agreement to form a new electoral council and have new elections, but attacks on police stations later that month and a coup attempt in December derailed the process.

In 2002, Human Rights Watch wrote that Aristide showed "little inclination" to follow through on the agreement. Haiti continued to face a political crisis and a declining economy. Aristide encouraged Haitians to invest in cooperative saving institutions paying 10 percent interest a month, called "10 percenters." The 10 percenters were regarded by economists and bankers as pyramid schemes even before they collapsed, which they did in 2002, leaving many Haitian investors impoverished. He did get several FL senators to resign, and attempted to form a new election council. However, the opposition refused to participate in government institutions as the agreement called for, and demanded that Aristide resign instead. Aristide said he would complete his term, which ended in February 2006. The delay in the agreement's implementation was used to continue blocking foreign aid to Haiti by some donors, such as the EU. In November 2002 the opposition held demonstrations in the country's major cities calling on Aristide to resign. Aristide condemned violence and called on the opposition to negotiate with the government. He characterized the dispute as being part of Haiti's long history of coups. Starting in September 2003, protests took place in the city of Gonaïves and became increasingly violent.

In February 2003 he announced an increase to Haiti's minimum wage (though the majority of Haitians work in informal jobs). In April 2003, Aristide called for France, the former colonizer of the country, to pay $21 billion in restitution to Haiti for the 90 million gold francs supplied to France by Haiti in restitution for French property, including enslaved people, that was appropriated in the Haitian rebellion, over the period from 1825 to 1947.

=== 2004 overthrow ===
It has been alleged that after his return to power in 2001, Aristide increasingly relied on street gangs to enforce his will and to terrorize his political opponents. After the murder of Amiot Métayer, the leader of the pro-Aristide Lame Kanibal (Cannibal Army) gang in the Raboteau slum in the northern city of Gonaïves in September 2003, Métayer's partisans, believing that Aristide had ordered his killing, rose up against the president. On 5 December 2003, organized pro-Aristide forces committed and encouraged violent attacks and threats against University of Port-au-Prince students protesting against Aristide.

In early 2004, the Cannibal Army was joined in its fight against the government by former military and police, many of whom had been in exile in the Dominican Republic and who had been launching cross-border raids since 2001. The paramilitary campaign was headed by ex-police chief Guy Philippe and former FRAPH death squad founder Louis Jodel Chamblain. In February 2004, pro-Aristide forces were accused of committing a massacre in the city of Saint-Marc. The pro-government Haitian National Police was overrun, though supporters of Aristide set up barricades in Port-au-Prince.

The rebels soon took control of the North, and eventually laid siege to, and then invaded, the capital. Under disputed circumstances, Aristide was flown out of the country by the U.S. with assistance from Canada and France on 28 February 2004. Aristide and his bodyguard, Franz Gabriel, stated that he was the victim of a "new coup d'état or modern kidnapping" by U.S. forces. Mrs. Aristide stated that the personnel who escorted him wore U.S. Special Forces uniforms, but changed into civilian clothes upon boarding the aircraft that was used to remove them from Haiti. Jamaican prime minister P. J. Patterson released a statement saying "we are bound to question whether his resignation was truly voluntary, as it comes after the capture of regions of Haiti by armed insurgents and the failure of the international community to provide the requisite support. The removal of President Aristide in these circumstances sets a dangerous precedent for democratically elected governments anywhere and everywhere, as it promotes the removal of duly elected persons from office by the power of rebel forces." Meanwhile, National Palace security agent Casimir Chariot said that Aristide left of his own free will. Aristide's prime minister, Yvon Neptune, also said that Aristide's resignation was genuine.

After Aristide was flown out of Haiti, looters raided his villa. Most barricades were lifted the day after Aristide left as the shooting had stopped; order was maintained by Haitian police, along with armed rebels and local vigilantes. Almost immediately after the Aristide family was transported from Haiti, the Prime Minister of Jamaica, P.J. Patterson, dispatched a member of parliament, Sharon Hay-Webster, to the Central African Republic. The leadership of that country agreed that Aristide and his family could go to Jamaica. The Aristide family remained on the island for several months until the Jamaican government gained acceptance by South Africa for the family to relocate there.

Aristide later claimed that France and the U.S. had a role in what he termed "a kidnapping" that took him from Haiti to South Africa via the Central African Republic. However, authorities said his temporary asylum there had been negotiated by the United States, France and Gabon. On 1 March 2004, U.S. congresswoman Maxine Waters, along with Aristide family friend Randall Robinson, reported Aristide had told them that he had been forced to resign and had been abducted from the country by the United States and that he had been held hostage by an armed military guard. According to Waters, Mildred Aristide called her at her home at 6:30 am, informing her that "the coup d'état has been completed". She also stated how Jean-Bertrand Aristide claimed the U.S. embassy in Haiti's chief of staff came to his house and threatened that he, alongside many other Haitians would be killed if he did not resign. Aristide's letter, which is described as his resignation, does not actually contain Aristide clearly and officially resigning. Representative Charles Rangel, D-New York, expressed similar words, saying Aristide had told him he was "disappointed that the international community had let him down" and "that he resigned under pressure" – "As a matter of fact, he was very apprehensive for his life. They made it clear that he had to go now or he would be killed." When asked for his response to these statements Colin Powell said that "it might have been better for members of Congress who have heard these stories to ask us about the stories before going public with them so we don't make a difficult situation that much more difficult" and he alleged that Aristide "did not democratically govern or govern well". CARICOM, an organization of Caribbean countries that included Haiti, called for a United Nations investigation into Aristide's removal, but were reportedly pressured by the U.S. and France to drop their request. Some observers suggest the rebellion and removal of Aristide were covertly orchestrated by these two countries and Canada.

In 2022, Thierry Burkard, the French ambassador to Haiti at the time, told the New York Times that France and the United States had effectively orchestrated a coup against Aristide by forcing him into exile. In response to this, James Brendan Foley, U.S. Ambassador to Haiti at the time of the coup, called these claims untrue, stating that it was never U.S. policy to remove Aristide. He said that Aristide had requested a U.S. rescue and that the decision to dispatch a plane to carry him to safety had been agreed upon following night-time discussions at the behest of Aristide.

In a 2006 interview, Aristide claimed the United States reneged on compromises he made with it over the privatization of enterprises to ensure that part of the profits from those enterprises would be distributed to the Haitian population and then relied on a disinformation campaign to discredit him.

== Exile (2004–2011) ==
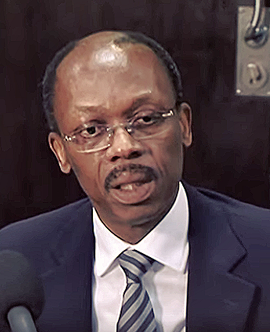
Aristide in 2010

After being cast into exile, in mid-2004 Aristide, his family, and bodyguards were welcomed to South Africa by several cabinet ministers, 20 senior diplomats, and a guard of honor. Receiving a salary from and provided staff by the South African government, Aristide lived with his family in a government villa in Pretoria. In South Africa, Aristide became an honorary research fellow at the University of South Africa, learned Zulu, and, on 25 April 2007, received a doctorate in African languages.

On 21 December 2007, a speech by Aristide marking the new year and Haiti's Independence Day was broadcast, the fourth such speech since his exile; in the speech he criticized the 2006 presidential election in which Préval was elected, describing it as a "selection", in which "the knife of treason was planted" in the back of the Haitian people.

Since the election, some high-ranking members of Lavalas have been targets for violence. Lovinsky Pierre-Antoine, a leading human rights organizer in Haiti and a member of Lavalas, disappeared in August 2007. His whereabouts remain unknown and a news article states: "Like many protesters, he [Wilson Mesilien, coordinator of the pro-Aristide 30 September Foundation] wore a T-shirt demanding the return of foundation leader Lovinsky Pierre-Antoine, a human rights activist and critic of both U.N. and U.S. involvement in Haiti who disappeared in August."

=== Return to Haiti ===
In a confidential 2008 United States embassy cable, former U.S. ambassador to Haiti Janet Sanderson emphasized that: "A premature departure of MINUSTAH would leave the [Haitian] government...vulnerable to...resurgent populist and anti-market economy political forces – reversing gains of the last two years. MINUSTAH is an indispensable tool in realizing core USG [U.S. government] policy interests in Haiti."

At a meeting with U.S. State Department officials on 2 August 2006, former Guatemalan diplomat Edmond Mulet, then chief of MINUSTAH, urged U.S. legal action against Aristide to prevent the former president from gaining more traction with the Haitian population and returning to Haiti.

At Mulet's request, UN Secretary General Kofi Annan urged South Africa's president Thabo Mbeki to ensure that Aristide remained in the country.

U.S. ambassador James Foley wrote in a confidential 22 March 2005 cable that an August 2004 poll "showed that Aristide was still the only figure in Haiti with a favorability rating above 50%".

After René Préval, a former ally of Aristide, was elected president of Haiti in 2006, he said it would be possible for Aristide to return to Haiti.

On 16 December 2009, several thousand protesters marched through Port-au-Prince calling for Aristide's return to Haiti, and protesting the exclusion of Aristide's Fanmi Lavalas party from upcoming elections.

On 12 January 2010, Aristide sent his condolences to victims of the earthquake in Haiti just a few hours after it occurred, and stated that he wished to return to help rebuild the country.

On 7 November 2010, in an exclusive interview (the last given before his return to Haiti) with independent reporter Nicolas Rossier in Eurasia Review and the Huffington Post, Aristide declared that the 2010 elections were not inclusive of his party, Fanmi Lavalas, and therefore not fair and free. He also confirmed his wishes to go back to Haiti but stated that he was not allowed to travel out of South Africa.

In February 2011, Aristide announced that he would return to Haiti within days of the ruling Haitian government removing impediments to him receiving his Haitian passport. On 17 March 2011, Aristide departed for Haiti from his exile in South Africa. U.S. president Barack Obama had asked South African president Jacob Zuma to delay Aristide's departure to prevent him from returning to Haiti before a presidential run-off election scheduled for 20 March. Aristide's party was barred from participating in the election, and the U.S. feared his return could be destabilizing. On Friday, 18 March 2011, he and his spouse arrived at Toussaint Louverture International Airport, and were greeted by thousands of supporters. He told the crowd waiting at the airport: "The exclusion of Fanmi Lavalas is the exclusion of the Haitian people. In 1804, the Haitian revolution marked the end of slavery. Today, may the Haitian people end exiles and coups d'état, while peacefully moving from social exclusion to inclusion."

== Post-exile (2011–present) ==
After Aristide returned to Haiti in 2011, he abstained from political involvement. On 12 September 2014, Aristide was ordered under house arrest by Judge Lamarre Belzaire while under a corruption investigation. Aristide's lawyers and supporters of Fanmi Lavalas questioned the legality of the judge's order under Haitian law as well as the judge's impartiality.

He has primarily focused on activities related to his foundation and university since his return from exile. In late 2016, Aristide, for the first time in many years, returned to electioneering, touring the country to promote Fanmi Lavalas candidates; the election results (decried by his party as illegitimate) returned to power right-wing forces in the country, with only a 20% voter turnout. In June 2021, Aristide tested positive for COVID-19 and sought permission from government to travel to Cuba for treatment. He fully recovered and returned to Haiti in July 2021.

Aristide and Fanmi Lavalas have been deeply involved in the Haitian political crisis. In the fall of 2024, Aristide met with acting prime minister Garry Conille, shortly before he was replaced by Alix Didier Fils-Aimé, and spoke in favor of the prime minister's office coexisting with the Transitional Presidential Council. Leslie Voltaire, Aristide's former chief of staff, became the chairman of the council in 2024. On 21–22 February 2026, after the mandate of the Transitional Presidential Council expired earlier than month, Fanmi Lavalas signed the "National Pact for Stability and the Organization of Elections" to support the government of acting prime minister Fils-Aimé.

== Accomplishments ==
Under president Aristide's leadership, the Haitian government implemented many major reforms. These included greatly increasing access to health care and education for the general population, increasing adult literacy and protections for those accused of crimes, improving training for judges, prohibiting human trafficking, disbanding the Haitian military, establishing an improved climate for human rights and civil liberties, doubling the minimum wage, instituting land reform and assistance to small farmers, providing boat construction training to fishermen, establishing a food distribution network to provide low cost food to the poor at below market prices, building low-cost housing, and reducing government corruption.

As of 2024, according to the Quincy Institute for Responsible Statecraft, "Haiti has never recovered the level of democracy it had before Aristide's departure." Since the end of his presidency, there has only been one transition of power from an elected president to another, in 2011.

=== Achievements in education ===
During successive Lavalas administrations, Jean-Bertrand Aristide and René Préval built 195 new primary schools and 104 secondary schools. Prior to Aristide's election in 1990, there were just 34 secondary schools nationwide. Lavalas also provided thousands of scholarships so that children could afford to attend church/private schools. Between 2001 and 2004, the percentage of children enrolled in primary school education rose to 72%, and an estimated 300,000 adults took part in Lavalas sponsored adult literacy campaigns. This helped the adult literacy rate rise from 35% to 55%.

=== Achievements in health care ===
In addition to numerous educational advances, Aristide and Lavalas embarked on an ambitious plan to develop the public primary health care system with Cuban assistance. Since the devastation unleashed by Hurricane Georges in 1998, Cuba entered a humanitarian agreement with Haiti whereby Haitian doctors would be trained in Cuba, and Cuban doctors would work in rural areas. At the time of 2010 Haiti earthquake, 573 doctors had been trained in Cuba.

Despite operating under an aid embargo, the Lavalas administration succeeded in reducing the infant mortality rate as well as reducing the percentage of underweight newborns. A successful AIDS prevention and treatment program was also established, leading the Catholic Institute for International Relations to state: the "incredible feat of slowing the rate of new infections in Haiti has been achieved despite the lack of international aid to the Haitian government, and despite the notable lack of resources faced by those working in the health field".

=== Disbanding the army and paramilitary units ===
The Lavalas political project has long been dedicated to promoting a civilian police force and disbanding the long-time tools of elite repression in Haiti which have been the country's brutal military and paramilitary forces. The government under Aristide launched the first trial of paramilitary death squads and successfully jailed many after aired on Haitian public television trials of FAdH and FRAPH members involved in massacres of civilians.

Trials were held bringing to justice a handful of wealthy individuals from among Haiti's upper class that had financed paramilitary death squads, including individuals such as Judy C. Roy (who has acknowledged her financing of the FLRN death squads) of whom held close ties with the former dictators Raoul Cedras and Jean-Claude Duvalier. Reforming the country's security services though posed a constant problem for Lavalas, as the U.S. sought to undermine these reform efforts by seeking to re-insert its right-wing allies into the police force. The Lavalas government also faced a lack of resources, due to cuts in aid to Haiti with US policies under the first presidency of George W. Bush. Meanwhile, there was continued prevalence of corruption in connection with the drug trade.

== Criticism ==
Several of his former associates were convicted of drug trafficking. However, despite allegations of his own involvement, Aristide himself has never been charged or convicted.

=== Accusations of human rights abuses ===
Human Rights Watch accused the Haitian police force under Aristide and his political supporters of attacks on opposition rallies. They also said that the emergence of armed rebels seeking to overthrow Aristide reflected "the failure of the country's democratic institutions and procedures". According to a study by researcher Jeb Sprague, the armed rebel paramilitary units received vital support from a handful of Haitian elites, Dominican governmental sectors, and foreign intelligence. The undermanned Haitian police faced difficulties in repelling cross-border attacks led by the ex-army paramilitary rebels.

Videos surfaced showing a portion of a speech by Aristide on 27 August 1991, occurring just after military personnel and death squad members attempted to assassinate him, in which he says "Don't hesitate to give him what he deserves. What a beautiful tool! What a beautiful instrument! What a beautiful piece of equipment! It's beautiful, yes it's beautiful, it's cute, it's pretty, it has a good smell, wherever you go you want to inhale it." Critics allege that he was endorsing the practice of "necklacing" opposition activists, placing a gasoline-soaked tire around a person's neck and setting the tire ablaze; others argue he was actually speaking about people using the constitution to empower themselves and to defend their country against right-wing death squads. Earlier in the speech he is quoted as saying "Your tool in hand, your instrument in hand, your constitution in hand! Don't hesitate to give him what he deserves. Your equipment in hand, your trowel in hand, your pencil in hand, your Constitution in hand, don't hesitate to give him what he deserves."

Although there were accusations of human rights abuses, the OAS/UN International Civilian Mission in Haiti, known by the French acronym MICIVIH, found that the human rights situation in Haiti improved dramatically following Aristide's return to power in 1994. Amnesty International reported that, after Aristide's departure in 2004, Haiti was "descending into a severe humanitarian and human rights crisis". BBC correspondents say that Aristide is seen as a champion of the poor, and remains popular with many in Haiti. Aristide continues to be among the most important political figures in the country, and is considered by many to be the only really popular, democratically elected leader Haiti has ever had. Yet his second administration was targeted for destabilization and is remembered as a time of great difficulty of many.

=== Accusations of corruption ===
Some officials have been indicted by a U.S. court. Companies that allegedly made deals with Aristide's government included IDT, Fusion Telecommunications, and Skytel; critics claim the first two companies had political links to Aristide. AT&T reportedly declined to wire money to "Mont Salem". Aristide's supporters say corruption charges against the former president are a deliberate attempt to keep a popular leader from running in elections.

== Views ==
In 2000, Aristide published The Eyes of the Heart: Seeking a Path for the Poor in the Age of Globalization, which accused the World Bank and the International Monetary Fund of working on behalf of the world's wealthiest nations rather than in the interest of genuine international development. Aristide called for "a culture of global solidarity" to eliminate poverty as an alternative to the globalization represented by neocolonialism and neoliberalism.

Aristide is known for organizing popular resistance to the Duvalier dynasty as a priest, and saw it a Christian duty to oppose the privilege of the rich oligarchy and social injustice of capitalism. He commented on his actions: "I acted as a theologian in order to guide a political struggle: the irruption of the poor on the social scene." While sometimes described as communist, Aristide himself argues that his view are of Catholic rather than Marxist inspiration, but also clarified that Marxist writings are valuable and were used by him among other political philosophies. Aristide followed the principle of class struggle, which he saw as undeniable reality: "I did not invent class struggle. Neither did Karl Marx. I would have preferred never to meet it. This may be possible if one never leaves the Vatican or the heights of Petionville [a chic Haitian suburb]. In the streets of Port-au-Prince, who has not met class struggle? It is not a topic for controversy, but a fact, based on empirical evidence."

== Awards and honors ==
- First Chancellor's Distinguished Honor (awarded by the University of California, Berkeley);
- 1996 UNESCO Prize for Human Rights Education;

== Publications ==
- (With Laura Flynn) The Eyes of the Heart: Seeking a Path for the Poor in the Age of Globalization, Common Courage Press, 2000.
- Dignity, University of Virginia Press, 1996; translated from Dignité, Éditions du Seuil, 1994.
- Névrose vétéro-testamentaire, Editions du CIDIHCA, 1994.
- Aristide: An Autobiography, Orbis Books, 1993.
- Tout homme est un homme, Éditions du Seuil, 1992.
- Théologie et politique, Editions du CIDIHCA, 1992.
- (With Amy Wilentz) In the Parish of the Poor: Writings from Haiti, Orbis Books, 1990.

== Sources ==
=== Books ===
- Metz, Helen Chapin (2001). Dominican Republic and Haiti: Country Studies. Area Handbook Series. Washington, D.C.: Federal Research Division, Library of Congress. ISBN 978-0-8444-1044-9.
- Fatton, Robert Jr. (2002). Haiti's Predatory Republic: The Unending Transition to Democracy. Lynne Reinner Publishers, Inc. ISBN 1-58826-060-7.

Political offices
| Preceded by Ertha Pascal-Trouillot; Acting | President of Haiti; 1991 | Succeeded by Raoul Cédras; De facto |
| Preceded by Émile Jonassaint; Acting | President of Haiti; 1994–1996 | Succeeded by René Préval |
| Preceded by René Préval | President of Haiti; 2001–2004 | Succeeded by Boniface Alexandre; Acting |
Party political offices
| New political party | Leader of Fanmi Lavalas; 1996−present | Incumbent |
